= 2000 Cleveland Browns season =

52nd season in franchise history

- Owner: Al Lerner
- General manager: Dwight Clark
- Head coach: Chris Palmer
- Offensive coordinator: Pete Carmichael
- Defensive coordinator: Romeo Crennel
- Home stadium: Cleveland Browns Stadium

Results
- Record: 3–13
- Division place: 6th AFC Central
- Playoffs: Did not qualify
- Pro Bowlers: None

The 2000 Cleveland Browns season was the team's 48th season with the National Football League and 52nd overall. It was the second season of the "New Browns", which returned to the NFL in 1999.

Kicker Phil Dawson was the Browns’ leading scorer with 59 points. The Browns total offense ranked 31st (last) in the league, while their total defense ranked 26th in the league. The 2000 Browns’ 161 points scored (10.06 per game) is the third-fewest ever by a team in a 16-game schedule, tied with the 1998 Eagles and behind the 1992 Seahawks and 1991 Colts. Additionally, their four games without scoring is the most in the NFL since the 1977 Buccaneers failed to score six times; by contrast the 2016 and 2017 Browns went a combined 1–31 but never failed to score a point in any game. The 1999 Browns scored 217 points, or 3.50 more per game than in 2000.

== Offseason ==
| Additions | Subtractions |
|---|---|
| QB Doug Pederson (Eagles) | RB Terry Kirby (Raiders) |
| DT Orpheus Roye (Steelers) | DE John Thierry (Packers) |
| RB Errict Rhett (Ravens) | T Scott Rehberg (Bengals) |
| DE Keith McKenzie (Packers) | G Orlando Bobo (Ravens) |
| G Everett Lindsay (Ravens) | CB Ryan McNeil (Cowboys) |
| T Roman Oben (Giants) | S Marquez Pope (Raiders) |
| S Percy Ellsworth (Giants) | T Lomas Brown (Giants) |
| LB Marty Moore (Patriots) | |

=== 2000 NFL draft ===
2000 Cleveland Browns draft
| Round | Pick | Player | Position | College | Notes |
| 1 | 1 | Courtney Brown | Defensive end | Penn State | |
| 2 | 32 | Dennis Northcutt | Wide receiver | Arizona | |
| 3 | 63 | Travis Prentice | Running back | Miami (OH) | |
| 3 | 79 | JaJuan Dawson | Wide receiver | Tulane | |
| 4 | 95 | Lewis Sanders | Cornerback | Maryland | |
| 4 | 110 | Aaron Shea | Tight end/Fullback | Michigan | |
| 5 | 130 | Anthony Malbrough | Cornerback | Texas Tech | |
| 5 | 146 | Lamar Chapman | Cornerback | Kansas State | |
| 6 | 183 | Spergon Wynn | Quarterback | Southwest Texas State | |
| 6 | 206 | Brad Bedell | Guard | Colorado | |
| 7 | 207 | Manuia Savea | Tackle | Arizona | |
| 7 | 209 | Eric Chandler | Defensive end | Jackson State | |
| 7 | 225 | Rashidi Barnes | Safety | Colorado | |
Made roster

=== Undrafted free agents ===
2000 undrafted free agents of note
| Player | Position | College |
|---|---|---|
| Kyle Allamon | Tight end | Texas Tech |
| Jeff Dyra | Tackle | Northwestern |
| Dwaune Jones | Wide receiver | Richmond |
| Jeff Kerr | Linebacker | East Carolina |
| Noel LaMontagne | Guard | Virginia |
| Shaun O'Hara | Center | Rutgers |
| Nate Terry | Defensive back | West Virginia |
| Kevin Thompson | Quarterback | Penn State |

== Personnel ==
=== Staff / Coaches ===
2000 Cleveland Browns staff
| Front office: Owner and chairman – Alfred Lerner; President and chief executive officer – Carmen Policy; Executive vice president/director of football operations – Dwight Clark; Executive director of player personnel – Joe Collins; Director of college personnel – Phil Neri; Director of pro personnel – Keith Kidd; Head coaches: Head coach – Chris Palmer; Offensive coaches: Offensive coordinator – Pete Carmichael; Quarterbacks – John Hufnagel; Running backs – Ray Perkins; Wide receivers – Jerry Butler; Tight Ends/Offensive Assistant – Pete Carmichael Jr.; Offensive line – Tony Sparano | Defensive coaches: Defensive coordinator/defensive line – Romeo Crennel; Linebackers – Keith Butler; Defensive backs – Jerry Holmes; Defensive assistant – Mike Pitts; Special teams coaches: Special teams – Mark Michaels; Special teams/defensive assistant – Jon Fabris; Strength and conditioning: Head strength and conditioning – Tim Jorgensen; Assistant strength/pass rush consultant – Joe Kim |

=== Final roster ===
2000 Cleveland Browns roster
| Quarterbacks (QB): 11 Jeff Brohm; 10 Tony Graziani; 18 Doug Pederson; Running backs (RB): 44 Marc Edwards FB; 34 Chris Floyd; 41 Travis Prentice; 40 Tarek Saleh FB; 30 Jamel White KR; Wide receivers (WR): 89 Bobby Brown; 84 Darrin Chiaverini; 85 Kevin Johnson; 86 Dennis Northcutt PR; 82 David Patten KR; Tight ends (TE): 83 Mark Campbell; 87 O. J. Santiago; 80 Aaron Shea | Offensive linemen (OL): 63 Brad Bedell G; 74 James Brown T; 69 Roger Chanoine T; 79 Noel LaMontagne T/G; 61 Everett Lindsay G; 72 Roman Oben T; 60 Shaun O'Hara C; 64 Dave Wohlabaugh C; 75 Steve Zahursky G/T; Defensive linemen (DL): 92 Courtney Brown DE; 93 Stalin Colinet DT; 73 Darius Holland DT; 90 Keith McKenzie DE; 98 Arnold Miller DE; 78 Tyrone Rogers DE; 99 Orpheus Roye DT; 91 Marcus Spriggs DT | Linebackers (LB): 53 Rahim Abdullah OLB; 54 Chester Burnett MLB; 50 Michael Hamilton OLB; 95 Jamir Miller OLB; 55 Marty Moore OLB; 58 Wali Rainer MLB; Defensive backs (DB): 28 Rashidi Barnes FS; 27 Lamar Chapman CB; 43 Percy Ellsworth FS; 22 Todd Franz FS; 24 Corey Fuller CB; 31 Raymond Jackson CB; 20 Earl Little SS; 26 Anthony Malbrough CB; 33 Daylon McCutcheon CB; 25 Lewis Sanders CB; 21 Marquis Smith SS; Special teams (ST): 4 Phil Dawson K; 17 Chris Gardocki P; 97 Ryan Kuehl LS | Practice squad: 49 Kyle Allamon TE; 70 Steve Estes T; 48 Rod Monroe TE; 12 Drew O'Connor WR; 47 Rashon Spikes RB; Reserve: 65 Jim Bundren G (IR); 2 Tim Couch QB (IR); 88 JaJuan Dawson WR (IR); -- Ty Detmer QB (IR); -- Madre Hill RB (IR); 81 Lenzie Jackson (IR); 56 Lenoy Jones LB (IR); 66 Jeremy McKinney G (IR); 71 Jim Pyne G (IR); 23 Errict Rhett RB (IR); -- Nick Sudano RB (IR); 51 Ryan Taylor LB (IR); 16 Kevin Thompson QB (IR); 96 Mike Thompson DT (IR); 13 Spergon Wynn QB (IR); Rookies in italics 53 active, 15 reserve, 5 practice squad |

== Preseason ==
| Week | Date | Opponent | Result | Record | Venue |
|---|---|---|---|---|---|
| 1 | July 30 | Philadelphia Eagles | W 33–22 | 1–0 | Cleveland Browns Stadium |
| 2 | August 12 | at Chicago Bears | L 6–19 | 1–1 | Soldier Field |
| 3 | August 19 | Washington Redskins | L 0–24 | 1–2 | Cleveland Browns Stadium |
| 4 | August 26 | at Green Bay Packers | L 33–34 | 1–3 | Lambeau Field |

== Regular season ==
=== Schedule ===
| Week | Date | Opponent | Result | Record | Venue | Attendance | Recap |
|---|---|---|---|---|---|---|---|
| 1 | September 3 | **Jacksonville Jaguars** | **L** 7–27 | 0–1 | Cleveland Browns Stadium | 72,418 | Recap |
| 2 | September 10 | at **Cincinnati Bengals** | **W** 24–7 | 1–1 | Paul Brown Stadium | 64,006 | Recap |
| 3 | September 17 | **Pittsburgh Steelers** | **W** 23–20 | 2–1 | Cleveland Browns Stadium | 73,018 | Recap |
| 4 | September 24 | at Oakland Raiders | **L** 10–36 | 2–2 | Network Associates Coliseum | 45,702 | Recap |
| 5 | October 1 | **Baltimore Ravens** | **L** 0–12 | 2–3 | Cleveland Browns Stadium | 73,018 | Recap |
| 6 | October 8 | at Arizona Cardinals | **L** 21–29 | 2–4 | Sun Devil Stadium | 39,148 | Recap |
| 7 | October 15 | at Denver Broncos | **L** 10–44 | 2–5 | Mile High Stadium | 75,811 | Recap |
| 8 | October 22 | at **Pittsburgh Steelers** | **L** 0–22 | 2–6 | Three Rivers Stadium | 57,659 | Recap |
| 9 | October 29 | **Cincinnati Bengals** | **L** 3–12 | 2–7 | Cleveland Browns Stadium | 73,118 | Recap |
| 10 | November 5 | New York Giants | **L** 3–24 | 2–8 | Cleveland Browns Stadium | 72,718 | Recap |
| 11 | November 12 | New England Patriots | **W** 19–11 | 3–8 | Cleveland Browns Stadium | 72,618 | Recap |
| 12 | November 19 | at **Tennessee Titans** | **L** 10–24 | 3–9 | Adelphia Coliseum | 68,498 | Recap |
| 13 | November 26 | at **Baltimore Ravens** | **L** 7–44 | 3–10 | PSINet Stadium | 68,361 | Recap |
| 14 | December 3 | at **Jacksonville Jaguars** | **L** 0–48 | 3–11 | Alltel Stadium | 51,262 | Recap |
| 15 | December 10 | Philadelphia Eagles | **L** 24–35 | 3–12 | Cleveland Browns Stadium | 72,318 | Recap |
| 16 | December 17 | **Tennessee Titans** | **L** 0–24 | 3–13 | Cleveland Browns Stadium | 72,318 | Recap |
| 17 | Bye | | | | | | |
Note: Intra-division opponents are in **bold** text.

=== Standings ===
AFC Central
| | W | L | T | PCT | PF | PA | STK |
|---|---|---|---|---|---|---|---|
| ^{(1)} Tennessee Titans | 13 | 3 | 0 | .813 | 346 | 191 | W4 |
| ^{(4)} Baltimore Ravens | 12 | 4 | 0 | .750 | 333 | 165 | W7 |
| Pittsburgh Steelers | 9 | 7 | 0 | .563 | 321 | 255 | W2 |
| Jacksonville Jaguars | 7 | 9 | 0 | .438 | 367 | 327 | L2 |
| Cincinnati Bengals | 4 | 12 | 0 | .250 | 185 | 359 | L1 |
| Cleveland Browns | 3 | 13 | 0 | .188 | 161 | 419 | L5 |

== Game summaries ==
=== Week 1: vs. Jacksonville Jaguars ===
Week 1: Jacksonville Jaguars at Cleveland Browns – Game summary

| Quarter | 1 | 2 | 3 | 4 | Total |
|---|---|---|---|---|---|
| Jaguars | 0 | 10 | 10 | 7 | 27 |
| Browns | 0 | 7 | 0 | 0 | 7 |

at Cleveland Browns Stadium, Cleveland, Ohio

- Date: September 3
- Game time: 1:00 p.m. EDT
- Game weather: Sunny, 78 °F (26 °C)
- Game attendance: 72,418
- Referee: Bernie Kukar
- TV announcers (CBS): Ian Eagle and Mark May
- Box score

Game information

First quarter

- No scoring plays.

Second quarter

- JAX – Jimmy Smith 2-yard pass from Mark Brunell (Mike Hollis kick), 11:44. Jaguars 7–0. Drive: 15 plays, 97 yards, 7:53.
- CLE – JaJuan Dawson 13-yard pass from Tim Couch (Phil Dawson kick), 3:27. Tied 7–7. Drive: 8 plays, 67 yards, 4:08.
- JAX – Mike Hollis 50-yard field goal, 0:30. Jaguars 10–7. Drive: 12 plays, 40 yards, 2:57.

Third quarter

- JAX – Stacey Mack 3-yard run (Mike Hollis kick), 7:39. Jaguars 17–7. Drive: 9 plays, 86 yards, 4:10.
- JAX – Mike Hollis 25-yard field goal, 1:20. Jaguars 20–7. Drive: 10 plays, 54 yards, 4:33.

Fourth quarter

- JAX – Chris Howard 9-yard run (Mike Hollis kick), 4:28. Jaguars 27–7. Drive: 17 plays, 68 yards, 10:18.

Top passers

- JAX – Mark Brunell – 24/34, 301 yards, TD
- CLE – Tim Couch – 19/27, 160 yards, TD

Top rushers

- JAX – Stacey Mack – 23 rushes, 74 yards, TD
- CLE – Errict Rhett – 14 rushes, 64 yards

Top receivers

- JAX – Keenan McCardell – 9 receptions, 115 yards
- CLE – JaJuan Dawson – 6 receptions, 83 yards, TD

=== Week 2: at Cincinnati Bengals ===
Week 2: Cleveland Browns at Cincinnati Bengals – Game summary

| Quarter | 1 | 2 | 3 | 4 | Total |
|---|---|---|---|---|---|
| Browns | 7 | 7 | 3 | 7 | 24 |
| Bengals | 0 | 7 | 0 | 0 | 7 |

at Paul Brown Stadium, Cincinnati, Ohio

- Date: September 10
- Game time: 1:00 p.m. EDT
- Game weather: 74 °F (23 °C)
- Game attendance: 64,006
- Referee: Phil Luckett
- Box score

Game information

First quarter

- CLE – Travis Prentice 16-yard run (Phil Dawson kick), 3:43. Browns 7–0. Drive: 7 plays, 76 yards, 3:41.

Second quarter

- CIN – Ron Dugans 4-yard pass from Akili Smith (Neil Rackers kick), 14:33. Tied 7–7. Drive: 8 plays, 78 yards, 4:10.
- CLE – Mark Campbell 5-yard pass from Tim Couch (Phil Dawson kick), 11:20. Browns 14–7. Drive: 4 plays, 16 yards, 1:37.

Third quarter

- CLE – Phil Dawson 30-yard field goal, 6:29. Browns 17–7. Drive: 11 plays, 50 yards, 6:54.

Fourth quarter

- CLE – Marc Edwards 5-yard pass from Tim Couch (Phil Dawson kick), 11:47. Browns 24–7. Drive: 9 plays, 80 yards, 5:21.

Top passers

- CLE – Tim Couch – 19/31, 259 yards, 2 TD, INT
- CIN – Akili Smith – 15/43, 250 yards, TD, 2 INT

Top rushers

- CLE – Errict Rhett – 20 rushes, 53 yards
- CIN – Corey Dillon – 12 rushes, 41 yards

Top receivers

- CLE – David Patten – 3 receptions, 95 yards
- CIN – Peter Warrick – 3 receptions, 80 yards

With their first win over the Bengals since 1995, the Browns improved to 1-1 while also securing their first victory since Week 10 of 1999, snapping a 7 game losing streak.

=== Week 3: vs. Pittsburgh Steelers ===
Week 3: Pittsburgh Steelers at Cleveland Browns – Game summary

| Quarter | 1 | 2 | 3 | 4 | Total |
|---|---|---|---|---|---|
| Steelers | 0 | 10 | 10 | 0 | 20 |
| Browns | 14 | 0 | 3 | 6 | 23 |

at Cleveland Browns Stadium, Cleveland, Ohio

- Date: September 17
- Game time: 1:00 p.m. EDT
- Game weather: 67 °F (19 °C)
- Game attendance: 73,018
- Referee: Bob McElwee
- TV announcers (CBS): Gus Johnson and Brent Jones
- Box score

Game information

First quarter

- CLE – Aaron Shea 2-yard pass from Tim Couch (Phil Dawson kick), 10:34. Browns 7–0. Drive: 7 plays, 62 yards, 4:26.
- CLE – Marc Edwards 21-yard pass from Tim Couch (Phil Dawson kick), 3:35. Browns 14–0. Drive: 7 plays, 61 yards, 4:00.

Second quarter

- PIT – Richard Huntley 4-yard run (Kris Brown kick), 13:34. Browns 14–7. Drive: 10 plays, 71 yards, 5:01.
- PIT – Kris Brown 41-yard field goal, 1:44. Browns 14–10. Drive: 8 plays, 14 yards, 3:00.

Third quarter

- PIT – Kris Brown 31-yard field goal, 12:39. Browns 14–13. Drive: 5 plays, 29 yards, 2:21.
- CLE – Phil Dawson 23-yard field goal, 10:12. Browns 17–13. Drive: 7 plays, 30 yards, 2:27.
- PIT – Jerome Bettis 10-yard run (Kris Brown kick), 5:47. Steelers 20–17. Drive: 8 plays, 80 yards, 4:25.

Fourth quarter

- CLE – Phil Dawson 28-yard field goal, 10:49. Tied 20–20. Drive: 11 plays, 87 yards, 5:06.
- CLE – Phil Dawson 19-yard field goal, 2:45. Browns 23–20. Drive: 8 plays, 95 yards, 4:12.

Top passers

- PIT – Kent Graham – 13/27, 172 yards
- CLE – Tim Couch – 23/31, 316 yards, 2 TD

Top rushers

- PIT – Jerome Bettis – 24 rushes, 133 yards, TD
- CLE – Errict Rhett – 18 rushes, 55 yards

Top receivers

- PIT – Hines Ward – 5 receptions, 75 yards
- CLE – Kevin Johnson – 4 receptions, 97 yards

With their first win at home against Pittsburgh since 1993, the Browns improved to 2-1. Their first time above .500 since 1995.

=== Week 6: at Arizona Cardinals ===
Week 6: Cleveland Browns at Arizona Cardinals – Game summary

| Quarter | 1 | 2 | 3 | 4 | Total |
|---|---|---|---|---|---|
| Browns | 7 | 7 | 0 | 7 | 21 |
| Cardinals | 0 | 16 | 10 | 3 | 29 |

at Sun Devil Stadium, Tempe, Arizona

- Date: October 8
- Game time: 4:15 p.m. EDT
- Game weather: 87 °F (30.6 °C), relative humidity 25%, wind 15 miles per hour (24 km/h; 13 kn)
- Game attendance: 44,296
- Referee: Tom White
- TV announcers (CBS): Don Criqui and Steve Tasker
- Box score

Game information

First quarter

- CLE – Travis Prentice 1-yard run (Phil Dawson kick), 1:51. Browns 7–0. Drive: 11 plays, 59 yards, 6:34.

Second quarter

- CLE – Travis Prentice 1-yard run (Phil Dawson kick), 14:26. Browns 14–0. Drive: 5 plays, 24 yards, 2:14.
- ARI – Thomas Jones 10-yard run (Cary Blanchard kick), 12:00. Browns 14–7. Drive: 5 plays, 42 yards, 2:26.
- ARI – Frank Sanders 53-yard pass from Jake Plummer (kick failed), 9:08. Browns 14–13. Drive: 2 plays, 57 yards, 0:51.
- ARI – Cary Blanchard 36-yard field goal, 1:13. Cardinals 16–14. Drive: 13 plays, 54 yards, 6:18.

Third quarter

- ARI – Cary Blanchard 47-yard field goal, 8:55. Cardinals 19–14. Drive: 9 plays, 58 yards, 3:27.
- ARI – Frank Sanders 5-yard pass from Jake Plummer (Cary Blanchard kick), 1:55. Cardinals 26–14. Drive: 9 plays, 70 yards, 4:59.

Fourth quarter

- CLE – Travis Prentice 6-yard run (Phil Dawson kick), 12:43. Cardinals 26–21. Drive: 3 plays, 24 yards, 1:29.
- ARI – Cary Blanchard 28-yard field goal, 3:00. Cardinals 29–21. Drive: 11 plays, 72 yards, 5:59.

Top passers

- CLE – Tim Couch – 16/22, 138 yards
- ARI – Jake Plummer – 17/30, 171 yards, 2 TD

Top rushers

- CLE – Travis Prentice – 28 rushes, 97 yards, 3 TD
- ARI – Michael Pittman – 16 rushes, 107 yards

Top receivers

- CLE – Dennis Northcutt – 3 receptions, 67 yards
- ARI – David Boston – 5 receptions, 63 yards

=== Week 14: at Jacksonville Jaguars ===
Week 14: Cleveland Browns at Jacksonville Jaguars – Game summary

| Quarter | 1 | 2 | 3 | 4 | Total |
|---|---|---|---|---|---|
| Browns | 0 | 0 | 0 | 0 | 0 |
| Jaguars | 3 | 17 | 21 | 7 | 48 |

at Alltel Stadium, Jacksonville, Florida

- Date: December 3
- Game time: 4:15 p.m. EST
- Game weather: Clear, 46 °F (8 °C)
- Game attendance: 51,262
- Referee: Ron Blum
- TV announcers (CBS): Don Criqui and Steve Tasker
- Box score

Game information

First quarter

- JAX – Mike Hollis 40-yard field goal, 10:44. Jaguars 3–0. Drive: 11 plays, 32 yards, 4:16.

Second quarter

- JAX – Fred Taylor 3-yard run (Mike Hollis kick), 14:56. Jaguars 10–0. Drive: 6 plays, 44 yards, 1:58.
- JAX – Mike Hollis 24-yard field goal, 3:09. Jaguars 13–0. Drive: 11 plays, 52 yards, 4:59.
- JAX – Keenan McCardell 14-yard pass from Mark Brunell (Mike Hollis kick), 0:28. Jaguars 20–0. Drive: 8 plays, 64 yards, 1:55.

Third quarter

- JAX – Fred Taylor 2-yard run (Mike Hollis kick), 7:45. Jaguars 27–0. Drive: 6 plays, 48 yards, 2:39.
- JAX – Mark Brunell 8-yard run (Mike Hollis kick), 7:20. Jaguars 34–0. Drive: 1 play, 8 yards, 0:06.
- JAX – Fred Taylor 1-yard run (Mike Hollis kick), 1:33. Jaguars 41–0. Drive: 6 plays, 69 yards, 3:31.

Fourth quarter

- JAX – Shyrone Stith 3-yard run (Mike Hollis kick), 5:27. Jaguars 48–0. Drive: 8 plays, 39 yards, 4:50.

Top passers

- CLE – Spergon Wynn – 5/16, 17 yards
- JAX – Mark Brunell – 15/31, 165 yards, TD

Top rushers

- CLE – Travis Prentice – 10 rushes, 33 yards
- JAX – Fred Taylor – 30 rushes, 181 yards, 3 TD

Top receivers

- CLE – Jamel White – 2 receptions, 11 yards
- JAX – Jimmy Smith – 6 receptions, 104 yards

== Best performances ==
- Tim Couch, Week 3, 316 Passing Yards vs. Pittsburgh Steelers
- Doug Pederson, Week 15, 309 Passing Yards vs. Philadelphia Eagles

== Awards and records ==
- Led NFL, yards punted, 4,919 yards
