= 1999 Cleveland Browns season =

51st season in franchise history, resumption of operations after dormancy

- Owner: Al Lerner
- General manager: Dwight Clark
- Head coach: Chris Palmer
- Home stadium: Cleveland Browns Stadium

Results
- Record: 2–14
- Division place: 6th AFC Central
- Playoffs: Did not qualify

The 1999 Cleveland Browns season was the Browns 51st season overall and 47th in the NFL. It marked the return of professional football to the city of Cleveland, Ohio for the first time since the 1995 season, when the franchise was temporarily deactivated following the Cleveland Browns relocation controversy, which ultimately established the Baltimore Ravens. While technically an expansion team, the team officially and legally are considered a continuation of the previous franchise, as the history and colors of the team remained in Cleveland. The franchise was still alive as a legal entity between 1996 and 1998, and its assets kept in a trust managed by the NFL until Al Lerner became the owner in 1998, taking over the role from the previous owner, Art Modell, who first initiated the relocation in the first place, to the outrage of the citizens in the city of Cleveland.

That season the Browns were given full expansion team treatment via an expansion draft and receiving the number one overall draft pick of the 1999 NFL draft, which they used to select Kentucky Wildcats quarterback and the 1998 Quarterback of the Year Tim Couch after he set the Southeastern Conference record for single-season passing yards, and he became the franchise's first draft pick following their reactivation as an expansion team. Couch would throw for over 11,000 passing yards and help the Browns qualify for the postseason in 2002, but his career would be cut short by injuries. Following attempted comebacks with the Green Bay Packers and Jacksonville Jaguars, he would retire after failing to make the final roster for either team. Although Couch would be unable to duplicate his college success, he would be the first quarterback to lead the Browns to the playoffs since their NFL return and the only to do so between 2002 and 2019. He would be inducted into the College Football Hall of Fame in 2024. Ever since then, Couch is considered by Fox Sports and other analysts to be one of the NFL's biggest draft busts in its history after being taken at number 1 overall, immediately ahead of fellow quarterback Donovan McNabb, only to falter throughout most of his career. However, Couch's career has been defended by former Browns offensive coordinator Bruce Arians.

The Browns' offense and defense both finished in the bottom of the league. The Browns scored 217 points and gained 3,762 yards of total offense, both last in the NFL. The Browns allowed 437 points and gave up 6,046 yards, ranking 29th and 31st, respectively.

== Season information ==
During the course of the 1995 season, then-Browns owner Art Modell announced his decision to move the Browns to Baltimore. Modell's new team would begin playing in the 1996 season. It would be the first time since 1935 that Cleveland would be left without an existing football team and the first time since 1943 without a team playing, when the Cleveland Rams suspended operation for one year, so the other teams could have enough players during World War II.

However, many Browns fans and Cleveland city officials were determined to keep the team in Cleveland, and orchestrated a grassroots movement to keep the team in Cleveland. The NFL responded by working with city officials, and the two parties came to a unique agreement which would provide the city with a brand-new, state-of-the-art stadium and would promise the return of professional football to Cleveland by the beginning of the 1999 season. Modell also agreed to relinquish the Browns' name, colors and team history to the new owner of the Browns. Modell's new team would begin playing in the 1996 season as the Baltimore Ravens.

While the Browns' new stadium was being built on the site of the old Cleveland Stadium, the foundation of the front office was being set in place. Al Lerner won a bidding war for the new team for $750 million. Lerner hired former San Francisco 49ers front office staffers Carmen Policy and Dwight Clark as the Browns' president and vice president.

Football finally returned to Cleveland on September 12 when the Browns opened the season against the Pittsburgh Steelers at home; Cleveland native Drew Carey was present and gave a rousing pre-game speech. However, the fans were sorely disappointed as the Browns were defeated by the Steelers 43–0. The team would go on to lose their first seven games, but finally in week 8 of their inaugural season the "New Browns" got their first ever win over the New Orleans Saints. From the Browns' 42-yard line Tim Couch squared up and threw a Hail Mary pass that was tipped in the endzone by Saints defenders but then caught by the Browns' Kevin Johnson. The dramatic game-winning touchdown play happened in the last two seconds of the game, causing the final score to be 21–16. Two weeks later, the Browns defeated the Steelers in Pittsburgh, 16–15, for their second and final win of the year.

The Browns finished the season 2–14 and sixth in the AFC Central. It was, at the time, the worst record that the Browns had ever compiled at the end of a season. Since then, the Browns finished with worse records in 2016 and 2017. The Browns did not win a home game throughout the season.

== Draft ==
=== Expansion draft ===
Below are players selected from other teams in the Cleveland expansion draft, in order of selection.

Pick	Player	Position	Original NFL team
1	Jim Pyne^	C	Detroit Lions
2	Hurvin McCormack^	DE	Dallas Cowboys
3	Scott Rehberg^	OT	New England Patriots
4	Damon Gibson^	WR	Cincinnati Bengals
5	Steve Gordon	C	San Francisco 49ers
6	Tarek Saleh^	LB	Carolina Panthers
7	Jeff Buckey	G	Miami Dolphins
8	Jason Kyle	LS	Seattle Seahawks
9	Rod Manuel	DE	Pittsburgh Steelers
10	Lenoy Jones^	LB	Tennessee Titans
11	Tim McTyer^	CB	Philadelphia Eagles
12	Elijah Alexander	LB	Indianapolis Colts
13	Pete Swanson	OT	Kansas City Chiefs
14	Gerome Williams	S	San Diego Chargers
15	Marlon Forbes^	S	Chicago Bears
16	Justin Armour	WR	Denver Broncos
17	Paul Wiggins	OT	Washington Redskins
18	Duane Butler	S	Minnesota Vikings
19	Fred Brock	WR	Arizona Cardinals
20	Kory Blackwell^	CB	New York Giants
21	Kevin Devine	CB	Jacksonville Jaguars
22	Raymond Jackson^	CB	Buffalo Bills
23	Jim Bundren^	G	New York Jets
24	Ben Cavil	G	Baltimore Ravens
25	Michael Blair	RB	Green Bay Packers
26	Antonio Anderson	DT	Dallas Cowboys
27	Orlando Bobo	G	Minnesota Vikings
28	James Williams^	LB	San Francisco 49ers
29	Scott Milanovich	QB	Tampa Bay Buccaneers
30	Eric Stokes^	S	Seattle Seahawks
31	Ronald Moore	RB	Miami Dolphins
32	Clarence Williams	RB	Buffalo Bills
33	Freddie Solomon	WR	Philadelphia Eagles
34	Brandon Sanders	S	New York Giants
35	Mike Thompson^	NT	Cincinnati Bengals
36	Jerris McPhail	RB	Detroit Lions
37	Antonio Langham^	CB	San Francisco 49ers

^ Made roster.

=== 1999 NFL draft ===
1999 Cleveland Browns draft
Round	Pick	Player	Position	College	Notes
1	1	Tim Couch	QB	Kentucky	
2	32	Kevin Johnson	WR	Syracuse	
2	45	Rahim Abdullah	LB	Clemson	Extra selection
3	62	Daylon McCutcheon	CB	USC	
3	76	Marquis Smith	S	California	
4	124	Wali Rainer	LB	Virginia	from San Francisco
5	148	Darrin Chiaverini	WR	Colorado	Extra selection
6	174	Marcus Spriggs	DT	Troy	from Chicago
6	187	Kendall Ogle	LB	Maryland	from Seattle
6	191	James Dearth	LS	Tarleton State	from New England via Seattle
7	207	Madre Hill	RB	Arkansas	
Made roster

=== Undrafted free agents ===
1999 undrafted free agents of note
Player	Position	College
Tim Beauchamp	Defensive end	Florida
Mark Campbell	Tight end	Michigan
Mike Cook	Quarterback	William & Mary
Chris Hanson	Punter	Marshall
Joseph Nastasi	Wide receiver	Penn State

== Personnel ==
=== Staff ===
1999 Cleveland Browns staff
Front office: Owner and chairman – Alfred Lerner; President and chief executive officer – Carmen Policy; Executive vice president/director of football operations – Dwight Clark; Executive director of player personnel – Joe Collins; Director of college personnel – Phil Neri; Director of pro personnel – Keith Kidd; Head coaches: Head coach – Chris Palmer; Offensive coaches: Quarterbacks – John Hufnagel; Running backs – Dick Portee; Wide receivers – Jerry Butler; Tight ends – Ray Perkins; Offensive line – Bob Palcic; Offensive quality control – Tony Sparano	Defensive coaches: Defensive coordinator – Bob Slowik; Defensive line – Clarence Brooks; Linebackers – Keith Butler; Defensive backs – Jerry Holmes; Defensive quality control – Billy Davis; Special teams coaches: Special teams – Ken Whisenhunt; Special teams quality control – Mark Michaels; Strength and conditioning: Head strength and conditioning – Tim Jorgensen; Assistant strength/pass rush consultant – Joe Kim; Assistant strength – Aril Smith

=== Final roster ===
1999 Cleveland Browns roster
Quarterbacks (QB): 2 Tim Couch; 11 Ty Detmer; 10 Jamie Martin; Running backs (RB): 27 Karim Abdul-Jabbar; 44 Marc Edwards FB; 34 Madre Hill KR; 42 Terry Kirby; 40 Tarek Saleh FB; Wide receivers (WR): 84 Darrin Chiaverini; 87 Zola Davis; 81 Damon Dunn; 85 Kevin Johnson PR; 80 Ronnie Powell KR; Tight ends (TE): 88 James Dearth; 82 Irv Smith	Offensive linemen (OL): 74 Orlando Bobo G; 65 Jim Bundren C; 69 Roger Chanoine T; 66 Jeremy McKinney G; 71 Jim Pyne G; 79 Scott Rehberg T; 68 Chris Ruhman T; 64 Dave Wohlabaugh C; 75 Steve Zahursky G/T; Defensive linemen (DL): 94 Derrick Alexander DE; 93 Stalin Colinet DE/DT; 62 Bill Duff DT; 73 Darius Holland DT; 99 Hurvin McCormack DE; 98 Arnold Miller DE; 78 Tyrone Rogers DE; 53 John Thierry DE; 96 Mike Thompson DT	Linebackers (LB): 55 Rahim Abdullah OLB; 51 Lenoy Jones OLB; 95 Jamir Miller OLB; 59 Kendall Ogle OLB; 58 Wali Rainer MLB; 90 James Williams MLB; Defensive backs (DB): 39 Marlon Forbes FS; 24 Corey Fuller CB/FS; 31 Raymond Jackson CB; 38 Antonio Langham CB; 20 Earl Little FS; 33 Daylon McCutcheon CB; 47 Ryan McNeil CB; 23 Marquez Pope SS; 21 Marquis Smith SS; Special teams (ST): 4 Phil Dawson K; 17 Chris Gardocki P; 97 Ryan Kuehl LS	Practice squad: 70 Geno Bell DT; -- Chad Carpenter WR; -- Isaiah Mustafa WR; 56 Ryan Taylor LB; 43 Marcus Washington CB/S; Reserve: 76 Lomas Brown T (IR); 77 Orlando Brown T (Susp.); 83 Mark Campbell TE (IR); 67 John Jurkovic DT (IR); 57 Jason Kyle LS (IR); 22 Tim McTyer S (IR); 89 Randy Palmer TE (IR); 86 Leslie Shepherd WR (IR); 54 Chris Spielman LB (IR); 91 Marcus Spriggs DT (IR); Rookies in italics 51 active, 10 reserve, 5 practice squad

== Preseason ==
Week	Date	Opponent	Result	Record	Venue	Recap
HOF	August 9	Dallas Cowboys	W 20–17 (OT)	1–0	Fawcett Stadium (Canton, Ohio)	Recap
1	August 14	at Tampa Bay Buccaneers	L 3–30	1–1	Raymond James Stadium	Recap
2	August 21	Minnesota Vikings	L 17–27	1–2	Cleveland Browns Stadium	Recap
3	August 28	Chicago Bears	W 35–24	2–2	Cleveland Browns Stadium	Recap
4	September 2	at Philadelphia Eagles	L 17–30	2–3	Veterans Stadium	Recap

== Regular season ==
=== Schedule ===
Week	Date	Opponent	Result	Record	Venue	Recap
1	September 12	**Pittsburgh Steelers**	**L** 0–43	0–1	Cleveland Browns Stadium	Recap
2	September 19	at **Tennessee Titans**	**L** 9–26	0–2	Adelphia Coliseum	Recap
3	September 26	at **Baltimore Ravens**	**L** 10–17	0–3	PSINet Stadium	Recap
4	October 3	New England Patriots	**L** 7–19	0–4	Cleveland Browns Stadium	Recap
5	October 10	**Cincinnati Bengals**	**L** 17–18	0–5	Cleveland Browns Stadium	Recap
6	October 17	at **Jacksonville Jaguars**	**L** 7–24	0–6	Alltel Stadium	Recap
7	October 24	at St. Louis Rams	**L** 3–34	0–7	Trans World Dome	Recap
8	October 31	at New Orleans Saints	**W** 21–16	1–7	Louisiana Superdome	Recap
9	November 7	**Baltimore Ravens**	**L** 9–41	1–8	Cleveland Browns Stadium	Recap
10	November 14	at **Pittsburgh Steelers**	**W** 16–15	2–8	Three Rivers Stadium	Recap
11	November 21	Carolina Panthers	**L** 17–31	2–9	Cleveland Browns Stadium	Recap
12	November 28	**Tennessee Titans**	**L** 21–33	2–10	Cleveland Browns Stadium	Recap
13	December 5	at San Diego Chargers	**L** 10–23	2–11	Qualcomm Stadium	Recap
14	December 12	at **Cincinnati Bengals**	**L** 28–44	2–12	Cinergy Field	Recap
15	December 19	**Jacksonville Jaguars**	**L** 14–24	2–13	Cleveland Browns Stadium	Recap
16	December 26	Indianapolis Colts	**L** 28–29	2–14	Cleveland Browns Stadium	Recap
17	Bye					
Note: Intra-division opponents are in **bold** text.

=== Season summary ===
==== Week 1: vs. Pittsburgh Steelers ====
Week One: Pittsburgh Steelers at Cleveland Browns – Game summary

Quarter	1	2	3	4	Total
**Steelers**	7	13	6	17	**43**
Browns	0	0	0	0	**0**

at Cleveland Browns Stadium, Cleveland, Ohio

- Date: September 12
- Game time: 8:25 p.m. EDT
- Game weather: Overcast, 80 °F (27 °C)
- Game attendance: 73,138
- Referee: Bob McElwee
- TV announcers (ESPN): Mike Patrick, Joe Theismann, Paul Maguire, and Solomon Wilcots
- Box score

Game information

**First quarter**

- PIT – Kordell Stewart 1-yard run (Kris Brown kick), 5:16. Steelers 7–0. **Drive: 5 plays, 39 yards, 2:30.**

**Second quarter**

- PIT – Kris Brown 18-yard field goal, 9:56. Steelers 10–0. **Drive: 18 plays, 79 yards, 7:37.**
- PIT – Richard Huntley 5-yard pass from Kordell Stewart (Kris Brown kick), 4:49. Steelers 17–0. **Drive: 6 plays, 56 yards, 3:06.**
- PIT – Kris Brown 28-yard field goal, 0:06. Steelers 20–0. **Drive: 8 plays, 44 yards, 3:31.**

**Third quarter**

- PIT – Richard Huntley 3-yard run (kick failed), 5:28. Steelers 26–0. **Drive: 14 plays, 76 yards, 7:55.**

**Fourth quarter**

- PIT – Kris Brown 19-yard field goal, 11:10. Steelers 29–0. **Drive: 14 plays, 64 yards, 8:00.**
- PIT – Richard Huntley 21-yard pass from Mike Tomczak (Kris Brown kick), 10:48. Steelers 36–0. **Drive: 1 play, 21 yards, 0:09.**
- PIT – Hines Ward 1-yard pass from Mike Tomczak (Kris Brown kick), 6:08. Steelers 43–0. **Drive: 7 plays, 29 yards, 4:19.**

Top passers

- PIT – Kordell Stewart – 15/23, 173 yards, TD
- CLE – Ty Detmer – 6/13, 52 yards, INT

Top rushers

- PIT – Jerome Bettis – 18 rushes, 89 yards
- CLE – Terry Kirby – 5 rushes, 10 yards

Top receivers

- PIT – Richard Huntley – 5 receptions, 67 yards, 2 TD
- CLE – Leslie Shepherd – 2 receptions, 32 yards

After being deactivated for three seasons, the Cleveland Browns returned to the NFL, playing their first game since December 24, 1995 and first home game since December 17, 1995. The game was featured on ESPN Sunday Night Football and a pre-game speech was given by comedian Drew Carey, a Cleveland native. In his speech, Carey said "I want to send a message. A message to everyone who ever made fun of Cleveland. A message to anyone who ever told a Cleveland joke, or laughed at a Cleveland joke. You can now officially shut up!" The celebration would be short-lived as the Steelers would shutout the Browns 43–0. The Browns would finish the game with only 40 yards of total offense and committed four turnovers and had a time of possession of just 12:11.

==== Week 2: at Tennessee Titans ====
Week Two: Cleveland Browns at Tennessee Titans – Game summary

Quarter	1	2	3	4	Total
Browns	0	3	6	0	**9**
**Titans**	2	14	3	7	**26**

at Adelphia Coliseum, Nashville, Tennessee

- Date: September 26
- Game time: 1:00 p.m. EDT / 12:00 p.m. CDT
- Game weather: 86 °F (30 °C), wind 10 mph
- Game attendance: 65,904
- Referee: Ed Hochuli
- TV announcers (CBS): Bill Macatee and Beasley Reece
- Box score

Game information

**First quarter**

- TEN – Tim Couch sacked in end zone, 4:46. Titans 2–0.

**Second quarter**

- TEN – Eddie George 1-yard run (Al Del Greco kick), 12:59. Titans 9–0. **Drive: 12 plays, 59 yards, 6:47.**
- CLE – Phil Dawson 41-yard field goal, 6:50. Titans 9–3. **Drive: 5 plays, 10 yards, 1:59.**
- TEN – Eddie George 1-yard run (Al Del Greco kick), 2:21. Titans 16–3. **Drive: 9 plays, 66 yards, 4:29.**

**Third quarter**

- TEN – Al Del Greco 35-yard field goal, 6:39. Titans 19–3. **Drive: 12 plays, 64 yards, 6:19.**
- CLE – Kevin Johnson 39-yard pass from Tim Couch (pass failed), 2:51. Titans 19–9. **Drive: 7 plays, 78 yards, 3:48.**

**Fourth quarter**

- TEN – Yancey Thigpen 14-yard pass from Neil O'Donnell (Al Del Greco kick), 9:52. Titans 26–9. **Drive: 14 plays, 60 yards, 7:59.**

**Top passers**

- CLE – Tim Couch – 12/24, 134 yards, TD
- TEN – Neil O'Donnell – 31/40, 310 yards, TD

**Top rushers**

- CLE – Terry Kirby – 10 rushes 40 yards
- TEN – Eddie George – 31 rushes, 97 yards, 2 TD

**Top receivers**

- CLE – Kevin Johnson – 4 receptions, 62 yards, TD
- TEN – Yancey Thigpen – 6 receptions, 84 yards, TD

Kicker Phil Dawson made a 41-yard field goal in the second quarter, scoring the Browns' first points of the season. Cleveland would score its first touchdown of the season in the third quarter, with a 39-yard pass from Tim Couch to Kevin Johnson. Despite this, the Titans thrashed the Browns 26–9.

==== Week 3: at Baltimore Ravens ====
Week Three: Cleveland Browns at Baltimore Ravens – Game summary

Quarter	1	2	3	4	Total
Browns	0	0	3	7	**10**
**Ravens**	3	7	7	0	**17**

at PSINet Stadium, Baltimore, Maryland

- Date: September 26
- Game time: 1:00 p.m. EDT
- Game weather: 72 °F (22 °C), wind 8 mph
- Game attendance: 68,803
- Referee: Bernie Kukar
- Box score

Game information

**First quarter**

- BAL – Matt Stover 44-yard field goal, 2:14. Ravens 3–0. **Drive: 8 plays, 54 yards, 4:31.**

**Second quarter**

- BAL – Stoney Case 1-yard run (Matt Stover kick), 10:31. Ravens 10–0. **Drive: 2 plays, 1 yard, 0:40.**

**Third quarter**

- CLE – Phil Dawson 49-yard field goal, 13:19. Ravens 10–3. **Drive: 4 plays, 3 yards, 1:24.**
- BAL – Stoney Case 1-yard run (Matt Stover kick), 5:30. Ravens 17–3. **Drive: 7 plays, 69 yards, 3:59.**

**Fourth quarter**

- CLE – Kevin Johnson 12-yard pass from Tim Couch (Phil Dawson kick), 15:00. Ravens 17–10. **Drive: 4 plays, 83 yards, 2:25.**

**Top passers**

- CLE – Tim Couch – 13/23, 123 yards, TD, INT
- BAL – Stoney Case – 12/25, 165 yards, 3 INT

**Top rushers**

- CLE – Terry Kirby – 18 rushes, 51 yards
- BAL – Errict Rhett – 22 rushes, 113 yards

**Top receivers**

- CLE – Terry Kirby – 7 receptions, 75 yards
- BAL – Qadry Ismail – 2 receptions, 49 yards

This was the first meeting between the reactivated Cleveland Browns and the Baltimore Ravens, the latter of which previously played in Cleveland as the Browns from 1946 to 1995 before a controversial relocation. As a compromise by the NFL, the Browns were officially deactivated in 1996 while the team in Baltimore was considered an expansion team. The game would be a defensive battle with poor offensive performance, as both teams committed three turnovers. The Browns, down by seven with 2:34 to go, had the ball and were looking to tie the game, but Tim Couch threw an interception to Chris McAlister. The Ravens would run out the clock to win the game.

==== Week 4: vs. New England Patriots ====
Week Four: New England Patriots at Cleveland Browns – Game summary

Quarter	1	2	3	4	Total
**Patriots**	0	6	7	6	**19**
Browns	7	0	0	0	**7**

at Cleveland Browns Stadium, Cleveland, Ohio

- Date: October 3
- Game time: 1:00 p.m. EDT
- Game weather: Sunny, 59 °F (15 °C)
- Game attendance: 72,368
- Referee: Jeff Triplette
- Box score

Game information

**First quarter**

- CLE – Kevin Johnson 64-yard pass from Tim Couch (Phil Dawson kick), 4:31. Browns 7–0. **Drive: 2 plays, 64 yards, 0:47.**

**Second quarter**

- NE – Adam Vinatieri 23-yard field goal, 10:21. Browns 7–3. **Drive: 10 plays, 67 yards, 5:02.**
- NE – Adam Vinatieri 21-yard field goal, 0:26. Browns 7–6. **Drive: 11 plays, 45 yards, 3:49.**

**Third quarter**

- NE – Terry Allen 3-yard run (Adam Vinatieri kick), 9:23. Patriots 13–7. **Drive: 12 plays, 80 yards, 5:37.**

**Fourth quarter**

- NE – Terry Glenn 54-yard pass from Drew Bledsoe (pass failed), 15:00. Patriots 19–7. **Drive: 4 plays, 80 yards, 1:21.**

**Top passers**

- NE – Drew Bledsoe – 29/43, 393 yards, TD
- CLE – Tim Couch – 13/28, 201 yards, TD

**Top rushers**

- NE – Terry Allen – 21 rushes, 68 yards, TD
- CLE – Terry Kirby – 15 rushes, 71 yards

**Top receivers**

- NE – Terry Glenn – 13 receptions, 214 yards, TD
- CLE – Kevin Johnson – 6 receptions, 131 yards, TD

==== Week 5: vs. Cincinnati Bengals ====
Week Five: Cincinnati Bengals at Cleveland Browns – Game summary

Quarter	1	2	3	4	Total
**Bengals**	6	6	0	6	**18**
Browns	0	14	0	3	**17**

at Cleveland Browns Stadium, Cleveland, Ohio

- Date: October 10
- Game time: 1:00 p.m. EDT
- Game weather: Rain, 65 °F (18 °C)
- Game attendance: 73,048
- Referee: Ron Winter
- Box score

Game information

**First quarter**

- CIN – Doug Pelfrey 27-yard field goal, 10:57. Bengals 3–0. **Drive: 8 plays, 66 yards, 4:03.**
- CIN – Doug Pelfrey 26-yard field goal, 1:51. Bengals 6–0. **Drive: 15 plays, 90 yards, 6:31.**

**Second quarter**

- CLE – Phil Dawson 4-yard run (Phil Dawson kick), 13:46. Browns 7–6. **Drive: 9 plays, 63 yards, 3:05.**
- CLE – Terry Kirby 1-yard run (Phil Dawson kick), 12:04. Browns 14–6. **Drive: 3 plays, 52 yards, 1:27.**
- CIN – Carl Pickens 5-yard pass from Akili Smith (pass failed), 1:08. Browns 14–12. **Drive: 11 plays, 85 yards, 5:07.**

**Third quarter**

- No scoring plays

**Fourth quarter**

- CLE – Phil Dawson 33-yard field goal, 14:09. Browns 17–12. **Drive: 4 plays, 3 yards, 1:39.**
- CIN – Carl Pickens 2-yard pass from Akili Smith (run failed), 0:05. Bengals 18–17. **Drive: 10 plays, 80 yards, 1:59.**

**Top passers**

- CIN – Akili Smith – 25/42, 221 yards, 2 TD
- CLE – Tim Couch – 15/27, 164 yards, INT

**Top rushers**

- CIN – Corey Dillon – 28 rushes, 168 yards
- CLE – Terry Kirby – 15 rushes, 57 yards, TD

**Top receivers**

- CIN – Darnay Scott – 8 receptions, 110 yards
- CLE – Kevin Johnson – 5 receptions, 73 yards

==== Week 6: at Jacksonville Jaguars ====
Week Six: Cleveland Browns at Jacksonville Jaguars – Game summary

Quarter	1	2	3	4	Total
Browns	0	7	0	0	**7**
**Jaguars**	3	3	8	10	**24**

at Alltel Stadium, Jacksonville, Florida

- Date: October 17
- Game time: 1:00 p.m. EDT
- Game weather: Sunny, 71 °F (22 °C)
- Game attendance: 62,047
- Referee: Tony Corrente
- Box score

Game information

**First quarter**

- JAX – Mike Hollis 20-yard field goal, 2:53. Jaguars 3–0. **Drive: 15 plays, 68 yards, 8:14.**

**Second quarter**

- CLE – Terry Kirby 9-yard pass from Tim Couch (Phil Dawson kick), 12:21. Browns 7–3. **Drive: 12 plays, 70 yards, 5:32.**
- JAX – Mike Hollis 36-yard field goal, 0:51. Jaguars 6–3. **Drive: 7 plays, 38 yards, 1:43.**

**Third quarter**

- JAX – Kyle Brady 7-yard pass from Jay Fiedler (Jay Fiedler pass to Kyle Brady), 1:47. Jaguars 14–3. **Drive: 3 plays, 25 yards, 1:13.**

**Fourth quarter**

- JAX – James Stewart 2-yard run (Mike Hollis kick), 5:54. Jaguars 21–3. **Drive: 12 plays, 70 yards, 6:40.**
- JAX – Mike Hollis 24-yard field goal, 0:44. Jaguars 24–3. **Drive: 11 plays, 42 yards, 3:57.**

**Top passers**

- CLE – Tim Couch – 18/23, 161 yards, TD
- JAX – Jay Fiedler – 12/14, 113 yards, TD

**Top rushers**

- CLE – Terry Kirby – 22 rushes, 71 yards
- JAX – James Stewart – 23 rushes, 58 yards, TD

**Top receivers**

- CLE – Darrin Chiaverini – 5 receptions, 45 yards
- JAX – Keenan McCardell – 7 receptions, 76 yards

==== Week 7: at St. Louis Rams ====
Week Seven: Cleveland Browns at St. Louis Rams – Game summary

Quarter	1	2	3	4	Total
Browns	3	0	0	0	**3**
**Rams**	14	7	3	10	**34**

at Trans World Dome, St. Louis, Missouri

- Date: October 24
- Game time: 1:00 p.m. EDT
- Game weather: None (indoor stadium)
- Game attendance: 65,866
- Referee: Walt Coleman
- TV announcers (CBS): Gus Johnson and Brent Jones
- Box score

Game information

**First quarter**

- STL – Roland Williams 1-yard pass from Kurt Warner (Jeff Wilkins kick), 8:34. Rams 7–0. **Drive: 11 plays, 75 yards, 6:26.**
- STL – Isaac Bruce 4-yard pass from Kurt Warner (Jeff Wilkins kick), 6:49. Rams 14–0. **Drive: 4 plays, 28 yards, 1:33.**
- CLE – Phil Dawson 47-yard field goal, 0:17. Rams 14–3. **Drive: 13 plays, 51 yards, 6:32.**

**Second quarter**

- STL – Roland Williams 1-yard pass from Kurt Warner (Jeff Wilkins kick), 10:59. Rams 21–3. **Drive: 8 plays, 69 yards, 4:18.**

**Third quarter**

- STL – Jeff Wilkins 28-yard field goal, 3:13. Rams 24–3. **Drive: 7 plays, 45 yards, 3:33.**

**Fourth quarter**

- STL – Marshall Faulk 33-yard run (Jeff Wilkins kick), 14:50. Rams 31–3. **Drive: 4 plays, 73 yards, 1:57.**
- STL – Jeff Wilkins 36-yard field goal, 4:06. Rams 34–3. **Drive: 11 plays, 60 yards, 5:38.**

**Top passers**

- CLE – Tim Couch – 22/40, 185 yards, 2 INT
- STL – Kurt Warner – 23/29, 203 yards, 3 TD

**Top rushers**

- CLE – Tim Couch – 2 rushes, 50 yards
- STL – Marshall Faulk – 16 rushes, 133 yards, TD

**Top receivers**

- CLE – Leslie Shepherd – 6 receptions, 85 yards
- STL – Marshall Faulk – 9 receptions, 67 yards

==== Week 8: at New Orleans Saints ====
Week Eight: Cleveland Browns at New Orleans – Game summary

Quarter	1	2	3	4	Total
**Browns**	0	7	7	7	**21**
Saints	7	3	3	3	**16**

at Louisiana Superdome, New Orleans, Louisiana

- Date: October 31
- Game time: 12:00 p.m. CST / 1:00 p.m. EST
- Game weather: None (indoor stadium)
- Game attendance: 48,817
- Referee: Mike Carey
- TV announcers (CBS): Don Criqui and Steve Tasker
- Box score

Game information

**First quarter**

- NO – Keith Poole 5-yard pass from Billy Joe Hobert (Doug Brien kick), 3:59. Saints 7–0. **Drive: 4 plays, 15 yards, 2:08.**

**Second quarter**

- CLE – Marc Edwards 27-yard pass from Tim Couch (Phil Dawson kick), 7:37. Tied 7–7. **Drive: 1 play, 22 yards, 0:06.**
- NO – Doug Brien 49-yard field goal, 0:08. Saints 10–7. **Drive: 9 plays, 42 yards, 0:58.**

**Third quarter**

- CLE – Kevin Johnson 24-yard pass from Tim Couch (Phil Dawson kick), 8:53. Browns 14–10. **Drive: 2 plays, 22 yards, 0:44.**
- NO – Doug Brien 22-yard field goal, 1:15. Browns 14–13. **Drive: 13 plays, 56 yards, 7:38.**

**Fourth quarter**

- NO – Doug Brien 46-yard field goal, 0:21. Saints 16–14. **Drive: 8 plays, 35 yards, 3:20.**
- CLE – Kevin Johnson 56-yard pass from Tim Couch (Phil Dawson kick), 0:00. Browns 21–16. **Drive: 3 plays, 75 yards, 0:21.**

**Top passers**

- CLE – Tim Couch – 11/19, 193 yards, 3 TD
- NO – Billy Joe Tolliver – 9/20, 92 yards, INT

**Top rushers**

- CLE – Karim Abdul-Jabbar – 13 rushes, 39 yards
- NO – Ricky Williams – 40 rushes, 179 yards

**Top receivers**

- CLE – Kevin Johnson – 4 receptions, 96 yards, 2 TD
- NO – Aaron Craver – 2 receptions, 32 yards

The 0–7 Browns headed to New Orleans to take on the 1–6 Saints. The Saints would score first, with quarterback Billy Joe Hobert throwing a five yard touchdown pass to wide receiver Keith Poole. The Browns would respond midway through the second quarter with fullback Marc Edwards on a 27-yard catch-and-run from Tim Couch to tie the game at 7–7. New Orleans kicker Doug Brien made a 49-yard field goal in the waning seconds of the first half to put the Saints up 10–7. Cleveland would take its first lead of the game with a 24-yard touchdown pass from Couch to wide receiver Kevin Johnson in the third quarter. Brien would make two more field goals, giving the Saints a 16–14 lead with just 0:21 left in the game. Cleveland started the final drive at its own 25-yard line, needing to score a touchdown in under 15 seconds to win the game. On the first play, Couch's pass to wide receiver Darrin Chiaverini fell incomplete, being broken up by Willie Clay. The next play, Couch completed a 19-yard pass to Leslie Shepherd to the Cleveland 44-yard line. Head coach Chris Palmer would immediately call a timeout with just 0:02 left. Down to the Browns' last chance for a win, Couch would heave up a 56-yard Hail Mary that was caught by Johnson in the end zone for the game-winning touchdown. With the last-second win, the Browns got their first victory since being reactivated and was the franchise's first win since December 17, 1995.

The Browns had 243 yards of total offense and maintained possession of the ball for only 19:10; the Saints had 351 total yards and possessed the ball for 40:50. However, Cleveland only turned the ball over once while New Orleans had five turnovers.

==== Week 9: vs. Baltimore Ravens ====
Week Nine: Baltimore Ravens at Cleveland Browns – Game summary

Quarter	1	2	3	4	Total
**Ravens**	7	10	7	17	**41**
Browns	3	0	0	6	**9**

at Cleveland Browns Stadium, Cleveland, Ohio

- Date: November 7
- Game time: 1:00 p.m. EST
- Game weather: Clear, 47 °F (8 °C)
- Game attendance: 72,898
- Referee: Gerry Austin
- Box score

Fresh off their first win since 1995, the Browns hoped to get revenge on the Ravens and get two wins in a row. However, thanks to a flurry of touchdowns and field goals by the Ravens, the Browns lost 41-9 and fell to 1-8.

==== Week 10: at Pittsburgh Steelers ====
Week Ten: Cleveland Browns at Pittsburgh Steelers – Game summary

Quarter	1	2	3	4	Total
**Browns**	7	0	0	9	**16**
Steelers	3	0	9	3	**15**

at Three Rivers Stadium, Pittsburgh, Pennsylvania

- Date: November 14
- Game time: 1:00 p.m. EST
- Game weather: Partly sunny, 58 °F (14 °C)
- Game attendance: 58,213
- Referee: Johnny Grier
- TV announcers (CBS): Craig Bolerjack and Beasley Reece
- Box score

Game information

**First quarter**

- CLE – Kevin Johnson 35-yard pass from Tim Couch (Phil Dawson kick), 12:25. Browns 7–0. **Drive: 5 plays, 80 yards, 2:35.**
- PIT – Kris Brown 41-yard field goal, 7:34. Browns 7–3. **Drive: 10 plays, 47 yards, 4:51.**

**Second quarter**

- No scoring plays

**Third quarter**

- PIT – Kris Brown 32-yard field goal, 9:57. Browns 7–6. **Drive: 10 plays, 51 yards, 5:03.**
- PIT – Richard Huntley 5-yard run (run failed), 8:18. Steelers 12–7. **Drive: 3 plays, 8 yards, 0:41.**

**Fourth quarter**

- PIT – Kris Brown 47-yard field goal, 10:10. Steelers 15–7. **Drive: 10 plays, 51 yards, 5:50.**
- CLE – Marc Edwards 5-yard pass from Tim Couch (run failed), 5:12. Steelers 15–13. **Drive: 3 plays, 15 yards, 1:14.**
- CLE – Phil Dawson 39-yard field goal, 0:00. Browns 16–15. **Drive: 5 plays, 58 yards, 1:51.**

**Top passers**

- CLE – Tim Couch – 18/28, 199 yards, 2 TD, INT
- PIT – Kordell Stewart – 15/32, 137 yards, 2 INT

**Top rushers**

- CLE – Karim Abdul-Jabbar – 18 rushes, 56 yards
- PIT – Jerome Bettis – 26 rushes, 99 yards

**Top receivers**

- CLE – Kevin Johnson – 5 receptions, 73 yards, TD
- PIT – Hines Ward – 4 receptions, 39 yards

The Browns traveled to Pittsburgh to square off against the Steelers, hoping to get revenge on what happened on opening day. In the first half, the Browns had a 7-3 lead. However, by the second half, their lead disappeared as the Steelers lead 15-13. With almost no time remaining, Phil Dawson made a 39-yard field goal, as the Browns defeated the Steelers 16-15; securing their second win of the season.

==== Week 11: vs. Carolina Panthers ====
Week Eleven: Carolina Panthers at Cleveland Browns – Game summary

Quarter	1	2	3	4	Total
**Panthers**	3	14	7	7	**31**
Browns	0	3	0	14	**17**

at Cleveland Browns Stadium, Cleveland, Ohio

- Date: November 21
- Game time: 1:00 p.m. EST
- Game weather: Clear, 48 °F (9 °C)
- Game attendance: 72,818
- Referee: Dick Hantak
- Box score

==== Week 12: vs. Tennessee Titans ====
Week 12: Tennessee Titans at Cleveland Browns – Game summary

Quarter	1	2	3	4	Total
**Titans**	7	6	13	7	**33**
Browns	0	14	0	7	**21**

at Cleveland Browns Stadium, Cleveland, Ohio

- Date: November 28
- Game time: 1:00 p.m. EST
- Game weather: Partly cloudy, 38 °F (3 °C)
- Game attendance: 72,008
- Referee: Bernie Kukar
- Box score

With their second straight loss, the Browns would be eliminated from playoff contention at 2-10.

==== Week 13: at San Diego Chargers ====
Week Thirteen: Cleveland Browns at San Diego Chargers – Game summary

Quarter	1	2	3	4	Total
Browns	3	7	0	0	**10**
**Chargers**	3	10	3	7	**23**

at Qualcomm Stadium, San Diego, California

- Date: December 5
- Game time: 1:00 p.m. EST / 10:00 a.m. PST
- Game weather: 68 °F (20 °C), wind 7 MPH
- Game attendance: 53,147
- Referee: Tony Corrente
- Box score

Game information

**First quarter**

- CLE – Phil Dawson 33-yard field goal, 9:30. Browns 3–0. **Drive: 12 plays, 45 yards, 5:30.**
- SD – John Carney 44-yard field goal, 1:08. Tied 3–3. **Drive: 6 plays, 27 yards, 2:04.**

**Second quarter**

- SD – John Carney 19-yard field goal, 8:01. Chargers 6–3. **Drive: 9 plays, 63 yards, 4:48.**
- SD – Kenny Bynum 1-yard run (John Carney kick), 2:11. Chargers 13–6. **Drive: 9 plays, 42 yards, 3:26.**
- CLE – Kevin Johnson 19-yard pass from Tim Couch (Phil Dawson kick), 0:06. Chargers 13–10. **Drive: 9 plays, 70 yards, 2:05.**

**Third quarter**

- SD – John Carney 30-yard field goal, 7:41. Chargers 16–10. **Drive: 15 plays, 52 yards, 7:19.**

**Fourth quarter**

- SD – Jermaine Fazande 2-yard run (John Carney kick), 6:28. Chargers 23–10. **Drive: 11 plays, 57 yards, 7:15.**

**Top passers**

- CLE – Tom Couch – 18/29, 184 yards, TD, 2 INT
- SD – Jim Harbaugh – 16/23, 161 yards

**Top rushers**

- CLE – Karim Abdul-Jabbar – 10 rushes, 29 yards
- SD – Kenny Bynum – 17 rushes, 60 yards

**Top receivers**

- CLE – Kevin Johnson – 5 receptions, 41 yards, TD
- SD – Jeff Graham – 5 receptions, 82 yards

The Browns faced the 4–7 Chargers in San Diego. The first quarter started low-key as both teams notched field goals, respectively from Phil Dawson (33 yards) and John Carney (44 yards). However, by the second quarter, San Diego dominated the rest of the game, with touchdowns from Kenny Bynum and Jermaine Fazande, leading the Chargers to victory.

==== Week 14: at Cincinnati Bengals ====
Week Fourteen: Cleveland Browns at Cincinnati Bengals – Game summary

Quarter	1	2	3	4	Total
Browns	7	8	6	7	**28**
**Bengals**	10	20	14	0	**44**

at Cinergy Field, Cincinnati, Ohio

- Date: December 12
- Game time: 1:00 p.m. EST
- Game weather: Rain, 41 °F (5 °C)
- Game attendance: 59,972
- Referee: Ron Winter
- Box score

==== Week 15: vs. Jacksonville Jaguars ====
Week Fifteen: Jacksonville Jaguars at Cleveland Browns – Game summary

Quarter	1	2	3	4	Total
**Jaguars**	0	14	3	7	**24**
Browns	0	7	7	0	**14**

at Cleveland Browns Stadium, Cleveland, Ohio

- Date: December 19
- Game time: 1:00 p.m. EST
- Game weather: Clear, 39 °F (4 °C)
- Game attendance: 72,038
- Referee: Jeff Triplette
- Box score

==== Week 16: vs. Indianapolis Colts ====
Week Sixteen: Indianapolis Colts at Cleveland Browns – Game summary

Quarter	1	2	3	4	Total
**Colts**	0	13	6	10	**29**
Browns	7	7	14	0	**28**

at Cleveland Browns Stadium, Cleveland, Ohio

- Date: December 26
- Game time: 12:00 p.m. EST
- Game weather: 31 °F (−1 °C), wind 25 mph
- Game attendance: 72,618
- Referee: Phil Luckett
- Box score

Game information

**First quarter**

- CLE – Terry Kirby 1-yard run (Phil Dawson kick), 4:10. Browns 7–0. **Drive: 12 plays, 53 yards, 5:47.**

**Second quarter**

- IND – Edgerrin James 1-yard run (Mike Vanderjagt kick), 14:06. Tied 7–7. **Drive: 9 plays, 72 yards, 5:04.**
- CLE – Darrin Chiaverini 28-yard pass from Ty Detmer (Phil Dawson kick), 9:56. Browns 14–7. **Drive: 7 plays, 67 yards, 4:10.**
- IND – Mike Vanderjagt 41-yard field goal, 1:56. Browns 14–10. **Drive: 13 plays, 66 yards, 6:19.**
- IND – Mike Vanderjagt 19-yard field goal, 0:00. Browns 14–13. **Drive: 6 plays, 32 yards, 0:51.**

**Third quarter**

- CLE – Ty Detmer 8-yard run (Phil Dawson kick), 10:47. Browns 21–13. **Drive: 7 plays, 60 yards, 4:13.**
- IND – Edgerrin James 1-yard run (pass failed), 7:04. Browns 21–19. **Drive: 6 plays, 69 yards, 3:43.**
- CLE – Terry Kirby 1-yard run (Phil Dawson kick), 0:11. Browns 28–19. **Drive: 7 plays, 90 yards, 4:13.**

**Fourth quarter**

- IND – Edgerrin James 2-yard run (Mike Vanderjagt kick), 9:54. Browns 28–26. **Drive: 11 plays, 77 yards, 5:17.**
- IND – Mike Vanderjagt 21-yard field goal, 0:04. Colts 29–28. **Drive: 11 plays, 54 yards, 4:08.**

**Top passers**

- IND – Peyton Manning – 27/43, 276 yards
- CLE – Ty Detmer – 15/26, 173 yards, TD

**Top rushers**

- IND – Edgerrin James – 28 rushes, 103 yards, 3 TD
- CLE – Karim Abdul-Jabbar – 19 rushes, 84 yards

**Top receivers**

- IND – Marvin Harrison – 14 receptions, 138 yards
- CLE – Irv Smith – 4 receptions, 48 yards

On a cold and windy afternoon, the 2–13 Browns hosted the 12–2 Colts, looking to end the season on a high note. The Browns led for most of the game and were up 28–19 at the beginning of the fourth, but were shutout in the final quarter as the Colts scored ten unanswered points to win 29–28.

=== Standings ===
AFC Central
	W	L	T	PCT	PF	PA	STK
^{(1)} Jacksonville Jaguars	14	2	0	.875	396	217	W1
^{(4)} Tennessee Titans	13	3	0	.813	392	324	W4
Baltimore Ravens	8	8	0	.500	324	277	L1
Pittsburgh Steelers	6	10	0	.375	317	320	L1
Cincinnati Bengals	4	12	0	.250	283	460	L2
Cleveland Browns	2	14	0	.125	217	437	L6
