= 2001 Cleveland Browns season =

53rd season in franchise history

- Owner: Al Lerner
- General manager: Dwight Clark
- Head coach: Butch Davis
- Offensive coordinator: Bruce Arians
- Defensive coordinator: Foge Fazio
- Home stadium: Cleveland Browns Stadium

Results
- Record: 7–9
- Division place: T–3rd AFC Central
- Playoffs: Did not qualify
- Pro Bowlers: LB Jamir Miller

The 2001 season was the Cleveland Browns' 53rd as a professional sports franchise, their 49th as a member of the National Football League, and the first season under head coach Butch Davis. The team improved on their 3-13 record from the previous season, but for the seventh straight year did not qualify for the postseason.

== Offseason ==
Additions	Subtractions
QB Kelly Holcomb (Colts)	QB Doug Pederson (Packers)
T/G Ross Verba (Packers)	T Everett Lindsay (Vikings)
G Tre' Johnson (Redskins)	FB Marc Edwards (Patriots)
TE Rickey Dudley (Raiders)	QB Ty Detmer (Lions)
LB Brant Boyer (Jaguars)	WR David Patten (Patriots)
S Devin Bush (Rams)	WR Darrin Chiaverini (Cowboys)
LB Dwayne Rudd (Vikings)	RB Travis Prentice (Vikings)
	QB Spergon Wynn (Vikings)

=== 2001 NFL draft ===
2001 Cleveland Browns draft
Round	Pick	Player	Position	College	Notes
1	3	Gerard Warren	Defensive tackle	Florida	
2	33	Quincy Morgan	Wide receiver	Kansas State	
3	65	James Jackson	Running back	Miami (FL)	
4	94	Anthony Henry	Cornerback	South Florida	
5	134	Jeremiah Pharms	Linebacker	Washington	
6	165	Michael Jameson	Cornerback	Texas A&M	
7	203	Paul Zukauskas	Guard	Boston College	
7	245	Andre King	Wide receiver	Miami (FL)	
Made roster

=== Undrafted free agents ===
2001 undrafted free agents of note
Player	Position	College
Cecil Caldwell	Defensive Lineman	South Carolina
Bo Carroll	Wide receiver	Florida
Brandon Davis	Safety	Arkansas
Carl Fair	Running back	UAB
Kerry Linear	Defensive end	Texas A&M–Kingsville
John Raveche	Tackle	Princeton
Doug Rosfeld	Center	Cincinnati

== Personnel ==
2001 Cleveland Browns staff
Front office: Owner and chairman – Alfred Lerner; President and chief executive officer – Carmen Policy; Executive vice president/director of football operations – Dwight Clark; Executive director of player personnel – Joe Collins; Director of college personnel – Phil Neri; Director of pro personnel – Keith Kidd; Head coaches: Head coach – Butch Davis; Offensive coaches: Offensive coordinator – Bruce Arians; Quarterbacks – Carl Smith; Running backs – Todd McNair; Wide receivers – Terry Robiskie; Tight ends – Steve Hagen; Offensive line – Larry Zierlein; Assistant offensive line – Mike Sullivan	Defensive coaches: Defensive coordinator – Foge Fazio; Defensive line – Ray Hamilton; Linebackers – Keith Butler; Secondary – Chuck Pagano; Defensive nickel package – Todd Bowles; Special teams coaches: Special teams coordinator – Jerry Rosburg; Strength and conditioning: Head strength and conditioning – Tim Jorgensen; Assistant strength and conditioning – Rob Phillips

== Roster ==
2001 Cleveland Browns roster
Quarterbacks (QB): 12 Josh Booty; 2 Tim Couch; 10 Kelly Holcomb; Running backs (RB): 42 Carl Fair; 34 Benjamin Gay KR; 30 Jamel White KR; Wide receivers (WR): 88 JaJuan Dawson; 85 Kevin Johnson PR; 84 Andre King KR; 81 Quincy Morgan KR; 86 Dennis Northcutt PR; Tight ends (TE): 48 Rod Monroe; 89 Jake Moreland; 47 Alvin Morrow; 87 O.J. Santiago	Offensive linemen (OL): 63 Brad Bedell G; 69 Roger Chanoine T; 71 Gaylon Hyder T; 66 Jeremy McKinney G; 61 Richard Mercier G; 72 Roman Oben T; 60 Shaun O'Hara C/G; 77 Ross Verba G/T; 64 Dave Wohlabaugh C; 62 Paul Zukauskas G/T; Defensive linemen (DL): 79 DeVone Claybrooks DT; 74 Felipe Claybrooks DE; 73 Derrick Ham DE; 70 Alvin McKinley DT; 78 Tyrone Rogers DE; 93 Mark Smith DT; 96 Greg Spires DE; 94 Gerard Warren DT	Linebackers (LB): 52 Brant Boyer MLB/OLB; 55 Anthony Denman OLB; 51 Lenoy Jones MLB; 95 Jamir Miller OLB; 58 Wali Rainer MLB; 57 Dwayne Rudd OLB; 54 Tarek Saleh OLB; Defensive backs (DB): 36 Chris Akins FS; 23 Devin Bush FS; 26 Dyshod Carter CB; 24 Corey Fuller CB; 37 Anthony Henry CB; 31 Raymond Jackson CB; 20 Earl Little SS; 33 Daylon McCutcheon CB; 38 Earthwind Moreland CB; 21 Marquis Smith SS; Special teams (ST): 4 Phil Dawson K; 17 Chris Gardocki P; 97 Ryan Kuehl LS	Practice squad: 18 Bobby Brown WR; 49 Chris Eitzmann TE; 68 Gannon Shepherd T; -- Terrence Sykes T; Reserve: 92 Courtney Brown DE (IR); 83 Mark Campbell TE (IR); 27 Lamar Chapman CB (IR); 82 Rickey Dudley TE (IR); -- Jammi German WR (IR); 29 James Jackson RB (IR); 22 Michael Jameson S (IR); 67 Tre' Johnson G (IR); -- Noel LaMontagne G (IR); 90 Keith McKenzie DE (IR); 98 Arnold Miller DE (IR); 99 Orpheus Roye DE/DT (IR); 25 Lewis Sanders CB (IR); 80 Aaron Shea TE (IR); 91 Marcus Spriggs DT (IR); -- Mike Thompson DT (IR); -- Mark Word DE (IR); Rookies in italics 53 active, 17 reserve, 4 practice squad

== Bottlegate incident ==
The most notable game from the 2001 Cleveland Browns season came on a December 16 game against the Jacksonville Jaguars in what became known as "Bottlegate". The Browns were driving toward the east end zone for what would have been the winning score. A controversial call on fourth down gave the Jaguars the ball. Browns' receiver Quincy Morgan had caught a pass for a first down on 4th and 2. After Tim Couch spiked the ball on the next play, referee Terry McAulay reviewed Morgan's catch, claiming that the replay officials had buzzed him before Couch spiked the ball. (NFL Rules state that once the next play is started, the officials cannot under any circumstances review any previous plays.) Upon reviewing the play, McAulay determined that Morgan never had control of the ball, thus the pass was incomplete, and the Jaguars were awarded the ball. Fans in the Dawg Pound began throwing plastic beer bottles and other objects on the field. McAulay declared the game over and sent the teams to the locker rooms. NFL Commissioner Paul Tagliabue then called to override the referee's decision, sending the players back onto the field, where the Jaguars ran out the last seconds under a hail of debris.

After the game, McAulay clarified that they first reviewed whether or not the electronic pager had buzzed before Couch had spiked the ball. In a discussion with the Replay Official, Bill Reynolds, it was determined that Reynolds buzzed down before the spike. After the game was called, Tagliabue called NFL Supervisor Dick McKenzie and informed him that the game had to be finished to completion. Neither McAulay nor Reynolds suggested to Tagliabue that the game should be called, which was within the power of the Commissioner's Office. Davis would later comment that he was told that the buzzer went off at the same time as the snap. Couch had initially believed that the officials were going to penalize the Browns for intentional grounding for Couch faking a spike before spiking it, but was then told that the spike was legal. The referees then began discussing the play prior to the spike. President and Chief Executive Officer Carmen Policy refused to criticize the actions of the fans and the decisions of the officiating crew. The following season from there on plastic beer bottles became banned from Cleveland Browns Stadium.

== Schedule ==
Week	Date	Opponent	Result	Record	Venue	Attendance	Recap
1	September 9	Seattle Seahawks	**L** 6–9	0–1	Cleveland Browns Stadium	72,318	Recap
2 (Note: The Browns were originally scheduled to play the Pittsburgh Steelers during Week 2 of the original NFL schedule (September 16) at Heinz Field in Pittsburgh. However, due to the September 11 attacks, the game was rescheduled to Week 17.)	September 23	Detroit Lions	**W** 24–14	1–1	Cleveland Browns Stadium	73,168	Recap
3	September 30	at **Jacksonville Jaguars**	**W** 23–14	2–1	Alltel Stadium	57,875	Recap
4	October 7	San Diego Chargers	**W** 20–16	3–1	Cleveland Browns Stadium	73,018	Recap
5	October 14	at **Cincinnati Bengals**	**L** 14–24	3–2	Paul Brown Stadium	64,217	Recap
6	October 21	**Baltimore Ravens**	**W** 24–14	4–2	Cleveland Browns Stadium	72,818	Recap
7	Bye						
8	November 4	at Chicago Bears	**L** 21–27 (OT)	4–3	Soldier Field	66,944	Recap
9	November 11	**Pittsburgh Steelers**	**L** 12–15 (OT)	4–4	Cleveland Browns Stadium	73,218	Recap
10	November 18	at **Baltimore Ravens**	**W** 27–17	5–4	PSINet Stadium	69,353	Recap
11	November 25	**Cincinnati Bengals**	**W** 18–0	6–4	Cleveland Browns Stadium	72,918	Recap
12	December 2	**Tennessee Titans**	**L** 15–31	6–5	Cleveland Browns Stadium	72,818	Recap
13	December 9	at New England Patriots	**L** 16–27	6–6	Foxboro Stadium	60,292	Recap
14	December 16	**Jacksonville Jaguars**	**L** 10–15	6–7	Cleveland Browns Stadium	72,818	Recap
15	December 23	at Green Bay Packers	**L** 7–30	6–8	Lambeau Field	59,824	Recap
16	December 30	at **Tennessee Titans**	**W** 41–38	7–8	Adelphia Coliseum	68,798	Recap
17	January 6	at **Pittsburgh Steelers**	**L** 7–28	7–9	Heinz Field	59,189	Recap
Note: Intra-division opponents are in **bold** text.

=== Game summaries ===
==== Week 2: vs Detroit Lions ====
Week 2: Detroit Lions at Cleveland Browns – Game summary

Quarter	1	2	3	4	Total
Lions	0	0	7	7	**14**
**Browns**	7	7	10	0	**24**

at Cleveland Browns Stadium, Cleveland, Ohio

- Date: September 23
- Game time: 1:00 p.m. EDT
- Game weather: 73 °F (23 °C)
- Game attendance: 73,168
- Referee: Terry McAulay
- TV announcers (Fox): Kenny Albert, Tim Green
- Box score

Game information

**First quarter**

- CLE – Kevin Johnson 4-yard pass from Tim Couch (Phil Dawson kick), 8:55. Browns 7–0. **Drive: 7 plays, 57 yards, 2:50.**

**Second quarter**

- CLE – Shaun O'Hara 2-yard pass from Tim Couch (Phil Dawson kick), 13:21. Browns 14–0. **Drive: 6 plays, 53 yards, 3:36.**

**Third quarter**

- CLE – Phil Dawson 33-yard field goal, 11:36. Browns 17–0. **Drive: 4 plays, 2 yards, 0:49.**
- DET – Terry Fair 26-yard interception return (Jason Hanson kick), 7:26. Browns 17–7.
- CLE – Quincy Morgan 34-yard pass from Tim Couch (Phil Dawson kick), 4:25. Browns 24–7. **Drive: 1 play, 34 yards, 0:07.**

**Fourth quarter**

- DET – Johnnie Morton 14-yard pass from Ty Detmer (Jason Hanson kick), 11:25. Browns 24–14. **Drive: 9 plays, 84 yards, 4:13.**

**Top passers**

- DET – Ty Detmer – 22/42, 212 yards, TD, 7 INT
- CLE – Tim Couch – 12/20, 138 yards, 3 TD, 2 INT

**Top rushers**

- DET – James Stewart – 17 rushes, 71 yards
- CLE – James Jackson – 31 rushes, 124 yards

**Top receivers**

- DET – Johnnie Morton – 6 receptions, 100 yards, TD
- CLE – Quincy Morgan – 2 receptions, 38 yards, TD

==== Week 5: at Cincinnati Bengals ====
Week 5: Cleveland Browns at Cincinnati Bengals – Game summary

Quarter	1	2	3	4	Total
Browns	7	0	0	7	**14**
**Bengals**	3	0	10	11	**24**

at Paul Brown Stadium, Cincinnati, Ohio

- Date: October 14
- Game time: 1:00 p.m. EDT
- Game weather: Cloudy, 57 °F (14 °C)
- Game attendance: 64,217
- Referee: Mike Carey
- TV announcers (CBS): Don Criqui, Steve Tasker
- Box score

==== Week 8: at Chicago Bears ====
Week 8: Cleveland Browns at Chicago Bears

Quarter	1	2	3	4	OT	Total
Browns	7	0	14	0	0	**21**
**Bears**	0	7	0	14	6	**27**

at Soldier Field, Chicago, Illinois

- Date: November 4, 2001
- Game time: 4:15 p.m. EST/3:15 p.m. CST
- Game weather: Overcast, 54 °F (12 °C)
- Game attendance: 66,944
- TV announcers (CBS): Greg Gumbel, Phil Simms, Armen Keteyian

Game information

**First quarter**

**Second quarter**

**Third quarter**

**Fourth quarter**

Top passers

- CLE – Tim Couch – 14/23, 211 yards, 2 TD, INT
- CHI – Shane Matthews – 30/50, 357 yards, 2 TD, 3 INT

Top rushers

- CLE – James Jackson – 22 rushes, 71 yards
- CHI – Anthony Thomas – 31 rushes, 96 yards, TD

Top receivers

- CLE – Kevin Johnson – 5 receptions, 99 yards, TD
- CHI – Dez White – 7 receptions, 92 yards

==== Week 9: vs. Pittsburgh Steelers ====
Week 9: Pittsburgh Steelers at Cleveland Browns – Game summary

Quarter	1	2	3	4	OT	Total
**Steelers**	3	3	3	3	3	**15**
Browns	9	0	3	0	0	**12**

at Cleveland Browns Stadium, Cleveland, Ohio

- Date: November 11
- Game time: 1:00 p.m. EST
- Game weather: 42 °F (6 °C)
- Game attendance: 73,218
- Referee: Dick Hantak
- TV announcers (CBS): Ian Eagle, Solomon Wilcots
- Box score

Game information

**First quarter**

**Second quarter**

**Third quarter**

**Fourth quarter**

**Top passers**

- PIT - Kordell Stewart - 18/32, 188 yards
- CLE - Tim Couch - 18/33, 160 yards, TD

**Top rushers**

- PIT - Jerome Bettis - 29 rushes, 163 yards
- CLE - James Jackson - 18 rushes, 57 yards

**Top receivers**

- PIT - Amos Zereoue - 3 receptions, 77 yards
- CLE - Kevin Johnson - 8 receptions, 62 yards

==== Week 15: at Green Bay Packers ====
Week 15: Cleveland Browns at Green Bay Packers

Quarter	1	2	3	4	Total
Browns	0	7	0	0	**7**
**Packers**	13	10	0	7	**30**

at Lambeau Field, Green Bay, Wisconsin

- Date: December 23, 2001
- Game time: 4:15 p.m. EST/3:15 p.m. CST
- Game weather: Snow Overcast, 24 °F (−4 °C)
- Game attendance: 59,824
- TV announcers (CBS): Dick Enberg, Dan Dierdorf, Bonnie Bernstein

Game information

**First quarter**

**Second quarter**

**Third quarter**

**Fourth quarter**

Top passers

- CLE – Tim Couch – 22/33, 203 yards, TD, 3 INT
- GB – Brett Favre – 18/28, 139 yards, 3 TD

Top rushers

- CLE – Jamel White – 21 rushes, 131 yards
- GB – Anthony Thomas – 31 rushes, 96 yards, TD

Top receivers

- CLE – Jamel White – 9 receptions, 85 yards, TD
- GB – Bubba Franks – 4 receptions, 29 yards, 2 TD

== Standings ==
AFC Central
	W	L	T	PCT	PF	PA	STK
^{(1)} Pittsburgh Steelers	13	3	0	.813	352	212	W1
^{(5)} Baltimore Ravens	10	6	0	.625	303	265	W1
Cleveland Browns	7	9	0	.438	285	319	L1
Tennessee Titans	7	9	0	.438	336	388	L2
Jacksonville Jaguars	6	10	0	.375	294	286	L2
Cincinnati Bengals	6	10	0	.375	226	309	W2

== Awards and records ==
=== Milestones ===
2001 was the first of two seasons since the Browns were reactivated in 1999 in which the same quarterback (Tim Couch) started all 16 games. The second was (Baker Mayfield) in 2019.

Rookie Cornerback Anthony Henry had 10 interceptions including one ran back 97 yards for a touchdown.
