= Phil Dawson =

American football player (born 1975)

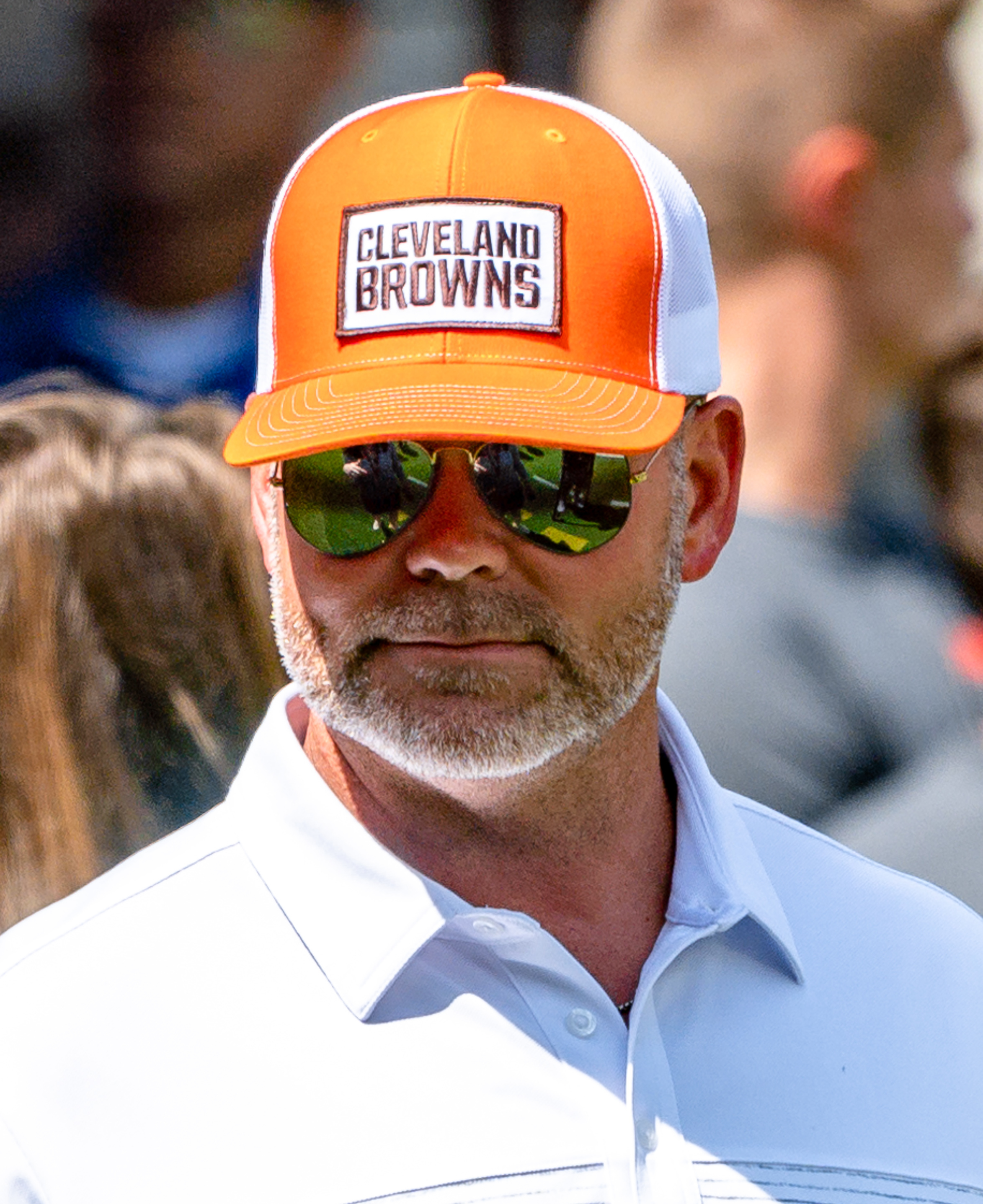
- Dawson in 2019

No. 4, 9
- Position: Placekicker

Personal information
- Born: January 23, 1975 (age 51); West Palm Beach, Florida, U.S.
- Listed height: 5 ft 11 in (1.80 m)
- Listed weight: 200 lb (91 kg)

Career information
- High school: Lake Highlands (Dallas, Texas)
- College: Texas (1993–1997)
- NFL draft: 1998: undrafted

Career history
- Oakland Raiders (1998)*; New England Patriots (1998)*; Cleveland Browns (1999–2012); San Francisco 49ers (2013–2016); Arizona Cardinals (2017–2018)
- * Offseason or practice squad member only

Awards and highlights
- 2× Second-team All-Pro (2007, 2012); Pro Bowl (2012); 2nd Team All-American (NEA-1996); First-team All-Big 12 (1996); First-team All-SWC (1994); 1996 Big 12 Champion; Southwest Conference Champion (1994, 1995); 1994 Sun Bowl Champion

Career NFL statistics
- Field goals made: 441
- Field goal attempts: 526
- Field goal %: 83.8
- Longest field goal: 57
- Touchbacks: 227
- Stats at Pro Football Reference

Philip Drury Dawson (born January 23, 1975) is an American former professional football player who was a placekicker in the National Football League (NFL) for 20 years. Before that he was an All-American college football player for the Texas Longhorns. He signed with the Oakland Raiders as an undrafted free agent in 1998 and spent a season on the Patriots practice squad. He played most of his career with the Cleveland Browns from 1999 to 2012 where he was a Pro Bowler, and has the record for most field goals made for the franchise, passing Hall of Famer Lou Groza in 2010. He also played for the San Francisco 49ers and Arizona Cardinals.

== Early life ==
Dawson was born in West Palm Beach, Florida, but later moved to Dallas, Texas.

He started kicking in middle school when he was one of few players with soccer experience. He attended Lake Highlands High School in Dallas, Texas from 1989 to 1993 and was a letterman in football. As a senior, Dawson was a starter at both kicker and offensive tackle until hurting his knee in a preseason scrimmage. Dawson thought that he might have had to have season-ending surgery, but he gutted it out, stuck to kicking, and was named as an All-American and the Southwest Region Offensive Player of the Year by SuperPrep. In a 1992 playoff game at Texas Stadium against Nacogdoches High School, he kicked a 52-yard field goal as time expired to beat Nacogdoches 31–28 and Lake Highlands went as far as the Regional quarterfinals where they lost to Temple.

== College career ==
Dawson attended the University of Texas at Austin, where he was a four-year letterman in football from 1994 to 1997 and earned a B.A. in political science.

After redshirting his freshman year, Dawson scored 80 points and went a perfect 38 for 38 on extra points, the 2nd most in a single season without missing in school history at the time, in the 1994 season. He continued his streak into his sophomore year and tied a school record with 54 consecutive extra points made. He also had 14 consecutive made field goals, the 2nd most for a freshman in school history. Early in the season, he kicked his first of 9 career 50+ yard field goals with a 50 yarder against Pittsburgh. He was named first team All-Southwest Conference, led the conference in field goal accuracy and helped the Longhorns win a share of the Southwest Conference Championship and then win the 1994 Sun Bowl. He set the freshman school record for points scored in a season (80) and finished 3rd for accuracy (73.7%) by a freshman.

Going into the 1995 season, he was named to the Playboy Magazine Preseason All-American team. As a sophomore, Dawson led the Longhorns in scoring, helping them to win the Southwest Conference Championship outright and go to the Sugar Bowl. In the Sugar Bowl, he kicked a notable game-winning field goal against the University of Virginia, booting a 50-yarder against a 30-MPH wind to give Texas a dramatic 17–16 victory as time expired. It was the 2nd longest field goal in a bowl game in school history and the team's first ever walk-off field goal victory. That season he led the Southwest Conference in extra points attempts and extra points made. Though he only played in the Southwest Conference for two years, he is 19th all time for extra point attempts and 17th for extra points made.

In the offseason, he had a knee operation.

In his junior year, Dawson scored 108 points, the second most in a season, and the most ever by a placekicker, in school history at the time. Against Oklahoma State, he scored 17 points setting a school record that would last until 2023. He made first team All-Big 12 and he helped Texas win the first Big 12 Championship game, make a trip to the Fiesta Bowl and finish ranked 23rd. He led the Big 12 in field goals and kick scoring per game (9 ppg). He led the team in scoring for the 3rd consecutive year and at the Fiesta Bowl he tied the school record for field goals in a bowl game (3). He was named a 2nd Team All-American by the Newspaper Enterprise Association and a Lou Groza Award semi-finalist. He led the Big 12 in extra point and field goal attempts; in extra points and field goals made adn in kicking points.

In 1997, his senior year, he was a team captain but suffered a series of injuries to his hamstring, pelvis, groin and hip. Against Rutgers he kicked a college career long 54 yard field goal, one of two 50-yard or longer field goals he had that day and part of a streak of six straight 50-yard+ field goals without a miss - a school record at the time. At the end of the season he was named second-team All-Big 12 and first-team Academic All-Big 12.

After his final year at Texas, he played in the 1998 Senior Bowl.

He finished his time at Texas holding 13 school records, including career scoring, with 339 career points, a record that would be broken by Ricky Williams five games into the next season. It wouldn't be topped by another place kicker until 2004. He also held the record for career field goal attempts (79), field goals made (59), consecutive field goals made (15) and field goal accuracy (74.7%) and most of the records would last over 20 years. He was also 2nd for 50+ yard field goals made (9). He finished his college career ranked 16th on the NCAA all-time scoring list. He was also 12th in kick scoring and 31st in FGMs.

In 2012 he was entered into the Longhorn Hall of Honor.

== Professional career ==
=== Oakland Raiders ===
Though considered a potential late round pick, Dawson went undrafted in the 1998 NFL draft. He was signed as an undrafted free agent by the Oakland Raiders five days after the draft and waived by them after their second preseason game in August. He logged a missed 47-yard field goal attempt and a made extra point for the Raiders (both occurring against the Dallas Cowboys).

=== New England Patriots ===
He was picked up by the New England Patriots, to fill in for an injured Adam Vinatieri, two days after being cut by the Raiders. A few days later he kicked the winning field goal in a preseason game against the Redskins. He played for them in their final preseason game kicking a 27-yard FG and 3 extra points and was then waived the next day. He was immediately signed to the practice squad, out of concern for Vinatieri's health, but never appeared in a game for them.

=== Cleveland Browns ===
==== 1999 season ====
The Cleveland Browns signed Dawson as a free agent in March 1999, and he remained with the team for 14 years until he joined the San Francisco 49ers in 2013. It's tied for the 2nd longest consecutive tenure in Browns history.

He scored the first points in the history of the "new" Cleveland Browns in 1999. On October 10 of that year, he scored the only touchdown of his career on a fake field goal against the Bengals in an 18–17 loss that was also the first rushing touchdown scored by a Brown at Cleveland Browns Stadium. That season he also kicked the first of his walk-off game winning field goals against Pittsburgh to win the game 16-15.

==== 2000 season ====
In the 2000 season, Dawson kicked a game winning field goal against Pittsburgh to give the Browns their first home win at the new Browns Stadium and their first at home in 5 years.

==== 2003 season ====
During the 2003 season Dawson broke Matt Stover's franchise record for most consecutive FGs made (27). In Week 14 he broke his arm making a tackle and still finished the game, but missed the last 3 games of the season. He returned to make his first trip to the playoffs, and only one as a Brown. The Browns lost to the Steelers 36-33 in a game where they were setting up Dawson for a game tying FG, but ran out of time.

==== 2004 season ====
By the 2004 season, Dawson had kicked at least 6 game-winning field goals over his career.

==== 2005 season ====
In 2005, against the Houston Texans, Dawson tied the team record for most field goals in a game with 5. In 2005, he also broker Stover's franchise record for field goal percentage in a season (93.1%).

==== 2006 season ====
In 2006 Dawson broke the team record of most field goals made with 6 against the San Diego Chargers. He was also awarded Ed Block Courage Award winner by his teammates and won the Doug Dieken Humanitarian Award for his charitable and community efforts.

==== 2007 season ====
In the 2007 season, against the Oakland Raiders, Dawson had a potential game-winning field goal blocked; but two months later against the Baltimore Ravens, he kicked a 51-yard field goal, that hit both the upright and the stanchion and was originally ruled "no good", to take the Browns to overtime before also hitting the 33-yard game winner. Prior to the 2008 season, the rule was changed to allow field goal and extra point attempts that hit the uprights or crossbar to be reviewed. The new rule would end up being called the "Phil Dawson Rule." Notably, later in the season on December 16, in the snow and wind gusts up to 40 mph, Dawson kicked another field goal, a 49-yard field goal, that hit the crossbar. This field goal helped the Browns secure an 8–0 victory over the Buffalo Bills in blizzard-like conditions. He finished 8th for extra point attempts, 9th for extra points made and 10th in scoring in the NFL and was named 2nd team All-Pro by the AP. His 120 points was the 2nd most ever by a Brown at that point. It was his 4th season with 100 points or more and set the Browns record. That season he was elected the Dino Lucarelli "Good Guy" Award honoree by the Pro Football Writers of America (PFWA).

==== 2008 season ====
On November 17, 2008, he hit a 56-yard game-winning field goal, one of five for the night, against the Buffalo Bills on Monday Night Football, the longest of his career at that point and the 4th longest in Browns history. That season he set the Browns record for most field goals in a season with 30 and for most consecutive games with a field goal (15).

==== 2009 season ====
In 2009, against the Detroit Lions, Dawson threw his one and only career pass, a 10-yard strike to Mike Furrey on a fake field goal attempt that earned the team a first down. Despite kicking right-footed, he throws left-handed.

==== 2010 season ====
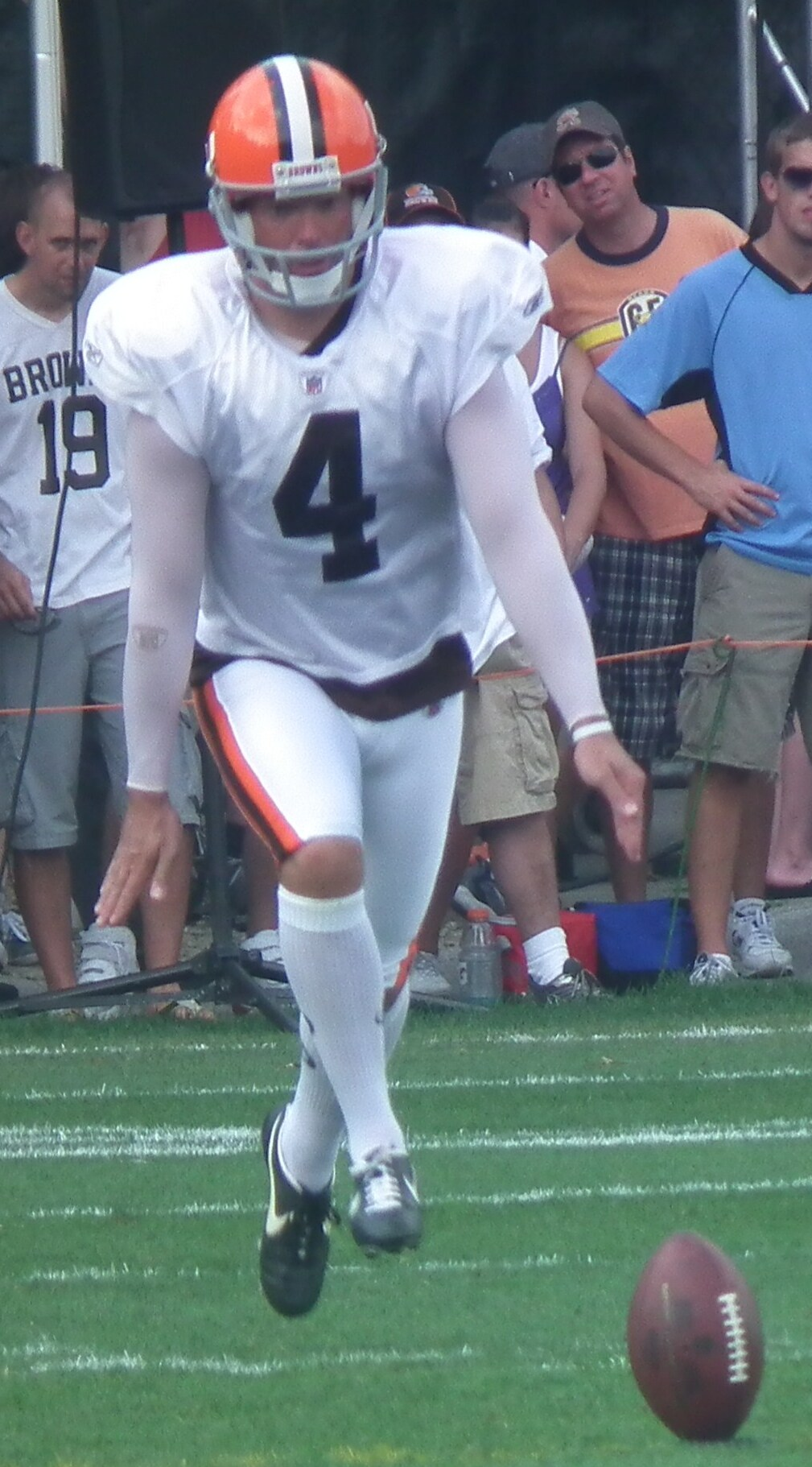
Dawson kicking off in a preseason game, 2010

On October 10, 2010, Dawson tied Lou Groza for the Browns' career field-goal record with 234, and then broke it the next week.

Dawson would have become an unrestricted free agent at the end of the 2010 season, but the Browns placed the franchise tag on him on July 20th, 2011 instead, keeping him for the 2011 season.

==== 2011 season ====
During the 2011 season, Dawson broke his own franchise records for most consecutive games with a field goal (23) and most consecutive field goals made (29). He was given the franchise tag again in March 2012.

==== 2012 season ====
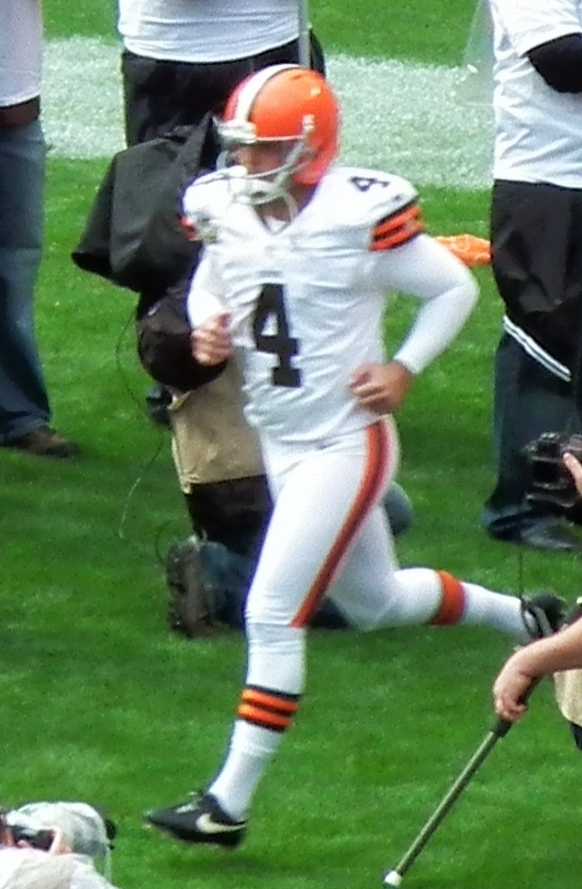
Dawson leading the Browns onto the field, 2012

In the 2012 season, Dawson broke his own franchise record for field goal percentage in a season (93.5%) and made the Pro Bowl. He was named 2nd team All-Pro by the AP again and 1st team All-Pro by the Sporting News and the Pro-Football Writers. He was also elected the Browns Player of the Year by the local PFWA chapter.

Going into the 2013 season, the Browns chose not to make him a franchise player again as it would have cost them $14 million and so he became a free agent.

When he left the Browns to play for the 49ers in 2013, he was the only player left from the "original" 1999 Browns squad.

Dawson holds the Browns record for most field goals (305), most field goals in a game (6), most consecutive field goals made (29), most consecutive games with a field goal (23), highest field goal percentage (84%) and highest field goal percentage in a season (93.5%). He finished his career with the Browns with the 2nd most points in Browns history and 3rd for both career games as a Brown and for PATs by a Brown.

In 2024, Dawson was named a Browns Legend and honored at halftime in week 3 of the 2024 NFL season.

=== San Francisco 49ers ===
The San Francisco 49ers signed Dawson to replace David Akers on March 19, 2013, for $2.25 million.

==== 2013 season ====
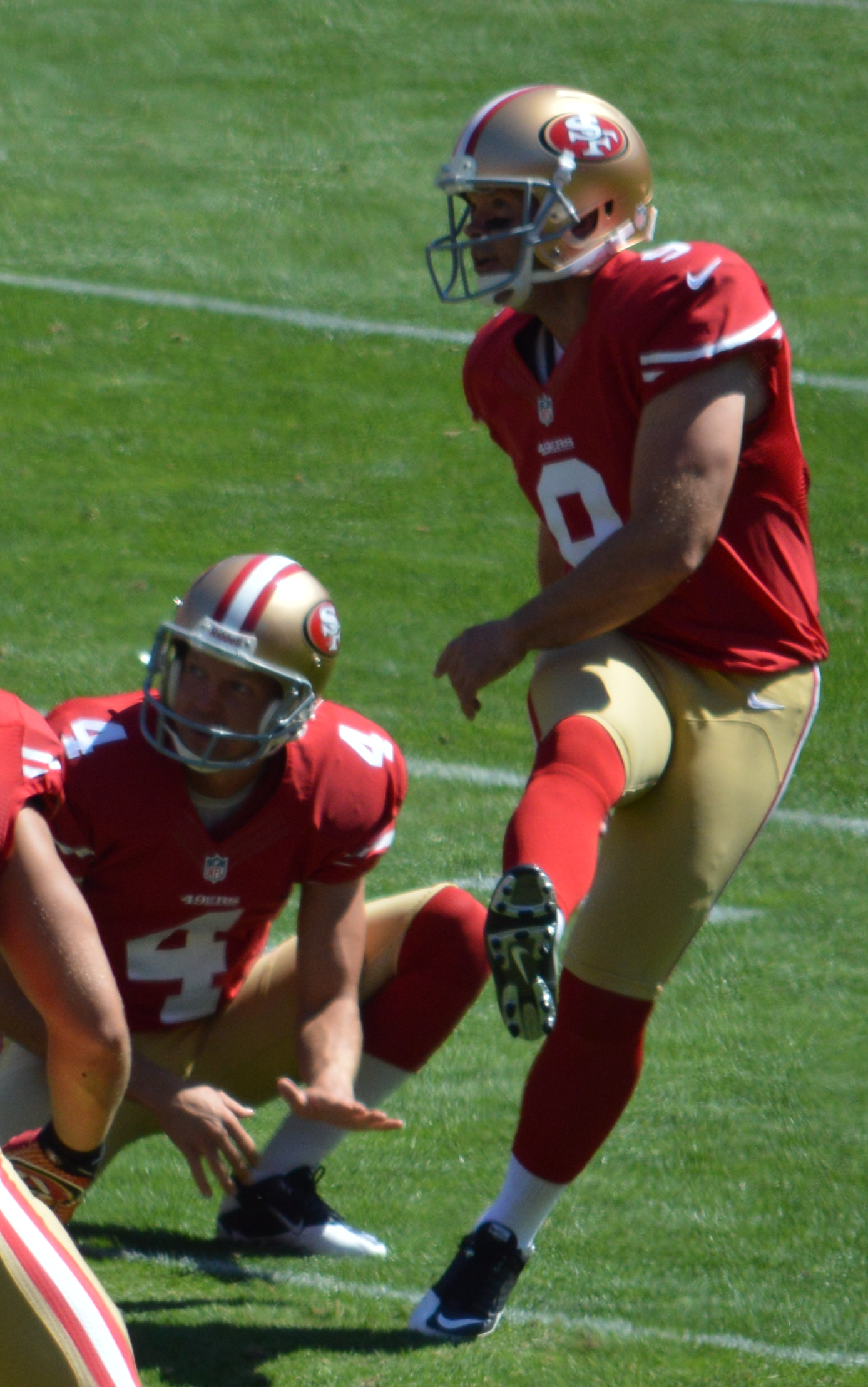
Dawson (right) kicking a field goal against the Green Bay Packers, 2013

In the 2013 season, Dawson went 32 for 36 on field goals and 42 of 42 for extra points playing for the 49ers on what would be the most successful team of his career. He made 27 consecutive field goals, a franchise record at the time, until the streak was snapped by a 24-yard field goal miss against the Arizona Cardinals in Week 17 - a game in which he later kicked a then career-long 56 yarder (the 2nd longest in franchise history at the time) and a 40 yard game-winner. On September 26, 2013, Dawson attempted and missed a 71-yard fair catch kick in the last seconds of the second quarter of a game against the St. Louis Rams; the third longest field-goal attempt in NFL history. Dawson finished his first year in San Francisco with the second-most points (140) and field goals (32-of-36) in a season in the team's history. his points scored, FGs made and XPs made (44) were all career highs. Dawson kicked the game-winning field goal in the 49ers Wild Card playoff game against the Green Bay Packers on January 5, 2014, giving the 49ers a 23–20 road victory and him his first career playoff win. The 49ers went all the way to the NFC Championship game which they lost by 6 points to the Seattle Seahawks in the last 30 seconds of the game.

==== 2014 season ====
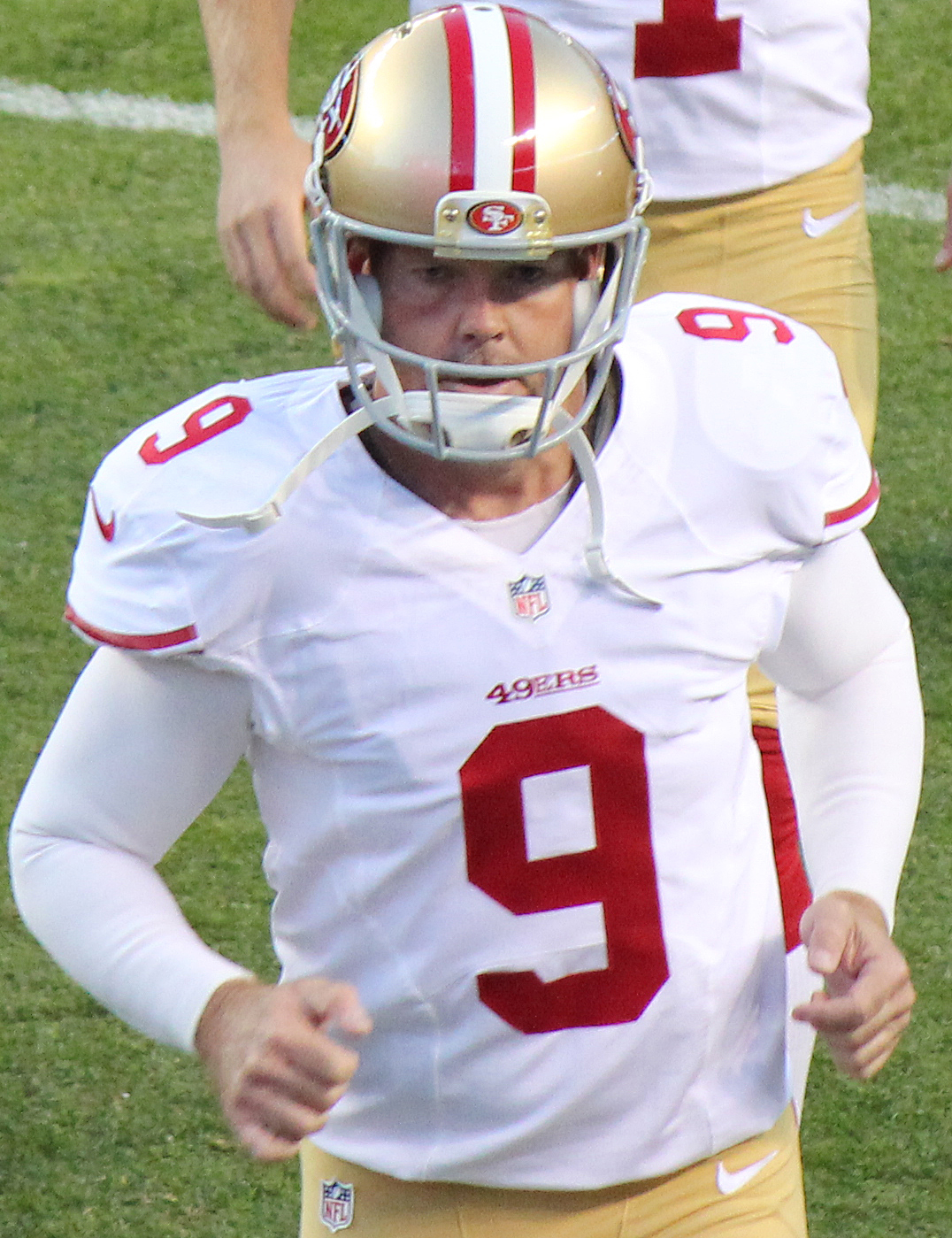
Dawson in 2014

On March 11, 2014, Dawson signed a new two-year contract to remain with the 49ers. Against New Orleans that season he kicked a field goal to get the 49ers into overtime and the game winner.

==== 2015 season ====
In 2015, handed kickoff duties to Bradley Pinion, but returned to kick-offs the next season.Against the Rams he had to replace Pinion as the team punter, a role he filled several times over the years (over his career he had 9 punts for 257 yards) after Pinion tweaked a calf. A few weeks later in Cleveland he was recognized with a video tribute during the game and a standing ovation. That season he made 19 FGs in a row, the 2nd most in franchise history at the time behind only his 2013 streak.

==== 2016 season ====
Dawson re-signed with the 49ers on a one-year contract on March 12, 2016. He made his 400th career field goal, making him the 10th player to hit that milestone all-time, on November 20, 2016, against the Patriots.

Dawson finished his time in San Francisco as the 49ers career leader in field goals over 50 yards (14); 2nd for points (140) and FGs made (32) in a single season; 2nd for field goal accuracy (86.1%); tied for 3rd for FGAs in a season (36); tied for 5th for FGMs (99); 7th for FGAs, PAT attempts and PATs made; and 10th in career scoring (427).

=== Arizona Cardinals ===
After the end of the 2016 season, Dawson became a free agent and went looking for a team closer to his home in Austin which landed him in Phoenix. On March 10, 2017, Dawson signed a two-year contract with the Arizona Cardinals.

==== 2017 season ====
On September 10, 2017, in the season opening 35–23 loss to the Detroit Lions, Dawson made his debut as a Cardinal, converting two extra points and a field goal in the loss. In the next game, Dawson converted three field goals, including a 40-yarder to force overtime and a 30-yarder in overtime to win, in the 16–13 victory over the Indianapolis Colts.

On November 26, 2017, Dawson hit a 57-yard field goal with one second left to beat the favored Jacksonville Jaguars. It was the longest made field goal of Dawson's career (although he made a 59-yard field goal during a 2010 preseason game with the Browns). He converted four field goals in the game, including the 57-yard game-winner, earning him NFC Special Teams Player of the Week.

==== 2018 season ====
On October 5, 2018, against the 49ers, Dawson became the 11th player in NFL history to appear in 300 career games.

In November, Dawson suffered a hip injury and was inactive for the November 18th game against Oakland. He returned for what would be his last NFL game, the November 25th game against the Chargers, but he missed a 46 yard field goal and the next day he was placed on the injured reserve list.

He became a free agent at the end of the season and was open to continuing to play, but no team signed him during the 2019 offseason.

=== Retirement ===
On August 1, 2019, Dawson announced his retirement after 21 seasons after signing a one-day ceremonial contract with the Browns to retire as a member of the team. After Dawson's retirement, Adam Vinatieri became the sole remaining active player from the 1990s.

He finished his career having played 305 games (7th all-time at the time), kicking 441 field goals (8th all time at the time) on 526 FGAs (12th all-time at the time) for an 83.8% field goal average (22nd all-time at the time) and 518 PATs made on 537 attempts (27th all time at the time for both) for a total of 1,847 points scored (11th all-time at the time).

== NFL career statistics ==
Legend
**Bold**	Career high

=== Regular season ===
Year	Team	GP	Field goals				Extra points			Points
Year	Team	GP	FGA	FGM	Lng	Pct	XPA	XPM	Pct	Points
1999	CLE	15	12	8	49	66.7	24	23	95.8	53
2000	CLE	**16**	17	14	45	82.4	17	17	**100.0**	59
2001	CLE	**16**	25	22	48	88.0	30	29	96.7	95
2002	CLE	**16**	28	22	52	78.6	35	34	97.1	100
2003	CLE	**13**	21	18	52	85.7	21	20	95.2	74
2004	CLE	**16**	29	24	50	82.8	28	28	**100.0**	100
2005	CLE	**16**	29	27	44	93.1	21	19	90.5	100
2006	CLE	**16**	29	21	51	72.4	25	25	**100.0**	88
2007	CLE	**16**	30	26	51	86.7	43	42	97.7	120
2008	CLE	**16**	36	30	56	83.3	18	18	**100.0**	108
2009	CLE	11	19	17	49	89.5	19	18	94.7	69
2010	CLE	**16**	28	23	48	82.1	28	28	**100.0**	97
2011	CLE	**16**	29	24	54	82.8	20	20	**100.0**	92
2012	CLE	**16**	31	29	53	**93.5**	29	29	**100.0**	116
2013	SF	**16**	36	**32**	56	88.9	**44**	**44**	**100.0**	**140**
2014	SF	**16**	31	25	55	80.6	33	33	**100.0**	108
2015	SF	**16**	27	24	54	88.9	21	20	95.2	92
2016	SF	**16**	21	18	53	85.7	34	33	97.1	87
2017	ARI	**16**	**40**	**32**	**57**	80.0	26	23	88.5	119
2018	ARI	10	8	5	43	62.5	15	15	**100.0**	30
Career		305	526	441	57	83.8	531	518	97.6	1,847

=== Postseason ===
Year	Team	GP	Field goals				Extra points			Points
Year	Team	GP	FGA	FGM	Lng	Pct	XPA	XPM	Pct	Points
2002	CLE	1	2	2	31	**100.0**	3	3	**100.0**	9
2013	SF	**3**	**7**	**7**	**49**	**100.0**	**6**	**6**	**100.0**	**27**
Career		4	9	9	49	100.0	9	9	100.0	36

== Personal life ==
After retiring from football, Dawson became a high school football coach. He was the special teams coordinator at Lipscomb Academy High School in Nashville, TN from 2020 to 2021. He was then hired as the head coach and athletic director at Hyde Park High School in Austin. He led the Panthers to an 8-3 record in 2022 and a berth in the playoffs after they had gone winless the year before he arrived. After 3 years, he left with a 19-13 record having taken them to the TAPPS Division II playoffs all three years, but never winning a playoff game. In March of 2025 he was hired as the head coach at Midland Christian. In his first season he led Midland Christian to an 8-4 record, 2nd place in their district and to the quarterfinals, after getting his first coaching playoff win, of the TAPPS Division II state playoffs.

His wife, Shannonis a singer-songwriter and produced her first album "Redemption" in 2013. Together they have three children: Dru, Beau, and Sophiann.

Dru was the starting quarterback at Vandegrift High School near Austin, and graduated in 2020. He spent the 2020 season on the roster as a QB at the University of Alabama at Birmingham but recorded no stats.

Beau graduated in 2022 from Lipscomb Academy. He spent two years on the roster as a tight end and deep snapper at Lamar University in Beaumont, but recorded no stats.
