= Tim Couch =

American football player (born 1977)

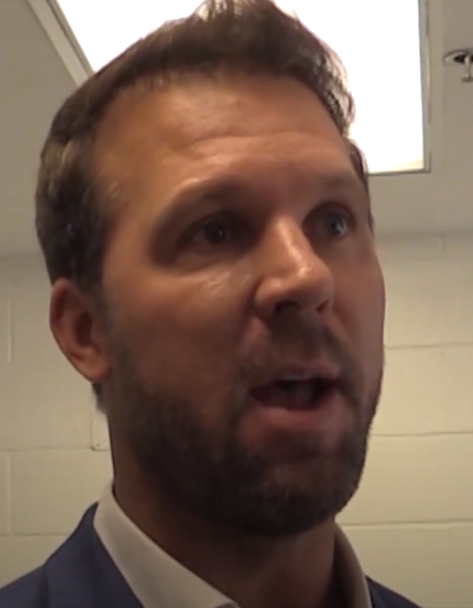
- Couch in 2018

No. 2
- Position: Quarterback

Personal information
- Born: July 31, 1977 (age 49); Hyden, Kentucky, U.S.
- Listed height: 6 ft 4 in (1.93 m)
- Listed weight: 220 lb (100 kg)

Career information
- High school: Leslie County (Hyden)
- College: Kentucky (1996–1998)
- NFL draft: 1999: 1st round, 1st overall pick

Career history
- Cleveland Browns (1999–2003); Green Bay Packers (2004)*; Jacksonville Jaguars (2007)*
- * Offseason or practice squad member only

Awards and highlights
- PFWA All-Rookie Team (1999); Quarterback of the Year (1998); Consensus All-American (1998); SEC Male Athlete of the Year (1999); SEC Player of the Year (1998); First-team All-SEC (1998); Second-team All-SEC (1997); NCAA passing yards leader (1997)

Career NFL statistics
- Passing attempts: 1,714
- Passing completions: 1,025
- Completion percentage: 59.8%
- TD–INT: 64–67
- Passing yards: 11,131
- Passer rating: 75.1
- Stats at Pro Football Reference
- College Football Hall of Fame

Timothy Scott Couch (born July 31, 1977) is an American former professional football quarterback who played in the National Football League (NFL) for five seasons with the Cleveland Browns. He played college football for the Kentucky Wildcats, winning Quarterback of the Year in 1998 after setting the Southeastern Conference record for single-season passing yards. Selected first overall by the Browns in the 1999 NFL draft, Couch was the franchise's first draft pick following their reactivation as an expansion team.

Couch threw for over 11,000 passing yards and helped the Browns qualify for the postseason in 2002, but his career would be cut short by injuries. Following attempted comebacks with the Green Bay Packers and Jacksonville Jaguars, he retired after failing to make the final roster for either team. Although Couch was unable to duplicate his college success, he was the first quarterback to lead the Browns to the playoffs since their NFL return and the only to do so between 2002 and 2019. He was inducted to the College Football Hall of Fame in 2024.

== Early life ==
Couch was born in Hyden, Kentucky. As a prep quarterback at Leslie County High School in Hyden, he set a number of national high school records: most pass completions (872), passing yardage (12,104), touchdown passes (132), and passing percentage for a season (75.1). After his senior season in 1995, he was the recipient of Kentucky's "Mr. Football" award. ESPN ranked Couch as the sixth-best high school athlete ever. Couch also starred on the Leslie County High School basketball varsity team. He scored 36 points per game as a junior, which was the highest average in the state. Couch finished his high school career with 3,023 points.

== College career ==
Couch attended the University of Kentucky, where he played for the Kentucky Wildcats football team from 1996 to 1998. During his 1996 freshman year under head coach Bill Curry, he split time as the starting quarterback with Billy Jack Haskins. Curry was fired after a 1–6 start that season, and replacement Hal Mumme announced early that Couch would be the starter in his new pass-oriented air raid offense. In 1997, Couch set several school records as the previously anemic Kentucky offense topped national offensive rankings and finished 5–6 on the season, including a win over #20 Alabama. During the 1998 season, Couch led Kentucky to seven wins (including a win on the road at #21 LSU) and a spot in the Outback Bowl (in which Couch completed 30 of 48 passes for 336 yards and two touchdowns, though Kentucky lost to Penn State 26–14). Following his junior season in 1998, Couch announced he would leave Kentucky to enter the NFL Draft early.

Couch's career totals at Kentucky included completing 795 of 1,184 passes (67.1% completion rate) for 8,435 yards (including 4,275 passing yards during the 1998 season alone) and 74 touchdowns (including a 97-yard touchdown pass to Craig Yeast against Florida on September 26, 1998). Couch still holds the NCAA record for completion percentage in one game (minimum of 40 completions) at 83.0% against Vanderbilt (44 of 53) in 1998 and for completions per game (36.4, 400 in 11 games) that same season. He also left Kentucky holding NCAA records for most completions in a season (400 in 1998), most completions in a two-year period (793 in 1997–1998), most completions per game in a two-year period (34.7, 1997–1998) and career completion percentage (67.1%). His 1998 record of 4,151 offensive yards in a season stood for nine years as a Southeastern Conference (SEC) record until Florida quarterback Tim Tebow broke it with 4,181 yards in 2007. His 1998 total of 4,275 passing yards was an SEC record, until broken by Joe Burrow of LSU.

== Professional career ==
Pre-draft measurables
Height	Weight	Arm length	Hand span	40-yard dash	10-yard split	20-yard split	20-yard shuttle	Vertical jump	Wonderlic
6 ft 4 1/8 in (1.93 m)	225 lb (102 kg)	31 in (0.79 m)	9 7/8 in (0.25 m)	5.08 s	1.73 s	2.85 s	4.34 s	31.0 in (0.79 m)	22
All values from NFL Combine

Couch's college success culminated in his selection as the number one overall selection in the NFL draft by the Cleveland Browns, who were returning to the NFL as an expansion team in 1999 following the original team's 1996 relocation to Baltimore. Couch took over for Ty Detmer as the team's starting quarterback in the second game of his rookie season. He spent five seasons as a starting quarterback for Cleveland, eventually facing competition from journeyman backup Kelly Holcomb during his final two seasons.

Couch's tenure in Cleveland ranged from leading the team to a playoff appearance, to boos and inconsistent play, which was partially a result of being constantly plagued by injuries. He managed only one 300-yard passing game in his professional career. He missed the final nine games of the 2000 season with a broken thumb. The high point of Couch's career came in 2002, when he threw for 2,842 yards and 18 touchdowns in leading the upstart Browns to a 9–7 record and a playoff appearance. However, he suffered a broken leg in the final game of the regular season and was forced to watch as Holcomb threw for over 400 yards in a loss to the Pittsburgh Steelers in the Wild Card round of the playoffs. This was the beginning of a quarterback controversy in Cleveland that would not be resolved until a year later when head coach Butch Davis tapped Holcomb as his starter. Couch's 2003 season often included playing behind an offensive line hampered by injury. He was released by the Browns on June 10, 2004, after the team was unable to find a trade partner. Couch is considered by Fox Sports to be one of the NFL's biggest draft busts in its history after being taken #1, immediately ahead of fellow quarterback Donovan McNabb, only to falter through most of his career. However, Couch's career has been defended by former Browns offensive coordinator Bruce Arians.

=== Notable moments and achievements ===
==== Hail Mary passes ====
Couch had several notable moments for the Browns, including two "Hail Mary" passes. In 1999 against the New Orleans Saints, his last-second touchdown pass to Kevin Johnson gave the Browns their first win. Three seasons later, in Jacksonville he tossed a game-winning pass on the last play of the game to Quincy Morgan. Couch holds the distinction of being the only quarterback in NFL history to throw two walk-off touchdown passes of 50 yards or more with 0:00 left on the clock.

==== 2002 season ====
Although the 2001 Browns had raised eyebrows with their defense, having recorded 43 sacks and a league-best 33 interceptions, the offense was once again moribund. The run game was pitiful and the offensive line was porous. At the start of the 2002 preseason, star linebacker Jamir Miller went down with a career-ending Achilles tendon injury. However, the team, led by Couch, won 9 games, including five in the final two minutes and seven by 10 points or less, and made a wildcard playoff spot. Those thrillers included a 31–28 overtime win over Tennessee in which Couch threw for 326 yards and 3 touchdowns, a last minute touchdown and two-point conversion passes from Couch to Dennis Northcutt against the Jets, the "Hail Mary" against the Jaguars, and a final-minute drive against Baltimore where Couch threw a 1-yard touchdown pass to tight end Mark Campbell after being pinned inside his own 5-yard line with 0 timeouts and 1:30 left in regulation.

==== Attempted comebacks ====
After the Browns released Couch in 2004, he signed as a free agent with the Green Bay Packers. Couch went on to have a disappointing training camp. Couch struggled with a rotator cuff injury, that would eventually require surgery, and was sidelined for the entire year.

Couch was released by the Packers during their final cutdown to 53 players prior to the season. Couch filed a grievance with the NFL Players Union against the Packers because they failed to attempt an injury settlement prior to his release.

After undergoing shoulder surgery in February 2005, Couch auditioned for the Chicago Bears midway through the 2005 season and the Cincinnati Bengals in December 2005. The Bears observed that his arm was not back to NFL shape during their workout and did not sign him. The Bengals did not pursue Couch, although Jon Kitna was not re-signed after his contract expired in early 2006.

Couch participated in tryouts with the Tennessee Titans in January 2006. He also had workouts with the Miami Dolphins, Pittsburgh Steelers, and the Houston Texans. All three teams stated that despite good workouts, they were not interested in pursuing him. Couch ended up missing the entire 2006 season due to another shoulder surgery.

ESPN reported on July 20, 2007, that Couch had contacted all 32 NFL teams to see if any teams were interested in him for the 2007–2008 season. On July 29, 2007, Couch agreed to a two-year contract with the Jacksonville Jaguars.

Couch was brought in to compete for the third-string quarterback position with Quinn Gray and Lester Ricard. He played in one preseason game against the Miami Dolphins and was 2-of-4 for 11 yards. On August 18, Couch failed to make the third string and was released. The next week, the Jaguars released former starter Byron Leftwich and Lester Ricard, leaving them without a third-string quarterback.

==== All-time Browns rankings ====
As of the end of the 2022 NFL season, Couch's career passing ranking among other Cleveland Browns quarterbacks with at least 700 pass attempts.

- Pass attempts - 6th
- Pass completions - 5th
- Completion percentage - 2nd
- Yardage - 6th
- Touchdowns - 9th
- Interceptions - 7th
- Wins - 9th

== Career statistics ==
Legend
	Led the league
**Bold**	Career high

=== NFL ===
Year	Team	Games			Passing								Rushing				Sacks		Fumbles (Note: Fumbles lost data taken from Pro Football Reference career game log)	
Year	Team	GP	GS	Record	Cmp	Att	Pct	Yds	Y/A	TD	Int	Rtg	Att	Yds	Avg	TD	Sck	SckY	Fum	Lost
1999	CLE	15	14	2–12	223	399	55.9	2,447	6.1	15	13	73.2	**40**	**267**	**6.7**	**1**	**56**	**359**	**14**	**5**
2000	CLE	7	7	2–5	137	215	**63.7**	1,483	**6.9**	7	9	77.3	12	45	3.8	0	10	78	2	0
2001	CLE	16	16	7–9	272	**454**	59.9	**3,040**	6.7	17	**21**	73.1	38	128	3.4	0	51	353	9	2
2002	CLE	14	14	**8–6**	**273**	443	61.6	2,842	6.4	**18**	18	76.8	23	77	3.3	0	30	213	6	1
2003	CLE	10	8	3–5	120	203	59.1	1,319	6.5	7	6	**77.6**	11	39	3.5	**1**	19	116	6	3
Career		62	59	22–37	1,025	1,714	59.8	11,131	6.5	64	67	75.1	124	556	4.5	2	166	1,119	37	11

=== College ===
Year	Team	Passing							Rushing		
Year	Team	Cmp	Att	Yds	Pct	TD	Int	Rtg	ATT	Yds	TD
1996	Kentucky	32	84	276	38.1	1	1	67.2	24	-26	0
1997	Kentucky	363	547	3,884	66.4	**37**	**19**	141.4	**66**	**-125**	**3**
1998	Kentucky	**400**	**553**	**4,275**	**72.3**	36	15	**153.3**	64	-124	1
Career		795	1,184	8,435	67.1	74	35	141.7	154	-275	4

== Awards and honors ==
NFL

- PFWA All-Rookie Team (1999)
- NFL Rookie of the Month (October 1999)
- AFC Offensive Player of the Week (9/22/02)

College

- Quarterback of the Year (1998)
- Consensus All-American (1998)
- SEC Male Athlete of the Year (1999)
- SEC Player of the Year (1998)
- First-team All-SEC (1998)
- Second-team All-SEC (1997)
- NCAA passing yards leader (1997)
- Heisman Trophy finalist (1998)

== Broadcasting career ==
In 2002, Couch played himself in an episode of The Jersey called "Cheers, Jeers and Tears" where cheerleading captain Hillary Lighter uses a magical jersey as she jumps into Couch's body to get advice/lessons from professional cheerleaders on new cheers, shocking his coach and fellow players.

Couch worked for Fox Sports South for five years as an analyst on the weekly show SEC Gridiron Live. He also served as the color analyst for the SEC Regional Network football package, typically found on Fox Sports Net affiliates in most SEC territories. Affiliates included Sun Sports, Fox Sports South, Fox Sports Southwest Plus, Fox Sports Houston, Fox Sports Midwest Plus, Fox Sports North Plus, and Fox Sports San Diego.

On April 11, 2018, the Browns announced that Couch would be calling their 2018 preseason games alongside Jay Crawford.

== Personal life ==
Couch was previously married to Playboy Playmate Heather Kozar.

Couch's son Chase graduated from high school in the spring of 2024. In January 2023, Chase received a verbal scholarship offer to play football at Kentucky. Chase now plays as a defensive lineman for the Holy Cross Crusaders football team.

Currently Couch and an older brother Greg are part owners of Meridian Wealth Management, a nationwide company based in Lexington.
