= Manuia Savea =

American football player (born 1975)

No. 64
- Position: Guard

Personal information
- Born: February 22, 1975 (age 51); Auto, American Samoa
- Listed height: 6 ft 2 in (1.88 m)
- Listed weight: 308 lb (140 kg)

Career information
- High school: Faga'itua (Fagaʻitua, American Samoa)
- College: Arizona (1996–1999)
- NFL draft: 2000: 7th round, 207th overall pick

Career history
- Cleveland Browns (2000)*; Chicago Enforcers (2001)
- * Offseason or practice squad member only

Career XFL statistics
- GP / GS: 3 / 0

Manuia Savea (born February 22, 1975) is a Samoan former professional football guard. He played college football at Arizona. He was selected in the seventh round of the 2000 NFL draft by the Cleveland Browns of the National Football League (NFL). He also played for the Chicago Enforcers of the XFL.

== Playing career ==
Savea was born in Auto, American Samoa and attended Faga'itua High School in Fagaʻitua before moving to the United States and attending the University of Arizona from 1996 to 1999, where he majored in sociology and played offensive and defensive line. In the spring of 1999, he had reconstructive knee surgery on his knee.

After college, Savea was drafted in the seventh round (207th overall) in the 2000 NFL draft by the Cleveland Browns. On July 11, 2000, he signed his four-year rookie contract. On August 22, 2000, he was released by the Browns. He was later selected in the XFL player draft by the Chicago Enforcers where he appeared in three games.

== Personal life ==
Savea has three children. While at Arizona, in October 1999, he was charged with three crimes domestic assault, domestic violence damage and contributing to the delinquency and dependency of a minor. After allegedly pushing his wife, which prompted her to lock herself in a bathroom. The charge of contributing to the delinquency and dependency of a minor was due to their children (all under the age of 5 at the time) being present.

Savea is currently an offensive and defensive line coach with Football University, in the Kansas City area and is part of the FBU Team Kansas City National Championship Team Coaching Staff.
