= Ronnie Powell (American football) =

American football player (born 1974)

No. 80
- Position: Wide receiver

Personal information
- Born: November 3, 1974 (age 52); Hope, Arkansas, U.S.
- Listed height: 5 ft 10 in (1.78 m)
- Listed weight: 174 lb (79 kg)

Career information
- High school: Hope
- College: Northwestern State
- NFL draft: 1999: undrafted

Career history
- Cleveland Browns (1999)
- Stats at Pro Football Reference

Ronnie Powell (born November 3, 1974) is an American former professional football player who was a wide receiver for the Cleveland Browns of the National Football League (NFL). He played college football for the Northwestern State Demons. Powell also competed for the Northwestern State Demons track and field team in the NCAA.

He was a kick returner for the Browns in their 1999 season, playing 14 games and returning 44 balls for 986 yards, fumbling 3 of them. In Week 14, he logged his first and only NFL reception of 45 yards, but in a later kickoff return, he fumbled the ball and sprained his neck, and was out the rest of the season. He was waived in the next preseason.
