= Orlando Bobo =

American gridiron football player (1974–2007)

No. 74
- Position: Offensive guard

Personal information
- Born: February 9, 1974; West Point, Mississippi, U.S.
- Died: May 14, 2007 (aged 33); Dallas, Texas, U.S.

Career information
- College: Northeast Louisiana
- NFL draft: 1996: undrafted
- Expansion draft: 1999: 1st round, 27th overall pick

Career history
- Minnesota Vikings (1996–1998); Cleveland Browns (1999); Baltimore Ravens (2000–2001); Minnesota Vikings (2002)*; Winnipeg Blue Bombers (2004)
- * Offseason or practice squad member only
- Stats at Pro Football Reference

Orlando Bobo (February 9, 1974 – May 14, 2007) was an American professional football player who played the position of guard for three National Football League (NFL) teams from 1997 to 2001 and in the Canadian Football League (CFL) for the Winnipeg Blue Bombers in 2004. He was a member of the Baltimore Ravens for their victory at Super Bowl XXXV.

Bobo died of heart and liver failure at the age of 33. He was buried at Greenwood Cemetery in West Point, Mississippi.
