= Richard Huntley =

American football player (born 1972)

No. 33, 34, 32
- Position: Running back

Personal information
- Born: September 18, 1972 (age 54); Monroe, North Carolina, U.S.
- Listed height: 5 ft 11 in (1.80 m)
- Listed weight: 224 lb (102 kg)

Career information
- High school: Monroe
- College: Winston-Salem State
- NFL draft: 1996: 4th round, 117th overall pick

Career history
- Atlanta Falcons (1996); Pittsburgh Steelers (1998–2000); Carolina Panthers (2001); Buffalo Bills (2002)*; Detroit Lions (2002)
- * Offseason or practice squad member only

Career NFL statistics
- Rushing yards: 1,701
- Rushing average: 4.7
- Receptions: 62
- Receiving yards: 477
- Total touchdowns: 15
- Stats at Pro Football Reference

Richard Earl Huntley (born September 18, 1972) is an American former professional football player who was a running back in the National Football League (NFL). He was selected in the fourth round of the 1996 NFL draft. He played six seasons for the Atlanta Falcons (1996), Pittsburgh Steelers (1998–2000), Carolina Panthers (2001), and Detroit Lions (2002). He played college football for the Winston-Salem State-Rams.
