= Ryan Taylor (linebacker) =

American football player (born 1976)

No. 56, 51
- Position: Linebacker

Personal information
- Born: December 11, 1976 (age 49); Dublin, Georgia, U.S.
- Listed height: 6 ft 2 in (1.88 m)
- Listed weight: 230 lb (104 kg)

Career information
- High school: Dublin
- College: Auburn (1995–1998)
- NFL draft: 1999: undrafted

Career history
- Cleveland Browns (1999–2000); → Scottish Claymores (2000); Oakland Raiders (2001)*
- * Offseason or practice squad member only

Career NFL statistics
- Games played: 4
- Tackles: 3
- Stats at Pro Football Reference

Ryan Taylor (born December 11, 1976) is an American former professional football linebacker who played in the National Football League (NFL) for the Cleveland Browns and Oakland Raiders. He played college football for the Auburn Tigers. Taylor also had a stint in NFL Europe with the Scottish Claymores.

== Early life ==
Taylor was born on December 11, 1976, in Dublin, Georgia. He attended Dublin High School in Dublin, where he played football and basketball. As a senior, Taylor had 120 tackles and 11 interceptions and was named an Class 3A All-State selection. He finished his career with 25 interceptions. On January 19, 1995, Taylor committed to play college football at Auburn University over offers from Florida, Georgia and South Carolina.

== College career ==
Taylor played college football for the Auburn Tigers from 1995 to 1998. He had three interceptions and returned one for a touchdown against Virginia.

== Professional career ==
=== Cleveland Browns ===
After going undrafted in the 1999 NFL draft, Taylor signed with the Cleveland Browns as an undrafted free agent. On September 5, he was waived and signed to the practice squad the next day. On February 11, 2000, Taylor signed a futures contract with the team. On August 27, he was released and signed to the practice squad. On October 13, Taylor was elevated to the active roster and made his debut on October 15 against the Denver Broncos, recording one tackle. On November 7, he was placed on the injured reserve after suffering a fractured fibula.

=== Scottish Claymores ===
On February 11, 2000, Taylor was allocated to the Scottish Claymores of NFL Europe. In ten games, he had 17 tackles, one sack, three pass deflections and one interception.

=== Oakland Raiders ===
On April 1, 2001, Taylor was signed by the Oakland Raiders. On August 28, he was released by the team.
