= Arnold Miller (American football) =

American football player (born 1975)

No. 98, 94
- Position: Defensive end

Personal information
- Born: January 3, 1975 (age 51); New Orleans, Louisiana, U.S.
- Listed height: 6 ft 3 in (1.91 m)
- Listed weight: 239 lb (108 kg)

Career information
- High school: George Washington Carver (New Orleans)
- College: LSU (1995–1998)
- NFL draft: 1999: undrafted

Career history
- Cleveland Browns (1999–2002); Carolina Panthers (2003)*; Los Angeles Avengers (2004); Carolina Panthers (2004)*; Toronto Argonauts (2004); Philadelphia Soul (2005)
- * Offseason or practice squad member only

Awards and highlights
- Grey Cup champion (2004); AFL All-Rookie Team (2004)

Career NFL statistics
- Games played: 21
- Tackles: 26
- Sacks: 2.5
- Forced fumbles: 1
- Stats at Pro Football Reference
- Stats at CFL.ca
- Stats at ArenaFan.com

Arnold Thomas Miller (born January 3, 1975) is an American former professional football defensive end who played in the National Football League (NFL) with the Cleveland Browns and Carolina Panthers. He played college football for the LSU Tigers.

== Early life ==
Miller was born on January 3, 1975 in New Orleans, Louisiana. He attended George Washington Carver High School in New Orleans.

== College career ==
Miller played college football for the LSU Tigers from 1995 to 1998. As a senior, he had 33 tackles, including ten for loss, five sacks and three blocked kicks.

== Professional career ==
Pre-draft measurables
Height	Weight	40-yard dash	10-yard split	20-yard split	20-yard shuttle	Three-cone drill	Vertical jump	Broad jump	Bench press
6 ft 4 in (1.93 m)	240 lb (109 kg)	4.75 s	1.64 s	2.78 s	4.12 s	7.01 s	33.5 in (0.85 m)	10 ft 0 in (3.05 m)	12 reps
All values from NFL Combine

=== Cleveland Browns ===
After going undrafted in the 1999 NFL draft, Miller signed with the Cleveland Browns as an undrafted free agent. He played in nine games his rookie season, recording 11 tackles, including three for loss and one sack. In 2000, Miller had 15 tackles, 1.5 sacks and one forced fumble in 12 games. On August 28, 2001, he was placed on the injured reserve with a broken foot and missed the season. On April 20, 2002, Miller was re-signed by the team. On August 31, he was released.

=== Carolina Panthers (first stint) ===
On January 8, 2003, Miller was signed by the Carolina Panthers. On September 1, 2003, he was released by the team.

=== Los Angeles Avengers ===
On November 6, 2003 Miller signed a three-year contract with the Los Angeles Avengers of the Arena Football League (AFL). He had 15 tackles, one sack, two pass deflections and one forced fumble. Miller was an AFL All-Rookie selection.

=== Carolina Panthers (second stint) ===
On August 16, 2004, Miller re-signed with the Panthers. On August 30, he was waived by the team.

=== Toronto Argonauts ===
On September 20, 2004, the Toronto Argonauts of the Canadian Football League (CFL) signed Miller. He played in one game against the Montreal Alouettes, recording one tackle. On November 4, Miller was placed on the injured list, where he remained for the rest of the season as the Argonauts won the 92nd Grey Cup. On May 29, 2005, he was put on the league suspension list and was eventually released from the team.

=== Philadelphia Soul ===
On November 31, 2004 the Philadelphia Soul acquired Miller for past considerations. He had four tackles, one fumble recovery and blocked kick. Miller became a free agent at the end of the season.
