= Wali Rainer =

American football player (born 1977)

No. 58
- Position: Linebacker

Personal information
- Born: April 19, 1977 (age 49); Rockingham, North Carolina, U.S.
- Listed height: 6 ft 2 in (1.88 m)
- Listed weight: 247 lb (112 kg)

Career information
- High school: West Charlotte (NC)
- College: Virginia
- NFL draft: 1999: 4th round, 124th overall pick

Career history
- Cleveland Browns (1999–2001); Jacksonville Jaguars (2002); Detroit Lions (2003–2005); Houston Texans (2006)

Career NFL statistics
- Tackles: 527
- Sacks: 4
- Interceptions: 1
- Stats at Pro Football Reference

Wali Rainer (born April 19, 1977) is an American former professional football player who was a linebacker in the National Football League (NFL). He played college football for the Virginia Cavaliers and was selected by the Cleveland Browns in the fourth round of the 1999 NFL draft.

Rainer also played for the Jacksonville Jaguars, Detroit Lions, and Houston Texans.

== Professional career ==
=== Cleveland Browns ===
Rainer was selected by the Cleveland Browns in the fourth round of the 1999 NFL draft. Rainer had a great rookie season leading the Browns in tackles with 136. He remained the Browns starting middle linebacker for the next two years recording 117 tackles in 2000 and 82 tackles in 2001.

=== Jacksonville Jaguars ===
On April 20, 2002, the Browns traded Rainer along with the 79th overall pick of the 2002 NFL draft to the Jacksonville Jaguars for the 76th overall pick of the 2002 NFL Draft. In his only season with the Jaguars he started 14 of 16 games at middle linebacker for the team and recorded 92 tackles.

=== Detroit Lions ===
On April 2, 2003 Rainer signed with the Detroit Lions. He played for the Lions from 2003 to 2005. He recorded 69 tackles during the three years.

=== Houston Texans ===
On April 4, 2006, he signed with the Houston Texans but was injured and placed on the injured reserve and never played a game for the team.
