= Marquis Smith =

American football player (born 1975)

No. 21, 41, 47
- Positions: Safety, linebacker

Personal information
- Born: January 13, 1975 (age 51); San Diego, California, U.S.

Career information
- High school: Patrick Henry (San Diego)
- College: California
- NFL draft: 1999: 3rd round, 76th overall pick

Career history
- Cleveland Browns (1999–2001); Carolina Panthers (2003)*; Oakland Raiders (2005)*
- * Offseason or practice squad member only

Awards and highlights
- Second-team All-Pac-10 (1998)

Career NFL statistics
- Tackles: 139
- Sacks: 1
- Pass deflections: 6
- Stats at Pro Football Reference

Marquis Trinnell Smith (born January 13, 1975) is an American former professional football player who was a safety and linebacker of the National Football League (NFL). He was selected by the Cleveland Browns in the third round of the 1999 NFL draft with the 76th overall pick. He played college football for the California Golden Bears
