= Tyrone Rogers =

American football player (born 1974)

No. 78
- Position: Defensive end

Personal information
- Born: March 9, 1974 (age 52); Montgomery, Alabama, U.S.

Career information
- High school: Montgomery (AL) Julian
- College: Alabama State
- NFL draft: 1999: undrafted

Career history
- Cleveland Browns (1999–2003); Greenbay Packers (2004)*; Cleveland Browns (2004)
- * Offseason or practice squad member only

Career NFL statistics
- Tackles: 125
- Sacks: 13.5
- Interceptions: 0
- Stats at Pro Football Reference

Tyrone B. Rogers (born March 9, 1974) is a former defensive end in the National Football League. He played his entire career for the Cleveland Browns from 1999 to 2004. After his Pro football career Rogers went back to Alabama as a defensive coach at Alabama State University, then later at Robert E. Lee High School in Montgomery, Alabama.
