= Lenoy Jones =

American football player (born 1974)

No. 57, 51, 56
- Position: Linebacker

Personal information
- Born: September 25, 1974 (age 52); Marlin, Texas, U.S.
- Listed height: 6 ft 1 in (1.85 m)
- Listed weight: 228 lb (103 kg)

Career information
- High school: Groesbeck (Groesbeck, Texas)
- College: TCU
- NFL draft: 1996: undrafted
- Expansion draft: 1999: 1st round, 10th overall pick

Career history
- Houston / Tennessee Oilers (1996–1998); Cleveland Browns (1999–2002)

Career NFL statistics
- Total tackles: 99
- Sacks: 3.5
- Forced fumbles: 1
- Fumble recoveries: 2
- Interceptions: 1
- Stats at Pro Football Reference

Lenoy Jones (born September 9, 1974) is an American former professional football player who was a linebacker for seven seasons in the National Football League (NFL) for the Houston / Tennessee Oilers and the Cleveland Browns. He played college football for the TCU Horned Frogs.

== Personal life ==
He is married to LaJuana Jones and is the father of five boys. Lenoy is an online learning teacher at Waco High School and football coach at Waco High School in Central Texas. His son Lenoy Jones Jr. played linebacker for the Baylor Bears.
