= Marcus Spriggs (defensive tackle) =

American football player (born 1976)

No. 91
- Position: Defensive tackle

Personal information
- Born: July 26, 1976 (age 50); Washington, D.C., U.S.
- Listed height: 6 ft 4 in (1.93 m)
- Listed weight: 314 lb (142 kg)

Career information
- High school: H.D. Woodson (Washington, D.C.)
- College: Troy State
- NFL draft: 1999: 6th round, 174th overall pick

Career history
- Cleveland Browns (1999–2002); Houston Texans (2003)*
- * Offseason or practice squad member only

Career NFL statistics
- GP / GS: 18 / 0
- Tackles: 20
- Sacks: 2
- FF / FR: 1 / 2
- Stats at Pro Football Reference

Marcus Spriggs (born July 26, 1976) is an American former professional football player who was a defensive tackle in the National Football League (NFL). He played college football for the Troy Trojans. He was selected by the Cleveland Browns in the sixth round of the 1999 NFL draft.

== College career ==
Spriggs originally attended Ohio State as a freshman in 1995. As a freshman, he recorded two tackles on the season. He then transferred to Troy for the remainder of his college career.

== Professional career ==
Spriggs was selected in the sixth round (174th overall) of the 1999 NFL draft by the Cleveland Browns, in the inaugural draft class for the returning franchise.

As a rookie, after appearing in 10 games and recording nine total tackles, Spriggs was placed on injured reserve with a shoulder injury.

In 2000, after appearing in the first eight games of the season and recording 11 tackles and two sacks, both sacks came against the Philadelphia Eagles, he was placed on injured reserve again, this time with an arm injury. On May 1, 2002, he was re-signed by the Browns to a one-year contract. He was later released on August 27, 2002 during training camp. On January 14, 2003, he was signed by the Houston Texans. He was released six months later.
