= Kevin Johnson (wide receiver) =

American football player (born 1976)

No. 85, 83
- Position: Wide receiver

Personal information
- Born: July 15, 1976 (age 50); Trenton, New Jersey, U.S.
- Listed height: 5 ft 11 in (1.80 m)
- Listed weight: 195 lb (88 kg)

Career information
- High school: Hamilton (NJ) West
- College: Syracuse
- NFL draft: 1999: 2nd round, 32nd overall pick

Career history
- Cleveland Browns (1999–2003); Jacksonville Jaguars (2003); Baltimore Ravens (2004); Detroit Lions (2005)

Awards and highlights
- NFL All-Rookie Team (1999); Big East Special Teams Player of the Year (1998)

Career NFL statistics
- Receptions: 384
- Receiving yards: 4,595
- Receiving touchdowns: 25
- Stats at Pro Football Reference

Kevin L. Johnson (born July 15, 1976) is an American former professional football player who was a wide receiver for seven seasons in the National Football League (NFL). He played college football for the Syracuse Orange before playing in the NFL for the Cleveland Browns, the Jacksonville Jaguars, the Baltimore Ravens, and the Detroit Lions.

During his freshman year at Syracuse, Johnson lost a quarterback competition to Donovan McNabb which precipitated a position switch to wide receiver.

== Professional career ==
Pre-draft measurables
Height	Weight	Arm length	Hand span	40-yard dash	10-yard split	20-yard split	20-yard shuttle	Three-cone drill	Vertical jump	Broad jump
5 ft 11 1/8 in (1.81 m)	194 lb (88 kg)	30 3/4 in (0.78 m)	10 in (0.25 m)	4.41 s	1.49 s	2.53 s	3.86 s	6.79 s	36.5 in (0.93 m)	9 ft 7 in (2.92 m)
All values from NFL Combine

Following his fourth season, Johnson was selected by the Cleveland Browns in the second round of the 1999 NFL draft. He caught a Hail Mary touchdown pass from Tim Couch as time expired against the New Orleans Saints to give the new Cleveland Browns their first win following the team's return to the NFL. Johnson played for the Browns until 2003, when he was cut mid-season by head coach Butch Davis after Johnson had many productive seasons as the Browns leading receiver. Johnson was subsequently claimed by 16 teams, and awarded to the Jaguars. The Jaguars later traded Johnson to the Ravens for a 4th round pick. The Ravens released Johnson after a single season. Johnson then signed as a free agent with the Detroit Lions. In a controversial move, Johnson was issued number 85, the first time the Lions had issued that number to a player since the death of Chuck Hughes in 1971. Johnson would only appear in six games during what would be his final season in the NFL in 2005.

== Post-NFL ==
Kevin Johnson spent years developing and constructing a massive multi-use complex in Bordentown, New Jersey, that includes a fitness center, health offices, as well as housing complex currently under construction. The complex is called Team 85 Campus. In June of 2024, Johnson purchased a car dealership in Burlington, NJ. The dealership is named Johnson Ford.
