= 2001 Jacksonville Jaguars season =

7th season in franchise history

- Owner: Wayne Weaver
- Head coach: Tom Coughlin
- Offensive coordinator: Bobby Petrino
- Defensive coordinator: Gary Moeller
- Home stadium: Alltel Stadium

Results
- Record: 6–10
- Division place: 5th AFC Central
- Playoffs: Did not qualify
- Pro Bowlers: WR Jimmy Smith

Uniform

The 2001 season was the Jacksonville Jaguars' 7th season in the National Football League (NFL) and their 7th season under the leadership of general manager and head coach Tom Coughlin. The Jaguars failed to improve on their 7–9 record from the previous season after a Week 16 loss to the Kansas City Chiefs nor match it after a Week 17 loss to the Chicago Bears, finishing the season at 6–10.

This was the first year where the Jaguars wore black shoes to their uniforms, but as of 2024 the team mixed up their combo to include white and teal shoes.

== Offseason ==
Additions	Subtractions
WR Sean Dawkins (Seahawks)	WR Reggie Barlow (Raiders)
P Chris Hanson (Dolphins)	FB Daimon Shelton (Bears)
	G Brenden Stai (Lions)
	P Bryan Barker (Redskins)
	T Leon Searcy (Ravens)
	QB Jamie Martin (Rams)
	S Mike Logan (Steelers)

=== NFL draft ===
2001 Jacksonville Jaguars draft
Round	Pick	Player	Position	College	Notes
1	13	Marcus Stroud *	Defensive tackle	Georgia	
2	43	Maurice Williams	Offensive tackle	Michigan	
3	73	Eric Westmoreland	Linebacker	Tennessee	
3	94	James Boyd	Safety	Penn State	
5	142	David Leaverton	Punter	Tennessee	
6	170	Chad Ward	Guard	Washington	
7	213	Anthony Denman	Linebacker	Notre Dame	
7	233	Marlon McCree	Safety	Kentucky	
7	235	Richmond Flowers III	Wide receiver	Tennessee-Chattanooga	
7	241	Randy Chevrier	Defensive tackle	McGill	
Made roster † Pro Football Hall of Fame * Made at least one Pro Bowl during career

=== Undrafted free agents ===
2001 undrafted free agents of note
Player	Position	College
Delvin Brown	Safety	Miami (FL)
Jimmy Blanchard	Quarterback	Portland State
McAllister Collins	Center	Northern Illinois
Ryan Goven	Linebacker	North Dakota
Ryan Harklau	Defensive tackle	Iowa State
Marcellus Harris	Wide receiver	East Carolina
Brent Johnson	Defensive end	Ohio State
Elvis Joseph	Running back	Southern
Radell Lockhart	Defensive end	Catawba
Jeff Long	Tackle	Utah State
Antonio Mays	Defensive tackle	Southern
Ryan Prince	Tight end	Weber State
Chandler Smith	Defensive back	Southern Miss
Antonio Stanley	Wide receiver	Bethune–Cookman
Patrick Venzke	Tackle	Idaho
Patrick Washington	Fullback	Virginia
James Watkins	Safety	Tennessee State
Jerry Westbrooks	Running back	Ohio State
Brian Williams	Linebacker	Northwest Missouri State
Randal Williams	Wide receiver	New Hampshire
Billy Young	Guard	Appalachian State

== Staff ==
2001 Jacksonville Jaguars staff
Front office: Chairman/chief executive officer – Wayne Weaver; Senior vice president of football operations – Michael Huyghue; Director of player personnel - Rick Reiprish; Director of college scouting – Gene Smith; Director of pro scouting – Fran Foley; College scout - Louis Clark; Head coaches: Head coach – Tom Coughlin; Offensive coaches: Offensive coordinator – Bobby Petrino; Running backs – Jerald Ingram; Wide receivers – John McNulty; Tight ends – Fred Hoaglin; Offensive line – Mike Maser; Offensive quality control – Garrick McGee	Defensive coaches: Defensive coordinator – Gary Moeller; Defensive line – John Pease; Linebackers – Steve Szabo; Outside linebackers – Lucious Selmon; Defensive backs – Perry Fewell; Defensive quality control – Paul Haynes; Special teams coaches: Special teams coordinator – Frank Gansz; Assistant special teams/administrative assistant to the head coach – John Bonamego; Strength and conditioning: Strength and conditioning – Jerry Palmieri; Assistant strength and conditioning – Greg Finnegan

== Final roster ==
2001 Jacksonville Jaguars roster
Quarterbacks (QB): 8 Mark Brunell; 12 Jonathan Quinn; 10 Rod Robinson; Running backs (RB): 35 Elvis Joseph; 34 Stacey Mack; 28 Fred Taylor; 31 Patrick Washington FB; 22 Reggie White; Wide receivers (WR): 84 Sean Dawkins; 85 Damon Gibson; 87 Keenan McCardell; 86 Micah Ross; 82 Jimmy Smith; 81 R. Jay Soward; Tight ends (TE): 80 Kyle Brady; 89 Ryan Prince	Offensive linemen (OL): 72 Derrick Chambers T; 78 Todd Fordham T; 64 Aaron Koch G; 63 Brad Meester G; 73 Jeff Smith C; 70 Patrick Venzke T; 66 John Wade C; 77 Zach Wiegert G; 74 Maurice Williams T; Defensive linemen (DL): 90 Tony Brackens DE; 92 Rob Meier DE; 91 Seth Payne DT; 94 Larry Smith DT; 95 Paul Spicer DE; 99 Marcus Stroud DT; 96 Gary Walker DT; 97 Renaldo Wynn DE	Linebackers (LB): 55 Danny Clark OLB; 54 Donny Green OLB; 56 Hardy Nickerson MLB; 58 Jeff Posey OLB; 59 Edward Thomas OLB; 57 Joe Tuipala MLB; 50 Joe Wesley MLB; 52 Eric Westmoreland OLB; Defensive backs (DB): 26 Ainsley Battles FS; 42 James Boyd FS; 36 Renard Cox CB; 29 Jason Craft CB; 20 Donovin Darius SS; 32 Marlon McCree FS; 41 Kiwaukee Thomas CB; 27 Damen Wheeler CB; Special teams (ST): 2 Chris Hanson P; 1 Mike Hollis K; 3 Jaret Holmes K; 83 Joe Zelenka LS	Practice squad: 17 Henry Douglas WR; 65 Tam Hopkins G; 19 Ramondo North WR; 48 Tevita Ofahengaue FB; 98 Randy Garner DE; Reserve: 69 Mike Baniewicz T (IR); 21 Aaron Beasley CB (IR); 71 Tony Boselli T (IR); 25 Fernando Bryant CB (IR); 51 Kevin Hardy LB (IR); 45 Erik Olson S (IR); 53 T. J. Slaughter LB (IR); -- Emanuel Smith WR (IR); Rookies in italics 53 active, 8 reserve, 5 practice squad

== Preseason ==
Week	Date	Opponent	Result	Record	Venue
1	August 10	Carolina Panthers	W 18–16	1–0	Alltel Stadium
2	August 16	at New York Giants	L 5–27	1–1	Giants Stadium
3	August 23	Kansas City Chiefs	W 28–23	2–1	Alltel Stadium
4	August 30	Dallas Cowboys	L 17–27	2–2	Texas Stadium

== Regular season ==
=== Schedule ===
Week	Date	Opponent	Result	Record	Venue	Attendance
1	September 9	**Pittsburgh Steelers**	**W** 21–3	1–0	Alltel Stadium	63,785
2 (Note: The Jaguars were originally scheduled to play the Chicago Bears during Week 2 of the original NFL schedule (September 16) at Soldier Field in Chicago. However, due to the September 11 attacks, the game was rescheduled to Week 17.)	September 23	**Tennessee Titans**	**W** 13–6	2–0	Alltel Stadium	65,994
3	September 30	**Cleveland Browns**	**L** 14–23	2–1	Alltel Stadium	57,875
4	October 7	at Seattle Seahawks	**L** 15–24	2–2	Husky Stadium	54,524
5	Bye					
6	October 18	Buffalo Bills	**L** 10–13	2–3	Alltel Stadium	58,893
7	October 28	at **Baltimore Ravens**	**L** 17–18	2–4	PSINet Stadium	69,439
8	November 4	at **Tennessee Titans**	**L** 24–28	2–5	Adelphia Coliseum	68,798
9	November 11	**Cincinnati Bengals**	**W** 30–13	3–5	Alltel Stadium	57,161
10	November 18	at **Pittsburgh Steelers**	**L** 7–20	3–6	Heinz Field	62,644
11	November 25	**Baltimore Ravens**	**L** 21–24	3–7	Alltel Stadium	53,530
12	December 3	Green Bay Packers	**L** 21–28	3–8	Alltel Stadium	66,908
13	December 9	at **Cincinnati Bengals**	**W** 14–10	4–8	Paul Brown Stadium	44,920
14	December 16	at **Cleveland Browns**	**W** 15–10	5–8	Cleveland Browns Stadium	72,818
15	December 23	at Minnesota Vikings	**W** 33–3	6–8	Hubert H. Humphrey Metrodome	64,150
16	December 30	Kansas City Chiefs	**L** 26–30	6–9	Alltel Stadium	59,396
17	January 6	at Chicago Bears	**L** 13–33	6–10	Soldier Field	66,944

Note: Intra-division opponents are in bold text.

=== Game summaries ===
==== Week 1: vs. Pittsburgh Steelers ====
Week One: Pittsburgh Steelers at Jacksonville Jaguars – Game summary

Quarter	1	2	3	4	Total
Steelers	0	3	0	0	**3**
**Jaguars**	0	21	0	0	**21**

at Alltel Stadium, Jacksonville, Florida

- Date: September 9, 2001
- Game time: 1:00 p.m. EDT
- Game weather: 83 °F (28 °C)
- Game attendance: 63,785
- Referee: Mack Gentry
- TV announcers (CBS): Don Criqui, Craig James, and Beasley Reece
- Recap, Game Book

Game information

**First quarter**

- No scoring plays.

**Second quarter**

- PIT – Kris Brown 41-yard field goal, 14:20. Steelers 3–0. **Drive: 13 plays, 57 yards, 7:10.**
- JAX – Jimmy Smith 34-yard pass from Mark Brunell (Mike Hollis kick), 11:40. Jaguars 7–3. **Drive: 6 plays, 74 yards, 2:40.**
- JAX – Jimmy Smith 15-yard pass from Mark Brunell (Mike Hollis kick), 6:33. Jaguars 14–3. **Drive: 8 plays, 50 yards, 3:45.**
- JAX – Damon Jones 1-yard pass from Mark Brunell (Mike Hollis kick), 3:26. Jaguars 21–3. **Drive: 2 plays, 23 yards, 0:54.**

**Third quarter**

- No scoring plays.

**Fourth quarter**

- No scoring plays.

Top passers

- PIT – Kordell Stewart – 21/37, 181 yards, 2 INT
- JAX – Mark Brunell – 15/26, 198 yards, 3 TD

Top rushers

- PIT – Amos Zereoue – 9 rushes, 60 yards
- JAX – Fred Taylor – 24 rushes, 96 yards

Top receivers

- PIT – Hines Ward – 7 receptions, 82 yards
- JAX – Jimmy Smith – 8 receptions, 126 yards, 2 TD

==== Week 2: vs. Tennessee Titans ====
Week Two: Tennessee Titans at Jacksonville Jaguars – Game summary

Quarter	1	2	3	4	Total
Titans	3	3	0	0	**6**
**Jaguars**	3	7	3	0	**13**

at Alltel Stadium, Jacksonville, Florida

- Date: September 23, 2001
- Game time: 1:10 p.m. EDT
- Game weather: 84 °F (29 °C)
- Game attendance: 65,994
- Referee: Bernie Kukar
- TV announcers (CBS): Gus Johnson, Brent Jones, and Sam Wyche
- Recap, Game Book

Game information

**First quarter**

- TEN – Joe Nedney 22-yard field goal, 5:21. Titans 3–0. **Drive: 9 plays, 41 yards, 4:03.**
- JAX – Mike Hollis 35-yard field goal, 0:01. Tied 3–3. **Drive: 10 plays, 63 yards, 5:20.**

**Second quarter**

- TEN – Joe Nedney 43-yard field goal, 8:33. Titans 6–3. **Drive: 7 plays, 34 yards, 3:33.**
- JAX – Stacey Mack 22-yard run (Mike Hollis kick), 4:56. Jaguars 10–6. **Drive: 9 plays, 78 yards, 3:37.**

**Third quarter**

- JAX – Mike Hollis 39-yard field goal, 2:06. Jaguars 13–6. **Drive: 10 plays, 56 yards, 4:48.**

**Fourth quarter**

- No scoring plays.

**Top passers**

- TEN – Neil O'Donnell – 21/36, 215 yards
- JAX – Mark Brunell – 17/27, 235 yards

**Top rushers**

- TEN – Eddie George – 20 rushes, 79 yards
- JAX – Stacey Mack – 18 rushes, 80 yards, TD

**Top receivers**

- TEN – Erron Kinney – 4 receptions, 53 yards
- JAX – Jimmy Smith – 7 receptions, 87 yards

==== Week 3: vs. Cleveland Browns ====
Week Three: Cleveland Browns at Jacksonville Jaguars – Game summary

Quarter	1	2	3	4	Total
**Browns**	3	10	0	10	**23**
Jaguars	0	0	14	0	**14**

at Alltel Stadium, Jacksonville, Florida

- Date: September 30, 2001
- Game time: 4:15 p.m. EST
- Game weather: 72 °F (22 °C)
- Game attendance: 51,262
- Referee: Bob McElwee
- TV announcers (CBS): Tim Brando and Spencer Tillman
- Recap, Game Book

Game information

**First quarter**

- CLE – Phil Dawson 35-yard field goal, 11:12. Browns 3–0. **Drive: 4 plays, -3 yards, 1:10.**

**Second quarter**

- CLE – Jamel White 4-yard run (Phil Dawson kick), 3:18. Browns 10–0. **Drive: 19 plays, 80 yards, 10:14.**
- CLE – Phil Dawson 28-yard field goal, 0:11. Browns 13–0. **Drive: 8 plays, 22 yards, 1:35.**

**Third quarter**

- JAX – Keenan McCardell 8-yard pass from Jonathan Quinn (Mike Hollis kick), 9:43. Browns 13–7. **Drive: 9 plays, 69 yards, 5:17.**
- JAX – Aaron Beasley 40-yard fumble return (Mike Hollis kick), 8:53. Jaguars 14–13.

**Fourth quarter**

- CLE – Phil Dawson 30-yard field goal, 5:13. Browns 16–14. **Drive: 11 plays, 66 yards, 6:19.**
- CLE – Daylon McCutcheon 32-yard interception return (Phil Dawson kick), 0:35. Browns 23–14.

**Top passers**

- CLE – Tim Couch – 24/34, 249 yards, INT
- JAX – Jonathan Quinn – 15/30, 136 yards, TD, INT

**Top rushers**

- CLE – Jamel White – 23 rushes, 64 yards
- JAX – Stacey Mack – 17 rushes, 97 yards

**Top receivers**

- CLE – Kevin Johnson – 6 receptions, 80 yards
- JAX – Jimmy Smith – 9 receptions, 88 yards

==== Week 4: at Seattle Seahawks ====
Week Four: Jacksonville Jaguars at Seattle Seahawks – Game summary

Quarter	1	2	3	4	Total
Jaguars	3	9	3	0	**15**
**Seahawks**	14	7	0	3	**24**

at Husky Stadium, Seattle, Washington

- Date: October 7, 2001
- Game time: 1:05 p.m. PDT
- Game weather: Overcast, 50 °F (10 °C)
- Game attendance: 54,524
- Referee: Tony Corrente
- TV announcers (CBS): Ian Eagle and Solomon Wilcots
- Recap, Game Book

Game information

**First quarter**

- JAX – Mike Hollis 32-yard field goal, 9:12. Jaguars 3–0. **Drive: 12 plays, 63 yards, 5:48.**
- SEA – Itula Mili 1-yard pass from Trent Dilfer (Rian Lindell kick), 6:11. Seahawks 7–3. **Drive: 6 plays, 71 yards, 3:01.**
- SEA – Shaun Alexander 14-yard run (Rian Lindell kick), 2:03. Seahawks 14–3. **Drive: 7 plays, 63 yards, 2:58.**

**Second quarter**

- JAX – Mike Hollis 48-yard field goal, 8:41. Seahawks 14–6. **Drive: 5 plays, 13 yards, 2:16.**
- JAX – Elvis Joseph 18-yard pass from Mark Brunell (run failed), 8:19. Seahawks 14–12. **Drive: 1 play, 18 yards, 0:09.**
- SEA – Shaun Alexander 3-yard run (Rian Lindell kick), 5:06. Seahawks 21–12. **Drive: 5 plays, 62 yards, 3:13.**

**Third quarter**

- JAX – Mike Hollis 48-yard field goal, 9:26. Seahawks 21–15. **Drive: 5 plays, 19 yards, 1:58.**

**Fourth quarter**

- SEA – Rian Lindell 25-yard field goal, 7:39. Seahawks 24–15. **Drive: 11 plays, 45 yards, 6:06.**

**Top passers**

- JAX – Mark Brunell – 21/39, 233 yards, TD
- SEA – Trent Dilfer – 15/23, 219 yards, TD, INT

**Top rushers**

- JAX – Elvis Joseph – 12 rushes, 39 yards
- SEA – Shaun Alexander – 31 rushes, 176 yards, 2 TD

**Top receivers**

- JAX – Keenan McCardell – 7 receptions, 97 yards
- SEA – Bobby Engram – 5 receptions, 71 yards

==== Week 6: vs. Buffalo Bills ====
Week Six: Buffalo Bills at Jacksonville Jaguars – Game summary

Quarter	1	2	3	4	Total
**Bills**	0	3	7	3	**13**
Jaguars	0	0	7	3	**10**

at Alltel Stadium, Jacksonville, Florida

- Date: October 18, 2001
- Game time: 8:35 p.m. EDT
- Game weather: 66 °F (19 °C)
- Game attendance: 54,524
- Referee: Gerry Austin
- TV announcers (ESPN): Mike Patrick, Joe Theismann, Paul Maguire, and Suzy Kolber
- Recap, Game Book

Game information

**First quarter**

- No scoring plays.

**Second quarter**

- BUF – Jake Arians 30-yard field goal, 2:58. Bills 3–0. **Drive: 12 plays, 67 yards, 6:33.**

**Third quarter**

- JAX – Kyle Brady 20-yard pass from Mark Brunell (Mike Hollis kick), 12:06. Jaguars 7–3. **Drive: 5 plays, 76 yards, 2:54.**
- BUF – Eric Moulds 27-yard pass from Rob Johnson (Jake Arians kick), 7:01. Bills 10–7. **Drive: 9 plays, 63 yards, 5:05.**

**Fourth quarter**

- JAX – Mike Hollis 41-yard field goal, 3:54. Tied 10–10. **Drive: 4 plays, 6 yards, 1:21.**
- BUF – Jake Arians 46-yard field goal, 1:03. Bills 13–10. **Drive: 10 plays, 48 yards, 2:51.**

**Top passers**

- BUF – Rob Johnson – 23/30, 238 yards, TD
- JAX – Mark Brunell – 16/26, 150 yards, TD, 2 INT

**Top rushers**

- BUF – Travis Henry – 27 rushes, 63 yards
- JAX – Stacey Mack – 15 rushes, 84 yards

**Top receivers**

- BUF – Eric Moulds – 4 receptions, 60 yards
- JAX – Jimmy Smith – 6 receptions, 49 yards

==== Week 7: at Baltimore Ravens ====
Week Seven: Jacksonville Jaguars at Baltimore Ravens – Game summary

Quarter	1	2	3	4	Total
Jaguars	0	3	7	7	**17**
**Ravens**	0	3	3	12	**18**

at PSINet Stadium, Baltimore, Maryland

- Date: October 28, 2001
- Game time: 1:00 p.m. EST
- Game weather: Partly sunny, 50 °F (10 °C)
- Game attendance: 69,439
- Referee: Jeff Triplette
- TV announcers (CBS): Dick Enberg, Dan Dierdorf, and Bonnie Bernstein
- Recap, Game Book

Game information

**First quarter**

- No scoring plays.

**Second quarter**

- BAL – Matt Stover 49-yard field goal, 14:55. Ravens 3–0. **Drive: 10 plays, 59 yards, 5:39.**
- JAX – Mike Hollis 40-yard field goal, 11:31. Tied 3–3. **Drive: 8 plays, 60 yards, 3:24.'**

**Third quarter**

- BAL – Matt Stover 28-yard field goal, 10:17. Ravens 6–3. **Drive: 9 plays, 58 yards, 4:43.**
- JAX – Jimmy Smith 35-yard pass from Mark Brunell (Mike Hollis kick), 1:20. Jaguars 10–6. **Drive: 8 plays, 90 yards, 3:10.**

**Fourth quarter**

- JAX – Stacey Mack 11-yard pass from Mark Brunell (Mike Hollis kick), 14:53. Jaguars 17–6. **Drive: 2 plays, 45 yards, 0:30.**
- BAL – Jason Brookins 2-yard run (pass failed), 9:48. Jaguars 17–12. **Drive: 9 plays, 71 yards, 5:05.**
- BAL – Qadry Ismail 2-yard pass from Randall Cunningham (pass failed), 4:07. Ravens 18–17. **Drive: 8 plays, 56 yards, 4:01.**

**Top passers**

- JAX – Mark Brunell – 25/37, 306 yards, 2 TD
- BAL – Randall Cunningham – 23/31, 222 yards, TD, INT

**Top rushers**

- JAX – Mark Brunell – 4 rushes, 55 yards
- BAL – Jason Brookins – 19 rushes, 82 yards, TD

**Top receivers**

- JAX – Jimmy Smith – 7 receptions, 119 yards, 3 TD
- BAL – Shannon Sharpe – 7 receptions, 89 yards

==== Week 8: at Tennessee Titans ====
Week Eight: Jacksonville Jaguars at Tennessee Titans – Game summary

Quarter	1	2	3	4	Total
Jaguars	0	17	0	7	**24**
**Titans**	7	0	7	14	**28**

at Adelphia Coliseum, Nashville, Tennessee

- Date: November 4, 2001
- Game time: 1:00 p.m. EST
- Game weather: Sunny & slight cloudy, 67 °F (19 °C)
- Game attendance: 68,798
- Referee: Bernie Kukar
- TV announcers (CBS): Ian Eagle and Solomon Wilcots
- Recap, Game Book

Game information

**First quarter**

- TEN – Kevin Dyson 20-yard pass from Steve McNair (Joe Nedney kick), 6:15. Titans 7–0. **Drive: 6 plays, 58 yards, 2:47.**

**Second quarter**

- JAX – Stacey Mack 2-yard run (Mike Hollis kick), 14:12. Tied 7–7. **Drive: 9 plays, 52 yards, 4:17.**
- JAX – Kyle Brady 3-yard pass from Mark Brunell (Mike Hollis kick), 7:40. Jaguars 14–7. **Drive: 9 plays, 59 yards, 3:24.**
- JAX – Mike Hollis 38-yard field goal, 0:00. Jaguars 17–7. **Drive: 7 plays, 44 yards, 1:12.**

**Third quarter**

- TEN – Steve McNair 5-yard run (Joe Nedney kick), 6:59. Jaguars 17–14. **Drive: 12 plays, 77 yards, 6:57.**

**Fourth quarter**

- TEN – Derrick Mason 5-yard pass from Steve McNair (Joe Nedney kick), 14:07. Titans 21–17. **Drive: 10 plays, 80 yards, 5:25.**
- JAX – Frank Moreau 4-yard run (Mike Hollis kick), 3:05. Jaguars 24–21. **Drive: 8 plays, 84 yards, 3:38.**
- TEN – Steve McNair 1-yard run (Joe Nedney kick), 0:44. Titans 28–24. **Drive: 10 plays, 59 yards, 2:21.**

Top passers

- JAX – Mark Brunell – 21/32, 261 yards, TD, INT
- TEN – Steve McNair – 27/34, 241 yards, 2 TD

Top rushers

- JAX – Elvis Joseph – 6 rushes, 22 yards
- TEN – Steve McNair – 10 rushes, 74 yards

Top receivers

- JAX – Jimmy Smith – 7 receptions, 120 yards
- TEN – Kevin Dyson – 4 receptions, 62 yards

==== Week 9: vs. Cincinnati Bengals ====
Week Nine: Cincinnati Bengals at Jacksonville Jaguars – Game summary

Quarter	1	2	3	4	Total
Bengals	0	13	0	0	**13**
**Jaguars**	7	0	21	2	**30**

at Alltel Stadium, Jacksonville, Florida

- Date: November 11, 2001
- Game time: 1:00 p.m. EST
- Game weather: 73 °F (23 °C)
- Game attendance: 57,161
- Referee: Terry McAulay
- TV announcers (CBS): Don Criqui and Steve Tasker
- Recap, Game Book

Game information

**First quarter**

- JAX – Stacey Mack 1-yard run (Mike Hollis kick), 8:18. Jaguars 7–0. **Drive: 5 plays, 14 yards, 1:42.**

**Second quarter**

- CIN – Neil Rackers 26-yard field goal, 9:33. Jaguars 7–3. **Drive: 8 plays, 49 yards, 3:07.**
- CIN – Corey Dillon 7-yard run (Neil Rackers kick), 4:03. Bengals 10–7. **Drive: 8 plays, 59 yards, 3:59.**
- CIN – Neil Rackers 52-yard field goal, 0:00. Bengals 13–7. **Drive: 9 plays, 35 yards, 1:40.**

**Third quarter**

- JAX – Jimmy Smith 5-yard pass from Mark Brunell (Mike Hollis kick), 10:29. Jaguars 14–13 **Drive: 9 plays, 65 yards, 4:31.**
- JAX – Stacey Mack 2-yard run (Mike Hollis kick), 4:25. Jaguars 21–13. **Drive: 6 plays, 82 yards, 2:52.**
- JAX – Keenan McCardell 20-yard pass from Mark Brunell (Mike Hollis kick), 0:46. Jaguars 28–13. **Drive: 5 plays, 57 yards, 2:22.**

**Fourth quarter**

- JAX – Jon Kitna sacked in end zone by Tony Brackens, 6:05. Jaguars 30–13.

Top passers

- CIN – Jon Kitna – 28/48, 303 yards, INT
- JAX – Mark Brunell – 20/32, 189 yards, 2 TD

Top rushers

- CIN – Corey Dillon – 17 rushes, 58 yards, TD
- JAX – Stacey Mack – 15 rushes, 71 yards, 2 TD

Top receivers

- CIN – T. J. Houshmandzadeh – 6 receptions, 62 yards
- JAX – Jimmy Smith – 8 receptions, 63 yards, TD

==== Week 10: at Pittsburgh Steelers ====
Week Ten: Jacksonville Jaguars at Pittsburgh Steelers – Game summary

Quarter	1	2	3	4	Total
Jaguars	0	0	7	0	**7**
**Steelers**	3	3	7	7	**20**

at Heinz Field, Pittsburgh, Pennsylvania

- Date: November 18, 2001
- Game time: 4:05 p.m. EST
- Game weather: Partly sunny, 57 °F (14 °C)
- Game attendance: 62,644
- Referee: Ron Winter
- TV announcers (CBS): Ian Eagle and Solomon Wilcots
- Recap, Game Book

Game information

**First quarter**

- PIT – Kris Brown 48-yard field goal, 0:47. Steelers 3–0. **Drive: 13 plays, 57 yards, 7:46.**

**Second quarter**

- PIT – Kris Brown 28-yard field goal, 0:06. Steelers 6–0. **Drive: 10 plays, 59 yards, 1:38.**

**Third quarter**

- PIT – Hines Ward 28-yard pass from Kordell Stewart (Kris Brown kick), 0:19. Steelers 13–0. **Drive: 6 plays, 56 yards, 1:59.**
- JAX – Elvis Joseph 95-yard kickoff return (Mike Hollis kick), 0:00. Steelers 13–7.

**Fourth quarter**

- PIT – Kordell Stewart 7-yard run (Kris Brown kick), 1:56. Jaguars 20–7. **Drive: 5 plays, 79 yards, 2:05.**

Top passers

- JAX – Jonathan Quinn – 17/31, 225 yards
- PIT – Kordell Stewart – 21/33, 266 yards, TD

Top rushers

- JAX – Jonathan Quinn – 4 rushes, 39 yards
- PIT – Jerome Bettis – 21 rushes, 52 yards

Top receivers

- JAX – Keenan McCardell – 7 receptions, 89 yards
- PIT – Hines Ward – 9 receptions, 112 yards, TD

==== Week 11: vs. Baltimore Ravens ====
Week Eleven: Baltimore Ravens at Jacksonville Jaguars – Game summary

Quarter	1	2	3	4	Total
**Ravens**	3	7	7	7	**24**
Jaguars	0	0	7	14	**21**

at Alltel Stadium, Jacksonville, Florida

- Date: November 25, 2001
- Game time: 4:15 p.m. EST
- Game weather: 79 °F (26 °C)
- Game attendance: 53,530
- Referee: Larry Nemers
- TV announcers (CBS): Gus Johnson and Brent Jones
- Recap, Game Book

Game information

**First quarter**

- BAL – Matt Stover 41-yard field goal, 6:23. Ravens 3–0. **Drive: 10 plays, 65 yards, 5:03.**

**Second quarter**

- BAL – Jason Brookins 2-yard run (Matt Stover kick), 13:43. Ravens 10–0. **Drive: 12 plays, 64 yards, 5:46.**

**Third quarter**

- BAL – Jason Brookins 1-yard run (Matt Stover kick), 11:07. Ravens 17–0. **Drive: 6 plays, 31 yards, 2:34.**
- JAX – Stacey Mack 4-yard run (Mike Hollis kick), 1:44. Ravens 17–7. **Drive: 10 plays, 71 yards, 3:23.**

**Fourth quarter**

- JAX – Jimmy Smith 12-yard pass from Mark Brunell (Mike Hollis kick), 8:16. Ravens 17–14. **Drive: 7 plays, 87 yards, 2:49.**
- JAX – Stacey Mack 3-yard run (Mike Hollis kick), 1:32. Jaguars 21–17. **Drive: 8 plays, 38 yards, 2:47.**
- BAL – Shannon Sharpe 3-yard pass from Elvis Grbac (Matt Stover kick), 0:09. Ravens 24–21. **Drive: 9 plays, 74 yards, 1:23.**

**Top passers**

- BAL – Elvis Grbac – 21/30, 259 yards, TD, INT
- JAX – Mark Brunell – 23/38, 259 yards, TD

**Top rushers**

- BAL – Jason Brookins – 32 rushes, 82 yards, 2 TD
- JAX – Stacey Mack – 13 rushes, 50 yards, 2 TD

**Top receivers**

- BAL – Shannon Sharpe – 6 receptions, 55 yards, TD
- JAX – Keenan McCardell – 6 receptions, 80 yards

==== Week 12: vs. Green Bay Packers ====
Week Twelve: Green Bay Packers at Jacksonville Jaguars – Game summary

Quarter	1	2	3	4	Total
**Packers**	0	7	14	7	**28**
Jaguars	3	10	8	0	**21**

at Alltel Stadium, Jacksonville, Florida

- Date: December 3, 2001
- Game time: 9:00 p.m. EST
- Game weather: 56 °F (13 °C)
- Game attendance: 66,908
- Referee: Mike Carey
- TV announcers (ABC): Al Michaels, Dan Fouts, Dennis Miller, Melissa Stark, and Eric Dickerson
- Recap, Game Book

Game information

**First quarter**

- JAX – Mike Hollis 34-yard field goal, 11:21. Jaguars 3–0. **Drive: 8 plays, 48 yards, 3:39.**

**Second quarter**

- JAX – Elvis Joseph 29-yard pass from Mark Brunell (Mike Hollis kick), 7:11. Jaguars 10–0. **Drive: 7 plays, 58 yards, 2:49.**
- JAX – Mike Hollis 30-yard field goal, 1:55. Jaguars 13–0. **Drive: 8 plays, 42 yards, 4:22.**
- GB – Ahman Green 13-yard pass from Brett Favre (Ryan Longwell kick), 0:25. Jaguars 13–7. **Drive: 6 plays, 68 yards, 1:30.**

**Third quarter**

- JAX – Ainsley Battles 60-yard fumble return (pass succeeded), 3:45. Jaguars 21–7.
- GB – Bill Schroeder 43-yard pass from Brett Favre (Ryan Longwell kick), 2:38. Jaguars 21–14. **Drive: 3 plays, 55 yards, 1:07.**
- GB – Bubba Franks 1-yard pass from Brett Favre (Ryan Longwell kick), 0:58. Tied 21–21. **Drive: 3 plays, 32 yards, 1:29.**

**Fourth quarter**

- GB – Brett Favre 6-yard run (Ryan Longwell kick), 1:30. Packer 28–21. **Drive: 4 plays, 56 yards, 0:33.**

**Top passers**

- GB – Brett Favre – 24/42, 362 yards, 3 TD
- JAX – Mark Brunell – 26/45, 311 yards, TD, 2 INT

**Top rushers**

- GB – Ahman Green – 17 rushes, 31 yards
- JAX – Stacey Mack – 16 rushes, 27 yards

**Top receivers**

- GB – Bill Schroeder – 6 receptions, 106 yards, TD
- JAX – Jimmy Smith – 8 receptions, 116 yards

==== Week 13: at Cincinnati Bengals ====
Week Thirteen: Jacksonville Jaguars at Cincinnati Bengals – Game summary

Quarter	1	2	3	4	Total
**Jaguars**	7	0	0	7	**14**
Bengals	0	7	3	0	**10**

at Paul Brown Stadium, Cincinnati, Ohio

- Date: December 9, 2001
- Game time: 1:00 p.m. EST
- Game weather: Sunny, 42 °F (6 °C)
- Game attendance: 44,920
- Referee: Tony Corrente
- TV announcers (CBS): Don Criqui and Steve Tasker
- Recap, Game Book

Game information

**First quarter**

- JAX – Jimmy Smith 17-yard pass from Mark Brunell (Mike Hollis kick), 1:51. Jaguars 7–0. **Drive: 9 plays, 69 yards, 4:31.**

**Second quarter**

- CIN – Corey Dillon 9-yard run (Neil Rackers kick), 1:09. Tied 7–7. **Drive: 6 plays, 38 yards, 1:43.**

**Third quarter**

- CIN – Neil Rackers 47-yard field goal, 5:41. Bengals 10–7. **Drive: 10 plays, 46 yards, 6:20.**

**Fourth quarter**

- JAX – Keenan McCardell 11-yard pass from Mark Brunell (Mike Hollis kick), 14:27. Jaguars 14–10. **Drive: 6 plays, 38 yards, 2:01.**

Top passers

- JAX – Mark Brunell – 23/32, 242 yards, 2 TD, INT
- CIN – Jon Kitna – 16/30, 147 yards, INT

Top rushers

- JAX – Stacey Mack – 14 rushes, 23 yards
- CIN – Corey Dillon – 24 rushes, 62 yards, TD

Top receivers

- JAX – Jimmy Smith – 9 receptions, 119 yards, TD
- CIN – Chad Johnson – 4 receptions, 47 yards

==== Week 14: at Cleveland Browns ====
Week Fourteen: Jacksonville Jaguars at Cleveland Browns – Game summary

Quarter	1	2	3	4	Total
**Jaguars**	9	0	0	6	**15**
Browns	0	0	7	3	**10**

at Huntington Bank Field, Cleveland, Ohio

- Date: December 16, 2000
- Game time: 1:00 p.m. EST
- Game weather: Cloudy, 44 °F (7 °C)
- Game attendance: 72,818
- Referee: Terry McAulay
- TV announcers (CBS): Gus Johnson and Brent Jones
- Recap, Game Book

Game information

**First quarter**

- JAX – Jimmy Smith 4-yard pass from Mark Brunell (kick failed), 6:12. Jaguars 6–0. **Drive: 15 plays, 67 yards, 8:48.**
- JAX – Mike Hollis 43-yard field goal, 3:37. Jaguars 9–0. **Drive: 5 plays, 15 yards, 1:37.**

**Second quarter**

- No scoring plays.

**Third quarter**

- CLE – Anthony Henry 97-yard interception return (Phil Dawson kick), 2:28. Jaguars 9–7.

**Fourth quarter**

- JAX – Mike Hollis 46-yard field goal, 12:20. Jaguars 12–7. **Drive: 10 plays, 36 yards, 5:08.**
- CLE – Phil Dawson 29-yard field goal, 8:09. Jaguars 12–10. **Drive: 4 plays, 2 yards, 2:11.**
- JAX – Mike Hollis 37-yard field goal, 2:57. Jaguars 15–10. **Drive: 14 plays, 47 yards, 5:12.**

Top passers

- JAX – Mark Brunell – 20/35, 202 yards, TD, 2 INT
- CLE – Tim Couch – 21/30, 184 yards, INT

Top rushers

- JAX – Stacey Mack – 28 rushes, 115 yards
- CLE – Jamel White – 9 rushes, 33 yards

Top receivers

- JAX – Keenan McCardell – 7 receptions, 61 yards
- CLE – JaJuan Dawson – receptions, 44 yards

==== Week 15: at Minnesota Vikings ====
Week Fifteen: Jacksonville Jaguars at Minnesota Vikings – Game summary

Quarter	1	2	3	4	Total
**Jaguars**	10	6	7	10	**33**
Vikings	0	3	0	0	**3**

at Hubert H. Humphrey Metrodome, Minneapolis, Minnesota

- Date: December 23, 2000
- Game time: 1:00 p.m. EST
- Game weather: None (indoor stadium)
- Game attendance: 64,150
- Referee: Ron Blum
- TV announcers (CBS): Gus Johnson and Brent Jones
- Recap, Game Book

Game information

**First quarter**

- JAX – Mike Hollis 39-yard field goal, 11:02. Jaguars 3–0. **Drive: 7 plays, 50 yards, 3:58.**
- JAX – Stacey Mack 3-yard run (Mike Hollis kick), 8:42. Jaguars 10–0. **Drive: 5 plays, 56 yards, 1:46.**

**Second quarter**

- JAX – Mike Hollis 23-yard field goal, 11:15. Jaguars 13–0. **Drive: 11 plays, 75 yards, 5:29.**
- JAX – Mike Hollis 21-yard field goal, 4:54. Jaguars 16–0. **Drive: 9 plays, 52 yards, 3:56.**
- MIN – Gary Anderson 32-yard field goal, 0:00. Jaguars 16–3. **Drive: 15 plays, 62 yards, 4:54.**

**Third quarter**

- JAX – Keenan McCardell 10-yard pass from Mark Brunell (Mike Hollis kick), 0:40. Jaguars 23–3. **Drive: 14 plays, 85 yards, 7:46.**

**Fourth quarter**

- JAX – Mike Hollis 21-yard field goal, 12:09. Jaguars 26–3. **Drive: 5 plays, 15 yards, 2:03.**
- JAX – Stacey Mack 2-yard run (Mike Hollis kick), 2:12. Jaguars 33–3. **Drive: 11 plays, 84 yards, 7:07.**

**Top passers**

- JAX – Mark Brunell – 17/24, 217 yards, TD
- MIN – Spergon Wynn – 24/39, 218 yards, INT

**Top rushers**

- JAX – Stacey Mack – 27 rushes, 111 yards, 2 TD
- MIN – Michael Bennett – 11 rushes, 17 yards

**Top receivers**

- JAX – Jimmy Smith – 8 receptions, 122 yards
- MIN – Cris Carter – 7 receptions, 88 yards

==== Week 16: vs. Kansas City Chiefs ====
Week Sixteen: Kansas City Chiefs at Jacksonville Jaguars – Game summary

Quarter	1	2	3	4	Total
**Chiefs**	7	10	10	3	**30**
Jaguars	7	10	0	9	**26**

at Alltel Stadium, Jacksonville, Florida

- Date: December 30, 2000
- Game time: 1:00 p.m. EST
- Game weather: Mostly cloudy, 53 °F (12 °C)
- Game attendance: 59,396
- Referee: Bill Leavy
- TV announcers (CBS): Don Criqui and Steve Tasker
- Recap, Game Book

Game information

**First quarter**

- KC – Priest Holmes 6-yard run (Todd Peterson kick), 12:45. Chiefs 7–0. **Drive: 3 plays, 14 yards, 1:27.**
- JAX – Stacey Mack 3-yard run (Mike Hollis kick), 8:18. Tied 7–7. **Drive: 9 plays, 79 yards, 4:27.**

**Second quarter**

- JAX – Mark Brunell 3-yard run (Mike Hollis kick), 10:36. Jaguars 14–7. **Drive: 7 plays, 69 yards, 3:10.**
- KC – Tony Gonzalez 24-yard pass from Trent Green (Todd Peterson kick), 5:38. Tied 14–14. **Drive: 9 plays, 57 yards, 4:58.**
- JAX – Mike Hollis 28-yard field goal, 2:56. Jaguars 17–14. **Drive: 6 plays, 63 yards, 2:42.**
- KC – Todd Peterson 47-yard field goal, 0:00. Tied 17–17. **Drive: 5 plays, 39 yards, 0:34.**

**Third quarter**

- KC – Todd Peterson 40-yard field goal, 6:31. Chiefs 20–17. **Drive: 11 plays, 59 yards, 5:26.**
- KC – Tony Gonzalez 12-yard pass from Trent Green (Todd Peterson kick), 3:30. Chiefs 27–17. **Drive: 4 plays, 73 yards, 1:58.**

**Fourth quarter**

- JAX – Keenan McCardell 20-yard pass from Mark Brunell (Mike Hollis kick), 13:25. Chiefs 27–24. **Drive: 8 plays, 77 yards, 3:17.**
- KC – Todd Peterson 29-yard field goal, 5:11. Chiefs 30–24. **Drive: 11 plays, 46 yards, 5:59.**
- KC – Dan Stryzinski out of bounds in end zone for a safety, 0:46. Chiefs 30–26.

**Top passers**

- KC – Trent Green – 26/35, 294 yards, 2 TD, 2 INT
- JAX – Mark Brunell – 22/37, 283 yards, TD, INT

**Top rushers**

- KC – Priest Holmes – 27 rushes, 91 yards, TD
- JAX – Stacey Mack – 16 rushes, 125 yards, TD

**Top receivers**

- KC – Eddie Kennison – 6 receptions, 121 yards
- JAX – Keenan McCardell – 7 receptions, 132 yards, TD

==== Week 17: at Chicago Bears ====
Week Seventeen: Cincinnati Bengals at Jacksonville Jaguars – Game summary

Quarter	1	2	3	4	Total
Jaguars	0	0	6	7	**13**
**Bears**	3	10	10	10	**33**

at Soldier Field, Chicago, Illinois

- Date: January 6, 2002
- Game time: 1:00 p.m. EST Original start time on September 16, 2001 4:15 p.m. EST
- Game weather: 37 °F (3 °C)
- Game attendance: 66,944
- Referee: Dick Hantak
- TV announcers (CBS): Dick Enberg, Dan Dierdorf, and Bonnie Bernstein
- Recap, Game Book

Game information

**First quarter**

- CHI – Paul Edinger 47-yard field goal, 2:42. Bears 3–0. **Drive: 8 plays, 35 yards, 3:32.**

**Second quarter**

- CHI – Leon Johnson 2-yard run (Paul Edinger kick), 1:17. Bears 10–0. **Drive: 11 plays, 54 yards, 5:55.**
- CHI – Paul Edinger 23-yard field goal, 0:00. Bears 13–0. **Drive: 8 plays, 38 yards, 1:02.**

**Third quarter**

- CHI – David Terrell 9-yard pass from Jim Miller (Paul Edinger kick), 9:40. Bears 20–0. **Drive: 2 plays, 9 yards, 0:43.**
- JAX – Keenan McCardell 15-yard pass from Mark Brunell (kick failed), 6:59. Bears 20–6. **Drive: 7 plays, 70 yards, 2:41.**
- CHI – Paul Edinger 25-yard field goal, 1:52. Bears 23–6. **Drive: 9 plays, 59 yards, 5:07.**

**Fourth quarter**

- CHI – Paul Edinger 22-yard field goal, 12:56. Bears 26–6. **Drive: 6 plays, 21 yards, 3:34.**
- CHI – Anthony Thomas 2-yard run (Paul Edinger kick), 7:37. Bears 33–6. **Drive: 7 plays, 40 yards, 4:05.**
- JAX – Jimmy Smith 3-yard pass from Mark Brunell (Jaret Holmes kick), 3:50. Bears 33–13. **Drive: 8 plays, 73 yards, 3:47.**

Top passers

- JAX – Mark Brunell – 19/36, 189 yards, 2 TD, 3 INT
- CHI – Jim Miller – 19/28, 159 yards, TD

Top rushers

- JAX – Stacey Mack – 11 rushes, 66 yards
- CHI – Anthony Thomas – 33 rushes, 160 yards, TD

Top receivers

- JAX – Keenan McCardell – 9 receptions, 93 yards, TD
- CHI – D'Wayne Bates – 4 receptions, 50 yards

=== Standings ===
AFC Central
	W	L	T	PCT	PF	PA	STK
^{(1)} Pittsburgh Steelers	13	3	0	.813	352	212	W1
^{(5)} Baltimore Ravens	10	6	0	.625	303	265	W1
Cleveland Browns	7	9	0	.438	285	319	L1
Tennessee Titans	7	9	0	.438	336	388	L2
Jacksonville Jaguars	6	10	0	.375	294	286	L2
Cincinnati Bengals	6	10	0	.375	226	309	W2
