= 2002 Jacksonville Jaguars season =

8th season in franchise history

- Owner: Wayne Weaver
- Head coach: Tom Coughlin
- Defensive coordinator: John Pease
- Home stadium: Alltel Stadium

Results
- Record: 6–10
- Division place: 3rd AFC South
- Playoffs: Did not qualify
- Pro Bowlers: P Chris Hanson

Uniform

The 2002 season was the Jacksonville Jaguars' 8th in the National Football League and their eighth and final under head coach Tom Coughlin. The team matched their 2001 record of 6–10 and finished 3rd place in the AFC South, missing the playoffs for the third season in a row. This was Mark Brunell's final full season as the Jaguars' starting quarterback. Tom Coughlin was fired after this season and replaced by Jack Del Rio the following season.

== Offseason ==
Additions	Subtractions
DE Marco Coleman (Redskins)	CB Aaron Beasley (Jets)
G Chris Naeole (Saints)	WR Sean Dawkins (Vikings)
TE Pete Mitchell (Lions)	LB Kevin Hardy (Cowboys)
DE Stalin Colinet (Vikings)	K Mike Hollis (Bills)
WR Bobby Shaw (Steelers)	WR Keenan McCardell (Buccaneers)
T Daryl Terrell (Saints)	LB Hardy Nickerson (Packers)
	LB Jeff Posey (Texans)
	QB Jonathan Quinn (Chiefs)
	C Jeff Smith (Titans)
	DE Renaldo Wynn (Redskins)

=== 2002 expansion draft ===
Jacksonville Jaguars selected during the expansion draft
Round	Overall	Name	Position	Expansion team
——	1	Tony Boselli	Tackle	Houston Texans
——	4	Gary Walker	Defensive tackle	Houston Texans
——	8	Seth Payne	Defensive tackle	Houston Texans

=== NFL draft ===
2002 Jacksonville Jaguars draft
Round	Pick	Player	Position	College	Notes
1	9	John Henderson *	Defensive tackle	Tennessee	
2	40	Mike Pearson	Offensive tackle	Florida	
3	89	Akin Ayodele	Linebacker	Purdue	
4	108	David Garrard *	Quarterback	East Carolina	
4	118	Chris Luzar	Tight end	Virginia	
6	180	Clenton Ballard	Defensive tackle	Southwest Texas State	
7	222	Kendall Newson	Wide receiver	Middle Tenn. State	
7	246	Steve Smith	Cornerback	Oregon	
7	235	Hayden Epstein	Kicker	Michigan	
Made roster † Pro Football Hall of Fame * Made at least one Pro Bowl during career

=== Undrafted free agents ===
2002 undrafted free agents of note
Player	Position	College
Bruce Branch	Cornerback	Penn State
Chrys Bullock	Guard/Offensive tackle	Tulane
Jovon Bush	Defensive tackle	Clemson
Jermaine Chatman	Cornerback	Arizona
Victor Ellis	Linebacker	Alabama
Quinn Gray	Quarterback	Florida A&M
Javor Mills	Defensive end	Auburn
Corey Parchman	Wide receiver	Ball State
Ellis Spears	Wide receiver	Grambling State
Adam Tate	Running back	Utah

== Staff ==
2002 Jacksonville Jaguars staff
Front office: Chairman/chief executive officer – Wayne Weaver; Director of pro scouting – Fran Foley; Head coaches: Head coach – Tom Coughlin; Offensive coaches: Quarterbacks – John Hufnagel; Running backs – Jerald Ingram; Wide receivers – John McNulty; Tight ends – Tony Sparano; Offensive line – Mike Maser; Offensive quality control – Ty Knott	Defensive coaches: Assistant head coach/defensive coordinator – John Pease; Defensive line – Lucious Selmon; Linebackers – Steve Szabo; Defensive backs – Perry Fewell; Defensive quality control – Mike Sullivan; Special teams coaches: Special teams coordinator – John Bonamego; Assistant special teams – Mike Priefer; Strength and conditioning: Strength and conditioning – Jerry Palmieri; Assistant strength and conditioning – Greg Finnegan

== Final roster ==
2002 Jacksonville Jaguars roster
Quarterbacks (QB): 8 Mark Brunell; 9 David Garrard; 10 Kent Graham; Running backs (RB): 38 Dan Alexander; 35 Elvis Joseph KR; 34 Stacey Mack KR; 28 Fred Taylor; Wide receivers (WR): 84 Patrick Johnson; 85 Kevin Lockett; 87 Jimmy Redmond; 86 Micah Ross; 81 Bobby Shaw PR; 82 Jimmy Smith; Tight ends (TE): 80 Kyle Brady; 89 Chris Luzar; 83 Pete Mitchell	Offensive linemen (OL): 78 Todd Fordham T; 68 Drew Inzer G; 76 Leander Jordan G/T; 73 Dave Kadela T; 63 Brad Meester G; 65 Chris Naeole G; 72 Mike Pearson T; 67 Daryl Terrell G/T; 66 John Wade C; Defensive linemen (DL): 61 Clenton Ballard DT; 91 Marco Coleman DE; 96 Chris Combs DE; 98 John Henderson DT; 70 Javor Mills DE; 92 Rob Meier DE; 94 Larry Smith DT; 95 Paul Spicer DE; 99 Marcus Stroud DT	Linebackers (LB): 51 Akin Ayodele OLB; 56 Bobby Brooks OLB; 55 Danny Clark OLB; 58 Wali Rainer MLB; 53 T. J. Slaughter OLB; 57 Joe Tuipala MLB; 52 Eric Westmoreland OLB; Defensive backs (DB): 26 Ainsley Battles SS; 42 James Boyd FS; 25 Fernando Bryant CB; 23 Ike Charlton CB/KR; 29 Jason Craft CB; 20 Donovin Darius SS; 32 Marlon McCree FS; 21 Steve Smith CB; 41 Kiwaukee Thomas CB; Special teams (ST): 5 Danny Boyd K; 2 Chris Hanson P; 88 Joe Zelenka LS	Practice squad: 34 David Allen RB; -- Mark Bristol T; 17 Henry Douglas WR (IR); -- Jason Olford CB; 11 Corey Parchman WR; -- Duke Pettijohn DE; Reserve: 22 Robert Bean CB (IR); 90 Tony Brackens DE (IR); 73 Derrick Chambers T (IR); 64 Aaron Koch G (IR); 31 Patrick Washington FB (IR); 77 Zach Wiegert T (IR); 74 Maurice Williams T (IR); 79 Chris Ziemann T (IR); Rookies in italics 53 active, 9 reserve, 5 practice squad

== Preseason ==
Week	Date	Opponent	Result	Record	Venue
1	August 9	at Atlanta Falcons	L 13–23	0–1	Georgia Dome
2	August 16	Tampa Bay Buccaneers	L 0–20	1–2	Alltel Stadium
3	August 23	at Chicago Bears	W 24–16	1–2	Memorial Stadium
4	August 29	Dallas Cowboys	L 28–25	2–2	Alltel Stadium

== Regular season ==
=== Schedule ===
Week	Date	Opponent	Result	Record	Venue	Attendance
1	September 8	**Indianapolis Colts**	**L** 25–28	0–1	Alltel Stadium	56,595
2	September 15	at Kansas City Chiefs	**W** 23–16	1–1	Arrowhead Stadium	77,934
3	Bye					
4	September 29	New York Jets	**W** 28–3	2–1	Alltel Stadium	55,670
5	October 6	Philadelphia Eagles	**W** 28–25	3–1	Alltel Stadium	65,005
6	October 13	at **Tennessee Titans**	**L** 14–23	3–2	The Coliseum	68,804
7	October 20	at Baltimore Ravens	**L** 10–17	3–3	Ravens Stadium	69,173
8	October 27	**Houston Texans**	**L** 19–21	3–4	Alltel Stadium	53,721
9	November 3	at New York Giants	**L** 17–24	3–5	Giants Stadium	78,337
10	November 10	Washington Redskins	**W** 26–7	4–5	Alltel Stadium	66,665
11	November 17	at **Houston Texans**	**W** 24–21	5–5	Reliant Stadium	69,711
12	November 24	at Dallas Cowboys	**L** 19–21	5–6	Texas Stadium	62,204
13	December 1	Pittsburgh Steelers	**L** 23–25	5–7	Alltel Stadium	55,260
14	December 8	Cleveland Browns	**L** 20–21	5–8	Alltel Stadium	46,267
15	December 15	at Cincinnati Bengals	**W** 29–15	6–8	Paul Brown Stadium	42,092
16	December 22	**Tennessee Titans**	**L** 10–28	6–9	Alltel Stadium	51,033
17	December 29	at **Indianapolis Colts**	**L** 13–20	6–10	RCA Dome	56,755

Note: Intra-division opponents are in bold text.

=== Game summaries ===
==== Week 1: vs. Indianapolis Colts ====
Week One: Indianapolis Colts at Jacksonville Jaguars – Game summary

Quarter	1	2	3	4	Total
**Colts**	7	7	7	7	**28**
Jaguars	0	7	10	8	**25**

at Alltel Stadium, Jacksonville, Florida

- Game time: 1:00 p.m. EST
- Game weather: 85 °F (29 °C)
- Game attendance: 56,595
- Referee: Bernie Kukar
- TV announcers (CBS): Kevin Harlan, Randy Cross, and Beasley Reece
- Recap, Game Book

Game information

**First quarter**

- IND – Qadry Ismail 6-yard pass from Peyton Manning (Mike Vanderjagt kick), 2:38. Colts 7–0. **Drive: 15 plays, 96 yards, 7:02.**

**Second quarter**

- JAX – Pete Mitchell 8-yard pass from Mark Brunell (Hayden Epstein kick), 7:34. Tied 7–7. **Drive: 17 plays, 81 yards, 10:04.**
- IND – Marcus Washington 40-yard interception return (Mike Vanderjagt kick), 0:33. Colts 14–7.

**Third quarter**

- JAX – Hayden Epstein 27-yard field goal, 7:39. Colts 14–10. **Drive: 4 plays, 5 yards, 1:56.**
- JAX – Patrick Johnson 18-yard pass from Mark Brunell (Hayden Epstein kick), 5:20. Jaguars 17–14. **Drive: 3 plays, 25 yards, 1:30.**
- IND – Qadry Ismail 12-yard pass from Peyton Manning (Mike Vanderjagt kick), 2:57. Colts 21–17. **Drive: 3 plays, 19 yards, 0:53.**

**Fourth quarter**

- IND – Marvin Harrison 3-yard pass from Peyton Manning (Mike Vanderjagt kick), 11:26. Colts 28–17. **Drive: 11 plays, 48 yards, 4:58.**
- JAX – Fred Taylor 6-yard run (pass succeeded), 4:11. Colts 28–25. **Drive: 15 plays, 75 yards, 7:15.**

**Top passers**

- IND – Peyton Manning – 19/31, 211 yards, 3 TD
- JAX – Mark Brunell – 22/36, 228 yards, 2 TD, INT

**Top rushers**

- IND – Edgerrin James – 26 rushes, 99 yards
- JAX – Fred Taylor – 24 rushes, 83 yards, TD

**Top receivers**

- IND – Qadry Ismail – 6 receptions, 84 yards
- JAX – Jimmy Smith – 8 receptions, 104 yards

The Colts and Jaguars faced off for the first time as divisional rivals in their season opener on September 8 in Jacksonville. The Colts initiated the scoring with a touchdown in the first quarter, the Jaguars tied the scores in the second quarter with an 8–yard touchdown pass from Mark Brunell to tight end Pete Mitchell. In the final minutes of the second quarter, Mark Brunell was intercepted by Colts linebacker Marcus Washington who returned the ball 40 yards for a touchdown. The Jaguars missed a 52–yard field goal attempt, resulting in a halftime score of 14–7 in favor of the Colts. In the third quarter, a fumble by Colts running back Edgerrin James led to a Jaguars field goal, followed by another fumble from Colts tight end Marcus Pollard that led to a Jaguars touchdown, giving them the lead. After the Jaguars forced a Colts three–and–out, return specialist Damon Gibson mishandled the catch, allowing Colts defender Clifton Crosby to recover the ball at Jacksonville's 19–yard line, the Colts capitalized on this opportunity, scoring a touchdown to regain the lead. Gibson was released after the game eventually signing with the Atlanta Falcons in Week 3, Bobby Shaw would take his place the remainder of the year. In the fourth quarter, the Colts added another touchdown to widen their advantage. The Jaguars mounted a lengthy drive, scoring a touchdown and converting a two–point attempt to narrow the Colts' lead to just three points with a little over four minutes remaining. On the ensuing drive The Colts managed to hold the ball for three minutes and forced the Jaguars to use all three of their time-outs, leaving them with the ball and about a minute remaining. The Jaguars advanced to the Colts' 46–yard line but ultimately ran out of time, resulting in a 28–25 victory for the Colts.

==== Week 2: at Kansas City Chiefs ====
Week Two: Jacksonville Jaguars at Kansas City Chiefs – Game summary

Quarter	1	2	3	4	Total
**Jaguars**	0	9	0	14	**23**
Chiefs	3	3	0	10	**16**

at Arrowhead Stadium, Kansas City, Missouri

- Date: September 15, 2002
- Game time: 12:00 p.m. CDT
- Game weather: Clear, 66 °F (19 °C)
- Game attendance: 77,934
- Referee: Tom White
- TV announcers (CBS): Don Criqui and Steve Tasker
- Recap, Game Book

Game information

**First quarter**

- KC – Morten Andersen 25-yard field goal, 2:49. Chiefs 3–0. **Drive: 15 plays, 88 yards, 8:38.**

**Second quarter**

- KC – Morten Andersen 38-yard field goal, 11:28. Chiefs 6–0. **Drive: 11 plays, 51 yards, 4:25.**
- JAX – Jimmy Smith 37-yard pass from Mark Brunell (kick aborted), 2:42. Tied 6–6. **Drive: 7 plays, 56 yards, 3:29.**
- JAX – Hayden Epstein 26-yard field goal, 0:00. Jaguars 9–6. **Drive: 11 plays, 46 yards, 1:45.**

**Third quarter**

- No scoring plays.

**Fourth quarter**

- KC – Morten Andersen 39-yard field goal, 6:57. Tied 9–9. **Drive: 8 plays, 34 yards, 2:53.**
- JAX – Patrick Johnson 79-yard pass from Mark Brunell (Hayden Epstein kick), 5:59. Jaguars 16–9. **Drive: 2 plays, 85 yards, 0:58.**
- JAX – Fred Taylor 63-yard run (Hayden Epstein kick), 3:09. Jaguars 23–9. **Drive: 1 play, 63 yards, 0:11.**
- KC – Tony Gonzalez 12-yard pass from Trent Green (Morten Andersen kick), 2:35. Jaguars 23–16. **Drive: 4 plays, 80 yards, 0:34.**

**Top passers**

- JAX – Mark Brunell – 25/36, 320 yards, 2 TD
- KC – Trent Green – 16/31, 199 yards, TD, 2 INT

**Top rushers**

- JAX – Fred Taylor – 20 rushes, 114 yards, TD
- KC – Priest Holmes – 22 rushes, 84 yards

**Top receivers**

- JAX – Patrick Johnson – 4 receptions, 97 yards, TD
- KC – Marc Boerigter – 1 reception, 51 yards

==== Week 4: vs. New York Jets ====
Week Four: New York Jets at Jacksonville Jaguars – Game summary

Quarter	1	2	3	4	Total
Jets	0	3	0	0	**3**
**Jaguars**	7	7	14	0	**28**

at Alltel Stadium, Jacksonville, Florida

- Date: September 29, 2002
- Game time: 1:00 p.m. EDT
- Game weather: 87 °F (31 °C)
- Game attendance: 55,670
- Referee: Walt Coleman
- TV announcers (CBS): Ian Eagle and Solomon Wilcots
- Recap, Game Book

Game information

**First quarter**

- JAX – Stacey Mack 1-yard run (Hayden Epstein kick), 13:34. Jaguars 7–0. **Drive: 2 plays, 73 yards, 0:59.**

**Second quarter**

- JAX – Stacey Mack 1-yard run (Hayden Epstein kick), 7:55. Jaguars 14–0. **Drive: 7 plays, 52 yards, 4:11.**
- NYJ – John Hall 46-yard field goal, 5:59. Jaguars 14–3. **Drive: 6 plays, 39 yards, 1:52.**

**Third quarter**

- JAX – Stacey Mack 8-yard run (Hayden Epstein kick), 10:40. Jaguars 21–3. **Drive: 4 plays, 46 yards, 2:13.**
- JAX – Fred Taylor 22-yard run (Hayden Epstein kick), 0:48. Jaguars 28–3. **Drive: 7 plays, 56 yards, 4:18.**

**Fourth quarter**

- No scoring plays.

**Top passers**

- NYJ – Chad Pennington – 21/34, 281 yards, INT
- JAX – Mark Brunell – 10/15, 173 yards

**Top rushers**

- NYJ – Curtis Martin – 8 rushes, 44 yards
- JAX – Fred Taylor – 21 rushes, 142 yards, TD

**Top receivers**

- NYJ – Laveranues Coles – 8 receptions, 97 yards
- JAX – Jimmy Smith – 3 receptions, 95 yards

==== Week 5: vs. Philadelphia Eagles ====
Week Five: Philadelphia Eagles at Jacksonville Jaguars – Game summary

Quarter	1	2	3	4	Total
Eagles	0	7	3	15	**25**
**Jaguars**	3	11	0	14	**28**

at Alltel Stadium, Jacksonville, Florida

- Date: October 6, 2002
- Game time: 4:15 p.m. EDT
- Game weather: 87 °F (31 °C)
- Game attendance: 65,005
- Referee: Gerry Austin
- TV announcers (FOX): Sam Rosen, Bill Maas, and Ryan Elijah
- Recap, Game Book

Game information

**First quarter**

- JAX – Hayden Epstein 34-yard field goal, 8:50. Jaguars 3–0. **Drive: 8 plays, 40 yards, 3:48.**

**Second quarter**

- JAX – Hayden Epstein 31-yard field goal, 14:50. Jaguars 6–0. **Drive: 9 plays, 55 yards, 3:53.**
- PHI – Chad Lewis 4-yard pass from Donovan McNabb (David Akers kick), 3:41. Eagles 7–6. **Drive: 9 plays, 63 yards, 4:38.**
- JAX – Kyle Brady 2-yard pass from Mark Brunell (pass succeeded), 1:15. Jaguars 14–7. **Drive: 7 plays, 60 yards, 2:26.**

**Third quarter**

- PHI – David Akers 31-yard field goal, 7:49. Jaguars 14–10. **Drive: 6 plays, 30 yards, 2:21.**

**Fourth quarter**

- JAX – Stacey Mack 1-yard run (Hayden Epstein kick), 10:37. Jaguars 21–10. **Drive: 11 plays, 79 yards, 6:03.**
- JAX – Bobby Shaw 69-yard punt return (Hayden Epstein kick), 6:23. Jaguars 28–10.
- PHI – Donovan McNabb 4-yard run (run succeeded), 2:48. Jaguars 28–18. **Drive: 11 plays, 75 yards, 3:35.**
- PHI – Antonio Freeman 8-yard pass from Donovan McNabb (David Akers kick), 0:00. Jaguars 28–25. **Drive: 14 plays, 82 yards, 2:20.**

**Top passers**

- PHI – Donovan McNabb – 28/48, 230 yards, 2 TD
- JAX – Mark Brunell – 13/23, 197 yards, TD

**Top rushers**

- PHI – Donovan McNabb – 12 rushes, 100 yards, TD
- JAX – Fred Taylor – 21 rushes, 48 yards

**Top receivers**

- PHI – James Thrash – 5 receptions, 68 yards
- JAX – Jimmy Smith – 4 receptions, 91 yards

==== Week 6: at Tennessee Titans ====
Week Six: Jacksonville Jaguars at Tennessee Titans – Game summary

Quarter	1	2	3	4	Total
Jaguars	0	7	7	0	**14**
**Titans**	7	9	0	7	**23**

at The Coliseum, Nashville, Tennessee

- Date: October 18, 2002
- Game time: 4:15 p.m. EST
- Game weather: Cool & sunny, 65 °F (18 °C)
- Game attendance: 68,804
- Referee: Jeff Triplette
- TV announcers (CBS): Ian Eagle, and Solomon Wilcots
- Recap, Game Book

Game information

**First quarter**

- TEN – Eddie George 8-yard pass from Steve McNair (Joe Nedney kick), 4:30. Titans 7–0. **Drive: 10 plays, 80 yards, 5:53.**

**Second quarter**

- TEN – Joe Nedney 40-yard field goal, 12:49. Titans 10–0. **Drive: 10 plays, 37 yards, 4:40.**
- TEN – Joe Nedney 26-yard field goal, 10:36. Titans 13–0. **Drive: 4 plays, 8 yards, 1:21.**
- JAX – David Garrard 4-yard run (Hayden Epstein kick), 3:53. Titans 13–7. **Drive: 6 plays, 20 yards, 3:19.**
- TEN – Joe Nedney 33-yard field goal, 0:13. Titans 16–7. **Drive: 14 plays, 57 yards, 3:40.**

**Third quarter**

- JAX – David Garrard 41-yard run (Hayden Epstein kick), 0:53. Titans 16–14. **Drive: 3 plays, 82 yards, 1:55.**

**Fourth quarter**

- TEN – Eddie George 1-yard run (Joe Nedney kick), 8:07. Titans 23–14. **Drive: 14 plays, 68 yards, 7:46.**

**Top passers**

- JAX – David Garrard – 4/7, 53 yards, 2 INT
- TEN – Steve McNair – 26/36, 226 yards, TD

**Top rushers**

- JAX – David Garrard – 7 rushes, 71 yards, 2 TD
- TEN – Eddie George – 31 rushes, 113 yards, TD

**Top receivers**

- JAX – Jimmy Smith – 4 receptions, 49 yards
- TEN – Drew Bennett – 6 receptions, 68 yards

==== Week 7: at Baltimore Ravens ====
Week Seven: Jacksonville Jaguars at Baltimore Ravens – Game summary

Quarter	1	2	3	4	Total
Jaguars	0	7	0	3	**10**
**Ravens**	0	7	10	0	**17**

at Ravens Stadium, Baltimore, Maryland

- Date: October 20, 2002
- Game time: 1:00 p.m. EST
- Game weather: Rain likely, 56 °F (13 °C)
- Game attendance: 69,173
- Referee: Rob McElwee
- TV announcers (CBS): Ian Eagle and Solomon Wilcots
- Recap, Game Book

Game information

**First quarter**

- No scoring plays.

**Second quarter**

- BAL – Todd Heap 1-yard pass from Chris Redman (Matt Stover kick), 13:03. Ravens 7–0. **Drive: 5 plays, 19 yards, 2:08.**
- JAX – Fred Taylor 9-yard run (pass succeeded), 5:45. Tied 7–7. **Drive: 4 plays, 25 yards, 2:12.**

**Third quarter**

- BAL – Matt Stover 30-yard field goal, 9:16. Ravens 10–7. **Drive: 6 plays, 10 yards, 2:19.**
- BAL – Todd Heap 20-yard pass from Chris Redman (Mat Stover kick), 0:41. Ravens 17–7. **Drive: 7 plays, 80 yards, 3:21.**

**Fourth quarter**

- JAX – Hayden Epstein 22-yard field goal, 2:30. Ravens 17–10. **Drive: 17 plays, 89 yards, 4:36.**

**Top passers**

- JAX – Mark Brunell – 24/46, 231 yards, 3 INT
- BAL – Chris Redman – 14/28, 152 yards, 2 TD

**Top rushers**

- JAX – Fred Taylor – 25 rushes, 151 yards, TD
- BAL – Jamal Lewis – 28 rushes, 119 yards

**Top receivers**

- JAX – Jimmy Smith – 7 receptions, 63 yards
- BAL – Travis Taylor – 4 receptions, 42 yards

==== Week 8: vs. Houston Texans ====
Week Eight: Houston Texans at Jacksonville Jaguars – Game summary

Quarter	1	2	3	4	Total
**Texans**	0	7	3	11	**21**
Jaguars	0	9	3	7	**19**

at Alltel Stadium, Jacksonville, Florida

- Date: October 27, 2002
- Game time: 4:15 p.m. EST
- Game weather: 78 °F (26 °C)
- Game attendance: 53,721
- Referee: Walt Coleman
- TV announcers (CBS): Ian Eagle and Solomon Wilcots
- Recap, Game Book

Game information

**First quarter**

- No scoring plays

**Second quarter**

- JAX – Jimmy Smith 25-yard pass from Mark Brunell (Tim Seder kick), 12:11. Jaguars 7–0. **Drive: 7 plays, 74 yards, 2:39.**
- HOU – Jonathan Wells 3-yard run (Kris Brown kick), 8:31. Tied 7–7. **Drive: 4 plays, 44 yards, 2:08.**
- JAX – Chad Stanley tackled in end zone, 5:15. Jaguars 9–7.

**Third quarter**

- HOU – Kris Brown 43-yard field goal, 11:55. Texans 10–9. **Drive: 6 plays, 46 yards, 3:39.**
- JAX – Tim Seder 34-yard field goal, 6:31. Jaguars 12–10. **Drive: 4 plays, 7 yards, 0:43.**

**Fourth quarter**

- HOU – Billy Miller 1-yard pass from David Carr (Carr pass to Gaffney), 18–12. **Drive: 10 plays, 80 yards, 4:12.**
- JAX – Stacey Mack 2-yard run (Tim Seder kick), 7:58. Jaguars 19–18. **Drive: 7 plays, 70 yards, 3:22.**
- HOU – Kris Brown 45-yard field goal, 2:24. Texans 21–19. **Drive: 4 plays, 50 yards, 0:28.**

**Top passers**

- HOU – David Carr – 11/18, 184 yards, TD
- JAX – Mark Brunell – 16/34, 202 yards, TD

**Top rushers**

- HOU – James Allen – 10 rushes, 40 yards
- JAX – Fred Taylor – 25 rushes, 85 yards

**Top receivers**

- HOU – Billy Miller – 3 receptions, 78 yards, TD
- JAX – Jimmy Smith – 4 receptions, 80 yards, TD

==== Week 9: at New York Giants ====
Week Nine: Jacksonville Jaguars at New York Giants – game summary

Quarter	1	2	3	4	Total
Jaguars	0	0	3	14	**17**
**Giants**	7	7	10	0	**24**

at Giants Stadium, East Rutherford, New Jersey

- Date: November 3, 2002
- Game time: 8:30 p.m. EST
- Game weather: Cloudy, 43 °F (6 °C)
- Game attendance: 78,337
- Referee: Johnny Grier
- TV announcers (ESPN): Mike Patrick, Joe Theismann, Paul Maguire, and Suzy Kolber

Game information

**First quarter**

- NYG – Tiki Barber 2-yard run (Matt Bryant kick), 10:54. Giants 7–0. **Drive: 7 plays, 56 yards, 2:39.**

**Second quarter**

- NYG – Ron Dixon 8-yard pass from Kerry Collins (Matt Bryant kick), 0:09. Giants 14–0. **Drive: 11 plays, 68 yards, 4:12.**

**Third quarter**

- NYG – Matt Bryant 27-yard field goal, 11:54. Giants 17–0. **Drive: 8 plays, 58 yards, 3:06.**
- NYG – Tiki Barber 44-yard run (Matt Bryant kick), 7:18. Giants 24–0. **Drive: 2 plays, 53 yards, 0:46.**
- JAX – Tim Seder 24-yard field goal, 3:16. Giants 24–3. **Drive: 8 plays, 61 yards, 4:02.**

**Fourth quarter**

- JAX – Bobby Shaw 14-yard pass from Mark Brunell (Tim Seder kick), 5:20. Giants 24–10. **Drive: 15 plays, 67 yards, 7:41.**
- JAX – Jimmy Smith 9-yard pass from Mark Brunell (Tim Seder kick), 1:47. Giants 24–17. **Drive: 8 plays, 80 yards, 2:24.**

**Top passers**

- JAX – Mark Brunell – 23/38, 230 yards, 2 TD
- NYG – Kerry Collins – 20/28, 228 yards, TD

**Top rushers**

- JAX – Mark Brunell – 5 rushes, 63 yards, TD
- NYG – Tiki Barber – 19 rushes, 101 yards, 2 TD

**Top receivers**

- JAX – Jimmy Smith – 10 receptions, 123 yards, TD
- NYG – Tiki Barber – 4 receptions, 62 yards

==== Week 10: vs. Washington Redskins ====
Week Ten: Washington Redskins at Jacksonville Jaguars – Game summary

Quarter	1	2	3	4	Total
Redskins	7	0	0	0	**7**
**Jaguars**	0	10	13	3	**26**

at Alltel Stadium, Jacksonville, Florida

- Date: November 10, 2002
- Game time: 4:05 p.m. EST
- Game weather: 82 °F (28 °C)
- Game attendance: 66,665
- Referee: Bill Carollo
- TV announcers (FOX): Pat Summerall, Brian Baldinger
- Recap, Game Book

Game information

**First quarter**

- WSH – Rod Gardner 20-yard pass from Shane Matthews (James Tuthill kick), 10:37. Redskins 7–0. **Drive: 9 plays, 77 yards, 4:23.**

**Second quarter**

- JAX – Stacey Mack 2-yard run (Tim Seder kick), 9:11. Tied 7–7. **Drive: 3 plays, 21 yards, 1:25.**
- JAX – Tim Seder 27-yard field goal, 0:08. Jaguars 10–7. **Drive: 8 plays, 25 yards, 1:20.**

**Third quarter**

- JAX – Tim Seder 43-yard field goal, 8:50. Jaguars 13–7. **Drive: 6 plays, 23 yards, 2:15.**
- JAX – Tim Seder 27-yard field goal, 2:30. Jaguars 16–7. **Drive: 7 plays, 51 yards, 4:00.**
- JAX – Fred Taylor 12-yard run (Tim Seder kick), 0:18. Jaguars 23–7. **Drive: 4 plays, 64 yards, 1:41.**

**Fourth quarter**

- JAX – Tim Seder 42-yard field goal, 8:50. Jaguars 26–7. **Drive: 7 plays, 48 yards, 3:47.**

**Top passers**

- WSH – Shane Matthews – 27/50, 256 yards, TD, 2 INT
- JAX – Mark Brunell – 19/29, 194 yards

**Top rushers**

- WSH – Kenny Watson – 14 rushes, 52 yards
- JAX – Fred Taylor – 21 rushes, 82 yards, TD

**Top receivers**

- WSH – Rod Gardner – 7 receptions, 100 yards, TD
- JAX – Bobby Shaw – 3 receptions, 69 yards

==== Week 11: at Houston Texans ====
Week Eleven: Jacksonville Jaguars at Houston Texans – Game summary

Quarter	1	2	3	4	Total
**Jaguars**	7	10	7	0	**24**
Texans	0	7	7	7	**21**

at Reliant Stadium, Houston, Texas

- Date: November 17, 2002
- Game time: 12:00 p.m. CST
- Game weather: Clear, 66 °F (19 °C)
- Game attendance: 69,711
- Referee: Dick Hantak
- TV announcers (CBS): Don Criqui and Steve Tasker
- Recap, Game Book

Game information

**First quarter**

- JAX – Stacey Mack 1-yard run (Tim Seder kick), 1:19. Jaguars 7–0. **Drive: 4 plays, 2 yards, 0:45.**

**Second quarter**

- JAX – Kyle Brady 2-yard pass from Mark Brunell (Tim Seder kick), 10:20. Jaguars 14–0. **Drive: 6 plays, 96 yards, 1:44.**
- HOU – Corey Bradford 52-yard pass from David Carr (Kris Brown kick), 3:56. Jaguars 14–7. **Drive: 5 plays, 72 yards, 2:37.**
- JAX – Tim Seder 22-yard field goal, 0:00. Jaguars 17–7. **Drive: 6 plays, 26 yards, 1:55.**

**Third quarter**

- JAX – Jimmy Smith 13-yard pass from Mark Brunell (Tim Seder kick), 12:50. Jaguars 24–7. **Drive: 2 plays, 27 yards, 0:15.**
- HOU – David Carr 2-yard run (Kris Brown kick), 1:25. Jaguars 24–14. **Drive: 9 plays, 83 yards, 4:12.**

**Fourth quarter**

- HOU – David Carr 14-yard run (Kris Brown kick), 2:04. Jaguars 24–21. **Drive: 13 plays, 79 yards, 5:14.**

**Top passers**

- JAX – Mark Brunell – 15/25, 224 yards, 2 TD, INT
- HOU – David Carr – 22/30, 228 yards, TD, INT

**Top rushers**

- JAX – Fred Taylor – 13 rushes, 56 yards
- HOU – David Carr – 7 rushes, 33 yards, 2 TD

**Top receivers**

- JAX – Jimmy Smith – 6 receptions, 70 yards, TD
- HOU – Corey Bradford – 5 receptions, 73 yards, TD

==== Week 12: at Dallas Cowboys ====
Week Twelve: Jacksonville Jaguars at Dallas Cowboys – Game summary

Quarter	1	2	3	4	Total
Jaguars	0	5	0	14	**19**
**Cowboys**	0	7	7	7	**21**

at Texas Stadium, Irving, Texas

- Date: November 24, 2002
- Game time: 12:00 p.m. CST
- Game weather: Partly cloudy skies, 63 °F (17 °C)
- Game attendance: 62,204
- Referee: Larry Nemmers
- TV announcers (CBS): Don Criqui and Steve Tasker
- Recap, Game Book

Game information

**First quarter**

- No scoring plays.

**Second quarter**

- JAX – Ross Tucker tackled in the end zone by Rob Meier for a safety, 10:18. Jaguars 2–0.
- DAL – Joey Galloway 43-yard pass from Chad Hutchinson (Billy Cundiff kick), 2:17. Cowboys 7–2. **Drive: 4 plays, 69 yards, 2:12.**
- JAX – Tim Seder 31-yard field goal, 0:00. Cowboys 7–5. **Drive: 10 plays, 65 yards, 2:17.**

**Third quarter**

- DAL – Emmitt Smith 1-yard run (Billy Cundiff kick), 4:15. Cowboys 14–5. **Drive: 13 plays, 99 yards, 7:05.**

**Fourth quarter**

- JAX – Stacey Mack 3-yard run (Tim Seder kick), 14:16. Cowboys 14–12. **Drive: 8 plays, 38 yards, 3:36.**
- DAL – Joey Galloway 11-yard pass from Chad Hutchinson (Billy Cundiff kick), 11:09. Cowboys 21–12. **Drive: 6 plays, 65 yards, 3:07.**
- JAX – Kevin Lockett 8-yard pass from Mark Brunell (Tim Seder kick), 1:54. Cowboys 21–19. **Drive: 9 plays, 70 yards, 1:44.**

Top passers

- JAX – Mark Brunell – 22/40, 202 yards, TD, INT
- DAL – Chad Hutchinson – 16/24, 301 yards, 2 TD, 2 INT

Top rushers

- JAX – Fred Taylor – 20 rushes, 100 yards
- DAL – Emmitt Smith – 20 rushes, 73 yards, 1 TD

Top receivers

- JAX – Jimmy Smith – 13 receptions, 90 yards
- DAL – Joey Galloway – 9 receptions, 144 yards, 2 TD

==== Week 13: vs. Pittsburgh Steelers ====
Week Thirteen: Pittsburgh Steelers at Jacksonville Jaguars – Game summary

Quarter	1	2	3	4	Total
**Steelers**	6	10	3	6	**25**
Jaguars	7	3	0	13	**23**

at Alltel Stadium, Jacksonville, Florida

- Date: December 1, 2002
- Game time: 1:05 p.m. EST
- Game weather: 53 °F (12 °C)
- Game attendance: 55,260
- Referee: Gerry Austin
- TV announcers (CBS): Gus Johnson and Brent Jones
- Recap, Game Book

Game information

**First quarter**

- PIT – Jeff Reed 25-yard field goal, 12:42. Steelers 3–0. **Drive: 6 plays, 61 yards, 2:18.**
- PIT – Jeff Reed 29-yard field goal, 5:17. Steelers 6–0. **Drive: 12 plays, 55 yards, 6:25.**
- JAX – Fred Taylor 18-yard run (Richie Cunningham kick), 2:28. Jaguars 7–6. **Drive: 5 plays, 46 yards, 2:49.**

**Second quarter**

- PIT – Kordell Stewart 28-yard run (Jeff Reed kick), 12:43. Steelers 13–7. **Drive: 9 plays, 71 yards, 4:45.**
- JAX – Richie Cunningham 23-yard field goal, 4:32. Steelers 13–10. **Drive: 5 plays, 22 yards, 2:48.**
- PIT – Jeff Reed 30-yard field goal, 1:43. Steelers 16–10. **Drive: 7 plays, 45 yards, 2:49.**

**Third quarter**

- PIT – Jeff Reed 46-yard field goal, 11:12. Steelers 19–10. **Drive: 5 plays, 24 yards, 2:49.**

**Fourth quarter**

- PIT – Jeff Reed 33-yard field goal, 11:37. Steelers 22–10. **Drive: 9 plays, 42 yards, 4:30.**
- JAX – Kyle Brady 42-yard pass from Mark Brunell (Richie Cunningham kick), 8:51. Steelers 22–17. **Drive: 6 plays, 60 yards, 2:46.**
- PIT – Jeff Reed 50-yard field goal,4:30. Steelers 25–17. **Drive: 8 plays, 43 yards, 4:21.**
- JAX – Jimmy Smith 7-yard pass from Mark Brunell (pass failed), 1:16. Steelers 25–23. **Drive: 9 plays, 65 yards, 3:14.**

Top passers

- PIT – Kordell Stewart – 16/26, 202 yards, INT
- JAX – Mark Brunell – 12/23, 146 yards, TD

Top rushers

- PIT – Jerome Bettis – 20 rushes, 86 yards
- JAX – Fred Taylor – 13 rushes, 80 yards, TD

Top receivers

- PIT – Plaxico Burress – 5 receptions, 95 yards
- JAX – Kyle Brady – 3 receptions, 54 yards, TD

==== Week 14: vs. Cleveland Browns ====
Week Fourteen: Cleveland Browns at Jacksonville Jaguars – Game summary

Quarter	1	2	3	4	Total
**Browns**	0	0	14	7	**21**
Jaguars	7	0	7	6	**20**

at Alltel Stadium, Jacksonville, Florida

- Date: December 8, 2002
- Game time: 1:00 p.m. EST
- Game weather: 63 °F (17 °C)
- Game attendance: 46,267
- Referee: Ron Winter
- TV announcers (CBS): Don Criqui, Steve Tasker
- Recap, Game Book

Game information

**First quarter**

- JAX – Kyle Brady 4-yard pass from Mark Brunell (Danny Boyd kick), 1:29. Jaguars 7–. **Drive: 8 plays, 53 yards, 4:45.**

**Second quarter**

- No scoring plays.

**Third quarter**

- CLE – William Green 3-yard run (Phil Dawson kick), 7:33. Tied 7–7. **Drive: 10 plays, 96 yards, 5:51.**
- JAX – Fred Taylor 44-yard run (Danny Boyd kick), 5:28. Jaguars 14–7. **Drive: 5 plays, 67 yards, 2:05.**
- CLE – Quincy Morgan 60-yard pass from Tim Couch (Phil Dawson kick), 3:55. Tied 14–14. **Drive: 3 plays, 74 yards, 1:36.**

**Fourth quarter**

- JAX – Danny Boyd 33-yard field goal, 2:32. Jaguars 17–14. **Drive: 6 plays, 28 yards, 2:41.**
- JAX – Danny Boyd 22-yard field goal, 0:50. Jaguars 20–14. **Drive: 5 plays, 20 yards, 0:35.**
- CLE – Quincy Morgan 50-yard pass from Tim Couch (Phil Dawson kick), 0:00. Browns 21–20. **Drive: 3 plays, 53 yards, 0:50.**

Top passers

- CLE – Tim Couch – 21/35, 264 yards, 2 TD, 2 INT
- JAX – Mark Brunell – 10/14, 73 yards, TD

Top rushers

- CLE – William Green – 26 rushes, 119 yards, TD
- JAX – Fred Taylor – 23 rushes, 145 yards, TD

Top receivers

- CLE – Quincy Morgan – 3 receptions, 118 yards, 2 TD
- JAX – Jimmy Smith – 2 receptions, 23 yards

==== Week 15: at Cincinnati Bengals ====
Week Fifteen: Jacksonville Jaguars at Cincinnati Bengals – Game summary

Quarter	1	2	3	4	Total
**Jaguars**	7	7	8	7	**29**
Bengals	3	9	3	0	**15**

at Paul Brown Stadium, Cincinnati, Ohio

- Date: December 15, 2002
- Game time: 1:00 p.m. EST
- Game weather: Fair, 42 °F (6 °C)
- Game attendance: 42,092
- Referee: Bill Leavy
- TV announcers (CBS): Don Criqui, Steve Tasker
- Recap, Game Book

Game information

**First quarter**

- JAX – Kevin Lockett 12-yard pass from Mark Brunell (Danny Boyd kick), 9:08. Jaguars 9–08. **Drive: 11 plays, 68 yards, 5:52.**
- CIN – Neil Rackers 51-yard field goal, 1:54. Jaguars 7–3. **Drive: 9 plays, 36 yards, 3:55.**

**Second quarter**

- JAX – Pete Mitchell 9-yard pass from Mark Brunell (Danny Boyd kick), 13:45. Jaguars 14–3. **Drive: 6 plays, 62 yards, 3:09.**
- CIN – Neil Rackers 18-yard field goal, 9:05. Jaguars 14–6. **Drive: 8 plays, 63 yards, 4:40.**
- CIN – Jon Kitna 5-yard run (pass failed), 0:58. Jaguars 14–12. **Drive: 14 plays, 80 yards, 6:20.**

**Third quarter**

- CIN – Neil Rackers 25-yard field goal, 9:20. Bengals 15–14. **Drive: 12 plays, 55 yards, 5:40.**
- JAX – Jimmy Smith 26-yard pass from Mark Brunell (run succeeded), 4:48. Jaguars 22–15. **Drive: 9 plays, 70 yards, 4:32.**

**Fourth quarter**

- JAX – Stacey Mack 3-yard run (Danny Boyd kick), 9:52. Jaguars 29–15. **Drive: 9 plays, 62 yards, 5:00.**

Top passers

- JAX – Mark Brunell – 19/28, 223 yards, 3 TD
- CIN – Jon Kitna – 22/42, 258 yards, INT

Top rushers

- JAX – Fred Taylor – 18 rushes, 71 yards
- CIN – Corey Dillon – 21 rushes, 59 yards

Top receivers

- JAX – Jimmy Smith – 7 receptions, 98 yards, TD
- CIN – Chad Johnson – 4 receptions, 91 yards

==== Week 16: vs. Tennessee Titans ====
Week Sixteen: Tennessee Titans at Jacksonville Jaguars – Game summary

Quarter	1	2	3	4	Total
**Titans**	7	7	7	7	**28**
Jaguars	0	3	0	7	**10**

at Alltel Stadium, Jacksonville, Florida

- Date: December 22, 2002
- Game time: 1:00 p.m. EST
- Game weather: 64 °F (18 °C)
- Game attendance: 51,033
- Referee: Bernie Kukar
- TV announcers (CBS): Ian Eagle and Solomon Wilcots
- Recap, Game Book

Game information

**First quarter**

- TEN – Eddie George 4-yard run (Joe Nedney kick), 3:53. Titans 7–0. **Drive: 12 plays, 66 yards, 7:27.**

**Second quarter**

- JAX – Danny Boyd 24-yard field goal, 14:20. Titans 7–3. **Drive: 7 plays, 35 yards, 4:33.**
- TEN – Eddie George 1-yard run (Joe Nedney kick), 8:29. Titans 14–3. **Drive: 10 plays, 70 yards, 5:51.**

**Third quarter**

- TEN – Peter Sirmon 32-yard interception return (Joe Nedyney kick), 2:08. Titans 21–3.

**Fourth quarter**

- TEN – Derrick Mason 5-yard pass from Steve McNair (Joe Nedney kick), 11:26. Titans 28–3. **Drive: 8 plays, 65 yards, 4:38.**
- JAX – Jimmy Smith 4-yard pass from David Garrard (Danny Boyd kick), 0:08. Titans 28–10. **Drive: 18 plays, 85 yards, 4:44.**

Top passers

- TEN – Steve McNair – 13/21, 115 yards, TD
- JAX – Mark Brunell – 12/23, 114 yards, INT

Top rushers

- TEN – Eddie George – 21 rushes, 89 yards, 2 TD
- JAX – Stacey Mack – 9 rushes, 28 yards

Top receivers

- TEN – Derrick Mason – 5 receptions, 56 yards, TD
- JAX – Kyle Brady – 5 receptions, 55 yards

==== Week 17: at Indianapolis Colts ====
Week Seventeen: Jacksonville Jaguars at Indianapolis Colts – Game summary

Quarter	1	2	3	4	Total
Jaguars	3	7	0	3	**13**
**Colts**	0	10	0	10	**20**

at RCA Dome, Indianapolis, Indiana

- Date: December 29, 2002
- Game time: 4:05 p.m. EST
- Game weather: None (indoor stadium)
- Game attendance: 56,755
- Referee: Jeff Triplette
- TV announcers (CBS): Gus Johnson and Brent Jones
- Recap, Game Book

Game information

**First quarter**

- JAX – Danny Boyd 32-yard field goal, 1:58. Jaguars 3–0. **Drive: 8 plays, 38 yards, 3:11.**

**Second quarter**

- IND – Mike Vanderjagt 19-yard field goal, 11:11. Tied 3–3. **Drive: 11 plays, 71 yards, 5:47.**
- JAX – Fred Taylor 9-yard run (Danny Boyd kick), 4:53. Jaguars 10–3. **Drive: 10 plays, 74 yards, 6:18.**
- IND – James Mungro 1-yard run (Mike Vanderjagt kick), 0:18. Tied 10–10. **Drive: 4 plays, 23 yards, 0:43.**

**Third quarter**

- No scoring plays.

**Fourth quarter**

- JAX – Danny Boyd 23-yard field goal, 13:55. Jaguars 13–10. **Drive: 16 plays, 67 yards, 7:51.**
- IND – Mike Vanderjagt 27-yard field goal, 5:46. Tied 13–13. **Drive: 16 plays, 68 yards, 8:09.**
- IND – Marcus Pollard 11-yard pass from Peyton Manning (Mike Vanderjagt kick), 2:26. Colts 20–13. **Drive: 7 plays, 47 yards, 2:11.**

**Top passers**

- JAX – David Garrard – 13/26, 135 yards
- IND – Peyton Manning – 20/28, 146 yards, TD

**Top rushers**

- JAX – Fred Taylor – 15 rushes, 73 yards, TD
- IND – Edgerrin James – 15 rushes, 86 yards

**Top receivers**

- JAX – Jimmy Smith – 3 receptions, 35 yards
- IND – Marcus Pollard – 5 receptions, 39 yards, TD

The Colts began the game sluggishly, but a fumble by the Jaguars at their 23–yard line enabled the Colts to score a quick touchdown, leveling the score by halftime. In the third quarter, as the Colts advanced into Jacksonville territory, James fumbled the ball, allowing the Jaguars to convert it into a field goal and take a 13–10 lead heading into the fourth quarter. On the subsequent drive, the Jaguars appeared to force a three–and–out, but a penalty for running into the kicker granted the Colts a fresh set of downs. Capitalizing on this opportunity, the Colts tied the game with a field goal. After forcing another three–and–out, a strong punt return positioned the Colts at Jacksonville's 47–yard line. Manning then connected with Pollard for an 11–yard touchdown, putting the Colts ahead. In the closing moments, the Colts' defense held firm, securing a 20–13 victory over the Jaguars.

=== Standings ===
==== Division ====
AFC South
	W	L	T	PCT	DIV	CONF	PF	PA	STK
^{(2)} Tennessee Titans	11	5	0	.688	6–0	9–3	367	324	W5
^{(5)} Indianapolis Colts	10	6	0	.625	4–2	8–4	349	313	W1
Jacksonville Jaguars	6	10	0	.375	1–5	4–8	328	315	L2
Houston Texans	4	12	0	.250	1–5	2–10	213	356	L3

==== Conference ====
AFC
#	Team	Division	W	L	T	PCT	DIV	CONF	SOS	SOV
**Division leaders**
1 (Note: Oakland finished ahead of Tennessee based on head-to-head victory.)	Oakland Raiders	West	11	5	0	.688	4–2	9–3	.529	.531
2	Tennessee Titans	South	11	5	0	.688	6–0	9–3	.479	.474
3	Pittsburgh Steelers	North	10	5	1	.656	6–0	8–4	.486	.451
4 (Note: N.Y. Jets finished ahead of New England based on win percentage in common games (8–4 to 7–5) after both finished ahead of Miami based on division record (4–2 to 2–4).)	New York Jets	East	9	7	0	.563	4–2	6–6	.500	.500
**Wild Cards**
5	Indianapolis Colts	South	10	6	0	.625	4–2	8–4	.479	.400
6 (Note: Cleveland finished ahead of Denver and New England based on conference record (7–5 vs 5–7/6–6))	Cleveland Browns	North	9	7	0	.563	3–3	7–5	.486	.413
**Did not qualify for the postseason**
7 (Note: Denver finished ahead of New England based on head-to-head victory.)	Denver Broncos	West	9	7	0	.563	3–3	5–7	.527	.486
8 (Note: New England finished ahead of Miami based on division record (4–2 to 2–4).)	New England Patriots	East	9	7	0	.563	4–2	6–6	.525	.455
9	Miami Dolphins	East	9	7	0	.563	2–4	7–5	.508	.486
10 (Note: Buffalo finished ahead of San Diego based on head-to-head victory.)	Buffalo Bills	East	8	8	0	.500	2–4	5–7	.473	.352
11 (Note: San Diego finished ahead of Kansas City based on division record (3–3 to 2–4).)	San Diego Chargers	West	8	8	0	.500	3–3	6–6	.492	.453
12	Kansas City Chiefs	West	8	8	0	.500	2–4	6–6	.527	.516
13	Baltimore Ravens	North	7	9	0	.438	3–3	7–5	.506	.384
14	Jacksonville Jaguars	South	6	10	0	.375	1–5	4–8	.506	.438
15	Houston Texans	South	4	12	0	.250	1–5	2–10	.518	.492
16	Cincinnati Bengals	North	2	14	0	.125	0–6	1–11	.537	.406
**Tiebreakers** (Note: When breaking ties for three or more teams under the NFL's rules, they are first broken within divisions, then comparing only the highest ranked remaining team from each division.)
