= Bottlegate =

2001 NFL officiating controversy

Bottlegate Game
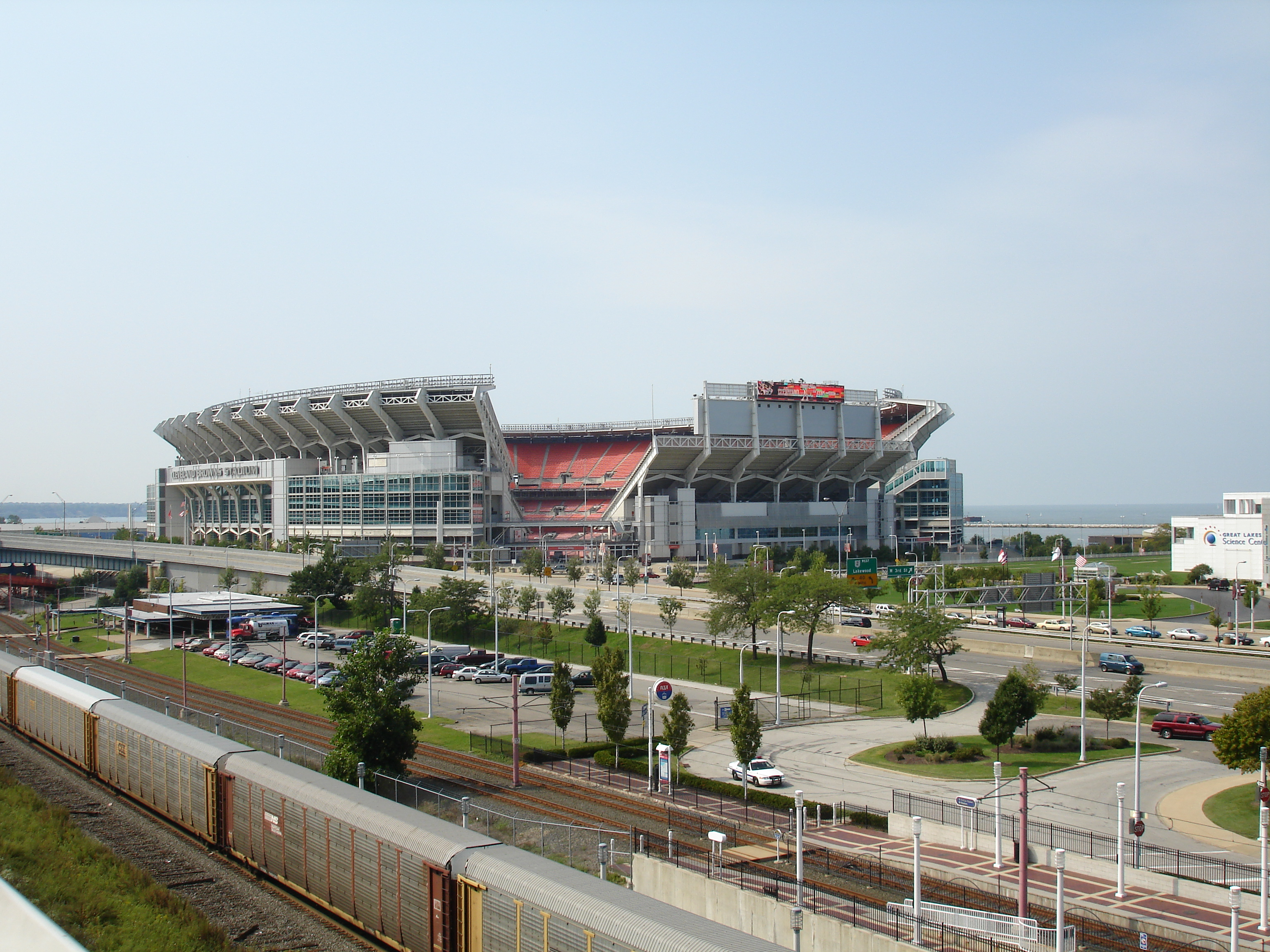
- Cleveland Browns Stadium, the site of the game
Jacksonville Jaguars (4–8)	Cleveland Browns (6–6)
15	10
Head coach: Tom Coughlin	Head coach: Butch Davis
	1	2	3	4	Total
JAX	9	0	0	6	15
CLE	0	0	7	3	10
- Date: December 16, 2001
- Stadium: Cleveland Browns Stadium; Cleveland, Ohio
- Favorite: Browns by 2
- Referee: Terry McAulay
- Attendance: 72,818

TV in the United States
- Network: CBS
- Announcers: Gus Johnson, Brent Jones

Bottlegate, also referred to as The Beer Bottle Game, was an officiating controversy that resulted in a fan riot during an American football game in the 2001 season of the National Football League (NFL) between the visiting Jacksonville Jaguars and the Cleveland Browns.

The inciting incident occurred in week 14 with the Browns' win–loss record at 6–6, needing a win to keep their playoff hopes alive. Down by a 15–10 score with 1:08 remaining, the Browns were forced to try to convert on 4th and 2 at the Jaguars' 12 yard line. Tim Couch took the snap and passed short to Quincy Morgan, who caught the ball for a 3-yard gain and a first down. Although Morgan appeared to bobble the football, officials called it a complete pass. Couch hurried the offense to the line of scrimmage and spiked the ball with 48 seconds remaining. The officials then announced that they would review the 4th down conversion from two plays earlier. After review, the officials overturned the call, ruling it an incomplete pass and giving the ball to the Jaguars. It sparked controversy because NFL officials cannot change a call for any play other than the most recent.

Enraged, Browns fans began throwing objects onto the field, mainly plastic beer bottles. Some fans began throwing the stadium's trash cans down to the field as well. After a few minutes, citing safety concerns, the officials announced that the game would end 48 seconds early and the officials and players exited the field. However, the league office called, telling them to finish the game. The teams and officials came back onto the field, and, after two quarterback kneels by the Jaguars, the game was over, 15–10.

== Background ==
The Cleveland Browns were playing in their third season after resuming play in 1999. Having previously endured the typical struggles of an "expansion" team, the team had shown substantial improvement in 2001. Through their first twelve games, they had managed to compile a .500 record, and had already won more games than in their previous two seasons combined. Nevertheless, a playoff berth seemed unlikely because Cleveland most likely needed to win their four remaining games of the season to qualify.

Meanwhile, the team's beer sponsor, Miller Brewing Company, had introduced a new plastic bottle, marketing it as a safer alternative to the more traditional glass or aluminum. Many concessions providers, including those of the Browns, eagerly adopted the bottles as an alternative to the practice of the time of pouring drinks either on tap from concession stands or from in-stadium sellers into lighter plastic cups to reduce both waste and labor costs.

== Events of the play ==
External videos
- The Bottlegate Game is Pure ANARCHY! - Crazy Endings, from official account NFL Throwback

Trailing 15–10 with 1:08 remaining in regulation, the Browns were driving deep into Jaguars territory, looking for a potential go-ahead score. Cleveland was faced with a 4th down and 2 at the Jacksonville 12 yard line. Since they had already used all of their time-outs, the Browns needed to convert, or else the Jaguars could simply kneel the ball twice and end the game. Quarterback Tim Couch took the snap and passed it short to wide receiver Quincy Morgan, who caught the ball for a 3-yard gain and a first down but appeared to bobble it as he fell to the ground. Despite this, the officials called it a complete pass for a crucial first down with 1:03 remaining. Realizing the call was questionable, Couch wasted no time hurrying the offense to the line of scrimmage, starting the next play with only 0:50 left on the clock. He took the snap and appeared to pump his arm twice; Couch then spiked the ball with 0:48 remaining to stop the clock.

The officials stopped play and huddled for a lengthy period. CBS announcers Gus Johnson and Brent Jones speculated that they may have been discussing Couch's double-pump before the spike. By rule, this would constitute intentional grounding, which would have penalized the Browns ten yards plus loss of down. Instead, referee Terry McAulay announced that the replay booth had buzzed his headset for a review of Morgan's fourth-down catch. NFL rules stipulate that a play cannot be reviewed once another play has commenced, but McAulay told the crowd that the review signal had come before the snap on the spike play, although audio and video evidence provided by CBS seemed to refute McAulay's claim.

After a booth review, the officials ruled that the fourth-down pass was incomplete, resulting in a turnover on downs to Jacksonville. As the Jaguars celebrated, Browns head coach Butch Davis angrily criticized the officials over the timing of the review.

== Crowd reaction ==
After the controversial decision, many attendees at the stadium, including those in the "Dawg Pound" section, became enraged. Some fans began angrily booing and hurling beer bottles, many of which still contained beer. Various other objects were also thrown onto the playing field. The players, officials, and coaches migrated to the middle of the field to escape the debris and prevent injury. Some players reported getting hit, but none were seriously injured. A few fans attempted to storm onto the field, but were quickly detained by law enforcement. After a few minutes of waiting for the crowd to settle, the field had become littered with bottles and debris. For the teams' safety, McAulay announced, "That's the end of the game" with 48 seconds left on the clock; no NFL referee had ever declared a game over before time had expired. After McAulay's announcement, the players, coaches, and officials began to run off the field. As they sprinted towards the tunnels, the officials and some players and coaches were pelted with bottles. Announcers Johnson and Jones told viewers that they saw an unspecified person fall to the ground after a thrown object, which they claimed was either a Sony Walkman or a CD player, "split his head wide open," and lamented the "ugly" actions of the Cleveland fans.

== Game conclusion ==
After several minutes, NFL Commissioner Paul Tagliabue contacted McAulay and informed him that his officiating crew did not have the authority to end a game early, and that the game must be completed. The officials told the players in the locker room, many of whom were undressed and showering, that they were required to go back out onto the field. By the time all players and officials returned to the field, over 20 minutes had elapsed since the disputed fourth down play. After two kneel-downs by the Jaguars, the game concluded with a final score of 15–10. After the game, McAulay stood by his claim the booth had buzzed in before the spike play.

2001 Week Fourteen: Jacksonville Jaguars at Cleveland Browns—Game Summary

Quarter	1	2	3	4	Total
Jaguars	9	0	0	6	15
Browns	0	0	7	3	10

at Cleveland Browns Stadium, Cleveland, Ohio

- Date: December 16
- Game time: 1:00 p.m. EST
- Game weather: 44°F (7°C), clear
- Game attendance: 72,818
- Referee: Terry McAulay
- TV announcers (CBS): Gus Johnson and Brent Jones
- Boxscore

Game information

First quarter

- JAC Jimmy Smith 4-yard pass from Brunell (kick failed)
- JAC Mike Hollis 43-yard FG

Third quarter

- CLE Anthony Henry 97-yard interception return (Phil Dawson kick)

Fourth quarter

- JAC Hollis 46-yard FG
- CLE Dawson 29-yard FG
- JAC Hollis 37-yard FG

Top passers

- JAC – Mark Brunell – 20/35, 202 YDS, TD, 2 INT
- CLE – Tim Couch – 21/30, 184 YDS, INT

Top rushers

- JAC – Stacey Mack – 28 CAR, 115 YDS
- CLE – Jamel White – 9 CAR, 33 YDS

Top receivers

- JAC – Keenan McCardell – 7 REC, 61 YDS
- CLE – JaJuan Dawson – REC, 44 YDS

== Aftermath and legacy ==
The win did not affect the Jaguars significantly, as they were already eliminated from postseason contention and later finished the 2001 season at 6–10, but for the Browns, the loss contributed to the team missing the playoffs. This loss came in the midst of the Browns losing five of their final six games to finish the season at 7–9. It has been considered one of the most infamous moments in Browns history, along with Red Right 88, The Drive, The Fumble, The Move, finishing with the second 0–16 record in NFL history in 2017, and the Deshaun Watson trade. The Browns eventually made it to the playoffs the following year.

Several fans who participated in throwing objects were identified using videotape of the incident; season ticket holders who threw objects later had their tickets revoked.

Many stadiums, including Cleveland Browns Stadium, banned the sale of beer in plastic bottles from their venues to prevent similar events. This incident, along with the 2004 Pacers–Pistons brawl, contributed to the sports business industry's now-common policy of limiting alcohol purchases to two drinks per person per concession stand visit, along with alcohol sales ending after the end of the third quarter (or for baseball, the end of the seventh inning). Aluminum beer bottles, which soon replaced plastic bottles as they are easier to recycle and lighter, are now served at venues with the caps removed to reduce their weight if thrown, reduce cap waste, and prevent injury risk.

On December 17, 2001, the day after the Browns Bottlegate, during a game between the St. Louis Rams and New Orleans Saints, after a defensive pass interference call was made against Saints player, Kevin Mathis, who was covering Rams receiver Torry Holt in the end zone during a pass, Saints fans in the Superdome became angry and started throwing beer bottles, cups, ice and paper onto the field. While this incident didn't last as long and wasn't as severe as what occurred in Cleveland, 13 fans were still arrested. The incident was referred to as "Bottlegate 2".

Bottlegate was later cited as part of a lawsuit filed by New Orleans Saints fans against the NFL officials following another controversial officiating decision during the 2018 NFC Championship Game, in which an apparent pass interference penalty was not called.

== Starting lineups ==
Jacksonville	Position		Cleveland
Offense
Mark Brunell	QB		Tim Couch
Stacey Mack	RB		James Jackson
Kyle Brady	TE	RB	Jamel White
Ryan Prince	TE		O.J. Santiago
Jimmy Smith	WR		Quincy Morgan
Keenan McCardell	WR		Kevin Johnson
Todd Fordham	LT		Ross Verba
Brad Meester	LG		Shaun O'Hara
Jeff Smith	C		Dave Wohlabaugh
Zach Wiegert	RG		Brad Bedell
Maurice Williams	RT		Roger Chanoine
Defense
Renaldo Wynn	LDE		Tyrone Rogers
Gary Walker	LDT		Gerard Warren
Seth Payne	RDT		Mark Smith
Tony Brackens	RDE		Jamir Miller
Jeff Posey	SLB		Marquis Smith
Hardy Nickerson	MLB		Wali Rainer
Edward Thomas	WLB		Dwayne Rudd
Jason Craft	LCB		Corey Fuller
Kiwaukee Thomas	RCB		Anthony Henry
Donovin Darius	SS		Earl Little
Ainsley Battles	FS		Devin Bush

== Officials ==
- Referee: Terry McAulay (#77)
- Umpire: Carl Paganelli (#124)
- Head linesman: Earnie Frantz (#111)
- Line judge: Byron Boston (#18)
- Field judge: Scott Steenson (#88)
- Side judge: Bill Spyksma (#12)
- Back judge: Billy Smith (#2)

== See also ==
- 2001 Cleveland Browns season
- 2001 Jacksonville Jaguars season
- 2001 NFL season
- 2018 NFC Championship Game, which featured a controversial officiating decision later known as the "NOLA No-Call"
- Fail Mary
- 2019 Pittsburgh Steelers–Cleveland Browns brawl
- List of -gate scandals and controversies
- List of nicknamed NFL games and plays
- National Football League controversies
- Ten-Cent Beer Night, 1974 incident in which a Cleveland Indians game ended early due to unruly fan behavior
