= Patrick Washington =

American football player (born 1978)

No. 31
- Position: Fullback

Personal information
- Born: March 4, 1978 (age 48); Washington, D.C., U.S.
- Listed height: 6 ft 2 in (1.88 m)
- Listed weight: 244 lb (111 kg)

Career information
- High school: St. Albans (Washington, D.C.)
- College: Virginia
- NFL draft: 2001: undrafted

Career history
- Jacksonville Jaguars (2001–2002)

Career NFL statistics
- Receptions: 6
- Receiving yards: 41
- Yards per reception: 6.8
- Kick return yards: 35
- Total tackles: 17
- Stats at Pro Football Reference

Patrick Dylan Washington (born March 4, 1978) is an American former professional football player who was a fullback for two seasons with the Jacksonville Jaguars of the National Football League (NFL). He played two seasons with the Jacksonville Jaguars. He played college football for the Virginia Cavaliers.

== Professional career ==
The Jaguars signed Washington, an undrafted rookie, prior to the 2001 NFL season because they did not have the salary cap space to pay the veteran minimum salary for a fullback.

In the 2001 and 2002 seasons, Washington played in a total of 30 games, starting in nine of them. He had no carries, but he had six catches for 41 yards. He also had 35 kick return yards and 17 total tackles.
