= Eric Westmoreland =

American football player (born 1977)

No. 52, 56
- Position: Linebacker

Personal information
- Born: March 11, 1977 (age 49); Jasper, Tennessee, U.S.

Career information
- High school: Marion County (Jasper)
- College: Tennessee
- NFL draft: 2001: 3rd round, 73rd overall pick

Career history
- Jacksonville Jaguars (2001–2003); Cleveland Browns (2004)

Awards and highlights
- BCS national champion (1998); Second-team All-SEC (2000)

Career NFL statistics
- Tackles: 81
- Sacks: 2
- Passes defended: 3
- Stats at Pro Football Reference

Eric Westmoreland (born March 11, 1977) is an American former professional football player who was a linebacker in the National Football League (NFL) from 2001 to 2004 for the Jacksonville Jaguars and Cleveland Browns. He was selected in the third round of the 2001 NFL draft.

== Early life ==
Westmoreland played high school football at Marion County High School in Jasper, Tennessee. He led the Warriors to three state championships as a running back/safety. He rushed for 2,359 yards and 40 touchdowns as a senior and finished with more than 6,000 yards and 85 touchdowns in his high school career. The Warriors racked up an 56–1 record.

Westmoreland played college football at the University of Tennessee where he was a starting linebacker and helped the Vols win the 1998 National Championship in the Fiesta Bowl.

== Professional career ==
Westmoreland played in four seasons in the NFL from 2001 to 2004. He spent his first three seasons with the Jaguars and his last with the Browns.

=== NFL career statistics ===
Legend
**Bold**	Career high

Year	Team	Games		Tackles					Interceptions					Fumbles			
Year	Team	GP	GS	Cmb	Solo	Ast	Sck	TFL	Int	Yds	TD	Lng	PD	FF	FR	Yds	TD
2001	JAX	11	**2**	22	17	5	**1.0**	**3**	0	0	0	0	0	0	**1**	0	0
2002	JAX	15	**2**	**36**	**29**	**7**	**1.0**	2	0	0	0	0	**2**	0	**1**	0	0
2003	JAX	2	0	3	3	0	0.0	0	0	0	0	0	0	0	0	0	0
2004	CLE	**16**	0	20	14	6	0.0	1	0	0	0	0	1	**1**	**1**	0	0
Career		44	4	81	63	18	2.0	6	0	0	0	0	3	1	3	0	0
