= Danny Boyd =

American football player (born 1978)

No. 5
- Position: Placekicker

Personal information
- Born: June 1, 1978 (age 48); Bradenton, Florida, U.S.
- Listed height: 5 ft 11 in (1.80 m)
- Listed weight: 210 lb (95 kg)

Career information
- High school: Southeast (Bradenton)
- College: LSU
- NFL draft: 2002: undrafted

Career history
- New York Jets (2002)*; Berlin Thunder (2002); New York Giants (2002)*; Jacksonville Jaguars (2002); San Francisco 49ers (2004)*
- * Offseason or practice squad member only

Career NFL statistics
- Field goals: 5
- Longest field goal: 33
- Extra points: 7
- Points scored: 22
- Games played: 4
- Total tackles: 1
- Stats at Pro Football Reference

Daniel Edward Boyd is an American former professional football player who was a placekicker for the Jacksonville Jaguars of the National Football League (NFL) in 2002. He played college football for the LSU Tigers. He is also a school music instructor.

== College career ==
In four years at Louisiana State University, Boyd was mostly a kickoff specialist and backup field goal kicker, having only eight field goal attempts, converting two of them.

== Professional career ==
Amidst a 2002 season of high turnover among placekickers on the Jacksonville Jaguars team, Boyd was signed to the squad with four games remaining. He became the fourth player to assume kicking duties in the regular season that year for the Jaguars. All of his scoring attempts went through the uprights, as he was a perfect 5 for 5 on field goals and 7 for 7 on extra points for a total of 22 points. He also had 17 kickoffs.

Boyd was waived on August 25, 2003.

== Personal life ==
Boyd also has a strong passion and talent in music. He has played the trumpet since childhood and he originally thought his career would be in music. After graduating from LSU, he got a job teaching music at Baton Rouge High School. He also taught band at Lakewood Ranch High School, as well as Bayshore Highschool and led other music groups at various middle schools and high schools.
