= Jimmy Smith (wide receiver) =

American football player (born 1969)

No. 82
- Position: Wide receiver

Personal information
- Born: February 9, 1969 (age 57); Detroit, Michigan, U.S.
- Listed height: 6 ft 1 in (1.85 m)
- Listed weight: 202 lb (92 kg)

Career information
- High school: Callaway (Jackson, Mississippi)
- College: Jackson State (1987–1991)
- NFL draft: 1992: 2nd round, 36th overall pick

Career history
- Dallas Cowboys (1992–1993); Philadelphia Eagles (1994)*; Jacksonville Jaguars (1995–2005)
- * Offseason or practice squad member only

Awards and highlights
- 2× Super Bowl champion (XXVII, XXVIII); 2× Second-team All-Pro (1998, 1999); 5× Pro Bowl (1997–2001); NFL receptions leader (1999); Pride of the Jaguars; Second-team All-SWAC (1991)

Career NFL statistics
- Receptions: 862
- Receiving yards: 12,287
- Receiving touchdowns: 67
- Stats at Pro Football Reference

Jimmy Lee Smith Jr. (born February 9, 1969) is an American former professional football who was a wide receiver in the National Football League (NFL) for the Dallas Cowboys and Jacksonville Jaguars. He played college football for the Jackson State Tigers. With the Cowboys, he won two consecutive Super Bowls over the Buffalo Bills.

== Early life ==
Smith is the son of Jimmy and Etta Smith. He attended Callaway High School in Jackson, Mississippi. He played wide receiver and earned all-conference honors as a senior. He was given the nickname "Silk" by his teammates, for making the big plays look easy.

== College career ==
Smith didn't have any Division I offers coming out of high school, so he accepted a football scholarship from Jackson State University. He was a backup wide receiver in his first two seasons.

He became a starter as a junior, teaming with Tim Barnett and becoming the top receiving duo in Division I-AA, while registering 40 receptions (led the team) for 877 yards (21.3-yard average) and 9 touchdowns. Against Southern University, he made 4 receptions for 184 yards and tied a school record with 3 receiving touchdowns (70, 64 and 37 yards).

In his final year, he led the team with 43 catches for 801 yards (18.4-yard average) and 3 touchdowns. He finished his college career with 110 receptions, 2,073 yards and 16 touchdowns. Against Delaware State University, he set a school record with 10 receptions for 239 yards, including a 71-yard touchdown. He graduated with a bachelor's degree in business administration.

In 2011, he was named to the Jackson State University All-Century team.

== Professional career ==
Pre-draft measurables
Height	Weight	Arm length	Hand span	40-yard dash	10-yard split	20-yard split	20-yard shuttle	Vertical jump	Broad jump
6 ft 0 3/4 in (1.85 m)	200 lb (91 kg)	32 5/8 in (0.83 m)	10 1/8 in (0.26 m)	4.58 s	1.59 s	2.59 s	4.14 s	35.0 in (0.89 m)	10 ft 0 in (3.05 m)
All values from NFL Combine

=== Dallas Cowboys ===
Smith was selected by the Dallas Cowboys in the second round (36th overall) of the 1992 NFL draft. He missed the first four games after he broke his right fibula during the Dallas Blue-White Scrimmage on July 19. After missing ample time during the season, he was listed as the fourth wide receiver on the Dallas Cowboys' depth chart, behind Michael Irvin, Alvin Harper, and Kelvin Martin. On October 11, he made his professional regular season debut during a 27–0 victory over the Seattle Seahawks. In a Week 16 matchup against the Atlanta Falcons, Smith had the highlight of his rookie year, tackling Deion Sanders during a punt return in a 41–17 victory. He played in just seven games as a special-teamer, without registering a reception. The Cowboys finished first in the NFC East, with a 13–3 record. On January 10, 1993, he appeared in his first career playoff game during the Cowboys' 34–10 win over the Philadelphia Eagles, playing on special teams. Smith earned the first ring of his career as a rookie, after the Cowboys went on to Super Bowl XXVII and defeated the Buffalo Bills 52–17.

In 1993, he was leading the team in pre-season receptions (13) and receiving yards (197), while competing for the role as the third wide receiver that was left open with the departure in free agency of Kelvin Martin, behind Irvin and Harper. On August 21, Smith began feeling a pain in his abdominal area and brought it to the attention of two trainers and the team doctor, J.D. Zamarano, and was given Pepto Bismol, Maalox, and Tagamet. He played in the next preseason game and caught a touchdown reception, and was waved back in by a coach after taking himself out from taking a hit to the abdominal area that worsened the pain. Over the next few days, he repeatedly brought the pain to the attention of the trainers and wasn't given adequate care or the correct diagnosis. He asked to be directed to a doctor and was told to see the team doctor who gave him a checkup and took him to see the team surgeon, who finally diagnosed him with appendicitis. On August 24, 1993, he underwent an emergency appendectomy. The following day, the surgeon released him from the hospital, notwithstanding a 102.5 °F (39.2 °C) fever. On August 27, Smith was readmitted to the hospital after waking up in severe pain, vomiting and with a bloated stomach, because of a severe post-surgical infection that was nearly fatal. He went into emergency surgery for an ileostomy, in which a portion of his intestine was dissected and removed, with an external bag then fitted to collect his fecal matter, forcing Smith to miss the entire season, including Super Bowl XXVIII. On October 2, the Cowboys placed him on the non-football illness list and opted not to pay his entire $350,000 salary for the 1993 season, as well as his insurance, pension, and free agent credits, instead making Smith an offer of $100,000 and no credits, which he declined. The NFL Players Association filed a grievance with the Cowboys on Smith's behalf, alleging that he was due his full salary, which he won after going through arbitration.

On July 11, 1994, he was waived after refusing to take a pay cut.

=== Philadelphia Eagles ===
On July 19, 1994, he was signed as a free agent by the Philadelphia Eagles but was eventually released on August 30.

=== Jacksonville Jaguars ===
On February 28, 1995, Smith was signed by the expansion Jacksonville Jaguars after a tryout. He made the team after head coach Tom Coughlin saw his talents. He competed with Desmond Howard, Ernest Givens, Willie Jackson, Cedric Tillman, and Curtis Marsh throughout training camp for a job as a starting wide receiver. Head coach Tom Coughlin named him the fifth wide receiver on the depth chart behind Howard, Givens, Jackson, and Tillman. He finished the season leading the Jaguars in kickoff returns.

The next year, he became a starter after Andre Rison was released following the 11th game against the Pittsburgh Steelers. He would emerge as a dominant receiver, finishing with 1,244 receiving yards (leading the AFC) and 7 touchdowns, while helping the team win its last five games and reach the AFC Championship Game.

Smith would remain one of the cornerstones of the franchise for a decade. His teammates gave him the nickname J-Smooth and would later be known with Keenan McCardell as "Thunder and Lightning", after a TV Guide photo shoot in 1997. Their history together was detailed in NFL Film's 2014 A Football Life: "Keenan McCardell & Jimmy Smith".

Smith continued to be a key member of the Jaguars offense and helped lead the team to playoff appearances for four straight years (1996–1999). In 1999, he helped make the Jaguars the best team in the NFL during the regular season, registering 1,636 receiving yards and 6 touchdowns.

In 2000, his best career game came against arguably one of the best defenses in NFL history, when he posted 15 receptions, 291 receiving yards (fifth in NFL history) and 3 touchdowns, against the eventual Super Bowl champion the Baltimore Ravens.

In 2001, he overcame three difficult intestine operations during the offseason, to remove scar tissue related to the appendectomy procedure he underwent in Dallas. On November 26, he was found to have benzoylecgonine (a by-product of cocaine) in his system after being pulled over on suspicion of drunk driving. He denied using cocaine and was not charged with any crime since he was not found to be impaired while driving. The incident placed him into the NFL's substance-abuse program.

In 2003, he was handed a four-game suspension for an undisclosed substance abuse violation. He would have a down year with 805 receiving yards and 4 touchdowns.

On May 11, 2006, Smith abruptly retired from the NFL. He finished his career seventh in NFL history with 862 catches and 11th in league history with 12,287 yards. He had 67 career touchdown catches with the Jaguars. Smith had been voted to the Pro Bowl five straight times from 1997 to 2001. He is also the Jacksonville Jaguars all-time leading receiver, having led the team in receiving every season from 1996–2005. He set team records with 116 receptions (also led the league) and 1,636 yards in 1999, both career-highs. His career high in touchdowns was eight, achieved in 1998, 2000 and 2001.

In 2016, he was inducted into the Pride of the Jaguars (the franchise's ring of honor).

== NFL career statistics ==
Legend
	Won the Super Bowl
	Led the league
**Bold**	Career high

=== Regular season ===
Year	Team	Games		Receiving						Fumbles	
Year	Team	GP	GS	Rec	Yds	Avg	Lng	TD	FD	Fum	Lost
1992	DAL	7	0	0	0	0.0	0	0	0	0	0
1993	DAL	0	0	Did not play due to injury							
1995	JAX	16	4	22	288	13.1	33	3	12	**2**	0
1996	JAX	16	9	83	1,244	15.0	62	7	60	1	**1**
1997	JAX	16	16	82	1,324	**16.1**	**75**	4	64	1	0
1998	JAX	16	15	78	1,182	15.2	72	**8**	50	**2**	**1**
1999	JAX	16	16	**116**	**1,636**	14.1	62	6	**86**	1	**1**
2000	JAX	15	14	91	1,213	13.3	65	**8**	60	1	0
2001	JAX	16	16	112	1,373	12.3	35	**8**	68	1	0
2002	JAX	16	16	80	1,027	12.8	47	7	53	0	0
2003	JAX	12	12	54	805	14.9	67	4	38	1	0
2004	JAX	16	16	74	1,172	15.8	65	6	52	**2**	**1**
2005	JAX	16	16	70	1,023	14.6	45	6	56	0	0
Career		178	150	862	12,287	14.3	75	67	599	12	4

=== Playoffs ===
Year	Team	Games		Receiving						Fumbles	
Year	Team	GP	GS	Rec	Yds	Avg	Lng	TD	FD	Fum	Lost
1992	DAL	2	0	0	0	0.0	0	0	0	0	0
1993	DAL	0	0	Did not play due to injury							
1996	JAX	3	3	**11**	174	15.8	44	2	**9**	0	0
1997	JAX	1	1	6	55	9.2	16	0	5	0	0
1998	JAX	2	2	10	160	16.0	52	**3**	6	0	0
1999	JAX	2	2	10	**228**	**22.8**	**70**	2	8	0	0
2005	JAX	1	1	3	30	10.0	19	0	2	0	0
Career		11	9	40	647	16.2	70	7	30	0	0

=== NFL records ===
- Most games with at least 5 receptions in a season - 16 (every game in 2001). Since tied by Antonio Brown and Pierre Garçon.
- Most consecutive games with at least 5 receptions - 21. Since broken by Antonio Brown.
- Most games with at least 49 receiving yards in a season - 16 (every game in 2001)

=== Jaguars franchise records ===
As of the 2017 NFL off-season, Jimmy Smith held at least 31 Jaguars franchise records, including:

- Receptions: career (862), season (116 in 1999)
- Receiving Yds: career (12,287), season (1,636 in 1999), game (291 on 2000-09-10 @BAL), playoffs (647), playoff season (228 in 1999), playoff game (136 on 2000-01-15 MIA)
- Yds/Rec: career (14.25), playoffs (16.18), playoff season (22.8 in 1999), playoff game (27.2 on 2000-01-15 MIA)
- Receiving TDs: career (67), game (3 on 2000-09-10 @BAL), playoffs (7), playoff season (3 in 1998), playoff game (2 on 2000-01-15 MIA)
- Rec Yds/Game: career (71.9), playoffs (71.9), playoff season (114 in 1999)
- Total TDs: playoffs (7), playoff season (3 in 1998), playoff game (2 on 2000-01-15 MIA)
- Yds from Scrimmage: game (291 on 2000-09-10 @BAL)
- 100+ yard receiving games: career (48), season (10 in 1999), playoffs (2)
- Games with 1+ TD scored: career (64), playoffs (5)
- Games with 2+ TD scored: playoffs (2)
- 1,000+ receiving yard seasons: career (9)

== Personal life ==
Smith and his wife Sandra currently reside in his hometown of Jackson, Mississippi, with their five children, Jimmy III ("Trey"), Jaden, Dalys, Dyson and Jayse. In September 2014, Trey accepted a football scholarship to the University of Louisville. Trey later transferred to the Wyoming Cowboys where he was a key contributor. Trey was given a try-out by his father's former team, the Jacksonville Jaguars, but was not offered a contract.

His father, Jimmy Smith Sr., played linebacker for the Cincinnati Bengals in 1968.

His popularity led some sushi restaurants in Jacksonville, Florida, to honor him with a specialty sushi roll known as "The Jimmy Smith Roll". The roll consists of "smoked salmon, cream cheese, scallions and crabstick deep fried with spicy mayo sauce". Rolls bearing Jimmy Smith's name can still be found at many sushi restaurants in Jacksonville and the surrounding areas.

== Legal issues ==
In April 2009, Smith was arrested for multiple drug charges. Since then, he has been through rehab and made an effort to make a difference in other people's lives through the Jimmy Smith Foundation.

In 2013, Smith was sentenced to serve six years in the Mississippi Department of Corrections after being convicted of drug and weapons charges; two years for "possession of a firearm by a convicted felon" and four years for possession of cocaine. Although his tentative release date was November 8, 2018, he was released on July 2, 2013, on the condition of house arrest.
