= Ainsley Battles =

American football player (born 1978)

No. 28, 26, 27
- Position: Safety

Personal information
- Born: November 6, 1978 (age 47); Lilburn, Georgia, U.S.
- Listed height: 5 ft 11 in (1.80 m)
- Listed weight: 204 lb (93 kg)

Career information
- High school: Parkview (Lilburn)
- College: Vanderbilt
- NFL draft: 2000: undrafted

Career history
- Pittsburgh Steelers (2000); Jacksonville Jaguars (2001–2002); Buffalo Bills (2003)*; Pittsburgh Steelers (2004)
- * Offseason or practice squad member only

Awards and highlights
- Second-team All-SEC (1999)

Career NFL statistics
- Tackles: 114
- Sacks: 2
- Interceptions: 3
- Stats at Pro Football Reference

Ainsley Thomas Battles (born November 6, 1978) is an American former professional football player who was a safety in the National Football League (NFL). He played college football for the Vanderbilt Commodores.

Battles attended Parkview High School in Lilburn, Georgia. After finishing high school, he went on to play football at Vanderbilt University. After finishing school at Vanderbilt, he played professionally in the NFL. He played four seasons for the Pittsburgh Steelers and the Jacksonville Jaguars. During a heated 2003 training camp battle for starting strong safety with the Buffalo Bills, Ainsley Battles left the team for an undisclosed reason. After his time as a football player was over, he went on to be a Social Studies teacher at Archer High School and at Central Gwinnett High School, both in Lawrenceville, Georgia. Later he taught English II at Atlantic Coast High School in Jacksonville, Florida, where he also served as a defensive backs football coach. Most recently, he resides in Las Vegas, Nevada.

== NFL career statistics ==
Legend
	Led the league
**Bold**	Career high

Year	Team	Games		Tackles					Interceptions					Fumbles			
Year	Team	GP	GS	Cmb	Solo	Ast	Sck	TFL	Int	Yds	TD	Lng	PD	FF	FR	Yds	TD
2000	PIT	**16**	1	35	23	**12**	**1.0**	3	0	0	0	0	**2**	0	**2**	-1	0
2001	JAX	13	**11**	**56**	**51**	5	**1.0**	**4**	**2**	**26**	0	**26**	**2**	**1**	**2**	**60**	**1**
2002	JAX	**16**	4	22	19	3	0.0	1	1	6	0	6	1	0	1	0	0
2004	PIT	1	0	1	1	0	0.0	0	0	0	0	0	0	0	0	0	0
		46	16	114	94	20	2.0	8	3	32	0	26	5	1	5	59	1
