= Jason Brookins =

American football player (born 1976)

No. 44
- Position: Running back

Personal information
- Born: January 5, 1976 (age 50); Mexico, Missouri, U.S.
- Listed height: 6 ft 0 in (1.83 m)
- Listed weight: 235 lb (107 kg)

Career information
- High school: Mexico
- College: Lane
- NFL draft: 2000: undrafted

Career history
- Baltimore Ravens (2000)*; Oakland Raiders (2000)*; Jacksonville Jaguars (2000)*; Baltimore Ravens (2001); → Rhein Fire (2001); Green Bay Packers (2002)*; Montreal Alouettes (2003)*
- * Offseason or practice squad member only

Career NFL statistics
- Rushing yards: 551
- Rushing average: 3.6
- Rushing touchdowns: 5
- Receptions: 6
- Receiving yards: 45
- Stats at Pro Football Reference

Jason Arnaz Brookins (born January 5, 1976) is an American former professional football player who was a running back for one season with the Baltimore Ravens of the National Football League (NFL). He played college football for the Lane Dragons in Jackson, Tennessee.

== Professional career ==
Brookins ran for 551 yards with 5 touchdowns on 151 carries with the Ravens in 2001. He took over the starting position after an injury to Jamal Lewis.

On June 3, 2002, Brookins would sign with the Green Bay Packers. He was released from the Packers after a misunderstanding. He left camp unexcused after being asked to turn in his playbook. It is common practice that when a player is released from an organization, that they must return their playbook. However the Packers did not plan to release him. They just wanted to update his playbook. On August 28, Brookins would be placed on the exempt list by the NFL. He would formally be released from the Packers the following day.
