= Keenan McCardell =

American football player and coach (born 1970)

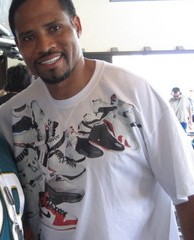
- McCardell in 2007

Minnesota Vikings
- Title: Wide receivers coach

Personal information
- Born: January 6, 1970 (age 56); Houston, Texas, U.S.
- Listed height: 6 ft 1 in (1.85 m)
- Listed weight: 191 lb (87 kg)

Career information
- Position: Wide receiver (No. 87, 86, 80)
- High school: Waltrip (Houston)
- College: UNLV (1988–1990)
- NFL draft: 1991: 12th round, 326th overall pick

Career history

Playing
- Washington Redskins (1991); Cleveland Browns (1992–1993); Chicago Bears (1993)*; Cleveland Browns (1993–1995); Jacksonville Jaguars (1996–2001); Tampa Bay Buccaneers (2002–2003); San Diego Chargers (2004–2006); Houston Texans (2007)*; Washington Redskins (2007)
- * Offseason or practice squad member only

Coaching
- Washington Redskins (2010–2011) Wide receivers coach; Maryland (2014–2015) Wide receivers coach; Jacksonville Jaguars (2017–2020) Wide receivers coach; Minnesota Vikings (2021–present) Wide receivers coach

Awards and highlights
- 2× Super Bowl champion (XXVI, XXXVII); 2× Pro Bowl (1996, 2003); First-team All-Big West (1990)

Career NFL statistics
- Receptions: 883
- Receiving yards: 11,373
- Receiving touchdowns: 63
- Stats at Pro Football Reference

Keenan Wayne McCardell (/mɪˈkɑːrdɪl/; born January 6, 1970) is an American football coach and former wide receiver who is the wide receivers coach for the Minnesota Vikings of the National Football League (NFL). He previously served as the wide receivers coach for the Jacksonville Jaguars, University of Maryland, College Park, and Washington Redskins.

McCardell played college football for the University of Nevada, Las Vegas (UNLV) and was drafted by the Washington Redskins in the 12th round of the 1991 NFL draft. He played for 17 seasons in the NFL and also played for the Cleveland Browns, Jacksonville Jaguars, Tampa Bay Buccaneers, San Diego Chargers and Houston Texans. A two-time Pro Bowl selection, McCardell won two Super Bowl rings, with the Redskins in 1991 and the Tampa Bay Buccaneers in 2002.

== Early life ==
McCardell is the son of Arthur and Mattie McCardell. He attended Waltrip High School in Houston, Texas. He was a three-sport athlete, playing quarterback in football as well as participating in basketball and track.

== Playing career ==
=== College ===
McCardell starred at UNLV, where his speed and athleticism enabled him to become one of the premier wide receivers in college football. He left as the school's leading all-time receiver with 141 catches for 2,189 yards (15.5 yards per catch) and 15 touchdowns. He emerged as UNLV's big-play receiver during his junior year, catching 54 passes for 883 yards (16.4 avg.) and five touchdowns, while being named team MVP and becoming the first UNLV receiver to post four consecutive 100-yard games.

=== National Football League ===
Pre-draft measurables
Height	Weight	Arm length	Hand span	40-yard dash	10-yard split	20-yard split	20-yard shuttle	Vertical jump
5 ft 11 7/8 in (1.83 m)	175 lb (79 kg)	32 in (0.81 m)	10 1/4 in (0.26 m)	4.56 s	1.60 s	2.64 s	4.18 s	36.5 in (0.93 m)
All values from NFL Combine

==== Washington Redskins (first stint) ====
McCardell was selected in the 12th round of the 1991 NFL draft by the Washington Redskins, but he never took the field in a Redskins' uniform. He, however, got a Super Bowl ring with the Redskins while being on injured reserve. He was cut after the 1991 season.

==== Cleveland Browns ====
McCardell signed with the Cleveland Browns in 1992. He saw his first regular season action, but only recorded one reception for eight yards. Most of the season was spent on injured reserve due to a knee injury.

He was released by the Browns early in the 1993 regular season to make room for fullback Kevin Mack. The Chicago Bears added him to their practice squad in November, though Cleveland brought him back a month later. In Week 16 against the New England Patriots, he scored his first professional touchdowns. He added two more the following week against the Los Angeles Rams. His production steadily increased during his time in Cleveland. He had ten receptions for 182 yards in the 1994 season. Although he only started five games in 1995, he racked up 56 catches, 709 yards, and four touchdowns. Following the season, he became a free agent. He finished his career with the Browns with 80 receptions for 1,133 yards and eight touchdowns.

==== Jacksonville Jaguars ====
McCardell signed a three-year $6 million contract with the Jacksonville Jaguars on March 1, 1996. During his first season with the team he made 85 catches for 1,129 yards and three touchdowns, and earned himself a trip to his first ever Pro Bowl. With the emergence of teammate Jimmy Smith, the Jaguars had one of the best duos at wide receiver in the NFL. They earned the nickname "Thunder and Lightning" with McCardell as "Thunder" because of his ability to run routes in the middle of the field. After the 2001 season, McCardell, along with many other Jaguar starters, were waived due to salary cap reasons. He finished his six-year career with the Jaguars recording 499 receptions for 6,393 yards and 30 touchdowns.

==== Tampa Bay Buccaneers ====
McCardell signed with the Tampa Bay Buccaneers before the 2002 season. The Buccaneers would go on to win Super Bowl XXXVII, beating the AFC champion Oakland Raiders 48–21 with McCardell scoring two touchdowns in that game. He became the team's primary receiver late in the 2003 season, making his second Pro Bowl, mainly due to a dispute between receiver Keyshawn Johnson and the Buccaneers organization, which ultimately ended in Johnson being traded to the Dallas Cowboys for Joey Galloway.

McCardell started the 2004 season as a holdout with the Buccaneers after wanting a new contract.

==== San Diego Chargers ====
After the dispute with the Buccaneers, McCardell was traded to the San Diego Chargers in exchange for a third- and fifth-round draft pick in the 2005 NFL draft. In 2005, he was the team's second-leading receiver behind tight end Antonio Gates, totaling 70 catches for 917 yards, and a career-high nine touchdown receptions. On December 4, 2005, in a game against the Oakland Raiders, McCardell became the 13th player in NFL history to record 800 career receptions.

On March 1, 2007, McCardell was released by the Chargers. In three years with the team he totaled 137 receptions for 1,747 yards and 10 touchdowns.

==== Houston Texans ====
On July 23, 2007, McCardell signed with the Houston Texans, but was eventually cut on August 31, without playing a game for the team.

==== Washington Redskins (second stint) ====
On October 1, 2007, McCardell signed with the Washington Redskins. He played in 10 games, recording 22 receptions for 256 yards and a touchdown.

McCardell finished his career with 883 receptions, which is 13th most all time. He also ranks 23rd in total receiving yardage with 11,373.

== NFL career statistics ==
Legend
	Won the Super Bowl
**Bold**	Career high

Year	Team	Games		Receiving				
Year	Team	GP	GS	Rec	Yds	Avg	Lng	TD
1991	WAS	Did not appear in any games						
1992	CLE	2	0	1	8	8.0	8	0
1993	CLE	6	3	13	234	18.0	43	4
1994	CLE	13	3	10	182	**18.2**	34	0
1995	CLE	**16**	5	56	709	12.7	36	4
1996	JAX	**16**	15	85	1,129	13.3	52	3
1997	JAX	**16**	**16**	85	1,164	13.7	60	5
1998	JAX	15	15	64	892	13.9	67	6
1999	JAX	**16**	15	78	891	11.4	49	5
2000	JAX	**16**	**16**	**94**	**1,207**	12.8	67	5
2001	JAX	**16**	**16**	93	1,110	11.9	45	6
2002	TB	14	14	61	670	11.0	65	6
2003	TB	**16**	**16**	84	1,174	14.0	**76**	8
2004	SD	7	6	31	393	12.7	31	1
2005	SD	**16**	**16**	70	917	13.1	54	**9**
2006	SD	14	11	36	437	12.1	28	0
2007	WAS	10	1	22	256	11.6	32	1
Career		209	168	883	11,373	12.9	76	63

== Coaching career ==
=== Washington Redskins ===
After coaching the West team wide receivers for the 2010 East-West Shrine Game, McCardell was hired by the Washington Redskins to coach their wide receivers on January 27, 2010. He was fired on January 11, 2012.

=== Maryland Terrapins ===
From 2014 to 2015, he served as wide receivers coach for the Maryland Terrapins under head coach Randy Edsall, where he coached current NFL Pro Bowler Stefon Diggs.

=== Jacksonville Jaguars ===
On January 20, 2017, McCardell was hired by the Jacksonville Jaguars as their wide receivers coach under head coach Doug Marrone and reuniting with former head coach Tom Coughlin, who served as executive vice president of football operations for the Jaguars.

=== Minnesota Vikings ===
On February 9, 2021, McCardell was hired by the Minnesota Vikings as their wide receivers coach under head coach Mike Zimmer, replacing Andrew Janocko, who was promoted to quarterbacks coach. On February 11, 2022, McCardell was confirmed to be staying with the Vikings despite the firing of head coach Mike Zimmer and GM Rick Spielman.

== Personal life ==
McCardell and his wife, Nicole, have four children: daughters Keandra, Nia and Nakeeya, and son Keenan II.
