= James Boyd (American football) =

American football player (born 1977)

No. 42
- Position: Defensive back

Personal information
- Born: October 17, 1977 (age 49); Norfolk, Virginia, U.S.

Career information
- High school: Chesapeake (VA) Indian River
- College: Penn State
- NFL draft: 2001: 3rd round, 94th overall pick

Career history
- Jacksonville Jaguars (2001–2002); Cleveland Browns (2005)*
- * Offseason or practice squad member only

Awards and highlights
- First-team All-Big Ten (2000)

Career NFL statistics
- Total tackles: 14
- Passes defended: 2
- Forced fumbles: 1
- Stats at Pro Football Reference

James Aaron Boyd (born October 17, 1977) is an American former professional football player who was a defensive back for the Jacksonville Jaguars of the National Football League (NFL). He attended Indian River High School in Chesapeake, and as quarterback, guided the team to a state football championship in 1995.

== College career ==
Boyd played free safety at Penn State. In 2000, he was one of 12 semifinalists for the Jim Thorpe Award, which is given to the best defensive back in college football.

== Professional career ==
James was selected in the 3rd round (94th overall) of the 2001 NFL draft by the Jacksonville Jaguars. He wore #42. In his rookie season (2001–02), he played in 16 games, assisting on three tackles and making six of his own. In 2002, he deflected two passes and made five solo tackles in ten games.
