= Jamel White =

American football player (born 1978)

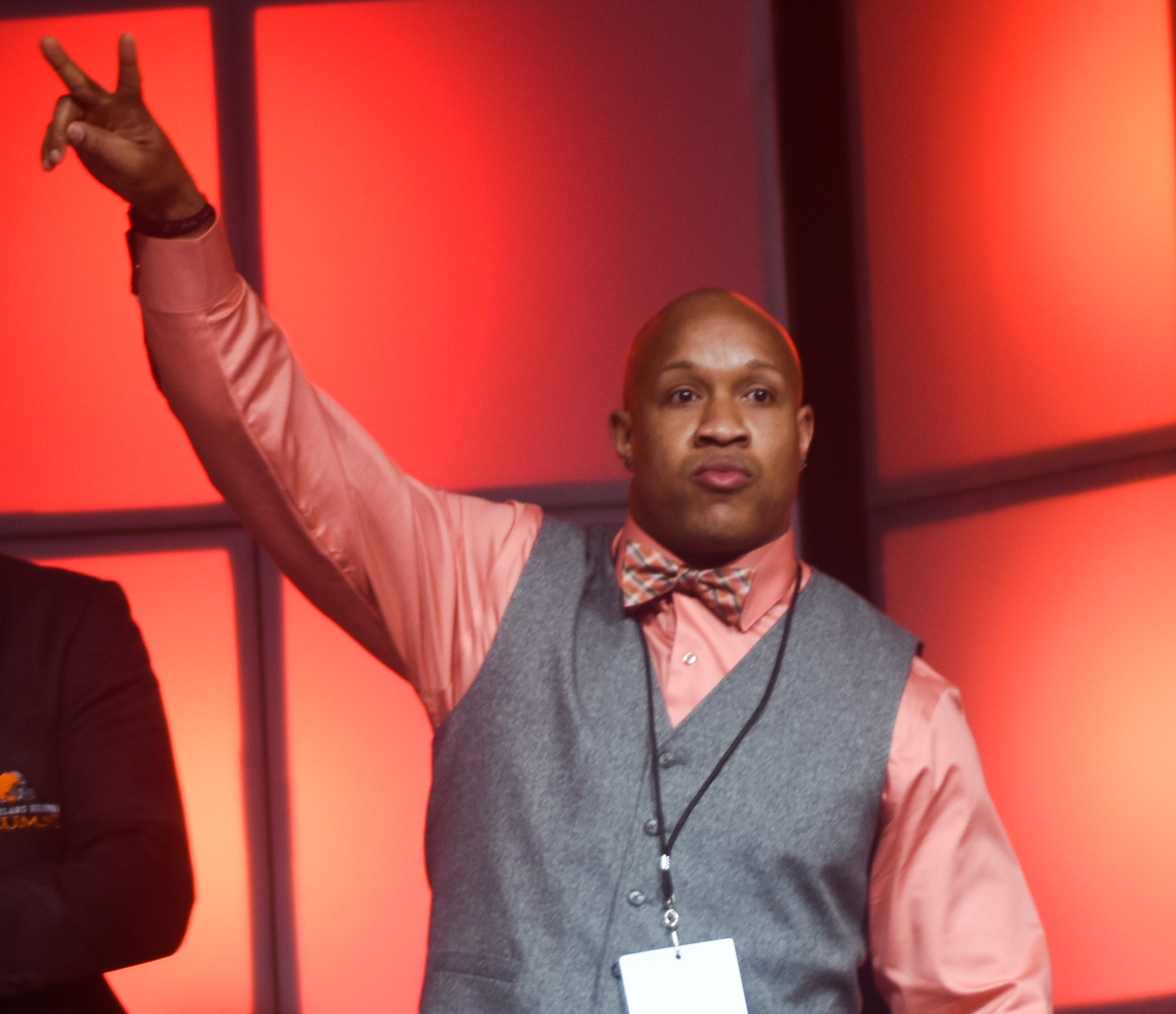
- White in 2015

No. 30
- Position: Running back

Personal information
- Born: February 11, 1978 (age 48); Los Angeles, California, U.S.
- Listed height: 5 ft 9 in (1.75 m)
- Listed weight: 222 lb (101 kg)

Career information
- High school: Palmdale (CA)
- College: South Dakota
- NFL draft: 2000: undrafted

Career history
- Indianapolis Colts (2000)*; Cleveland Browns (2000–2003); Tampa Bay Buccaneers (2004); Baltimore Ravens (2004); Detroit Lions (2005)*; Baltimore Ravens (2005); Toronto Argonauts (2007)
- * Offseason or practice squad member only

Career NFL statistics
- Rushing yards: 1,423
- Rushing average: 3.7
- Rushing touchdowns: 9
- Stats at Pro Football Reference

Jamel M. White (born February 11, 1978) is an American former professional football player who was a running back in the National Football League (NFL) He played college football for the South Dakota Coyotes. Whited played in the NFL for the Cleveland Browns and appeared in games for the Tampa Bay Buccaneers and Baltimore Ravens. He scored 11 touchdowns in his NFL career. He also played for the Canadian Football League (CFL) for the Toronto Argonauts. He currently coaches sprints for high school track at Riverside high school in Painesville Ohio.

On January 26, 2007, White signed with the Toronto Argonauts of the CFL. He was announced as the starter for the home opener on June 25, 2007, over incumbent John Avery. After appearing in three games, White was released by the Argonauts on August 19, 2007.

Played three seasons with the Cleveland Browns. Started in several different positions such as running back, Wide Receiver, and the kick and punt returner.
