= Henry Douglas (American football) =

American football player (born 1977)

Profile
- Position: Wide receiver

Personal information
- Born: March 3, 1977 (age 49); Brooklyn, New York, U.S.

Career information
- High school: Pinecrest (Southern Pines, North Carolina)
- College: North Carolina A&T
- NFL draft: 1999: undrafted

Career history
- Detroit Lions (1999–2001)*; Jacksonville Jaguars (2001–2003); Carolina Panthers (2003)*; Los Angeles Avengers (2004); Chicago Rush (2005); Columbus Destroyers (2006); Chicago Rush (2006)
- * Offseason or practice squad member only

Awards and highlights
- ArenaBowl champion (2006)

Henry Douglas III (born March 3, 1977) is an American former National Football League (NFL) and Arena Football League (AFL) offensive specialist (wide receiver/running back combination) for the Los Angeles Avengers, the Chicago Rush and the Columbus Destroyers.

== Early life ==
Douglas attended Pinecrest High School in Southern Pines, North Carolina, where he was a standout in football, basketball, and track. As a senior, he was a first-team All-Conference pick in football and basketball.

== College career ==
Henry Douglas played college football at North Carolina A&T.

== Professional career ==
Douglas entered the National Football League in 1999 when he was signed by the Detroit Lions as an undrafted free agent. From 1999 to 2003, he spent time with the Lions, the Jacksonville Jaguars, and the Carolina Panthers in training camp or on the practice squad. He made the Jaguars active roster in 2002 but did not play in a game.
