= Elvis Joseph =

Barbadian gridiron football player (born 1978)

No. 35
- Position: Running back

Personal information
- Born: August 30, 1978 (age 48); St. Michael, Barbados
- Listed height: 6 ft 1 in (1.85 m)
- Listed weight: 216 lb (98 kg)

Career information
- High school: John Ehret (Marrero, Louisiana, U.S.)
- College: Louisiana-Lafayette/Southern
- NFL draft: 2001: undrafted

Career history
- Jacksonville Jaguars (2001–2003); Edmonton Eskimos (2005)

Career NFL statistics
- Games played: 29
- Rushing yards: 294
- Rushing average: 4.3
- Rushing touchdowns: 2
- Stats at Pro Football Reference

Elvis Joseph (born August 30, 1978 in St. Michael, Barbados) is a former running back in the NFL. He played three years in the NFL from 2001 to 2003 for the Jacksonville Jaguars. He is distinguished as being the first Bajan to play in the National Football League.
