= Maurice Williams (offensive tackle) =

American football player (born 1979)

No. 74
- Positions: Guard, offensive tackle

Personal information
- Born: January 26, 1979 (age 47); Detroit, Michigan, U.S.
- Listed height: 6 ft 5 in (1.96 m)
- Listed weight: 302 lb (137 kg)

Career information
- High school: Pershing (Detroit)
- College: Michigan
- NFL draft: 2001: 2nd round, 43rd overall pick

Career history
- Jacksonville Jaguars (2001–2009); Detroit Lions (2009); Denver Broncos (2010)*
- * Offseason or practice squad member only

Awards and highlights
- National champion (1997)

Career NFL statistics
- Games played: 105
- Games started: 100
- Stats at Pro Football Reference

Maurice Carlos Williams (born January 26, 1979) is an American former professional football player who was a guard and offensive tackle in the National Football League (NFL). He played college football for the Michigan Wolverines and was selected by the Jacksonville Jaguars in the second round of the 2001 NFL draft.

== College career ==
Williams started every game as a senior at the University of Michigan after playing as a reserve for two years. He played in the Citrus Bowl and was an all-Big Ten Conference honorable mention as a senior in 2000.

== Professional career ==
Pre-draft measurables
| Height | Weight | Arm length | Hand span | 40-yard dash | Bench press |
|---|---|---|---|---|---|
| 6 ft 5 in (1.96 m) | 304 lb (138 kg) | 34 in (0.86 m) | 10 in (0.25 m) | 5.20 s | 24 reps |
All values from NFL Combine

=== Jacksonville Jaguars ===
The Jaguars drafted Williams in the second round of the 2001 NFL draft. In the 2007 season, Williams started two games at left tackle and eight games at right guard. For 2008, Williams was expected to start at right guard for the entire season, but he went down with an injury in the season opener and missed the rest of the year. On December 5, 2009, he was waived by the Jaguars.

=== Denver Broncos ===
Williams signed with the Denver Broncos on May 6, 2010. On June 4, the Broncos released Williams.

He and his wife, Reulonda, founded the Moe Williams Family Foundation, a nonprofit organization.
