= Stacey Mack =

American football player (born 1975)

No. 34
- Position: Running back

Personal information
- Born: June 26, 1975 (age 51); Orlando, Florida, U.S.
- Listed height: 6 ft 1 in (1.85 m)
- Listed weight: 240 lb (109 kg)

Career information
- High school: Boone (Orlando)
- College: Southwest Mississippi CC (1994–1995); Temple (1996–1998)
- NFL draft: 1999: undrafted

Career history
- Jacksonville Jaguars (1999–2002); Houston Texans (2003)
- Stats at Pro Football Reference

Stacey Lamar Mack (born June 26, 1975) is an American former professional football player who was a running back for five seasons in the National Football League (NFL) for the Jacksonville Jaguars and the Houston Texans. He had attended Southwest Mississippi Community College in Summit, MS before transferring to Temple University. Stacey was signed as an undrafted free agent by the Jaguars in 1999.
