= 2003 Cleveland Browns season =

55th season in franchise history

- Owner: Randy Lerner
- Head coach: Butch Davis
- Home stadium: Cleveland Browns Stadium

Results
- Record: 5–11
- Division place: 4th AFC North
- Playoffs: Did not qualify
- Pro Bowlers: None

The 2003 Cleveland Browns season was the franchise's 55th season as a professional sports franchise and its 51st season as a member of the National Football League. The Browns were unable to replicate the success from the previous season, and they ended up winning only five games. They failed to return to the playoffs. This season would begin a stretch, which was unbroken until the 2020 season, in which the Browns would not make it to the playoffs in any capacity. Defensive Coordinator Foge Fazio was let go following their wild card loss to the Pittsburgh Steelers, and Dave Campo was hired as Butch Davis had called Campo the day he was fired from the Dallas Cowboys as the two had previously served on Jimmy Johnson’s staff.

== Offseason ==
=== 2003 NFL draft ===
Draft order		Player name	Position	College
Round	Pick	Player name	Position	College
1	21	Jeff Faine	Center	Notre Dame
2	52	Chaun Thompson	Linebacker	West Texas A&M
3	84	Chris Crocker	Safety	Marshall
4	115	Lee Suggs	Running back	Virginia Tech
5	142	Ryan Pontbriand	Long snapper	Rice
5	152	Michael Lehan	Cornerback	Minnesota
6	195	Antonio Garay	Defensive end	Boston College

=== Undrafted free agents ===
2003 undrafted free agents of note
Player	Position	College
Leigh Bodden	Cornerback	Duquesne
Enoch DeMar	Guard	Indiana
Nate Hybl	Quarterback	Oklahoma
Israel Idonije	Defensive end	Manitoba

== Personnel ==
2003 Cleveland Browns staff
Front office: Owner and chairman – Randy Lerner; President and chief executive officer – Carmen Policy; Director of Football Development – Pete Garcia; Director of Pro Personnel - Jeremy Green; Player Personnel Assistant - Yogi Jones; Pro Personnel Coordinator - Steve Sabo; Director of college personnel – Phil Neri; Head coaches: Head coach and General Manager – Butch Davis; Offensive coaches: Offensive coordinator – Bruce Arians; Quarterbacks – Carl Smith; Running backs – Todd McNair; Wide receivers – Terry Robiskie; Tight ends – Steve Hagen; Offensive line – Larry Zierlein; Assistant offensive line – Mike Sullivan	Defensive coaches: Defensive coordinator – Dave Campo; Defensive line – Andre Patterson; Linebackers – Clancy Pendergast; Defensive Backs – Chuck Pagano; Defensive nickel package – Todd Bowles; Defensive assistant – Phillip Banko; Special teams coaches: Special teams coordinator – Jerry Rosburg; Strength and conditioning: Head strength and conditioning – Buddy Morris; Assistant strength and conditioning – Rob Phillips

== Roster ==
2003 Cleveland Browns roster
Quarterbacks (QB): 2 Tim Couch; 10 Kelly Holcomb; 8 Nate Hybl; Running backs (RB): 26 Nick Maddox; 44 Lee Suggs; 30 Jamel White; Wide receivers (WR): 87 André Davis KR; 88 Frisman Jackson; 85 C. J. Jones; 84 Andre King KR; 81 Quincy Morgan; 86 Dennis Northcutt PR; Tight ends (TE): 89 Darnell Sanders; 49 Keith Heinrich; 83 Chad Mustard	Offensive linemen (OL): 70 Enoch DeMar G; 67 Melvin Fowler C/G; 73 Joaquin Gonzalez T; 60 Shaun O'Hara G; 71 Scot Osborne T; 62 Craig Osika G; 79 Barry Stokes T; 72 Ryan Tucker T; 66 Paul Zukauskas G; Defensive linemen (DL): 91 Felipe Claybrooks DE; 96 Kenard Lang DE; 93 Michael Myers DT; 98 John Nix DT; 78 Tyrone Rogers DE; 99 Orpheus Roye DT; 94 Gerard Warren DT; 90 Mark Word DE/DT	Linebackers (LB): 59 Kevin Bentley OLB; 52 Brant Boyer OLB; 56 Sherrod Coates; 54 Andra Davis MLB; 55 Barry Gardner MLB; 58 Ben Taylor OLB; 51 Chaun Thompson OLB; 53 Mason Unck OLB; Defensive backs (DB): 28 Leigh Bodden CB; 25 Chris Crocker FS; 24 Robert Griffith SS; 37 Anthony Henry CB; 22 Michael Jameson SS; 39 Michael Lehan CB; 20 Earl Little FS; 33 Daylon McCutcheon CB; 27 Roosevelt Williams CB; Special teams (ST): 5 Brett Conway K; 8 Derrick Frost P; 17 Chris Gardocki P; 64 Ryan Pontbriand LS	Practice squad: 61 Troy Andrew G; 36 Billy Blanchard FB; 69 Corey Jackson DE; 38 David Young S; Reserve: 68 Chad Beasley G (IR); 34 R. J. Bowers FB (IR); 92 Courtney Brown DE (IR); 4 Phil Dawson K (IR); 50 Jeff Faine C (IR); 95 Antonio Garay DT (IR); 31 William Green RB (Susp.); 82 Steve Heiden TE (IR); 29 James Jackson RB (IR); 74 Chuck Klabo T (NF-Inj.); 97 Alvin McKinley DT (IR); 40 Ben Miller; 21 Lewis Sanders CB (IR); 80 Aaron Shea TE (IR); 77 Ross Verba T (IR); Rookies in italics 53 active, 15 reserve, 4 practice squad

== Regular season ==
=== Schedule ===
Apart from their AFC North division games, the Browns played against the AFC West and NFC West according to the NFL’s conference rotation, and played the Colts and Patriots based on 2002 standings in their respective AFC divisions.

Week	Date	Opponent	Result	Record	Attendance	Venue	Recap
1	September 7	Indianapolis Colts	**L** 6–9	0–1	73,358	Cleveland Browns Stadium	Recap
2	September 14	at **Baltimore Ravens**	**L** 13–33	0–2	69,473	M&T Bank Stadium	Recap
3	September 21	at San Francisco 49ers	**W** 13–12	1–2	67,412	3Com Park	Recap
4	September 28	**Cincinnati Bengals**	**L** 14–21	1–3	73,428	Cleveland Browns Stadium	Recap
5	October 5	at **Pittsburgh Steelers**	**W** 33–13	2–3	64,595	Heinz Field	Recap
6	October 12	Oakland Raiders	**W** 13–7	3–3	73,318	Cleveland Browns Stadium	Recap
7	October 19	San Diego Chargers	**L** 20–26	3–4	73,238	Cleveland Browns Stadium	Recap
8	October 26	at New England Patriots	**L** 3–9	3–5	68,436	Gillette Stadium	Recap
9	Bye						
10	November 9	at Kansas City Chiefs	**L** 20–41	3–6	78,560	Arrowhead Stadium	Recap
11	November 16	Arizona Cardinals	**W** 44–6	4–6	72,908	Cleveland Browns Stadium	Recap
12	November 23	**Pittsburgh Steelers**	**L** 6–13	4–7	73,658	Cleveland Browns Stadium	Recap
13	November 30	at Seattle Seahawks	**L** 7–34	4–8	64,680	Seahawks Stadium	Recap
14	December 8	St. Louis Rams	**L** 20–26	4–9	73,108	Cleveland Browns Stadium	Recap
15	December 14	at Denver Broncos	**L** 20–23 (OT)	4–10	75,358	Invesco Field at Mile High	Recap
16	December 21	**Baltimore Ravens**	**L** 0–35	4–11	72,548	Cleveland Browns Stadium	Recap
17	December 28	at **Cincinnati Bengals**	**W** 22–14	5–11	65,362	Paul Brown Stadium	Recap
Note: Intra-divisional opponents are in **bold** text.

=== Standings ===
AFC North
	W	L	T	PCT	DIV	CONF	PF	PA	STK
^{(4)} Baltimore Ravens	10	6	0	.625	4–2	7–5	391	281	W2
Cincinnati Bengals	8	8	0	.500	3–3	6–6	346	384	L2
Pittsburgh Steelers	6	10	0	.375	3–3	5–7	300	327	L1
Cleveland Browns	5	11	0	.313	2–4	3–9	254	322	W1

== Game summaries ==
=== Week 2: at Baltimore ===
Week 2: Cleveland Browns at Baltimore Ravens – Game summary

Quarter	1	2	3	4	Total
Browns	0	3	10	0	13
Ravens	10	6	0	17	33

at M&T Bank Stadium, Baltimore

- Date: September 14
- Game time: 1:00 p.m. EST
- Game weather: 75 °F (23.9 °C), relative humidity 83%, wind 7 miles per hour (11 km/h; 6.1 kn)
- Game attendance: 69,473
- Referee: Tom White
- TV announcers (CBS): Tim Brando (play–by–play), Spencer Tillman (color commentator)

Browns linebacker Andra Davis telephoned Ravens running back Jamal Lewis before the game and stated he wanted Lewis to carry the ball at least thirty times in their upcoming matchup. “If that happens, it's going to be a career day’, Lewis replied. Lewis then erupted to 295 rushing yards, breaking the record previously held by Corey Dillon in 2000 as the Browns fell 33–13.

=== Week 11: vs. Arizona ===
Week 11: Arizona Cardinals at Cleveland Browns – Game summary

Quarter	1	2	3	4	Total
Cardinals	0	3	3	0	6
Browns	10	10	14	10	44

at Cleveland Browns Stadium, Cleveland

- Date: November 16
- Game time: 1:00 p.m. EST
- Game weather: 43 °F (6.1 °C), relative humidity 89%, wind 5 miles per hour (8.0 km/h; 4.3 kn)
- Game attendance: 72,908
- Referee: Ron Winter
- TV announcers (Fox): Scott Graham (play–by–play), Dale Hellestrae (color commentator) and Tony Rizzo (sideline reporter)

Game information

First quarter

- CLE (9:06) – Dawson 34 yard field goal
  Browns 3, Cardinals 0
- CLE (2:57) – Davis 4 yard pass from Holcomb (Dawson kick)
  Browns 10, Cardinals 0

Second quarter

- CLE (11:16) – Dawson 24 yard field goal
  Browns 13, Cardinals 0
- CLE (4:14) – Northcutt 1 yard pass from Holcomb (Dawson kick)
  Browns 20, Cardinals 0
- ARI (0:55) – Rackers 42 yard field goal
  Browns 20, Cardinals 3

Third quarter

- ARI (9:55) – Rackers 26 yard field goal
  Browns 20, Cardinals 6
- CLE (6:59) – Jackson 4 yard rush (Dawson kick)
  Browns 27, Cardinals 6
- CLE (2:56) – Morgan 68 yard pass from Holcomb (Dawson kick)
  Browns 34, Cardinals 6

Fourth quarter

- CLE (14:20) – Jackson 4 yard rush (Dawson kick)
  Browns 41, Cardinals 6
- CLE (8:57) – Dawson 29 yard field goal
  Browns 44, Cardinals 6

Top passers

- ARI – Jeff Blake 9/21, 121 yds, 1 INT
- CLE – Kelly Holcomb 29/35, 392 yds, 3 TD

Top rushers

- ARI – Marcel Shipp 9 carr, 23 yds
- CLE – James Jackson 19 carr, 45 yds, 2 TD

Top receivers

- ARI – Anquan Boldin 4 rec, 86 yds
- CLE – André Davis 7 rec, 117 yds, 1 TD

Turnovers

- ARI – 4
- CLE – 0
