= 2002 Cleveland Browns season =

54th season in franchise history

- Owner: Al Lerner (Until October 2, 2002); Randy Lerner (Took position October 2, 2002)
- Head coach: Butch Davis
- Home stadium: Cleveland Browns Stadium

Results
- Record: 9–7
- Division place: 2nd AFC North
- Playoffs: Lost Wild Card Playoffs (at Steelers) 33–36
- Pro Bowlers: none

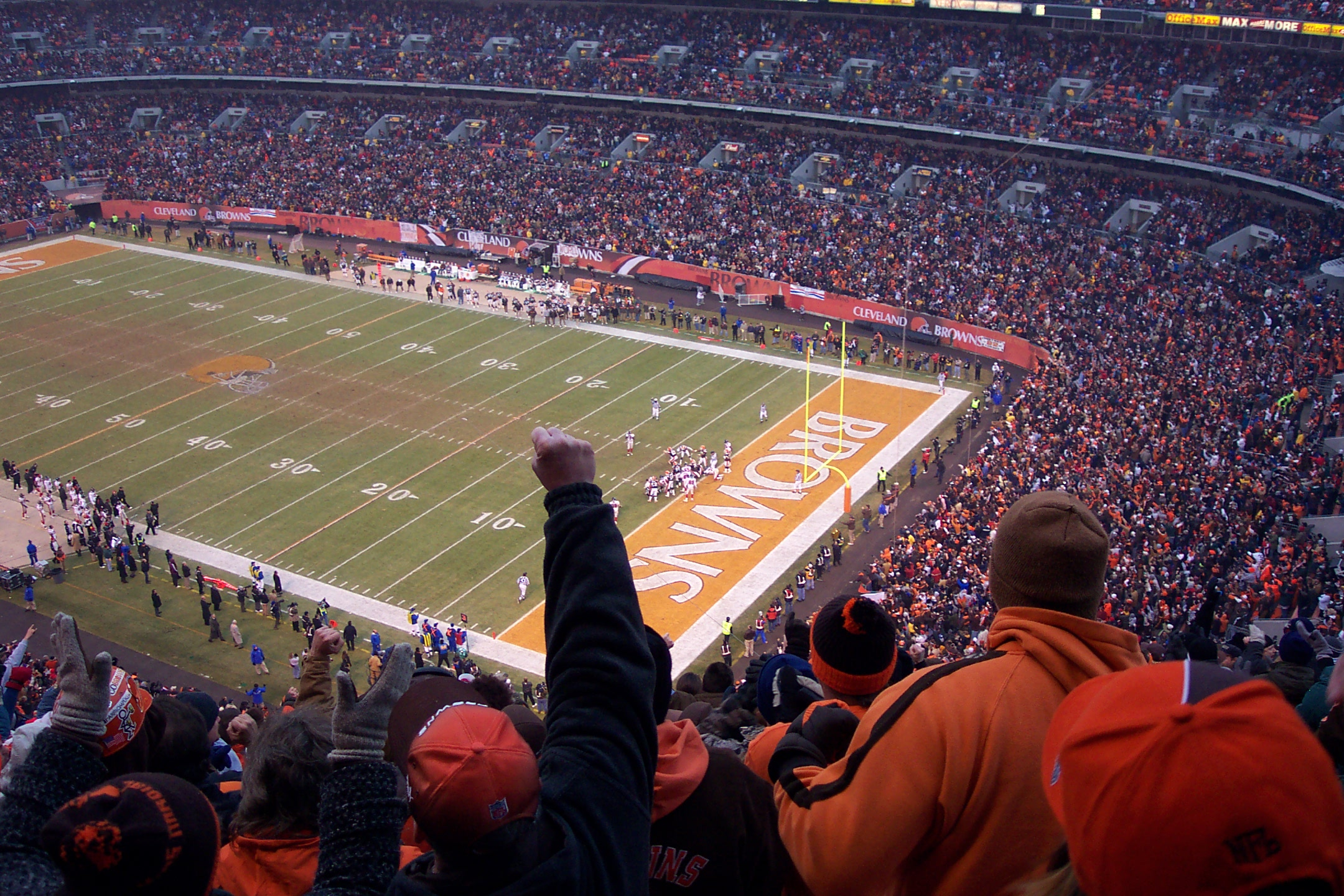
Cleveland Browns vs. Atlanta Falcons, 2002

The 2002 season was the Cleveland Browns' 54th as a professional sports franchise, their 50th as a member of the National Football League, and the second season under head coach Butch Davis. During the offseason Dwight Clark had resigned as general manager, and Butch Davis became the de facto general manager. Also during a preseason matchup against the Minnesota Vikings at the Metrodome, the Browns lost pro bowl linebacker Jamir Miller to a ruptured Achilles tendon injury forcing him to miss the entire regular season.

In their opener against the Kansas City Chiefs, linebacker Dwayne Rudd cost the Browns a victory when he threw his helmet in celebration unaware the play was still going on, incurring an unsportsmanlike conduct penalty. Because the clock expired during the play the Browns' unsportsmanlike conduct occurred on, per NFL rules, the Chiefs were given one untimed down. Chiefs' kicker Morten Andersen made the 30-yard field goal to win the game.

The Browns made their first playoff appearance since their re-activation. It was only the Browns' fourth year since returning to the league effectively as an expansion team, and their first winning season. The Browns faced the Pittsburgh Steelers in the wild card round at Heinz Field. Despite a strong start with a 24–7 lead late in the third quarter, the Steelers would ultimately bounce back erasing a 17 point deficit, causing the Browns to lose 36–33. The Browns owner Al Lerner stepped down on October 2 and died on October 23, 2002, from brain cancer. His son, Randy Lerner took over the team until 2012. The Browns wore a patch with the initials "AL" for the remainder of the season and became a fixture on their uniforms to commemorate Lerner. After 2013 the initials were removed from the uniforms when Jimmy Haslam became owner of the franchise. The Browns would not make the playoffs again until 2020.

== Offseason ==
Additions	Subtractions
T Ryan Tucker (Rams)	LB Wali Rainer (Jaguars)
FS Robert Griffith (Vikings)	T Roman Oben (Buccaneers)
LB Earl Holmes (Steelers)	DE Greg Spires (Buccaneers)
DE Kenard Lang (Redskins)	DE Keith McKenzie (Bears)
LB Darren Hambrick (Panthers)	

=== 2002 expansion draft ===
Cleveland Browns selected during the expansion draft
Round	Overall	Name	Position	Expansion team
—	11	Jeremy McKinney	Guard	Houston Texans

=== 2002 NFL draft ===
2002 Cleveland Browns draft
Round	Pick	Player	Position	College	Notes
1	16	William Green	Running back	Boston College	
2	47	André Davis	Wide receiver	Virginia Tech	
3	76	Melvin Fowler	Center	Maryland	
4	101	Kevin Bentley	Linebacker	Northwestern	
4	111	Ben Taylor	Linebacker	Virginia Tech	
4	122	Darnell Sanders	Tight end	Ohio State	
5	141	Andra Davis	Linebacker	Florida	
7	227	Joaquin Gonzalez	Offensive tackle	Miami (FL)	
Made roster

=== Undrafted free agents ===
2002 undrafted free agents of note
Player	Position	College
Dimitrius Breedlove	Wide receiver	Evangel
Konrad Dean	Offensive Lineman	Akron
Frisman Jackson	Wide receiver	Western Illinois
Michael Josiah	Defensive end	Louisville
Ben Miller	Running back	Air Force
Qasim Mitchell	Offensive Lineman	North Carolina A&T
Kalvin Pearson	Safety	Grambling State
Calvin Spears	Defensive back	Grambling State

== Personnel ==
2002 Cleveland Browns staff
Front office: Owner and chairman – Randy Lerner; President and chief executive officer – Carmen Policy; Director of Football Development – Pete Garcia; Pro Personnel Coordinator - Jeremy Green; Pro Personnel Coordinator - Steve Sabo; Director of college personnel – Phil Neri; Head coaches: Head coach and General Manager – Butch Davis; Offensive coaches: Offensive coordinator – Bruce Arians; Quarterbacks – Carl Smith; Running backs – Todd McNair; Wide receivers – Terry Robiskie; Tight ends – Steve Hagen; Offensive line – Larry Zierlein; Assistant offensive line – Mike Sullivan	Defensive coaches: Defensive coordinator – Foge Fazio; Defensive line – Ray Hamilton; Linebackers – Keith Butler; Defensive Backs – Chuck Pagano; Defensive assistant – Phillip Banko; Defensive assistant – Todd Bowles; Special teams coaches: Special teams coordinator – Jerry Rosburg; Strength and conditioning: Head strength and conditioning – Tim Jorgensen; Assistant strength and conditioning – Rob Phillips

== Roster ==
2002 Cleveland Browns roster
Quarterbacks (QB): 12 Josh Booty; 2 Tim Couch; 10 Kelly Holcomb; Running backs (RB): 34 R. J. Bowers FB; 31 William Green; 29 James Jackson; 30 Jamel White; Wide receivers (WR): 87 André Davis; 88 Frisman Jackson; 85 Kevin Johnson; 84 Andre King KR; 81 Quincy Morgan; 86 Dennis Northcutt PR; Tight ends (TE): 83 Mark Campbell; 82 Steve Heiden; 89 Darnell Sanders	Offensive linemen (OL): 68 Chad Beasley G/T; 67 Melvin Fowler C; 73 Joaquin Gonzalez T; 60 Shaun O'Hara C/G; 79 Barry Stokes G; 72 Ryan Tucker T; 77 Ross Verba T; 64 Dave Wohlabaugh C; 66 Paul Zukauskas G; Defensive linemen (DL): 96 Kenard Lang DE; 70 Alvin McKinley DT; 78 Tyrone Rogers DE; 99 Orpheus Roye DT; 93 Cedric Scott DE; 94 Gerard Warren DT; 90 Mark Word DE	Linebackers (LB): 59 Kevin Bentley OLB; 52 Brant Boyer; 54 Andra Davis MLB; 56 Darren Hambrick OLB; 50 Earl Holmes MLB; 51 Lenoy Jones MLB; 57 Dwayne Rudd OLB; Defensive backs (DB): 36 Chris Akins FS; 23 Devin Bush FS; 25 Corey Fuller CB; 24 Robert Griffith SS; 37 Anthony Henry CB/S; 22 Michael Jameson SS; 20 Earl Little S; 33 Daylon McCutcheon CB; 21 Lewis Sanders; 42 Raymond Walls CB; Special teams (ST): 4 Phil Dawson K; 17 Chris Gardocki P; 97 Ryan Kuehl LS	Practice squad: 75 Damian Gregory DT; 65 Chad Mustard T; 43 Kalvin Pearson CB/S; 71 Chad Ward G; 53 Jamal White LB; Reserve: 18 Dimitrius Breedlove WR (IR); 92 Courtney Brown DE (IR); 74 Felipe Claybrooks DE (IR); 49 Chris Eitzmann TE (IR); 28 J. J. Johnson RB (IR); 71 Michael Josiah DE (IR); 40 Ben Miller; 95 Jamir Miller LB (IR); 61 Qasim Mitchell G/T (IR); 48 Rod Monroe TE (IR); 38 Earthwind Moreland CB (IR); 98 Thomas Pittman DT (NF-Inj.); 80 Aaron Shea TE (IR); 58 Ben Taylor LB (IR); Rookies in italics 52 active, 14 reserve, 5 practice squad

== Regular season ==
=== Schedule ===
Apart from their AFC North division games, the Browns played against the AFC South and NFC South according to the NFL's new conference rotation, and played the Chiefs and Jets based on 2001 standings with respect to the newly aligned divisions.

Week	Date	Opponent	Result	Record	Venue	Attendance
1	September 8	Kansas City Chiefs	**L** 39–40	0–1	Cleveland Browns Stadium	72,938
2	September 15	**Cincinnati Bengals**	**W** 20–7	1–1	Cleveland Browns Stadium	73,358
3	September 22	at Tennessee Titans	**W** 31–28 (OT)	2–1	Adelphia Coliseum	68,804
4	September 29	at **Pittsburgh Steelers**	**L** 13–16 (OT)	2–2	Heinz Field	62,864
5	October 6	**Baltimore Ravens**	**L** 21–26	2–3	Cleveland Browns Stadium	73,688
6	October 13	at Tampa Bay Buccaneers	**L** 3–17	2–4	Raymond James Stadium	65,625
7	October 20	Houston Texans	**W** 34–17	3–4	Cleveland Browns Stadium	73,248
8	October 27	at New York Jets	**W** 24–21	4–4	Giants Stadium	78,502
9	November 3	**Pittsburgh Steelers**	**L** 20–23	4–5	Cleveland Browns Stadium	73,718
10	Bye					
11	November 17	at **Cincinnati Bengals**	**W** 27–20	5–5	Paul Brown Stadium	64,060
12	November 24	at New Orleans Saints	**W** 24–15	6–5	Louisiana Superdome	68,295
13	December 1	Carolina Panthers	**L** 6–13	6–6	Cleveland Browns Stadium	72,718
14	December 8	at Jacksonville Jaguars	**W** 21–20	7–6	Alltel Stadium	46,267
15	December 15	Indianapolis Colts	**L** 23–28	7–7	Cleveland Browns Stadium	73,098
16	December 22	at **Baltimore Ravens**	**W** 14–13	8–7	M&T Bank Stadium	68,348
17	December 29	Atlanta Falcons	**W** 24–16	9–7	Cleveland Browns Stadium	73,528
Note: Intra-division opponents are in **bold** text.

=== Game summaries ===
==== Week 1: vs. Kansas City Chiefs ====
Week 1: Kansas City Chiefs (0–0) at Cleveland Browns (0–0) – Game summary

Quarter	1	2	3	4	Total
**Chiefs**	7	7	3	23	**40**
Browns	6	14	7	12	**39**

at Cleveland Browns Stadium, Cleveland, Ohio

- Date: September 8
- Game time: 1:00 p.m. EDT
- Game weather: Sunny, 86 °F (30 °C)
- Game attendance: 72,938
- Referee: Ron Blum
- TV announcers (CBS): Ian Eagle, Dan Dierdorf, and Bonnie Bernstein
- Recap, Game Book

Game information

**First quarter**

- CLE – Phil Dawson 20-yard field goal, 12:36. Browns 3–0. **Drive: 4 plays, 3 yards, 0:54.**
- KC – Tony Gonzalez 17-yard pass from Trent Green (Morten Andersen kick), 8:21. Chiefs 7–3. **Drive: 8 plays, 73 yards, 4:15.**
- CLE – Phil Dawson 32-yard field goal, 3:16. Chiefs 7–6. **Drive: 10 plays, 55 yards, 5:05.**

**Second quarter**

- CLE – Dennis Northcutt 43-yard pass from Kelly Holcomb (Phil Dawson kick), 12:19. Browns 13–7. **Drive: 2 plays, 65 yards, 0:48.**
- KC – Priest Holmes 5-yard run (Morten Andersen kick), 8:41. Chiefs 14–13. **Drive: 6 plays, 83 yards, 3:38.**
- CLE – Quincy Morgan 33-yard pass from Kevin Johnson (Phil Dawson kick), 5:38. Browns 20–14. **Drive: 5 plays, 71 yards, 3:03.**

**Third quarter**

- CLE – André Davis 4-yard pass from Kelly Holcomb (Phil Dawson kick), 7:09. Browns 27–14. **Drive: 14 plays, 80 yards, 7:51.**
- KC – Morten Andersen 33-yard field goal, 2:04. Browns 27–17. **Drive: 9 plays, 42 yards, 5:05.**

**Fourth quarter**

- CLE – Phil Dawson 34-yard field goal, 11:19. Browns 30–17. **Drive: 8 plays, 50 yards, 3:27.**
- KC – Priest Holmes 26-yard run (Morten Andersen kick), 9:06. Browns 30–24. **Drive: 4 plays, 56 yards, 2:13.**
- KC – Priest Holmes 15-yard run (Morten Anderson kick), 8:05. Chiefs 31–30. **Drive: 1 play, 15 yards, 0:07.**
- CLE – Quincy Morgan 44-yard pass from Kelly Holcomb (run failed), 5:52. Browns 36–31. **Drive: 5 plays, 66 yards, 2:13.**
- KC – Priest Holmes 7-yard run (run failed), 3:05. Chiefs 37–36. **Drive: 6 plays, 74 yards, 2:47.**
- CLE – Phil Dawson 41-yard field goal, 0:29. Browns 39–37. **Drive: 7 plays, 45 yards, 2:36.**
- KC – Morten Andersen 30-yard field goal, 0:00. Chiefs 40–39. **Drive: 4 plays, 53 yards, 0:29.**

**Top passers**

- KC – Trent Green – 20/29, 276 yards, TD, INT
- CLE – Kelly Holcomb – 27/39, 326 yards, 3 TD

**Top rushers**

- KC – Priest Holmes – 22 rushes, 122 yards, 4 TD
- CLE – Jamel White – 12 rushes, 42 yards

**Top receivers**

- KC – Eddie Kennison – 4 receptions, 120 yards
- CLE – Quincy Morgan – 9 receptions, 151 yards, 2 TD

This game became notable for linebacker Dwayne Rudd tossing his helmet onto the ground under the assumption he had sacked quarterback Trent Green, who had actually released the ball prior to hitting the ground. As a result, the Browns got hit with an unsportsmanlike conduct penalty, which allowed the Chiefs to score the game-winning field goal.

==== Week 8: at New York Jets ====
Week 8: Cleveland Browns (3–4) at New York Jets(2–4) – Game summary

Quarter	1	2	3	4	Total
**Browns**	3	3	15	3	**24**
Jets	14	7	0	0	**21**

at Giants Stadium, East Rutherford, New Jersey

- Game time: 1:05 p.m.
- Game weather: Mostly cloudy, 57 °F (14 °C)
- Game attendance: 78,502
- Referee: Bob McElwee (95)
- TV announcers (CBS): Kevin Harlan, Randy Cross, and Beasley Reece
- Recap, Game Book

Game information

**First quarter**

- NYJ – Santana Moss 63-yard punt return (John Hall kick), 14:21. Jets 7–0.
- CLE – Phil Dawson 23-yard field goal, 8:12. Jets 7–3. **Drive: 10 plays, 74 yards, 6:09.**
- NYJ – Laveranues Coles 37-yard pass from Chad Pennington (John Hall kick), 5:57. Jets 14–3. **Drive: 5 plays, 70 yards, 2:15.**

**Second quarter**

- NYJ – Wayne Chrebet 8-yard pass from Chad Pennington (John Hall kick), 14:23. Jets 21–3. **Drive: 8 plays, 62 yards, 4:22.**
- CLE – Phil Dawson 26-yard field goal, 7:29. Jets 21–6. **Drive: 7 plays, 41 yards, 3:39.**

**Third quarter**

- CLE – Mark Campbell 5-yard pass from Tim Couch (Phil Dawson kick), 4:40. Jets 21–13. **Drive: 11 plays, 60 yards, 4:41.**
- CLE – André Davis 4-yard pass from Tim Couch (Tim Couch–Dennis Northcutt pass), 0:09. Tied 21–21. **Drive: 3 plays, 11 yards, 1:26.**

**Fourth quarter**

- CLE – Phil Dawson 35-yard field goal, 3:30. Browns 24–21. **Drive: 14 plays, 61 yards, 8:33.**

**Top passers**

- CLE – Tim Couch – 32/48, 294 yards, 2 TD
- NYJ – Chad Pennington – 19/26, 183 yards, 2 TD, INT

**Top rushers**

- CLE – Jamel White – 14 rushes, 25 yards
- NYJ – Curtis Martin – 18 rushes, 65 yards

**Top receivers**

- CLE – Kevin Johnson – 5 receptions, 73 yards
- NYJ – Laveranues Coles – 5 receptions, 61 yards, TD

=== Standings ===
==== Division ====
AFC North
	W	L	T	PCT	DIV	CONF	PF	PA	STK
^{(3)} Pittsburgh Steelers	10	5	1	.656	6–0	8–4	390	345	W3
^{(6)} Cleveland Browns	9	7	0	.563	3–3	7–5	344	320	W2
Baltimore Ravens	7	9	0	.438	3–3	7–5	316	354	L2
Cincinnati Bengals	2	14	0	.125	0–6	1–11	279	456	L1

==== Conference ====
AFC
#	Team	Division	W	L	T	PCT	DIV	CONF	SOS	SOV
**Division leaders**
1 (Note: Oakland finished ahead of Tennessee based on head-to-head victory.)	Oakland Raiders	West	11	5	0	.688	4–2	9–3	.529	.531
2	Tennessee Titans	South	11	5	0	.688	6–0	9–3	.479	.474
3	Pittsburgh Steelers	North	10	5	1	.656	6–0	8–4	.486	.451
4 (Note: N.Y. Jets finished ahead of New England based on win percentage in common games (8–4 to 7–5) after both finished ahead of Miami based on division record (4–2 to 2–4).)	New York Jets	East	9	7	0	.563	4–2	6–6	.500	.500
**Wild Cards**
5	Indianapolis Colts	South	10	6	0	.625	4–2	8–4	.479	.400
6 (Note: Cleveland finished ahead of Denver and New England based on conference record (7–5 vs 5–7/6–6))	Cleveland Browns	North	9	7	0	.563	3–3	7–5	.486	.413
**Did not qualify for the postseason**
7 (Note: Denver finished ahead of New England based on head-to-head victory.)	Denver Broncos	West	9	7	0	.563	3–3	5–7	.527	.486
8 (Note: New England finished ahead of Miami based on division record (4–2 to 2–4).)	New England Patriots	East	9	7	0	.563	4–2	6–6	.525	.455
9	Miami Dolphins	East	9	7	0	.563	2–4	7–5	.508	.486
10 (Note: Buffalo finished ahead of San Diego based on head-to-head victory.)	Buffalo Bills	East	8	8	0	.500	2–4	5–7	.473	.352
11 (Note: San Diego finished ahead of Kansas City based on division record (3–3 to 2–4).)	San Diego Chargers	West	8	8	0	.500	3–3	6–6	.492	.453
12	Kansas City Chiefs	West	8	8	0	.500	2–4	6–6	.527	.516
13	Baltimore Ravens	North	7	9	0	.438	3–3	7–5	.506	.384
14	Jacksonville Jaguars	South	6	10	0	.375	1–5	4–8	.506	.438
15	Houston Texans	South	4	12	0	.250	1–5	2–10	.518	.492
16	Cincinnati Bengals	North	2	14	0	.125	0–6	1–11	.537	.406
**Tiebreakers** (Note: When breaking ties for three or more teams under the NFL's rules, they are first broken within divisions, then comparing only the highest ranked remaining team from each division.)

== Postseason ==
Round	Date	Opponent (seed)	Result	Record	Venue	Attendance	Recap
AFC Wild Card	January 5, 2003	at Pittsburgh Steelers (3)	L 33–36	0–1	Heinz Field	62,595	Recap

=== Game summaries ===
AFC Wild Card: (#6) Cleveland Browns at (#3) Pittsburgh Steelers – Game Summary

Quarter	1	2	3	4	Total
Browns	7	10	7	9	33
Steelers	0	7	7	22	36

at Heinz Field, Pittsburgh

- Date: January 5, 2003
- Game time: 1:00 p.m. EST
- Game weather: Light snow, 27 °F (−3 °C)
- Game attendance: 62,595
- Referee: Bill Carollo (63)
- TV announcers (CBS): Greg Gumbel, Phil Simms and Armen Keteyian
- Recap, Game Book

Game information

First quarter

- CLE – William Green 1-yard run (Phil Dawson kick), 13:44. Browns 7–0. Drive: 4 plays, 80 yards, 1:16.

Second quarter

- CLE – Dennis Northcutt 32-yard pass from Kelly Holcomb (Phil Dawson kick), 14:28. Browns 14–0. Drive: 1 play, 32 yards, 0:06.
- PIT – Antwaan Randle El 66-yard punt return (Jeff Reed kick), 9:35. Browns 14–7.
- CLE – Phil Dawson 31-yard field goal, 0:49. Browns 17–7. Drive: 10 plays, 45 yards, 4:24.

Third quarter

- CLE – Dennis Northcutt 15-yard pass from Kelly Holcomb (Phil Dawson kick), 12:11. Browns 24–7. Drive: 3 plays, 14 yards, 0:49.
- PIT – Plaxico Burress 6-yard pass from Tommy Maddox (Jeff Reed kick), 3:50. Browns 24–14. Drive: 10 plays, 71 yards, 3:45.

Fourth quarter

- CLE – Phil Dawson 24-yard field goal, 14:52. Browns 27–14. Drive: 8 plays, 64 yards, 3:58.
- PIT – Jerame Tuman 3-yard pass from Tommy Maddox (Jeff Reed kick), 12:28. Browns 27–21. Drive: 6 plays, 65 yards, 2:24.
- CLE – André Davis 22-yard pass from Kelly Holcomb (pass failed), 10:17. Browns 33–21. Drive: 5 plays, 61 yards, 2:11.
- PIT – Hines Ward 5-yard pass from Tommy Maddox (Jeff Reed kick), 3:06. Browns 33–28. Drive: 10 plays, 77 yards, 2:24.
- PIT – Chris Fuamatu-Ma'afala 3-yard run (Tommy Maddox–Jerame Tuman pass), 0:54. Steelers 36–33. Drive: 6 plays, 61 yards, 1:41.

Top passers

- CLE – Kelly Holcomb – 26/43, 429 yards, 3 TD, INT
- PIT – Tommy Maddox – 30/48, 367 yards, 3 TD, 2 INT

Top rushers

- CLE – William Green – 25 rushes, 30 yards, TD
- PIT – Amos Zereoué – 13 rushes, 73 yards

Top receivers

- CLE – Kevin Johnson – 4 receptions, 140 yards
- PIT – Hines Ward – 11 receptions, 104 yards, TD

An amazing performance from Browns quarterback Kelly Holcomb was overshadowed by journeyman quarterback Tommy Maddox, who led the Steelers to 29 second-half points to overcome a 17-point deficit. A 3-yard touchdown run by Chris Fuamatu-Maʻafala with 54 seconds left capped the game-winning 58-yard drive.

On the third play of the game, Holcomb completed an 83-yard pass to Kevin Johnson at the Steelers 1-yard line, setting up William Green's 1-yard touchdown run and giving the Browns a 7–0 lead after just 1:16 had elapsed in the game. Most of the rest of the quarter would be taken up by drives that ended in punts, but the Steelers got a big scoring opportunity when Amos Zereoué's 36-yard run gave them a first down on the Cleveland 23-yard line. This would only amount to nothing though, as Maddox was intercepted by Daylon McCutcheon on the next play.

One play into the second quarter, Steelers receiver Antwaan Randle El fumbled a Browns punt, and Chris Akins recovered the ball for Cleveland on the Steelers 32-yard line. On the next play, Cleveland took a 14–0 lead with Holcomb's 32-yard touchdown pass to Dennis Northcutt. The Browns seemed to be taking control of the game now, particularly when another Steelers drive into field goal range was again snuffed out by a McCutheon interception (the Steelers' third turnover in less than six minutes). But suddenly Randle El brought the team right back into the game by returning a punt 66 yards for a touchdown, making the score 14–7. Cleveland stormed right back, as Holcomb's 29-yard pass to Johnson and two completions to running back Jamel White for 22 total yards earned the team a Phil Dawson field goal that made the score 17–7 going into halftime.

Early in the third quarter, Northcutt returned Tom Rouen's 37-yard punt 59 yards to the Pittsburgh 14-yard line, setting up Holcomb's 15-yard touchdown pass to Northcutt that increased the Browns lead to 24–7. Then after a punt, Cleveland drove to the Steelers 32-yard line. They were now in a position to build a near-insurmountable lead, but Mike Logan made a clutch interception to keep the team's victory hopes alive. Maddox then completed 7/8 passes for 62 yards, one of them a 24-yard completion to Randle El, and rushed for eight as he led the team 71 yards to score on his 6-yard touchdown pass to Plaxico Burress, cutting the deficit to 24–14 with four minutes left in the third quarter. Cleveland responded by driving 64 yards in eight plays, featuring a 43-yard completion from Holcomb to receiver André Davis, to score on Dawson's 24-yard field goal on the second play of the final quarter, increasing their lead to 27–14.

On Pittsburgh's ensuing drive, Maddox completed three passes to Randle-El for gains of 20, 30, and six yards before finding tight end Jerame Tuman with a 3-yard touchdown pass early in the fourth quarter. But the Browns stormed back, with Green's 23-yard run sparking a 61-yard drive that ended on Holcomb's 22-yard touchdown pass to Davis, giving them a 33–21 lead after the 2-point conversion failed.

With 3:06 left in the game, Maddox finished off a 77-yard drive with a 5-yard touchdown pass to Hines Ward, cutting the score to 33–28. The Browns tried to run out the clock on their ensuing possession, but Northcutt dropped a potential first down catch on third down and 12, forcing his team to punt. Taking over at their 42-yard line, Maddox threw to Burress for 24 yards, Ward for 10, Burress again for 17, and Ward again for seven before Fuamatu-Ma'afala finished the drive with a 3-yard touchdown run. Then Tuman scored the two-point conversion to give the Steelers a 36–33 lead. The Browns attempted to drive for the tying field goal, but time expired in the game on Holcomb's 16-yard completion to Andre King at the Steeler's 29-yard line.

Maddox completed 30 of 48 passes for a franchise postseason record 367 yards and three touchdowns, with two interceptions. Burress caught six passes for 100 yards and a touchdown, while Ward caught 11 passes for 104 yards and a score. Randle El caught five passes for 85 yards and returned a punt 66 yards for a touchdown. In his first career playoff game, Holcomb completed 26 of 43 passes for 429 yards, three touchdowns, and an interception. Johnson caught four passes for 140 yards, while Northcutt caught six passes for 92 yards and two touchdowns, and returned two punts for 70 yards.

With the loss, the Browns season ended with them failing to win their playoff game since 1994. This would end up being both, the Browns last playoff game against the Steelers, and Cleveland's last playoff game in general up until 2020. As the Browns would end up missing the playoffs ever year from 2003-2019, with 2007 being their only winning season after 2002 prior to 2020.

This was the second postseason meeting between the Browns and Steelers. Pittsburgh won the only prior meeting.[6]

This was the first game that Heinz Field played Renegade.
