= 2002–03 NFL playoffs =

American football tournament

- Dates: January 4–26, 2003
- Season: 2002
- Teams: 12
- Games played: 11
- Super Bowl XXXVII site: Qualcomm Stadium; San Diego, California
- Defending champions: New England Patriots (did not qualify)
- Champion: Tampa Bay Buccaneers (1st title)
- Runner-up: Oakland Raiders
- Conference runners-up: Philadelphia Eagles; Tennessee Titans
NFL playoffs
← 2001–02	2003–04 →

The National Football League playoffs for the 2002 season began on January 4, 2003. The postseason tournament concluded with the Tampa Bay Buccaneers defeating the Oakland Raiders in Super Bowl XXXVII, 48–21, on January 26, at Qualcomm Stadium in San Diego, California.

Prior to the 2002–03 season, the league realigned its teams into eight divisions (four in each conference). Thus, the 12-team playoff format was modified. The league abided by this updated system until 2020:

- The four division champions are seeded 1–4 based on their regular season won-lost-tied record.
- Two "wild card" qualifiers (those non-division champions with the conference's best won-lost-tied percentages) are seeded 5 and 6 within the conference.

As a result, a wild card team could no longer host a playoff game during the opening Wild Card round. Prior to the 2002–03 playoffs, a team could finish second in its division and host a playoff game as the number 4 seed (best wild-card team). The new rules meant that the number 4 seed was awarded to a division champion and not a wild card team (non-division champion). Under the new system, a wild card team could host a playoff game only if the number 5 and number 6 seeds in one conference advance to a Conference Championship Game, in which case a number 5 seed would host the game (which, under this format, never happened).

This would be the last season until 2022–23 in which the Divisional Round did not include Tom Brady, Aaron Rodgers, Peyton Manning or Ben Roethlisberger.

== Participants ==
Within each conference, the four division winners and the top two non-division winners with the best overall regular season records) qualified for the playoffs. The four division winners are seeded 1–4 based on their overall won-lost-tied record, and the wild card teams are seeded 5–6. The NFL does not use a fixed bracket playoff system, and there are no restrictions regarding teams from the same division matching up in any round. In the first round, dubbed the wild-card playoffs or wild-card weekend, the third-seeded division winner hosts the sixth-seed wild card, and the fourth seed hosts the fifth. The 1 and 2 seeds from each conference received a first-round bye. In the second round, the divisional playoffs, the number 1 seed hosts the worst-surviving seed from the first round (seed 4, 5, or 6), while the number 2 seed will play the other team (seed 3, 4, or 5). The two surviving teams from each conference's divisional playoff games met in the respective AFC and NFC Conference Championship games, hosted by the higher seed. Although the Super Bowl, the championship round of the playoffs, is played at a neutral site, the designated home team is based on an annual rotation by conference.

Playoff seeds
Seed	AFC	NFC
1	Oakland Raiders (West winner)	Philadelphia Eagles (East winner)
2	Tennessee Titans (South winner)	Tampa Bay Buccaneers (South winner)
3	Pittsburgh Steelers (North winner)	Green Bay Packers (North winner)
4	New York Jets (East winner)	San Francisco 49ers (West winner)
5	Indianapolis Colts (wild card)	New York Giants (wild card)
6	Cleveland Browns (wild card)	Atlanta Falcons (wild card)

== Bracket ==
Jan 5 – Heinz Field	Jan 11 – The Coliseum
6	Cleveland	33
3	Pittsburgh	31
3	Pittsburgh	36	Jan 19 – Network Associates Coliseum
2	Tennessee	34*
AFC
Jan 4 – Giants Stadium	2	Tennessee	24
Jan 12 – Network Associates Coliseum
1	Oakland	41
5	Indianapolis	0	AFC Championship
4	NY Jets	10
4	NY Jets	41	Jan 26 – Qualcomm Stadium
1	Oakland	30
Wild-card round
Divisional round
Jan 5 – Candlestick Park	A1	Oakland	21
Jan 12 – Raymond James Stadium
N2	Tampa Bay	48
5	NY Giants	38	Super Bowl XXXVII
4	San Francisco	6
4	San Francisco	39	Jan 19 – Veterans Stadium
2	Tampa Bay	31
NFC
Jan 4 – Lambeau Field	2	Tampa Bay	27
Jan 11 – Veterans Stadium
1	Philadelphia	10
6	Atlanta	27	NFC Championship
6	Atlanta	6
3	Green Bay	7
1	Philadelphia	20

* Indicates OT victory

== Schedule ==
During the 2001–02 NFL playoffs, the NFL experimented with playing Saturday prime time playoff games. The league was pleased with the results, and decided to revise its entire playoff schedule, beginning with the 2002 season. Wild Card and Divisional Saturday games continued to be played at 4:30 p.m. and 8 p.m. EST, as they had in the previous season. Sunday wild card and divisional playoff games were moved from 12:30 p.m. and 4:00 p.m. EST to 1:00 p.m. and 4:30 p.m., respectively.

The start times for the Conference Championship Games were also changed, from 12:30 p.m. and 4 p.m. EST to 3 p.m. and 6:30 p.m. respectively. ^{[1]} The conferences would then begin to annually alternate between the early and late games, with the first game during this 2002–03 season being the NFC title game and the second the AFC title game. Since then, the NFC title game is first in even-numbered seasons (2002, 2004, etc.) and the AFC title game first in odd-numbered seasons (2003, 2005, etc.). This continued an unofficial rotation that began with the Conference Championships in the 1996 NFL Playoffs.

This change would also avoid the future possibility of having to reschedule a 9:30 a.m. PST/10:30 a.m. MST Conference Championship Game if both contests took place in those time zones. Conference Championship Games in those time zones now start no earlier than 12 p.m. local time. When Denver and San Francisco hosted the AFC and NFC Championship Games in 1990, the league moved both contests back an hour, but it also forced the networks to reluctantly change or move their prime time lineups. Holding the games on separate days like in 1982–83 was rejected due to the short notice. And for the third time in recent few years, there was no bye week before Super Bowl.

In the United States, ABC broadcast the first two Wild Card playoff games and Super Bowl XXXVII. CBS telecast the rest of the AFC playoff games and Fox the rest of the NFC games.

Round	Away team	Score	Home team	Date	Kickoff (ET / UTC-5)	TV	Viewers (millions)	TV Rating
Wild-card round	Indianapolis Colts	0–41	New York Jets	January 4, 2003	4:30 p.m.	ABC	19.7	13.0
Wild-card round	Atlanta Falcons	27–7	Green Bay Packers	January 4, 2003	8:00 p.m.	ABC	26.3	16.0
Wild-card round	Cleveland Browns	33–36	Pittsburgh Steelers	January 5, 2003	1:00 p.m.	CBS	27.5	18.1
Wild-card round	New York Giants	38–39	San Francisco 49ers	January 5, 2003	4:30 p.m.	Fox	29.8	18.2
Divisional round	Pittsburgh Steelers	31–34 (OT)	Tennessee Titans	January 11, 2003	4:30 p.m.	CBS	28.5	18.1
Divisional round	Atlanta Falcons	6–20	Philadelphia Eagles	January 11, 2003	8:00 p.m.	Fox	24.9	14.8
Divisional round	San Francisco 49ers	6–31	Tampa Bay Buccaneers	January 12, 2003	1:00 p.m.	Fox	28.1	18.3
Divisional round	New York Jets	10–30	Oakland Raiders	January 12, 2003	4:30 p.m.	CBS	35.1	22.1
Conference championships	Tampa Bay Buccaneers	27–10	Philadelphia Eagles	January 19, 2003	3:00 p.m.	Fox	38.7	23.8
Conference championships	Tennessee Titans	24–41	Oakland Raiders	January 19, 2003	6:30 p.m.	CBS	41.5	24.6
Super Bowl XXXVII Qualcomm Stadium San Diego, California	Oakland Raiders	21–48	Tampa Bay Buccaneers	January 26, 2003	6:30 p.m.	ABC	88.6	40.7

== Wild-card round ==
=== Saturday, January 4, 2003 ===
==== AFC: New York Jets 41, Indianapolis Colts 0 ====
Indianapolis Colts vs. New York Jets – Game summary

Quarter	1	2	3	4	Total
Colts	0	0	0	0	0
Jets	7	17	10	7	41

at Giants Stadium, East Rutherford, New Jersey

- Game time: 4:30 p.m. EST
- Game weather: 35 °F (2 °C), cloudy
- Game attendance: 78,524
- Referee: Tony Corrente
- TV announcers (ABC): Brent Musburger (play-by-play), Gary Danielson (color commentator), and Jack Arute (sideline reporter)

Game information

First quarter

- NYJ – Richie Anderson 56-yard pass from Chad Pennington (John Hall kick), 10:50. Jets 7–0. Drive: 5 plays, 77 yards, 2:27.

Second quarter

- NYJ – John Hall 41-yard field goal, 14:08. Jets 10–0. Drive: 9 plays, 46 yards, 5:34.
- NYJ – LaMont Jordan 1-yard run (John Hall kick), 9:41. Jets 17–0. Drive: 7 plays, 39 yards, 4:18.
- NYJ – Santana Moss 4-yard pass from Chad Pennington (John Hall kick), 0:37. Jets 24–0. Drive: 6 plays, 42 yards, 1:02.

Third quarter

- NYJ – John Hall 39-yard field goal, 13:28. Jets 27–0. Drive: 4 plays, −1 yard, 1:32.
- NYJ – Chris Baker 3-yard pass from Chad Pennington (John Hall kick), 1:44. Jets 34–0. Drive: 11 plays, 74 yards, 6:30.

Fourth quarter

- NYJ – LaMont Jordan 1-yard run (John Hall kick), 4:59. Jets 41–0. Drive: 13 plays, 64 yards, 9:17.

Top passers

- IND – Peyton Manning – 14/31, 137 yards, 2 INT
- NYJ – Chad Pennington – 19/25, 222 yards, 3 TD

Top rushers

- IND – James Mungro – 4 rushes, 36 yards
- NYJ – LaMont Jordan – 20 rushes, 102 yards, 2 TD

Top receivers

- IND – Marvin Harrison – 4 receptions, 47 yards
- NYJ – Richie Anderson – 2 receptions, 66 yards, TD

In his playoff debut, Jets quarterback Chad Pennington completed 19 of 25 passes for 222 yards and three touchdowns as he led the Jets to a shutout victory over the Colts. Colts quarterback Peyton Manning completed only 14 of 31 passes for 137 yards and two interceptions. The Jets gained 396 yards and didn't commit any turnovers, while the Colts gained only 176 yards and turned the ball over three times.

On the Jets' fifth play of the game, fullback Richie Anderson caught a screen pass from Pennington and took off down the left sideline for a 56-yard touchdown, the longest play in Jets postseason history. The Colts responded by driving deep into Jets territory, with Manning completing three passes to Marvin Harrison for 38 yards, but the drive stalled and Mike Vanderjagt missed a 41-yard field goal attempt.

After the missed field goal, Pennington completed a 13-yard pass to Santana Moss and a 23-yard pass to Wayne Chrebet, setting up John Hall's 41-yard field goal. Then Ray Mickens recovered a fumble from Troy Walters that had been forced by Khary Campbell on the ensuing kickoff, giving the Jets the ball on the Colts' 39-yard line. Six plays later, LaMont Jordan scored on a 1-yard touchdown run that gave the Jets a 17–0 lead. Later in the quarter, the Jets got the ball with great field position by receiving Hunter Smith's 32-yard punt on the Colts' 42-yard line, and they ended up increasing their lead to 24–0 with Pennington's 4-yard touchdown pass to Moss, who made a leaping catch in the back of the end zone with 37 seconds left in the half.

Early in the third quarter, Hall kicked another field goal on the end of a drive that was set up by a 70-yard kickoff return from receiver Chad Morton. Later on, Pennington completed 5 out of 6 passes for 59 yards on a 74-yard drive, the last one a 3-yard touchdown toss to rookie tight end Chris Baker. Then on the Colts' ensuing drive, Damien Robinson intercepted a pass from Manning and returned it 24 yards to the Jets' 36-yard line. The Jets then drove 64 yards in 13 plays, 11 of them runs by Jordan for 59 yards, including a 1-yard touchdown run to make the final score of the game 41–0. Jets linebacker James Darling then put the finishing touches on the win by intercepting Manning's final pass of the game.

This turned out to be the Jets' final playoff home game at Giants Stadium as well as the final playoff win for both the Giants and the Jets at the stadium. Coincidentally, the Giants' last playoff win in Giants Stadium, the 2000 NFC Championship Game, had the same final score as this game. This was also the last playoff win until 2020 for an AFC East division champion that was not by the New England Patriots. Jordan finished the game with 20 carries for 102 yards, a reception for nine yards, and two touchdowns.

This was the second postseason meeting between the Colts and Jets. The Jets won the previous meeting when the Colts were in Baltimore.

Previous playoff games
NY Jets leads 1–0 in all-time playoff games

1968

New York Jets 16 vs. Baltimore Colts 7

Super Bowl III

==== NFC: Atlanta Falcons 27, Green Bay Packers 7 ====
Atlanta Falcons vs. Green Bay Packers – Game summary

Quarter	1	2	3	4	Total
Falcons	14	10	3	0	27
Packers	0	0	7	0	7

at Lambeau Field, Green Bay, Wisconsin

- Game time: 8:00 p.m. EST/7:00 p.m. CST
- Game weather: 31 °F (−1 °C), chance of flurries
- Game attendance: 65,358
- Referee: Bernie Kukar
- TV announcers (ABC): Al Michaels (play-by-play), John Madden (color commentator), and Melissa Stark (sideline reporter)

Game information

First quarter

- ATL – Shawn Jefferson 10-yard pass from Michael Vick (Jay Feely kick), 9:17. Falcons 7–0. Drive: 10 plays, 76 yards, 5:43.
- ATL – Artie Ulmer 1-yard return of blocked punt (Jay Feely kick), 6:38. Falcons 14–0.

Second quarter

- ATL – T. J. Duckett 6-yard run (Jay Feely kick), 12:06. Falcons 21–0. Drive: 4 plays, 21 yards, 2:30.
- ATL – Jay Feely 22-yard field goal, 0:00. Falcons 24–0. Drive: 16 plays, 90 yards, 6:34.

Third quarter

- GB – Donald Driver 14-yard pass from Brett Favre (Ryan Longwell kick), 10:26. Falcons 24–7. Drive: 10 plays, 73 yards, 4:34.
- ATL – Jay Feely 23-yard field goal, 3:43. Falcons 27–7. Drive: 12 plays, 73 yards, 6:43.

Fourth quarter

- No scoring plays.

Top passers

- ATL – Michael Vick – 13/25, 117 yards, TD
- GB – Brett Favre – 20/42, 247 yards, TD, 2 INT

Top rushers

- ATL – Michael Vick – 10 rushes, 64 yards
- GB – Ahman Green – 11 rushes, 34 yards

Top receivers

- ATL – Warrick Dunn – 4 receptions, 40 yards
- GB – Javon Walker – 5 receptions, 104 yards

The Packers suffered their first home playoff loss in franchise history as the Falcons forced five turnovers and limited the Packers to only one touchdown. 22-year-old quarterback Michael Vick passed for 117 yards and rushed for 64 yards. The Packers, playing without Pro Bowl safety Darren Sharper and their top receiver Terry Glenn due to injuries, fell down 24–0 in the first half and could not recover. Packers quarterback Brett Favre threw two interceptions and lost a fumble, while Ryan Longwell missed two field goals.

The Falcons stormed out to a 7–0 lead by driving 76 yards on the opening drive, including an 18-yard reception and 12-yard run by running back Warrick Dunn, scoring with Vick's 10-yard touchdown pass to Shawn Jefferson. Then over the next three plays, but at the end of the Packers' next drive, Falcons linebacker Mark Simoneau blocked Josh Bidwell's punt and Artie Ulmer recovered it in the end zone for a touchdown to increase their lead to 14–0. The Packers responded with a drive to the Falcons' 20-yard line. But after Brady Smith sacked Favre for a 9-yard loss, Longwell missed a 47-yard field goal attempt.

Early in the second quarter, cornerback Tyrone Williams, a blocker on the Packers' punt return team ran into returner Eric Metcalf. As a result, Metcalf muffed the kick and Falcons fullback George Layne recovered the ball on the Packers' 21-yard line. Packers head coach Mike Sherman did not challenge the call, a mistake considering replays showed the punted ball bouncing off a Falcons player's left shoulder. Sherman said he spoke with an official on the field, "but he [mistakenly] led me to believe it would not be reviewable." Four plays after the turnover, T. J. Duckett's 6-yard touchdown run increased the Falcons' lead to 21–0. The Packers responded by driving to a first and goal situation on the Falcons' 1-yard line, but over the next three plays, Favre threw two incomplete passes and Ahman Green was tackled by Smith and safety Johndale Carty for a 1-yard loss. On fourth down and 2, Green was dropped for a 4-yard loss by nose tackle Ellis Johnson. Then Vick led the Falcons 90 yards in 16 plays, one of them a 21-yard run by Dunn, to go up 24–0 on Jay Feely's 22-yard field goal on the last play of the half.

The Packers regrouped on the opening drive of the second half, moving the ball 73 yards in 10 plays, the longest a 25-yard completion from Favre to wide receiver Donald Driver. Favre finished the drive with a 14-yard touchdown pass to Driver, but Driver was knocked out of the game on the play, and the Falcons responded with a 73-yard scoring drive of their own. The key play of the drive was a 22-yard scramble by Vick, while Feely finished it off with a 23-yard field goal that gave the Falcons a 27–7 lead. There was still 3:46 left in the third quarter, but this would be the game's final score. The Packers responded with a drive to the Falcons' 26-yard line, only to have Longwell miss a 44-yard field goal attempt.

The fourth quarter played out like comedy, as Feely missed two field goal attempts while the Packers turned the ball over three times: once on downs, the second time when Patrick Kerney recovered a fumble from Favre, and the third when Favre threw his second interception of the game to Carpenter. This would be the Falcons' final road playoff victory until 2017.

This was the second postseason meeting between the Falcons and Packers. The Packers won the only prior meeting.

Previous playoff games
Green Bay leads 1–0 in all-time playoff games

1995

Atlanta Falcons 20 @ Green Bay Packers 37

1995 NFC Wild Card playoffs

=== Sunday, January 5, 2003 ===
==== AFC: Pittsburgh Steelers 36, Cleveland Browns 33 ====
Cleveland Browns vs. Pittsburgh Steelers – Game summary

Quarter	1	2	3	4	Total
Browns	7	10	7	9	33
Steelers	0	7	7	22	36

at Heinz Field, Pittsburgh, Pennsylvania

- Game time: 1:00 p.m. EST
- Game weather: 27 °F (−3 °C), light snow
- Game attendance: 62,595
- Referee: Bill Carollo
- TV announcers (CBS): Greg Gumbel (play-by-play), Phil Simms (color commentator), and Armen Keteyian (sideline reporter)

Game information

First quarter

- CLE – William Green 1-yard run (Phil Dawson kick), 13:44. Browns 7–0. Drive: 4 plays, 80 yards, 1:16.

Second quarter

- CLE – Dennis Northcutt 32-yard pass from Kelly Holcomb (Phil Dawson kick), 14:28. Browns 14–0. Drive: 1 play, 32 yards, 0:06.
- PIT – Antwaan Randle El 66-yard punt return (Jeff Reed kick), 9:35. Browns 14–7.
- CLE – Phil Dawson 31-yard field goal, 0:49. Browns 17–7. Drive: 10 plays, 45 yards, 4:24.

Third quarter

- CLE – Dennis Northcutt 15-yard pass from Kelly Holcomb (Phil Dawson kick), 12:11. Browns 24–7. Drive: 3 plays, 14 yards, 0:49.
- PIT – Plaxico Burress 6-yard pass from Tommy Maddox (Jeff Reed kick), 3:50. Browns 24–14. Drive: 10 plays, 71 yards, 3:45.

Fourth quarter

- CLE – Phil Dawson 24-yard field goal, 14:52. Browns 27–14. Drive: 8 plays, 64 yards, 3:58.
- PIT – Jerame Tuman 3-yard pass from Tommy Maddox (Jeff Reed kick), 12:28. Browns 27–21. Drive: 6 plays, 65 yards, 2:24.
- CLE – André Davis 22-yard pass from Kelly Holcomb (pass failed), 10:17. Browns 33–21. Drive: 5 plays, 61 yards, 2:11.
- PIT – Hines Ward 5-yard pass from Tommy Maddox (Jeff Reed kick), 3:06. Browns 33–28. Drive: 10 plays, 77 yards, 2:24.
- PIT – Chris Fuamatu-Ma'afala 3-yard run (Tommy Maddox–Jerame Tuman pass), 0:54. Steelers 36–33. Drive: 6 plays, 61 yards, 1:41.

Top passers

- CLE – Kelly Holcomb – 26/43, 429 yards, 3 TD, INT
- PIT – Tommy Maddox – 30/48, 367 yards, 3 TD, 2 INT

Top rushers

- CLE – William Green – 25 rushes, 30 yards, TD
- PIT – Amos Zereoué – 13 rushes, 73 yards

Top receivers

- CLE – Kevin Johnson – 4 receptions, 140 yards
- PIT – Hines Ward – 11 receptions, 104 yards, TD

An amazing performance from Browns quarterback Kelly Holcomb, was overshadowed by journeyman quarterback Tommy Maddox, who led the Steelers to 29 second half points to overcome a 17-point deficit. A 3-yard touchdown run by Chris Fuamatu-Maʻafala with 54 seconds left capped the game-winning 58-yard drive.

On the third play of the game, Holcomb completed an 83-yard pass to Kevin Johnson at the Steelers' 1-yard line, setting up William Green's 1-yard touchdown run and giving the Browns a 7–0 lead after just 1:16 had elapsed in the game. Most of the rest of the quarter would be taken up by drives that ended in punts, but the Steelers got a big scoring opportunity when Amos Zereoué's 36-yard run gave them a first down on the Browns' 23-yard line. This would only amount to nothing though, as Maddox was intercepted by Daylon McCutcheon on the next play.

One play into the second quarter, Steelers wide receiver Antwaan Randle El fumbled a Browns punt, and Chris Akins recovered the ball for the Browns on the Steelers' 32-yard line. On the next play, the Browns took a 14–0 lead with Holcomb's 32-yard touchdown pass to Dennis Northcutt. The Browns seemed to be taking control of the game now, particularly when another Steelers drive into field goal range was again snuffed out by a McCutheon interception (the Steelers' third turnover in less than six minutes). But suddenly Randle El brought the team right back into the game by returning a punt 66 yards for a touchdown, making the score 14–7. The Browns stormed right back, as Holcomb's 29-yard pass to Johnson and two completions to running back Jamel White for 22 total yards earned the team a Phil Dawson field goal that made the score 17–7 going into halftime.

Early in the third quarter, Northcutt returned Tom Rouen's 37-yard punt 59 yards to the Steelers' 14-yard line, setting up Holcomb's 15-yard touchdown pass to Northcutt that increased the Browns' lead to 24–7. Then after a punt, the Browns drove to the Steelers' 32-yard line. They were now in position to build a near-insurmountable lead, but Mike Logan made a clutch interception to keep the Steelers' victory hopes alive. Maddox then completed 7 out of 8 passes for 62 yards, one of them a 24-yard completion to Randle El, and rushed for eight as he led the team 71 yards to score on his 6-yard touchdown pass to Plaxico Burress, cutting the deficit to 24–14 with four minutes left in the third quarter. The Browns responded by driving 64 yards in eight plays, featuring a 43-yard completion from Holcomb to receiver André Davis, to score on Dawson's 24-yard field goal on the second play of the final quarter, increasing their lead to 27–14.

On the Steelers' ensuing drive, Maddox completed three passes to Randle El for gains of 20, 30, and six yards before finding tight end Jerame Tuman with a 3-yard touchdown pass early in the fourth quarter. But the Browns stormed back, with Green's 23-yard run sparking a 61-yard drive that ended on Holcomb's 22-yard touchdown pass to Davis, giving them a 33–21 lead after the 2-point conversion failed.

With 3:06 left in the game, Maddox finished off a 77-yard drive with a 5-yard touchdown pass to Hines Ward, cutting the score to 33–28. The Browns tried to run out the clock on their ensuing possession, but Northcutt dropped a potential first down catch on third down and 12, forcing his team to punt. Taking over at their own 42-yard line, Maddox threw to Burress for 24 yards, Ward for 10, Burress again for 17, and Ward again for seven before Fuamatu-Ma'afala finished the drive with a 3-yard touchdown run. Then Tuman scored the two-point conversion to give the Steelers a 36–33 lead. The Browns attempted to drive for the tying field goal, but time expired in the game on Holcomb's 16-yard completion to Andre King at the Steelers' 29-yard line.

Maddox completed 30 of 48 passes for a franchise postseason record 367 yards and three touchdowns, with two interceptions. Burress caught six passes for 100 yards and a touchdown, while Ward caught 11 passes for 104 yards and a score. Randle El caught five passes for 85 yards and returned a punt 66 yards for a touchdown. In his first career playoff game, Holcomb completed 26 of 43 passes for 429 yards (NFL all time post season record at the time), three touchdowns, and an interception. Johnson caught four passes for 140 yards, while Northcutt caught six passes for 92 yards and two touchdowns, and returned two punts for 70 yards.

This was the last playoff appearance for the Browns until the 2020 season.

This was the second postseason meeting between the Browns and Steelers. The Steelers won the only prior meeting.

This was the first game that Heinz Field played Renegade.

Previous playoff games
Pittsburgh leads 1–0 in all-time playoff games

1994

Cleveland Browns 9 @ Pittsburgh Steelers 29

1994 AFC Divisional playoffs

==== NFC: San Francisco 49ers 39, New York Giants 38 ====
New York Giants vs. San Francisco 49ers – Game summary

Quarter	1	2	3	4	Total
Giants	7	21	10	0	38
49ers	7	7	8	17	39

at Candlestick Park, San Francisco, California

- Game time: 4:30 p.m. EST/1:30 p.m. PST
- Game weather: 53 °F (12 °C), sunny
- Game attendance: 66,318
- Referee: Ron Winter
- TV announcers (Fox): Joe Buck (play-by-play), Troy Aikman, Cris Collinsworth (color commentators), and Pam Oliver (sideline reporter)

Game information

First quarter

- SF – Terrell Owens 76-yard pass from Jeff Garcia (Jeff Chandler kick), 9:59. 49ers 7–0. Drive: 1 plays, 76 yards, 0:11.
- NYG – Amani Toomer 12-yard pass from Kerry Collins (Matt Bryant kick), 0:18. Tied 7–7. Drive: 11 plays, 65 yards, 4:15.

Second quarter

- NYG – Jeremy Shockey 2-yard pass from Kerry Collins (Matt Bryant kick), 12:19. Giants 14–7. Drive: 5 plays, 61 yards, 2:24.
- SF – Kevan Barlow 1-yard run (Jeff Chandler kick), 6:05. Tied 14–14. Drive: 10 plays, 69 yards, 6:14.
- NYG – Amani Toomer 8-yard pass from Kerry Collins (Matt Bryant kick), 2:40. Giants 21–14. Drive: 1 play, 8 yards, 0:05.
- NYG – Amani Toomer 24-yard pass from Kerry Collins (Matt Bryant kick), 0:10. Giants 28–14. Drive: 5 plays, 56 yards, 1:43.

Third quarter

- NYG – Tiki Barber 6-yard run (Matt Bryant kick), 9:53. Giants 35–14. Drive: 6 plays, 54 yards, 2:16.
- NYG – Matt Bryant 21-yard field goal, 4:27. Giants 38–14. Drive: 9 plays, 63 yards, 4:20.
- SF – Terrell Owens 26-yard pass from Jeff Garcia (Terrell Owens pass from Jeff Garcia), 2:03. Giants 38–22. Drive: 7 plays, 70 yards, 2:24.

Fourth quarter

- SF – Jeff Garcia 14-yard run (Terrell Owens pass from Jeff Garcia), 14:55. Giants 38–30. Drive: 3 plays, 27 yards, 0:41.
- SF – Jeff Chandler 25-yard field goal, 7:49. Giants 38–33. Drive: 15 plays, 74 yards, 5:26.
- SF – Tai Streets 13-yard pass from Jeff Garcia (pass failed), 1:00. 49ers 39–38. Drive: 9 plays, 68 yards, 2:01.

Top passers

- NYG – Kerry Collins – 29/43, 342 yards, 4 TD, INT
- SF – Jeff Garcia – 27/44, 331 yards, 3 TD, INT

Top rushers

- NYG – Tiki Barber – 26 rushes, 115 yards, TD
- SF – Jeff Garcia – 7 rushes, 60 yards, TD

Top receivers

- NYG – Amani Toomer – 8 receptions, 136 yards, 3 TD
- SF – Terrell Owens – 9 receptions, 177 yards, 2 TD

The Steelers' comeback earlier in the day was matched by the 49ers' similar late drive, overcoming a 38–14 deficit by scoring 25 unanswered points in the second half.

In the first quarter, 49ers linebacker Julian Peterson intercepted a pass from Kerry Collins at the 49ers' 24-yard line after it bounced off the hands of running back Ron Dayne. On the next play, 49ers quarterback Jeff Garcia threw a moderate pass to Terrell Owens, who broke two tackles and took it 76 yards to the end zone. The Giants responded with an 11-play, 65-yard drive, that ended with Collins' 12-yard touchdown pass to Amani Toomer, tying the game at 7.

In the second quarter, the Giants stormed 61 yards in five plays, featuring a 29-yard run by Tiki Barber. After that, Collins completed a 27-yard pass to tight end Jeremy Shockey, and capped off the drive with a 2-yard touchdown pass to him one play later. The 49ers however, responded with an unconventional 69-yard drive that featured two runs by Garcia for over 10 yards and a 25-yard completion from Owens to receiver Tai Streets on a reverse-pass play. Running back Kevan Barlow completed the drive with a 1-yard touchdown run to tie the game. However, two key 49ers turnovers allowed the Giants to go into their locker room at halftime with a 28–14 lead. First, the Giants were forced to punt on their ensuing possession, but returner Cedrick Wilson muffed the kick and the Giants' Johnnie Harris recovered the ball on the 49ers' 8-yard line. Collins then threw an 8-yard touchdown pass to Toomer on the next play. After the ensuing kickoff, cornerback Jason Sehorn picked off a pass from Garcia at the Giants' 44-yard line. Two plays later on third down and 8, Collins completed a 30-yard pass to Barber, and followed it up with a 24-yard touchdown completion to Toomer with just 10 seconds left in the half.

The Giants continued to build their lead in the second half. Five minutes into the third quarter, the 49ers turned the ball over on downs at the Giants' 46-yard line, but the stop came at a cost for the Giants, as defensive end Kenny Holmes suffered a game-ending injury while making the tackle on fourth down. The Giants subsequently moved the ball 54 yards in six plays. Barber rushed for 37 yards on the drive and finished it with a 6-yard touchdown run, increasing the Giants' lead to 35–14. Later in the quarter, Collins' 46-yard completion to Toomer set up a 21-yard field goal from kicker Matt Bryant, making the score 38–14 with 4:27 left in the third quarter. However, the field goal came after Shockey dropped a potential touchdown catch in the end zone.

The 49ers stormed back, driving 70 yards in seven plays on a drive that consumed only 2:24 and ended with Garcia's 26-yard touchdown pass to Owens. Owens added a 2-point conversion catch on the next play, cutting the 49ers' deficit to 38–22. After the play, an iconic scene of defensive end Michael Strahan walking over to Owens and pointing to the scoreboard to remind him of the deficit they still faced would be a highlight of the game.

The Giants were forced to punt after three plays on their next drive. Matt Allen's short kick and a 15-yard personal foul against Dhani Jones for hitting the returner after a fair catch gave the 49ers the ball on the Giants' 27-yard line. Three plays later, Garcia scored on a 14-yard touchdown run, and then completed another two-point conversion pass to Owens, cutting the score to 38–30 five seconds into the fourth quarter.

After forcing the Giants to punt once again, the 49ers drove 74 yards in 15 plays, including a 3-yard reception by Streets on fourth down and 1, and scored with a 25-yard field goal by Jeff Chandler. The Giants responded with a drive to the 49ers' 20-yard line, but with 3:01 left in the game, a poor snap from 41-year-old Trey Junkin, who had been signed back out of retirement less than a week before the game, threw off the timing on Bryant's 42-yard field goal attempt and it went wide left. Garcia then took over, converting two third downs, one of them a 25-yard completion to tight end Eric Johnson, and rushing for 12 yards on the way to a 13-yard touchdown pass to Streets. This time, the two-point conversion failed when Will Allen intercepted Garcia's pass intended for Owens, but the 49ers took the lead, 39–38, with one minute left in regulation.

The touchdown and 2-point conversion plays resulted in offsetting personal fouls on both teams after they ended. After the touchdown, Owens was flagged for taunting safety Shaun Williams, while Williams was flagged shoving him to the ground in response. Then after the two-point conversion, Owens was penalized for a late hit on Allen, which started a brawl between both teams. During the altercation, Williams was penalized and ejected from the game for throwing a punch at 49ers center Jeremy Newberry.

However, the Giants did have a chance to win. Delvin Joyce returned Chandler's short kickoff 32 yards to the 48-yard line. Collins then led them to the 49ers' 23-yard line with six seconds left, but Junkin botched a snap for a 41-yard field goal attempt, resulting in a feeble pass play that fell incomplete. The Giants were also called for having an illegal man downfield on the play, and the game ended. The following day, it was revealed that the penalized player (guard Rich Seubert) had in fact checked in as an eligible receiver before the field goal attempt, although a different Giants lineman (guard Tam Hopkins) actually was illegally downfield. NFL Vice President of Officiating Mike Pereira admitted pass interference also should have been called on 49ers defensive end Chike Okeafor for pulling down Seubert. Had the two right calls been made, the down would have been replayed at the previous spot, the 49ers' 23-yard line.

Garcia threw for 331 yards, three touchdowns, and one interception, while also leading the 49ers on the ground with 60 rushing yards and another score. Owens caught nine passes for 177 yards and two touchdowns. He also scored two two-point conversions and completed a 25-yard pass. Collins threw for 342 yards, four touchdowns, and one interception. Toomer caught eight passes for 136 yards and three touchdowns. Barber rushed for 115 yards, caught five passes for 62 yards, and scored a touchdown.

This was featured on the NFL's Greatest Games as One Wild Finish, and was #4 on NFL Top 10's Top Ten Comebacks and was also #6 on NFL Top 10's Top Ten Controversial Calls for Rich Seubert's illegal man downfield call.

This was the seventh postseason meeting between the Giants and 49ers. Both teams had split the prior six meetings.

Previous playoff games
Tied 3–3 in all-time playoff games

1981

New York Giants 24 @ San Francisco 49ers 38

1981 NFC Divisional playoffs

1984

New York Giants 10 @ San Francisco 49ers 21

1984 NFC Divisional playoffs

1985

San Francisco 49ers 3 @ New York Giants 17

1985 NFC Wild Card playoffs

1986

San Francisco 49ers 3 @ New York Giants 49

1986 NFC Divisional playoffs

1990

New York Giants 15 @ San Francisco 49ers 13

1990 NFC Championship Game

1993

New York Giants 3 @ San Francisco 49ers 44

1993 NFC Divisional playoffs

== Divisional round ==
=== Saturday, January 11, 2003 ===
==== AFC: Tennessee Titans 34, Pittsburgh Steelers 31 (OT) ====
Pittsburgh Steelers vs. Tennessee Titans – Game summary

Quarter	1	2	3	4	OT	Total
Steelers	0	13	7	11	0	31
Titans	14	0	14	3	3	34

at The Coliseum, Nashville, Tennessee

- Game time: 4:30 p.m. EST/3:30 p.m. CST
- Game weather: 34 °F (1 °C), sunny
- Game attendance: 68,809
- Referee: Ron Blum
- TV announcers (CBS): Dick Enberg (play-by-play), Dan Dierdorf (color commentator), and Bonnie Bernstein (sideline reporter)

Game information

First quarter

- TEN – Steve McNair 8-yard run (Joe Nedney kick), 11:01. Titans 7–0. Drive: 7 plays, 52 yards, 3:19.
- TEN – Eddie George 1-yard run (Joe Nedney kick), 0:17. Titans 14–0. Drive: 16 plays, 76 yards, 9:03.

Second quarter

- PIT – Hines Ward 8-yard pass from Tommy Maddox (Jeff Reed kick), 9:29. Titans 14–7. Drive: 2 plays, 8 yards, 0:38.
- PIT – Jeff Reed 30-yard field goal, 6:47. Titans 14–10. Drive: 5 plays, 47 yards, 1:53.
- PIT – Jeff Reed 39-yard field goal, 0:00. Titans 14–13. Drive: 8 plays, 61 yards, 1:35.

Third quarter

- PIT – Amos Zereoué 31-yard run (Jeff Reed kick), 14:37. Steelers 20–14. Drive: 1 play, 31 yards, 0:08.
- TEN – Frank Wycheck 7-yard pass from Steve McNair (Joe Nedney kick), 9:37. Titans 21–20. Drive: 8 plays, 63 yards, 5:00.
- TEN – Kinney 2-yard pass from McNair (Joe Nedney kick), 4:38. Titans 28–20. Drive: 8 plays, 58 yards, 4:04.

Fourth quarter

- PIT – Ward 21-yard pass from Maddox (Plaxico Burress pass from Hines Ward), 10:09. Tied 28–28. Drive: 6 plays, 65 yards, 2:07.
- PIT – Jeff Reed 40-yard field goal, 8:30. Steelers 31–28. Drive: 5 plays, 35 yards, 1:24.
- TEN – Joe Nedney 42-yard field goal, 5:40. Tied 31–31. Drive: 7 plays, 34 yards, 2:50.

Overtime

- TEN – Joe Nedney 26-yard field goal, 12:45. Titans 34–31. Drive: 5 plays, 61 yards, 2:15.

Top passers

- PIT – Tommy Maddox – 21/41, 266 yards, 2 TD, INT
- TEN – Steve McNair – 27/44, 338 yards, 2 TD, 2 INT

Top rushers

- PIT – Amos Zereoué – 14 rushes, 49 yards, TD
- TEN – Eddie George – 15 rushes, 33 yards

Top receivers

- PIT – Hines Ward – 7 receptions, 82 yards, 2 TD
- TEN – Frank Wycheck – 10 receptions, 123 yards, TD

The third time was the charm for Titans kicker Joe Nedney. After missing the potential game-winning field goal at the end of regulation time, and a second failed kick in overtime was negated because of a controversial running-into-the-kicker penalty on the Steelers' Dewayne Washington, Nedney won the game from 26 yards out 2:15 into overtime. Steelers head coach Bill Cowher was incensed, saying he called a timeout before the winning kick took place.

Titans cornerback Samari Rolle gave his team an early scoring opportunity when he intercepted Tommy Maddox's first pass of the game and returned it 16 yards to the Titans' 48-yard line. The Titans then drove 52 yards in seven plays to score on quarterback Steve McNair's 8-yard scramble. Following a Steelers punt, the Titans drove 76 yards in 16 plays to score on Eddie George's 1-yard touchdown run. The key player of the drive was wide receiver Drew Bennett, who was responsible for two of the drive's four third down conversions. He caught a 19-yard pass on third and 16 from the Titans' 36-yard line, and later hauled in a 9-yard catch on third and 8 from the Steelers' 43-yard line.

However, the Steelers ended up dominating the second quarter. After punting on their next drive, Lethon Flowers recovered a fumble from George (his first fumble of the season) on the Titans' 8-yard line, leading to Maddox's 8-yard touchdown pass to Hines Ward. Then the Titans lost another turnover when McNair threw a pass that was intercepted by Chad Scott on the Steelers 41-yard line. On the next play, Maddox completed a 40-yard pass to Plaxico Burress, setting up Jeff Reed's 30-yard field goal that made the score 14–10. The next time they had the ball, they took advantage of a 35-yard pass interference penalty against Rolle, along with three key plays by Ward, who caught two passes for 18 yards and rushed for 11. Reed finished the drive with a 39-yard field goal on the last play of the half, making the score 14–13 going into halftime.

On the first play of the second half, Steelers nose tackle Casey Hampton forced a fumble from George that Aaron Smith recovered for the Steelers on the Titans' 31-yard line. On the next play, the team took a 20–14 lead with a 31-yard touchdown run by Amos Zereoué. But the Titans stormed right back, going into a no-huddle offense and scoring twice in a span of five minutes. First, they responded by driving 70 yards in eight plays, including a 39-yard reception by tight end Frank Wycheck, and scored on McNair's 7-yard touchdown toss to Wycheck that retook the lead. The Steelers had to punt on their next drive, and Derrick Mason returned the ball nine yards to the Titans' 42-yard line. McNair then completed two passes to Mason for 24 total yards and one to Wycheck for 21 on the way to his 2-yard touchdown pass to tight end Erron Kinney, giving the Titans a 28–20 lead with 2:53 left in the third quarter.

The momentum seemed to be back in the Titans' favor, particularly when Reed missed a 44-yard field goal attempt early in the fourth quarter. But after a Titans punt, the Steelers drove 65 yards in seven plays to score on Maddox's 21-yard touchdown pass to Ward. Then Burress caught a pass for a 2-point conversion that tied the game at 28. On the first play after the following kickoff, Deshea Townsend intercepted a pass from McNair on the Steelers' 43-yard line, leading to Reed's 40-yard field goal that gave the team a 31–28 lead. Titans running back John Simon returned the ensuing kickoff 38 yards to the Steelers' 42-yard line, where the team proceeded to drive 38 yards, including a 20-yard catch by Bennett, to tie the game with Nedney's 43-yard field goal. After the next three drives ended in punts, the Titans drove for a potential game-winning field goal, only to have Nedney miss a 48-yard kick on the last play of regulation.

In the first overtime period, referee Ron Blum announced that each team had three timeouts. This caused some confusion because, compared with the regular season, overtime in the postseason utilizes slightly different rules. The Titans took the opening kickoff and McNair threw completions to Justin McCareins for gains of 31 and 22 yards before Robert Holcombe's 3-yard run put the ball on the Steelers' 16-yard line. They sent out Nedney to win the game, setting up a wild finish. Nedney's first kick was good, but it was negated because the Steelers had called timeout. The fireworks operator at the stadium inadvertently set off the fireworks, delaying the game for several minutes. After the fireworks had fizzled, Nedney attempted to win the game again. His kick was wide right, but Washington was penalized for running into Nedney. After the five-yard penalty was assessed, Nedney was given a third try. This time he converted the kick, winning the game.

Wycheck finished the game with 10 receptions for 123 yards and a touchdown. McNair threw for a career postseason high 338 yards and two touchdowns, with two interceptions, while rushing for 29 yards and another score on the ground. Maddox threw for 266 yards, two touchdowns, and an interception. Ward caught seven passes for 82 yards and two touchdowns, while also rushing for 11 yards.

This was the fourth postseason meeting between the Steelers and Titans. The Steelers won all three prior meetings while the Titans were the Houston Oilers.

Previous playoff games
Pittsburgh leads 3–0 in all-time playoff games

1978

Houston Oilers 5 @ Pittsburgh Steelers 34

1978 AFC Championship Game

1979

Houston Oilers 13 @ Pittsburgh Steelers 27

1979 AFC Championship Game

1989

Pittsburgh Steelers 26 @ Houston Oilers 23 (OT)

1989 AFC Wild Card playoffs

==== NFC: Philadelphia Eagles 20, Atlanta Falcons 6 ====
Atlanta Falcons vs. Philadelphia Eagles – Game summary

Quarter	1	2	3	4	Total
Falcons	0	6	0	0	6
Eagles	10	3	0	7	20

at Veterans Stadium, Philadelphia, Pennsylvania

- Game time: 8:00 p.m. EST
- Game weather: 29 °F (−2 °C), clear
- Game attendance: 66,452
- Referee: Mike Carey
- TV announcers (Fox): Dick Stockton (play-by-play), Daryl Johnston (color commentator), and Ron Pitts (sideline reporter)

Game information

First quarter

- PHI – Bobby Taylor 39-yard interception return (David Akers kick), 7:58. Eagles 7–0
- PHI – David Akers 34-yard field goal, 3:47. Eagles 10–0. Drive: 6 plays, 47 yards, 2:27.

Second quarter

- PHI – David Akers 39-yard field goal, 10:05. Eagles 13–0. Drive: 9 plays, 65 yards, 5:05.

Third quarter

- ATL – Jay Feely 34-yard field goal, 4:10. Eagles 13–3. Drive: 13 plays, 61 yards, 5:55.
- ATL – Jay Feely 52-yard field goal, 0:00. Eagles 13–6. Drive: 10 plays, 45 yards, 1:49.

Fourth quarter

- PHI – James Thrash 35-yard pass from Donovan McNabb (David Akers kick), 6:26. Eagles 20–6. Drive: 10 plays, 75 yards, 5:42.

Top passers

- ATL – Michael Vick – 22/38, 274 yards, 2 INT
- PHI – Donovan McNabb – 20/30, 247 yards, TD

Top rushers

- ATL – Warrick Dunn – 14 rushes, 45 yards
- PHI – Duce Staley – 18 rushes, 63 yards

Top receivers

- ATL – Brian Finneran – 5 receptions, 72 yards
- PHI – James Thrash – 2 receptions, 77 yards, TD

The hyped quarterback duel between Donovan McNabb and Michael Vick never materialized, as the Eagles' defense sacked Vick three times and intercepted him twice, including Bobby Taylor's 39-yard return for a touchdown.

At the end of the game's second possession, Eagles punter Lee Johnson pinned the Falcons back at their own 18-yard line with a 60-yard kick. A few plays later, Taylor intercepted a Vick pass and returned it 39 yards for the first score of the game. Following a Falcons punt, McNabb's completions to Chad Lewis and Todd Pinkston for gains of 15 and 24 yards set up David Akers's 34-yard field goal. Early in the second quarter, Akers kicked another field goal at the end of a drive that featured a 42-yard completion from McNabb to receiver James Thrash.

With the Eagles now leading 13–0, Vick tried to rally his team back. First he led them 61 yards in 13 plays, including a 23-yard completion to Quentin McCord, to score on a Jay Feely field goal with 4:10 left in the half. Then after forcing a punt, Vick ran for 20 yards and completed a 16-yard pass to Brian Finneran to set up a 52-yard field goal from Feely, making the score 13–6 by halftime. But in the third quarter, a 20-yard touchdown run by Vick that could have tied the game was called back by a holding penalty on Travis Claridge, and Feely missed a 37-yard field goal a few plays later. The Eagles eventually increased their lead to 20–6 with McNabb's 35-yard touchdown pass to Thrash with 6:26 left in the fourth quarter. The Falcons drove into scoring range on their next two possessions, but the first ended with a turnover on downs at the Eagles 21, and the second was ended by Brian Dawkins' interception with 17 seconds left in the game.

McNabb finished with 20 of 30 completions for 247 yards and a touchdown, along with 24 rushing yards. This would be the last win for the Eagles at Veterans Stadium.

This was the second postseason meeting between the Falcons and Eagles. The Falcons won the only prior meeting.

Previous playoff games
Atlanta leads 1–0 in all-time playoff games

1978

Philadelphia Eagles 13 @ Atlanta Falcons 14

1978 NFC Wild Card playoffs

=== Sunday, January 12, 2003 ===
==== NFC: Tampa Bay Buccaneers 31, San Francisco 49ers 6 ====
San Francisco 49ers vs. Tampa Bay Buccaneers – Game summary

Quarter	1	2	3	4	Total
49ers	3	3	0	0	6
Buccaneers	7	21	3	0	31

at Raymond James Stadium, Tampa, Florida

- Game time: 1:00 p.m. EST
- Game weather: 54 °F (12 °C), partly cloudy
- Game attendance: 65,599
- Referee: Gerald Austin
- TV announcers (Fox): Joe Buck (play-by-play), Troy Aikman, Cris Collinsworth (color commentators), and Pam Oliver (sideline reporter)

Game information

First quarter

- TB – Mike Alstott 2-yard run (Martín Gramática kick), 6:34. Buccaneers 7–0. Drive: 12 plays, 74 yards, 5:16.
- SF – Jeff Chandler 24-yard field goal, 0:17. Buccaneers 7–3. Drive: 12 plays, 63 yards, 6:17.

Second quarter

- TB – Joe Jurevicius 20-yard pass from Brad Johnson (Martín Gramática kick), 9:27. Buccaneers 14–3. Drive: 11 plays, 77 yards, 5:50.
- SF – Jeff Chandler 40-yard field goal, 8:31. Buccaneers 14–6. Drive: 5 plays, 24 yards, 0:56.
- TB – Rickey Dudley 12-yard pass from Brad Johnson (Martín Gramática kick), 7:24. Buccaneers 21–6. Drive: 2 plays, 52 yards, 1:07.
- TB – Mike Alstott 2-yard run (Martín Gramática kick), 0:50. Buccaneers 28–6. Drive: 4 plays, 26 yards, 1:10.

Third quarter

- TB – Martín Gramática 19-yard field goal, 8:28. Buccaneers 31–6. Drive: 10 plays, 36 yards, 6:16.

Fourth quarter

- No scoring plays.

Top passers

- SF – Jeff Garcia – 22/41, 193 yards, 3 INT
- TB – Brad Johnson – 15/31, 196 yards, 2 TD, INT

Top rushers

- SF – Garrison Hearst – 10 rushes, 55 yards
- TB – Mike Alstott – 17 rushes, 60 yards, 2 TD

Top receivers

- SF – Tai Streets – 5 receptions, 62 yards
- TB – Keyshawn Johnson – 5 receptions, 85 yards

The Buccaneers, with the league's top-ranked defense during the 2002 regular season, forced five turnovers, sacked quarterback Jeff Garcia four times with a 35.9 passer rating, and limited the 49ers to only two field goals. Buccaneers quarterback Brad Johnson, who had been sidelined for a month, returned to throw for 196 yards and two touchdowns. Fullback Mike Alstott rushed for 60 yards, caught three passes for 27 yards, and scored two touchdowns, while the Buccaneers held onto the ball for 36:46 and held the 49ers to a season low 228 yards. This was the 49ers' first playoff game without a touchdown since 1986, while the Buccaneers finished this game with more points scored than in their last three playoff games combined.

The 49ers had a chance to score early when Rashad Holman intercepted a pass from Johnson on the opening drive and returned it 13 yards to the Buccaneers' 40-yard line. But on third down, Buccaneers defenders Warren Sapp and Derrick Brooks shared a sack on Garcia that pushed the 49ers out of field goal range. The Buccaneers then drove 74 yards in 13 plays with a drive that included 17-yard receptions by Alstott and receiver Keyshawn Johnson, along with four third down conversions. Alstott finished the drive with a 2-yard touchdown run. The 49ers responded as Garcia's 30-yard completion to Tai Streets set up a 24-yard field goal by Jeff Chandler, but the 7–3 score ended up being as close as the 49ers would get for the rest of the game.

The Buccaneers increased their lead to 14–3 early in the second quarter with a 73-yard drive in which Keyshawn Johnson caught two passes for 42 total yards and Brad Johnson finished off with a 20-yard scoring pass to Joe Jurevicius. A pair of 15-yard penalties against the Bucs defense enabled the 49ers to drive back for another Chandler field goal, but a 36-yard pass interference call against 49ers safety Tony Parrish soon led to another Buccaneers touchdown, this one a 12-yard catch by tight end Rickey Dudley. Later on, Brooks intercepted a pass from Garcia at the 49ers' 26-yard line. One play later, Michael Pittman's 22-yard burst moved the ball to the 4-yard line, and Alstott finished the drive with a 2-yard touchdown run, giving the Buccaneers a 28–6 lead with 55 seconds left in the half.

On the first play of the third quarter, Buccaneers safety Dwight Smith intercepted Garcia and returned the ball six yards to the 49ers' 37-yard line, setting up Martín Gramática's 19-yard field goal. This ended up being the final score of the game as both defenses took over from that point on. The closest the Buccaneers would come to scoring again was a missed 45-yard field goal attempt by Gramatica. Meanwhile, the 49ers' remaining drives would result in two punts, a Garcia fumble that was recovered by Brooks on the Buccaneers' 35-yard line, a failed fourth down conversion attempt when Brooks tackled Eric Johnson one yard short of the marker, an interception by Buccaneers cornerback Ronde Barber (which was returned for a touchdown, but a penalty nullified the runback), and time expiring in the game.

Despite the 49ers' 10–6 record, the NFC West title, and their Wild Card playoff win against the New York Giants, 49ers head coach Steve Mariucci was fired three days after this game. The 49ers would not return to the playoffs until 2011.

This was the first postseason meeting between the 49ers and Buccaneers.

==== AFC: Oakland Raiders 30, New York Jets 10 ====
New York Jets vs. Oakland Raiders – Game summary

Quarter	1	2	3	4	Total
Jets	3	7	0	0	10
Raiders	3	7	7	13	30

at Network Associates Coliseum, Oakland, California

- Game time: 4:30 p.m. EST/1:30 p.m. PST
- Game weather: 61 °F (16 °C), mostly cloudy
- Game attendance: 62,207
- Referee: Dick Hantak
- TV announcers (CBS): Greg Gumbel (play-by-play), Phil Simms (color commentator), and Armen Keteyian (sideline reporter)

Game information

First quarter

- NYJ – John Hall 38-yard field goal, 11:07. Jets 3–0. Drive: 8 plays, 45 yards, 4:02.
- OAK – Sebastian Janikowski 29-yard field goal, 6:12. Tied 3–3. Drive: 9 plays, 53 yards, 5:10.

Second quarter

- OAK – Zack Crockett 1-yard run (Sebastian Janikowski kick), 13:49. Raiders 10–3. Drive: 6 plays, 27 yards, 2:41.
- NYJ – Jerald Sowell 1-yard pass from Chad Pennington (John Hall kick), 0:37. Tied 10–10. Drive: 16 plays, 81 yards, 7:46.

Third quarter

- OAK – Jerry Porter 29-yard pass from Rich Gannon (Sebastian Janikowski kick), 4:30. Raiders 17–10. Drive: 2 plays, 45 yards, 0:30.

Fourth quarter

- OAK – Jerry Rice 9-yard pass from Rich Gannon (Sebastian Janikowski kick), 14:50. Raiders 24–10. Drive: 4 plays, 65 yards, 2:03.
- OAK – Sebastian Janikowski 34-yard field goal, 8:07. Raiders 27–10. Drive: 7 plays, 46 yards, 3:27.
- OAK – Sebastian Janikowski 31-yard field goal, 3:00. Raiders 30–10. Drive: 8 plays, 37 yards, 4:28.

Top passers

- NYJ – Chad Pennington – 21/47, 183 yards, TD, 2 INT
- OAK – Rich Gannon – 20/30, 283 yards, 2 TD, INT

Top rushers

- NYJ – Curtis Martin – 16 rushes, 74 yards
- OAK – Charlie Garner – 21 rushes, 93 yards

Top receivers

- NYJ – Santana Moss – 4 receptions, 45 yards
- OAK – Jerry Porter – 6 receptions, 123 yards, TD

Chad Pennington's dream season came to an end as the Jets quarterback threw two interceptions, lost two fumbles, and was sacked four times (twice by Rod Coleman). Raiders quarterback Rich Gannon threw for 283 yards and two touchdowns as the Raiders pulled away from a 10–10 halftime tie by forcing four consecutive turnovers and scoring twenty consecutive second half points.

Aided by a 15-yard run from Curtis Martin and a 20-yard pass interference penalty on Charles Woodson, John Hall's 38-yard field goal gave the Jets an early 3–0 lead before he was matched by a 29-yard field goal from Sebastian Janikowski to tie the game. On the Jets' next drive, Travian Smith forced and recovered a fumble from Pennington on the Jets' 27-yard line. On the next play, running back Charlie Garner fumbled the ball, but Raiders guard Frank Middleton recovered it, and fullback Zack Crockett ended up scoring with a 1-yard touchdown run a few plays later. But Pennington led the Jets back, completing eight of nine passes for 51 yards on an 81-yard drive that took seven minutes off the clock and ended with his 1-yard touchdown pass to Jerald Sowell, tying the game with 22 seconds left in the first half.

Early in the third quarter, Tory James intercepted a pass from Pennington on the Jets' 45-yard line. Gannon then went downfield, hitting Tim Brown with a 16-yard completion and then throwing a 29-yard touchdown pass to Jerry Rice. The Jets turned the ball over on downs with their next possession, and Gannon once again went to work, completing a 50-yard strike to Jerry Porter and finishing the drive with a 9-yard touchdown pass to Rice, increasing the Raiders lead to 24–10. The Jets turned the ball over again when Richie Anderson fumbled a handoff on their ensuing drive. Damien Robinson intercepted a pass from Gannon on the next play, but the Raiders' Eric Barton returned the favor with an interception of his own, setting up a 34-yard Janikowski field goal. Janikowski later added another field goal with less than five minutes left in the game.

This was the fourth postseason meeting between the Jets and Raiders. The Jets won two of the three previous meetings.

Previous playoff games
NY Jets leads 2–1 in all-time playoff games

1968

Oakland Raiders 23 @ New York Jets 27

1968 AFL Championship Game

1982

New York Jets 17 @ Los Angeles Raiders 14

1982 AFC second round playoffs

2001

New York Jets 24 @ Oakland Raiders 38

2001 AFC Wild Card playoffs

== Conference championships ==
=== Sunday, January 19, 2003 ===
==== NFC: Tampa Bay Buccaneers 27, Philadelphia Eagles 10 ====
Tampa Bay Buccaneers vs. Philadelphia Eagles – Game summary

Quarter	1	2	3	4	Total
Buccaneers	10	7	3	7	27
Eagles	7	3	0	0	10

at Veterans Stadium, Philadelphia, Pennsylvania

- Game time: 3:00 p.m. EST
- Game weather: 26 °F (−3 °C), mostly cloudy
- Game attendance: 66,713
- Referee: Terry McAulay
- TV announcers (Fox): Joe Buck (play-by-play), Troy Aikman, Cris Collinsworth (color commentators), and Pam Oliver (sideline reporter)

Game information

First quarter

- PHI – Duce Staley 20-yard run (David Akers kick), 14:08. Eagles 7–0. Drive: 2 plays, 26 yards, 0:52.
- TB – Martín Gramática 48-yard field goal, 9:58. Eagles 7–3. Drive: 9 plays, 37 yards, 4:10.
- TB – Mike Alstott 1-yard run (Martín Gramática kick), 0:40. Buccaneers 10–7. Drive: 7 plays, 96 yards, 3:15.

Second quarter

- PHI – David Akers 30-yard field goal, 8:04. Tied 10–10. Drive: 8 plays, 26 yards, 3:53.
- TB – Keyshawn Johnson 9-yard pass from Brad Johnson (Martín Gramática kick), 2:28. Buccaneers 17–10. Drive: 12 plays, 80 yards, 5:36.

Third quarter

- TB – Martín Gramática 27-yard field goal, 1:02. Buccaneers 20–10. Drive: 8 plays, 43 yards, 3:55.

Fourth quarter

- TB – Ronde Barber 92-yard interception return (Martín Gramática kick), 3:12. Buccaneers 27–10.

Top passers

- TB – Brad Johnson – 20/33, 259 yards, TD, INT
- PHI – Donovan McNabb – 26/49, 243 yards, INT

Top rushers

- TB – Mike Alstott – 17 rushes, 25 yards, TD
- PHI – Duce Staley – 13 rushes, 58 yards, TD

Top receivers

- TB – Michael Pittman – 5 receptions, 53 yards
- PHI – Chad Lewis – 6 receptions, 65 yards

A game that is now known as Black Sunday in Philadelphia's sports lore, the Buccaneers won on the road for the first time in playoff history, and in temperatures below 32 °F (0 °C), in the last football game played at Veterans Stadium. The Eagles were four-point favorites at home going into the game. The Eagles had beaten the Buccaneers four consecutive times, in the wild card round the two previous seasons, and also during regular-season games in 2001 and 2002. During the two playoff losses, both at Veterans Stadium, the Buccaneers had failed to score a single touchdown.

Eagles running back Brian Mitchell returned the opening kickoff 70 yards to the Buccaneers' 26-yard line, setting up a 20-yard touchdown run by Duce Staley and a 7–0 lead less than a minute into the game. The Buccaneers responded by driving 37 yards and scoring with Martin Gramatica's 48-yard field goal on their ensuing drive. After an Eagles punt, Eagles safety Bobby Taylor intercepted a pass from Brad Johnson on the Buccaneers' 47-yard line. The Eagles then drove to a fourth down on the 32-yard line, but decided to punt rather than try a long field goal. Lee Johnson's 28-yard punt pinned the Buccaneers back at their own 4-yard line. But the Buccaneers stormed 96 yards and scored with Mike Alstott's 1-yard touchdown run to take a 10–7 lead. The key play on the drive was a 71-yard catch-and-run reception from Brad Johnson to Joe Jurevicius on 3rd and 2 from their own 24-yard line. According to America's Game, Buccaneers head coach Jon Gruden put three receivers – Jurevicius, Keyshawn Johnson, and Keenan McCardell – stacked tight in a trips formation, and managed to get Jurevicius in a one-on-one "option" crossing route against middle linebacker Barry Gardner of the Eagles. Jurevicious exploited the mismatch and turned upfield, tightroping down the sidelines until he was pushed out-of-bounds at the Eagles' 5-yard line. Jurevicious had missed practice all week because he was at the hospital with his wife. She had suffered complications with the birth of their son days earlier. Their newborn was delivered premature and critically ill, and was not expected to survive. Jurevicious was initially not expected to play, but decided at last minute to make the trip.

Early in the second quarter, Lee Johnson's 64-yard punt pinned the Buccaneers back on their own 2-yard line. This time the Eagles' defense was able to take advantage of the field position, forcing a three-and-out that earned the offense a first down on the Buccaneers' 38-yard line after Tom Tupa's 36-yard punt. The Eagles then drove 26 yards to tie the game 10–10 on a 30-yard field goal from David Akers, but the Buccaneers responded with an 80-yard, 12-play drive. Johnson completed a 31-yard pass to running back Michael Pittman and a 22-yard strike to Keyshawn Johnson before finishing the drive with a 9-yard touchdown pass to Keyshawn Johnson that gave the team a 17–10 lead. With time running out in the half, Donovan McNabb led the Eagles to the Buccaneers' 24-yard line, only to lose a fumble while being sacked by his high school teammate Simeon Rice, who stripped the ball away and recovered it himself.

On the Eagles' first drive of the third quarter, McNabb lost another fumble due to a tackle from cornerback Ronde Barber, and Buccaneers defensive tackle Ellis Wyms recovered it. Later on, the Buccaneers took advantage of a 15-yard fair catch interference penalty against the Eagles that gave them a first down on their own 48-yard line. They drove 41 yards, including a 19-yard catch by tight end Ken Dilger to set up a 27-yard Martín Gramática field goal. With 1:02 left in the third quarter, the Buccaneers had stretched out to a 20–10 lead.

Late in the fourth quarter, McNabb drove the Eagles 73 yards to the Buccaneers' 10-yard line. With 4:00 left in regulation, on 2nd and 7 at the 24-yard line, McNabb shook off sack attempts by Warren Sapp and Greg Spires, then scrambled to find Antonio Freeman for a 14-yard catch to the 10-yard line. One play later, on 1st and goal with 3:27 left, McNabb's pass intended for Freeman was intercepted by Ronde Barber, who ran it back 92 yards for a touchdown. Barber faked a blitz, then dropped back into coverage and stepped in front of Freeman, who fell down on the play. Barber's touchdown sealed the victory, and is often regarded as the biggest play in Buccaneers franchise history.

This game was somewhat devoid of offensive stars. Jurevicius's single reception for 71 yards made him the leading receiver, while the leading rusher was Staley with a mere 58 yards. Brad Johnson threw for 259 yards and one touchdown. Mitchell, the NFL's all-time leader in both regular season and postseason kickoff return yards, returned four kickoffs for 125 yards and four punts for 34 yards in the final playoff game of his career. The Bucs pass defense continued to show its dominance, as McNabb threw for 243 yards, but no touchdowns, one interception, and a 58.5 passer rating.

This was the last Eagles game played at Veterans Stadium, which was demolished following the 2003 Major League Baseball season. In a Sports Illustrated list of the worst losses in Philadelphia sports history since the city's last title in 1983 published in 2008, this game was ranked first.

Until the Jacksonville Jaguars' appearance in the 2017 AFC championship game, this was the last conference title game to feature a team from Florida. This was also the Buccaneers' last NFC championship appearance until 2020.

This was the first NFC Championship game ever to not feature either the Dallas Cowboys, Washington Redskins, San Francisco 49ers, St. Louis Rams, Green Bay Packers, or Minnesota Vikings.

This was the fourth postseason meeting between the Buccaneers and Eagles. The Eagles had won two of the previous three meetings.

Previous playoff games
Philadelphia leads 2–1 in all-time playoff games

1979

Philadelphia Eagles 17 @ Tampa Bay Buccaneers 24

1979 NFC Divisional playoffs

2000

Tampa Bay Buccaneers 3 @ Philadelphia Eagles 21

2000 NFC Wild Card playoffs

2001

Tampa Bay Buccaneers 9 @ Philadelphia Eagles 31

2001 NFC Wild Card playoffs

==== AFC: Oakland Raiders 41, Tennessee Titans 24 ====
Tennessee Titans vs. Oakland Raiders – Game summary

Quarter	1	2	3	4	Total
Titans	7	10	7	0	24
Raiders	14	10	3	14	41

at Network Associates Coliseum, Oakland, California

- Game time: 6:30 p.m. EST/3:30 p.m. PST
- Game weather: 52 °F (11 °C), clear
- Game attendance: 62,544
- Referee: Ed Hochuli
- TV announcers (CBS): Greg Gumbel (play-by-play), Phil Simms (color commentator), Armen Keteyian, and Bonnie Bernstein (sideline reporters)

Game information

First quarter

- OAK – Jerry Porter 3-yard pass from Rich Gannon (Sebastian Janikowski kick), 10:59. Raiders 7–0. Drive: 7 plays, 69 yards, 4:01.
- TEN – Drew Bennett 33-yard pass from Steve McNair (Joe Nedney kick), 5:59. Tied 7–7. Drive: 9 plays, 74 yards, 5:00.
- OAK – Charlie Garner 12-yard pass from Rich Gannon (Sebastian Janikowski kick), 2:47. Raiders 14–7. Drive: 7 plays, 85 yards, 3:12.

Second quarter

- TEN – Joe Nedney 29-yard field goal, 12:39. Raiders 14–10. Drive: 10 plays, 62 yards, 5:08.
- TEN – Steve McNair 9-yard run (Joe Nedney kick), 2:47. Titans 17–14. Drive: 11 plays, 55 yards, 6:07.
- OAK – Doug Jolley 1-yard pass from Rich Gannon (Sebastian Janikowski kick), 1:00. Raiders 21–17. Drive: 2 plays, 16 yards, 0:28.
- OAK – Sebastian Janikowski 43-yard field goal, 0:00. Raiders 24–17. Drive: 5 plays, 14 yards, 0:49.

Third quarter

- OAK – Sebastian Janikowski 32-yard field goal, 4:29. Raiders 27–17. Drive: 4 plays, 5 yards, 1:00.
- TEN – Steve McNair 13-yard run (Hentrich kick), 0:31. Raiders 27–24. Drive: 8 plays, 67 yards, 3:58.

Fourth quarter

- OAK – Rich Gannon 2-yard run (Sebastian Janikowski kick), 11:27. Raiders 34–24. Drive: 9 plays, 66 yards, 4:04.
- OAK – Zack Crockett 7-yard run (Sebastian Janikowski kick), 3:25. Raiders 41–24. Drive: 10 plays, 69 yards, 6:29.

Top passers

- TEN – Steve McNair – 21/36, 194 yards, TD
- OAK – Rich Gannon – 29/41, 286 yards, 3 TD

Top rushers

- TEN – Eddie George – 15 rushes, 67 yards
- OAK – Rich Gannon – 8 rushes, 41 yards

Top receivers

- TEN – Drew Bennett – 3 receptions, 58 yards, TD
- OAK – Jerry Rice – 5 receptions, 79 yards

The Raiders called only one running play in the first three quarters of the game, choosing to rely almost exclusively on the passing of 37-year-old quarterback Rich Gannon. And Gannon proved to be up to the task, leading the Raiders to victory with 286 passing yards and three touchdowns, along with 41 yards and a touchdown on eight carries.

On the first play from scrimmage, Gannon completed a 29-yard pass to Jerry Rice. He went on to complete 5 out of 5 passes for 64 yards and rush for three on a 70-yard drive that ended with his 2-yard touchdown pass to wide receiver Jerry Porter. The Titans countered with a 9-play, 74-yard drive that ended with a 33-yard touchdown pass from Steve McNair to Drew Bennett to tie it up five minutes later. Oakland struck back as Gannon completed a 17-yard pass to Charlie Garner, a 14-yard pass to Jon Ritchie, and then ran the ball 13 yards to the Titans 42. Following a penalty, his 31-yard completion to Porter moved the ball to the 16, and he ended up finishing the drive with a 12-yard touchdown completion to Garner, giving the Raiders a 14–7 lead.

The Titans then drove 59 yards, featuring a 16-yard scramble by McNair, to cut the score to 14–10 early in the second quarter on Joe Nedney's 29-yard field goal. Later on, Derrick Mason returned a Raiders punt 11 yards to the Titans' 45-yard line, sparking a 55-yard drive that ended on McNair's 9-yard touchdown run that gave the Raiders a 17–14 lead with 2:54 left in the half.

Then things fell apart for the Titans. Backed up at their own 11-yard line by a Shane Lechler punt and simply trying to run out the clock, fullback Robert Holcombe fumbled the ball while being tackled by Raiders linebacker Eric Barton, and safety Anthony Dorsett, Holcombe's old teammate who was a member of the Titans when they reached Super Bowl XXXIV, recovered the ball at the Titans' 16-yard line. On the next play, Rice caught a 15-yard reception at the 1-yard line, and then Gannon found Doug Jolley in the back of the end zone for a 1-yard touchdown pass, giving the Raiders a 21–17 lead. Then on the ensuing kickoff, rookie returner John Simon was stripped of the ball by Tim Johnson, and Alvis Whitted recovered the fumble for the Raiders on the Titans' 39-yard line, setting up a 43-yard field goal by Sebastian Janikowski on the last play of the first half, making the score 24–17.

The Titans took the second half kickoff and drove all the way to the Raiders' 22-yard line before McNair was sacked for an 11-yard loss on third down by John Parrella. Because Nedney had been injured making a tackle in the second quarter, Titans head coach Jeff Fisher decided to punt rather than attempt a long field goal. The next time they had the ball, Titans punter Craig Hentrich was tackled for a 6-yard loss by Johnson before he could kick the ball, giving the Raiders a first down on the Titans' 19-yard line. Janikowski then kicked another field goal to make the score 27–17. This time, the Titans managed to respond, driving 70 yards and scoring with McNair's 13-yard touchdown run to cut their deficit to 27–24. But the Raiders responded with a 66-yard drive, kept alive by a 14-yard pass interference penalty on Samari Rolle on a third down play in which Gannon threw an incompletion. Garner also made a big impact with an 18-yard run, and eventually Gannon capped the drive off with a 2-yard touchdown run in the fourth quarter. Fullback Zack Crockett later finished a 69-yard drive with a 7-yard touchdown run to put the game away.

Until the 2025 season, this was the last AFC Championship Game which has not featured Tom Brady, Peyton Manning, Ben Roethlisberger or Patrick Mahomes as a starting quarterback. With the Raiders' relocation to Las Vegas for 2020, this would prove to be the last playoff game played at the Oakland–Alameda County Coliseum. In addition, this is the most recent Raiders' playoff victory to date, as they would not qualify for the playoffs again until 2016.

This was the fourth postseason meeting between the Titans and Raiders. Oakland won all three previous meetings while the Titans were the Houston Oilers.

Previous playoff games
Oakland leads 3–0 in all-time playoff games

1967

Houston Oilers 7 @ Oakland Raiders 40

1967 AFL Championship Game

1969

Houston Oilers 7 @ Oakland Raiders 56

1969 AFL Divisional playoffs

1980

Houston Oilers 7 @ Oakland Raiders 27

1980 AFC Wild Card playoffs

== Super Bowl XXXVII: Tampa Bay Buccaneers 48, Oakland Raiders 21 ==
Super Bowl XXXVII – Oakland Raiders vs. Tampa Bay Buccaneers – Game summary

Quarter	1	2	3	4	Total
Raiders (AFC)	3	0	6	12	21
Buccaneers (NFC)	3	17	14	14	48

at Qualcomm Stadium, San Diego, California

- Date: January 26, 2003
- Game attendance: 67,603
- Referee: Bill Carollo
- TV announcers (ABC): Al Michaels (play-by-play) and John Madden (color commentator)

This was the first Super Bowl meeting between the Raiders and Buccaneers.

== Notes ==
- NFL.com scores for the 2002 playoffs (Last accessed January 9, 2006)
- ^{a} "New times announced for NFL playoff games". National Football League. October 31, 2002. Archived from the original on November 17, 2002.
