= Ben Taylor (American football) =

American football player and coach (born 1978)

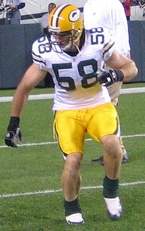
- Taylor with the Green Bay Packers in 2006

No. 58
- Position: Linebacker

Personal information
- Born: August 31, 1978 (age 48); Bellaire, Ohio, U.S.
- Listed height: 6 ft 2 in (1.88 m)
- Listed weight: 245 lb (111 kg)

Career information
- High school: Bellaire
- College: Virginia Tech
- NFL draft: 2002: 4th round, 111th overall pick

Career history

Playing
- Cleveland Browns (2002–2005); Green Bay Packers (2006)

Coaching
- Shenandoah University (2015–present) Wide receivers coach

Awards and highlights
- Second-team All-American (2001); Third-team All-American (2000)

Career NFL statistics
- Total tackles: 218
- Pass deflections: 4
- Interceptions: 1
- Stats at Pro Football Reference

Benjamin Frazier Taylor (born August 31, 1978) is an American former professional football player who was a linebacker in the National Football League (NFL). He played college football for the Virginia Tech Hokies. Taylor was elected to the Virginia Tech Sports Hall of Fame in 2017. He now teaches physical education and coaches football at Shenandoah University in Virginia.

== College career ==
Taylor was a standout for the Virginia Tech Hokies football team, earning All-American honors in 2000 and 2001. He led the Hokies in tackles his junior and senior seasons with 103 tackles in 2000 and 121 in 2001.

== Professional career ==
Taylor played in a total of 49 NFL games and had 218 tackles in four seasons with the Browns and one for the Green Bay Packers.

=== Cleveland Browns ===
Taylor selected by the Browns in the fourth round (111th overall) of the 2002 NFL draft. His best year was in 2005 when he was second on the Browns with 113 tackles.

=== Green Bay Packers ===
On March 26, 2006, the Packers signed Taylor to a one-year contract.

== NFL career statistics ==
Legend
**Bold**	Career high

Year	Team	Games		Tackles					Interceptions					Fumbles			
Year	Team	GP	GS	Cmb	Solo	Ast	Sck	TFL	Int	Yds	TD	Lng	PD	FF	FR	Yds	TD
2002	CLE	7	0	4	2	2	0.0	0	0	0	0	0	0	0	0	0	0
2003	CLE	13	8	81	65	16	0.0	**4**	**1**	0	0	0	1	0	0	0	0
2004	CLE	3	2	8	2	6	0.0	1	0	0	0	0	0	0	0	0	0
2005	CLE	**16**	**16**	**113**	**77**	**36**	0.0	2	0	0	0	0	**3**	0	0	0	0
2006	GNB	10	0	12	11	1	0.0	0	0	0	0	0	0	0	0	0	0
		49	26	218	157	61	0.0	7	1	0	0	0	4	0	0	0	0

== College Coaching ==
After finishing his pro career, Taylor is a wide receivers coach for the Shenandoah University football team.
