= Alvin McKinley =

American football player (born 1978)

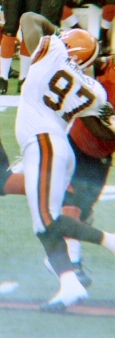
- McKinley with the Browns in 2004

No. 99, 70, 97
- Position: Defensive tackle

Personal information
- Born: June 9, 1978 (age 48); Jackson, Mississippi, U.S.
- Listed height: 6 ft 3 in (1.91 m)
- Listed weight: 294 lb (133 kg)

Career information
- High school: Weir (Weir, Mississippi)
- College: Mississippi State
- NFL draft: 2000: 4th round, 120th overall pick

Career history
- Carolina Panthers (2000); Cleveland Browns (2001–2006); Denver Broncos (2007); New Orleans Saints (2008)

Career NFL statistics
- Total tackles: 231
- Sacks: 11.5
- Forced fumbles: 2
- Fumble recoveries: 2
- Pass deflections: 3
- Stats at Pro Football Reference

Alvin Jerome McKinley (born June 9, 1978) is an American former professional football player who was a defensive tackle in the National Football League (NFL). He played college football for the Mississippi State Bulldogs and was selected by the Carolina Panthers in the fourth round of the 2000 NFL draft.

McKinley has also played for the Cleveland Browns, Denver Broncos and New Orleans Saints.

== Early life ==
McKinley was a standout at Weir High School in Weir, Mississippi. After winning two state championships, he joined his brother Dennis McKinley at Mississippi State University in the fall of 1996.

== Professional career ==
Pre-draft measurables
Height	Weight	Arm length	Hand span	40-yard dash	10-yard split	20-yard split	20-yard shuttle	Three-cone drill	Vertical jump	Broad jump	Bench press
6 ft 4 in (1.93 m)	289 lb (131 kg)	36 1/2 in (0.93 m)	10 1/4 in (0.26 m)	5.07 s	1.75 s	2.96 s	4.61 s	7.73 s	27.5 in (0.70 m)	8 ft 6 in (2.59 m)	22 reps
All values from NFL Combine

=== Carolina Panthers ===
McKinley was selected in the fourth round of the 2000 NFL draft (120th overall) by the Carolina Panthers.

=== Cleveland Browns ===
McKinley joined the Cleveland Browns in 2001. He had his best season in 2005, recording 68 tackles and five sacks.

=== New Orleans Saints ===
McKinley was signed by the New Orleans Saints on September 10, 2008, after defensive tackle Hollis Thomas was placed on injured reserve. McKinley was released on September 19 to make room for quarterback Joey Harrington.

== NFL career statistics ==
Legend
**Bold**	Career high

=== Regular season ===
Year	Team	Games		Tackles					Interceptions					Fumbles			
Year	Team	GP	GS	Cmb	Solo	Ast	Sck	TFL	Int	Yds	TD	Lng	PD	FF	FR	Yds	TD
2000	CAR	7	0	9	9	0	0.0	0	0	0	0	0	0	0	0	0	0
2001	CLE	7	0	12	6	6	0.0	0	0	0	0	0	0	0	0	0	0
2002	CLE	13	0	11	7	4	0.0	1	0	0	0	0	**2**	0	0	0	0
2003	CLE	9	0	23	9	14	0.0	0	0	0	0	0	0	0	0	0	0
2004	CLE	**16**	2	49	29	20	3.0	5	0	0	0	0	1	0	**2**	0	0
2005	CLE	**16**	**16**	**68**	**45**	**23**	**5.0**	**6**	0	0	0	0	0	**1**	0	0	0
2006	CLE	14	14	45	30	15	1.0	4	0	0	0	0	0	0	0	0	0
2007	DEN	15	10	14	11	3	2.5	1	0	0	0	0	0	**1**	0	0	0
		97	42	231	146	85	11.5	17	0	0	0	0	3	2	2	0	0

=== Playoffs ===
Year	Team	Games		Tackles					Interceptions					Fumbles			
Year	Team	GP	GS	Cmb	Solo	Ast	Sck	TFL	Int	Yds	TD	Lng	PD	FF	FR	Yds	TD
2002	CLE	**1**	0	**4**	**3**	**1**	**1.0**	**1**	0	0	0	0	**1**	0	0	0	0
		1	0	4	3	1	1.0	1	0	0	0	0	1	0	0	0	0
