= Michael Jameson =

American football player (born 1979)

No. 22
- Position: Cornerback

Personal information
- Born: July 14, 1979 (age 47); Killeen, Texas, U.S.
- Listed height: 5 ft 11 in (1.80 m)
- Listed weight: 205 lb (93 kg)

Career information
- College: Texas A&M
- NFL draft: 2001: 6th round, 165th overall pick

Career history
- Cleveland Browns (2001–2005)

Awards and highlights
- Second–team All–Big 12 (1999)

Career NFL statistics
- Tackles: 52
- Interceptions: 1
- Sacks: 1
- Stats at Pro Football Reference

Michael L. Jameson, Jr (born July 14, 1979) is an American former professional football player who was a cornerback for three seasons in the National Football League (NFL). He was selected in the sixth round of the 2001 NFL draft by the Cleveland Browns after playing college football for the Texas A&M Aggies.

== College career ==
Jameson played collegiately at Texas A&M University from 1997 to 2000. During his time with the Aggies, he played all three positions in the secondary: cornerback, free safety and strong safety. He intercepted seven passes during his career, returning three for a touchdown. He also recorded 190 tackles. In 1999, as a junior, he was named second–team All–Big 12 Conference.

== Professional career ==
The Cleveland Browns selected him in the sixth round of the 2001 NFL draft and on May 25, they signed him to a three–year contract. After being drafted by the Browns, Jameson said about his playing style, "I try to strike first, right at the point of attack. I like to try and use quickness, instincts and athletic ability to deliver the first blow." In the Browns' final preseason game against the Washington Redskins, Jameson broke his leg. He was placed on injured reserve on August 28. The following season, during final cuts, he was waived from the team, only to be re-signed to the practice squad the next day. However, on October 10, he was signed to the active roster. He made his NFL debut on October 13 against the Tampa Bay Buccaneers, recording one tackle in the game. The following week, against the Houston Texans, he received more playing time than he had in his debut. He tallied five tackles and one sack in the game, earning a game ball for his performance. On November 3, he recorded a season–high six tackles against the Pittsburgh Steelers and on December 22, he intercepted his first pass in the NFL. After the season, he became an exclusive-rights free agent and eventually re-signed a $300,000 contract with Cleveland. During training camp, after Robert Griffith broke his finger, Jameson was listed as one of the Browns' two starting safeties. However, Griffith returned before the season began. In 2003, Jameson played in 15 games for the Browns, recording 14 tackles. His season–high in tackles came in week 15 of the season against the Denver Broncos. Jameson, in 2004, played in all 16 games and recorded a career–high 17 tackles. In week 16, against Miami, he recorded four tackles, while the following week, against the Houston Texans, he tallied five tackles. Entering the 2005 season, he was the final member of the Browns' 2001 draft class that still remained on the roster. However, on September 3, he was suspended for four games for violating the league's substance–abuse policy. On October 14, after his suspension was lifted, he returned to practice with the Browns. The Browns terminated his contract on October 17.

== NFL career statistics ==
Legend
**Bold**	Career high

=== Regular season ===
Year	Team	Games		Tackles					Interceptions					Fumbles			
Year	Team	GP	GS	Cmb	Solo	Ast	Sck	TFL	Int	Yds	TD	Lng	PD	FF	FR	Yds	TD
2002	CLE	11	**1**	**19**	**16**	3	**1.0**	**1**	**1**	0	0	0	**1**	0	0	0	0
2003	CLE	15	0	15	7	**8**	0.0	0	0	0	0	0	0	0	0	0	0
2004	CLE	**16**	0	18	13	5	0.0	0	0	0	0	0	**1**	**1**	**1**	0	0
		42	1	52	36	16	1.0	1	1	0	0	0	2	1	1	0	0

=== Playoffs ===
Year	Team	Games		Tackles					Interceptions					Fumbles			
Year	Team	GP	GS	Cmb	Solo	Ast	Sck	TFL	Int	Yds	TD	Lng	PD	FF	FR	Yds	TD
2002	CLE	**1**	0	**1**	**1**	0	0.0	0	0	0	0	0	0	0	0	0	0
		1	0	1	1	0	0.0	0	0	0	0	0	0	0	0	0	0
