= Orpheus Roye =

American football player (born 1973)

No. 71, 99, 96
- Positions: Defensive end, defensive tackle

Personal information
- Born: January 21, 1973 (age 53); Miami, Florida, U.S.
- Listed height: 6 ft 4 in (1.93 m)
- Listed weight: 315 lb (143 kg)

Career information
- High school: Miami Springs (Miami Springs, Florida)
- College: Florida State
- NFL draft: 1996: 6th round, 200th overall pick

Career history
- Pittsburgh Steelers (1996–1999); Cleveland Browns (2000–2007); Pittsburgh Steelers (2008)

Awards and highlights
- Super Bowl champion (XLIII)

Career NFL statistics
- Total tackles: 499
- Sacks: 18.5
- Forced fumbles: 4
- Fumble recoveries: 5
- Interceptions: 2
- Stats at Pro Football Reference

Orpheus Michael Roye (born January 21, 1973) is an American former professional football player who was a defensive end in the National Football League (NFL). He was selected by the Pittsburgh Steelers in the sixth round of the 1996 NFL draft. In 2009, he won Super Bowl XLIII with the Steelers. He played college football for the Florida State Seminoles.

Roye also played for the Cleveland Browns.

== Amateur career ==
He graduated from Miami Springs High School in Miami Springs, Florida. He played for the legendary coach Buddy Goins at Miami Springs. He first attended Jones County Junior College in Ellisville, Mississippi, where he was named JC All-America, registering 76 tackles and 12 sacks. He then transferred to Florida State University.

== Professional career ==
=== Pittsburgh Steelers (first stint) ===
Roye was selected by the Pittsburgh Steelers in the sixth round of the 1996 NFL draft. He played for them from 1996 to 1999.

=== Cleveland Browns ===
Roye signed with the Cleveland Browns before the 2000 season. Orpheus was a mainstay for the Browns since 2000 with his reliable play and overall dependability. He underwent arthroscopic surgery on August 2, 2007. This is the same knee that caused his 2006 season to end early. He played for the Browns from 2000 to 2007.

=== Pittsburgh Steelers (second stint) ===
On August 17, 2008, Roye was re-signed by the Steelers after being released by the Browns. Coach Mike Tomlin called Roye, "a veteran defensive lineman, a guy who knows how to play the game, a professional." He became an unrestricted free agent at the end of the 2008 season.

== NFL career statistics ==
Legend
	Won the Super Bowl
**Bold**	Career high

=== Regular season ===
Year	Team	Games		Tackles				Interceptions				Fumbles			
Year	Team	GP	GS	Comb	Solo	Ast	Sck	Int	Yds	TD	Lng	FF	FR	Yds	TD
1996	PIT	13	1	3	1	2	0.0	0	0	0	0	0	**1**	0	0
1997	PIT	16	0	4	3	1	1.0	0	0	0	0	1	0	0	0
1998	PIT	16	9	42	29	13	3.5	0	0	0	0	0	0	0	0
1999	PIT	16	16	57	40	17	**4.5**	**1**	**2**	0	**2**	1	**1**	0	0
2000	CLE	16	16	55	42	13	2.0	0	0	0	0	0	**1**	**8**	0
2001	CLE	12	10	25	18	7	0.0	**1**	0	0	0	0	0	0	0
2002	CLE	16	16	55	38	17	0.5	0	0	0	0	**2**	0	0	0
2003	CLE	16	15	57	42	15	1.5	0	0	0	0	0	**1**	0	0
2004	CLE	15	14	38	30	8	1.0	0	0	0	0	0	0	0	0
2005	CLE	16	16	**88**	**65**	**23**	3.0	0	0	0	0	0	**1**	0	0
2006	CLE	9	9	32	26	6	1.0	0	0	0	0	0	0	0	0
2007	CLE	13	6	37	24	13	0.5	0	0	0	0	0	0	0	0
2008	PIT	6	0	6	3	3	0.0	0	0	0	0	0	0	0	0
		180	128	499	361	138	18.5	2	2	0	2	4	5	8	0

=== Playoffs ===
Year	Team	Games		Tackles				Interceptions				Fumbles			
Year	Team	GP	GS	Comb	Solo	Ast	Sck	Int	Yds	TD	Lng	FF	FR	Yds	TD
1996	PIT	2	0	3	1	**2**	**1.0**	0	0	0	0	0	0	0	0
1997	PIT	2	0	0	0	0	0.0	0	0	0	0	0	0	0	0
2002	CLE	1	1	**4**	**3**	1	**1.0**	0	0	0	0	0	0	0	0
		5	1	7	4	3	2.0	0	0	0	0	0	0	0	0
