= Kelly Holcomb =

American football player (born 1973)

No. 13, 10
- Position: Quarterback

Personal information
- Born: July 9, 1973 (age 53); Fayetteville, Tennessee, U.S.
- Listed height: 6 ft 2 in (1.88 m)
- Listed weight: 216 lb (98 kg)

Career information
- High school: Lincoln County (Fayetteville)
- College: Middle Tennessee State (1991–1994)
- NFL draft: 1995: undrafted

Career history
- Tampa Bay Buccaneers (1995)*; → Barcelona Dragons (1996); Indianapolis Colts (1996–2000); Cleveland Browns (2001–2004); Buffalo Bills (2005–2006); Philadelphia Eagles (2007)*; Minnesota Vikings (2007)
- * Offseason or practice squad member only

Career NFL statistics
- Passing attempts: 893
- Passing completions: 565
- Completion percentage: 63.3%
- TD–INT: 39–38
- Passing yards: 5,916
- Passer rating: 79.2
- Stats at Pro Football Reference

Bryan Kelly Holcomb (born July 9, 1973) is an American former professional football player who was a quarterback in the National Football League (NFL). He played college football for the Middle Tennessee Blue Raiders. Holcomb was signed by the Tampa Bay Buccaneers as an undrafted free agent after the 1995 NFL draft. He was also a member of the Indianapolis Colts, Cleveland Browns, Buffalo Bills, Philadelphia Eagles, and Minnesota Vikings.

== Early life ==
Holcomb attended Lincoln County High School in Fayetteville, Tennessee, and was a student and lettered in football as a quarterback, baseball as a shortstop, and basketball and led his football team to the 1990 Tennessee State Championship.

== College career ==
Holcomb played college football at Middle Tennessee State University. During his freshman season in 1991, his near-perfect performance versus then No. 1 ranked Florida State at Doak Campbell Stadium versus a secondary that featured future NFL players Terrell Buckley and Clifton Abraham put him on the map. For the day, Holcomb completed 20 of 28 passes for 188 yards in his first college start.

He finally broke out statistically as a senior, throwing for over 2,000 yards with 15 TD.

- 1991: 130/209 for 1,763 yards with 5 TD vs 4 INT.
- 1992: 92/168 for 1,409 yards with 9 TD vs 6 INT.
- 1993: 133/240 for 1,738 yards with 7 TD vs 6 INT.
- 1994: 146/244 for 2,154 yards with 15 TD vs 9 INT.

== Professional career ==
=== Tampa Bay Buccaneers ===
After going undrafted in the 1995 NFL draft, Holcomb signed with the Tampa Bay Buccaneers on May 1, 1995. He was released on August 22, signed to the team's practice squad on August 29, released again on September 19, signed to the practice squad again on October 4, released for the third time on October 17, and signed to the practice squad for the third time on December 19, 1995.

Holcomb became a free agent after the 1995 season and re-signed with Tampa Bay on February 17, 1996. He was allocated to the World League of American Football (WLAF), where he started all ten games for the Barcelona Dragons during the 1996 WLAF season. Holcomb finished his lone WLAF season with totals of 191 completions on 319 passing attempts (59.9%) for 2,382 yards, 14 touchdowns, and 16 interceptions. He also rushed 38 times for 111 yards and two touchdowns. The Dragons went 5–5 with Holcomb as the starter.

Holcomb was released by the Buccaneers for the final time on August 19, 1996, as the team opted to go with Scott Milanovich as the No. 3 quarterback.

=== Indianapolis Colts ===
Holcomb was signed to the Indianapolis Colts' practice squad on November 27, 1996. He was promoted to the active roster on December 12, 1996, but did not play in a regular season game that season. In 1997, a disappointing season, Holcomb played five games and started one in which he threw only one touchdown and eight interceptions. Holcomb never saw action in a regular season game for the Colts again. He served as a backup to Peyton Manning from 1998 to 2000.

=== Cleveland Browns ===
Holcomb was released by Indianapolis on February 28, 2001, to be allowed to compete for the starting job with the Cleveland Browns, following Bruce Arians who left as the QB coach of the Colts to become the offensive coordinator of the Browns. The Browns had drafted Tim Couch with the number 1 pick in the 1999 draft. During their time in Cleveland, Holcomb occasionally outshined the former number one pick. In his first season as a Brown, Holcomb played in only one game which he completed seven of twelve passes for 114 yards and a passing touchdown. In Holcomb's second season in 2002, he played in four games and started two games in which he threw eight touchdowns and four interceptions with 790 passing yards. In January 2003, Holcomb started in place of an injured Couch in the Wild Card round against the Pittsburgh Steelers. Holcomb became the third quarterback in playoff history to throw for more than 400 yards. He finished the game with 429 yards, a new postseason record for a regulation game, but Cleveland lost 36–33.

In 2003, Holcomb's third season, he had more playing time playing ten games and starting eight of them. He replaced Couch as starting quarterback during that season. Overall in 2003, he threw ten touchdowns and twelve interceptions. In his final season as a Brown Jeff Garcia replaced him as starting quarterback. Holcomb only played in four games and started two of them in which he threw seven touchdowns and five interceptions with 737 yards passing.

=== Buffalo Bills ===
Holcomb went to the Buffalo Bills before the 2005 season. He started half of the games in his first season as a Bill while J. P. Losman started the other half. Holcomb threw ten touchdowns and eight interceptions with 1,509 passing yards that season. In Holcomb's second and final season as a Bill he didn't play a regular season game the whole season.

=== Philadelphia Eagles ===
Holcomb was traded on March 26, 2007, to the Philadelphia Eagles with Takeo Spikes for Darwin Walker and a conditional 2008 draft pick, which the Bills would use to select Stevie Johnson.

=== Minnesota Vikings ===
On August 27, 2007, the Eagles traded Holcomb to the Minnesota Vikings for a sixth round pick in the 2009 NFL draft. Holcomb played and started three games that season throwing two touchdowns and an interception with 515 passing yards. After the 2007 season, the Vikings went on to release him on February 27, 2008.

On July 7, 2008, it was announced that Holcomb would retire from the NFL.

== Broadcasting career/post-playing career ==
In 2008, Holcomb joined his alma mater Middle Tennessee as the color commentator for the Blue Raider Radio Network. In addition, Holcomb has broadcast the TSSAA Blue Cross Bowl and was a broadcast member of the Music City Bowl Preview.

In February 2015, it was announced that Holcomb would be joining the coaching staff at Riverdale (Tenn.) HS, where he would be handling offensive coordinator duties.

== NFL career statistics ==
Legend
	Led the league
**Bold**	Career high

=== Regular season ===
Year	Team	Games			Passing									Rushing					Sacked		Fumbles	
Year	Team	GP	GS	Record	Cmp	Att	Pct	Yds	Avg	Lng	TD	Int	Rtg	Att	Yds	Avg	Lng	TD	Sck	SckY	Fum	Lost
1997	IND	5	1	0–1	45	73	61.6	454	6.2	41	1	8	44.3	5	5	1.0	3	0	11	76	4	–
2001	CLE	1	0	–	7	12	58.3	114	**9.5**	25	1	**0**	**118.1**	1	0	0.0	0	0	0	0	0	0
2002	CLE	4	2	1–1	64	106	60.4	790	7.5	44	8	4	92.9	8	9	**1.1**	7	0	5	40	1	–
2003	CLE	10	8	2–6	**193**	**302**	63.9	**1,797**	6.0	**68**	**10**	12	74.6	8	7	0.9	6	0	**21**	**166**	5	2
2004	CLE	4	2	1–1	59	87	**67.8**	737	8.5	55	7	5	96.8	3	-2	-0.7	–	0	5	31	1	0
2005	BUF	10	8	**4–4**	155	230	67.4	1,509	6.6	65	**10**	8	85.6	**18**	**11**	0.6	**8**	**1**	17	40	**13**	**5**
2007	MIN	3	3	0–3	42	83	50.6	515	6.2	40	2	1	73.1	0	0	0.0	–	0	12	87	1	0
Career		37	24	8–16	565	893	63.3	5,916	6.6	68	39	38	79.2	43	30	0.7	8	1	71	540	25	7

=== Postseason ===
Year	Team	Games			Passing									Rushing					Sacked		Fumbles	
Year	Team	GP	GS	Record	Cmp	Att	Pct	Yds	Avg	Lng	TD	Int	Rtg	Att	Yds	Avg	Lng	TD	Sck	SckY	Fum	Lost
2002	CLE	1	1	0–1	26	43	60.5	429	10.0	83	3	1	107.6	2	3	1.5	4	0	1	5	0	0
Career		1	1	0–1	26	43	60.5	429	10.0	83	3	1	107.6	2	3	1.5	4	0	1	5	0	0
