= William Green (American football) =

American football player (born 1979)

No. 31
- Position: Running back

Personal information
- Born: December 17, 1979 (age 46); Atlantic City, New Jersey, U.S.
- Listed height: 6 ft 0 in (1.83 m)
- Listed weight: 214 lb (97 kg)

Career information
- High school: Holy Spirit (Absecon, New Jersey)
- College: Boston College (1998–2001)
- NFL draft: 2002: 1st round, 16th overall pick

Career history
- Cleveland Browns (2002–2005)

Awards and highlights
- PFWA All-Rookie Team (2002); Consensus All-American (2001); 2× First-team All-Big East (2000, 2001); Big East Offensive Player of the Year (2001)

Career NFL statistics
- Games played: 46
- Rushing attempts: 568
- Rushing yards: 2,109
- Rushing touchdowns: 9
- Receptions: 45
- Receiving yards: 277
- Stats at Pro Football Reference

William Green (born December 17, 1979) is an American former professional football player who was a running back for the Cleveland Browns of the National Football League (NFL). He played college football for the Boston College Eagles, receiving consensus All-American honors in 2001. The Browns chose him in the first round of the 2002 NFL draft and he appeared in 46 games for Cleveland between 2002 and 2005.

== Early life ==
Green was born in Atlantic City, New Jersey. His father was a heroin addict who died of AIDS when Green was 13 years old. His mother died of the disease a year later after being infected by his father. After his parents' deaths, Green was separated from his four siblings.

Green attended Holy Spirit High School in Absecon, New Jersey, where he played for the Holy Spirit Spartans high school football team and received multiple high school All-American honors.

== College career ==
Green received an athletic scholarship to attend Boston College, and played for their Eagles football teams from 1998 to 2001. In two years as a starting running back, he compiled over 2,700 yards rushing and 32 touchdowns. He was a first-team All-Big East Conference selection in 2000 and 2001, was honored as the Big East Offensive Player of the Year, and was recognized as a consensus first-team All-American in 2001, after receiving first-team honors from the American Football Coaches Association (AFCA), The Sporting News, the Walter Camp Football Foundation, Football News and Pro Football Weekly.

=== College statistics ===
| | | | Rushing | | | | Receiving | | |
| Year | Team | GP | Att | Yards | Avg | TDs | Rec | Yards | TDs |
|---|---|---|---|---|---|---|---|---|---|
| 1999 | Boston College | 10 | 49 | 251 | 5.1 | 4 | 2 | 5 | 0 |
| 2000 | Boston College | 11 | 187 | 1,164 | 6.2 | 14 | 6 | 78 | 1 |
| 2001 | Boston College | 10 | 265 | 1,559 | 5.9 | 15 | 23 | 260 | 2 |
| College totals | | 31 | 501 | 2,974 | 5.9 | 33 | 31 | 343 | 3 |

== Professional career ==
Pre-draft measurables
| Height | Weight | Arm length | Hand span | 40-yard dash | 10-yard split | 20-yard split | Vertical jump | Broad jump | Bench press |
|---|---|---|---|---|---|---|---|---|---|
| 6 ft 0 1/4 in (1.84 m) | 221 lb (100 kg) | 31 1/2 in (0.80 m) | 7 3/4 in (0.20 m) | 4.60 s | 1.60 s | 2.69 s | 42.0 in (1.07 m) | 10 ft 1 in (3.07 m) | 27 reps |
All values from NFL Combine

In the 2002 NFL Draft, Green was a top-rated player. However, two college suspensions for marijuana use hurt his stock on draft day.

Cleveland selected him as 16th overall pick in the first round of the 2002 NFL Draft. As a rookie in 2002, Green appeared in all 16 regular season games and started ten of them, gaining 887 yards and scoring six touchdowns. In a home game with playoff implications versus Atlanta late in the season, Green provided Browns fans with one of the most memorable moments of the new Browns. He ran for a 64-yard touchdown to put the Browns ahead for good in a play known as "Run William Run!" due to radio play by play man Jim Donovan's call of the play.

His 2003 season, however, was fraught with turmoil. After a good start with 559 yards, Green was arrested for drunk driving and marijuana possession. Green was also notoriously seen wearing one shoe and one sock during the arrest. The arrest led to a four-game suspension under the league's substance abuse policy. While under suspension, Green's fiancée, Asia Gray, stabbed him in the back during a domestic dispute. The league extended his suspension through the end of the 2003 season "for treatment purposes."

In 2004, Green gained 585 yards on the season. On November 14, he was ejected prior to a game with the Pittsburgh Steelers for fighting with linebacker Joey Porter. Around this time, he had disclosed that he was having a child with a woman other than his wife.

His final season in Cleveland was an injury-plagued 2005 campaign where he appeared in eight games and gained only 78 yards. The Browns placed him on injured reserve at the end of training camp in 2006 and reached an injury settlement with Green allowing them to release him.

In March 2008, it was reported that Green would attempt to play in the NFL again after two seasons out of the league. He worked out at his alma mater Boston College's Pro Day on March 19, showing up in "great shape," bench-pressing 225 pounds 25 times and posting a 42-inch vertical leap, and also ran a 4.85 forty yard dash. However, he did not sign a contract.

=== NFL statistics ===
Rushing stats

| Year | Team | Games | Carries | Yards | Yards per carry | Longest carry | Touchdowns | First downs | Fumbles | Fumbles lost |
|---|---|---|---|---|---|---|---|---|---|---|
| 2002 | CLE | 16 | 243 | 887 | 3.7 | 64 | 6 | 38 | 3 | 1 |
| 2003 | CLE | 7 | 142 | 559 | 3.9 | 26 | 1 | 30 | 5 | 2 |
| 2004 | CLE | 15 | 163 | 585 | 3.6 | 46 | 2 | 30 | 3 | 2 |
| 2005 | CLE | 8 | 20 | 78 | 3.9 | 17 | 0 | 4 | 0 | 0 |
| Career | | 46 | 568 | 2,109 | 3.7 | 64 | 9 | 102 | 11 | 5 |

Receiving stats

| Year | Team | Games | Receptions | Targets | Yards | Yards per Reception | Longest Reception | Touchdowns | First Downs | Fumbles | Fumbles Lost |
|---|---|---|---|---|---|---|---|---|---|---|---|
| 2002 | CLE | 16 | 16 | - | 113 | 7.1 | 18 | 0 | 5 | 1 | 1 |
| 2003 | CLE | 7 | 10 | - | 50 | 5.0 | 12 | 0 | 2 | 0 | 0 |
| 2004 | CLE | 15 | 14 | - | 84 | 6.0 | 17 | 0 | 3 | 0 | 0 |
| 2005 | CLE | 8 | 5 | - | 30 | 6.0 | 14 | 0 | 0 | 0 | 0 |
| Career | | 46 | 45 | 0 | 277 | 6.2 | 18 | 0 | 10 | 1 | 1 |

== Personal life ==
Prior to his 2008 NFL comeback attempt, Green became a Christian. He became a motivational speaker at corporate, church, and school events. His speeches are typically about forgiveness and overcoming struggles. In 2012, he became an ordained minister.

He is the father of eight children, seven with his wife, Asia Gray, and one from a previous relationship. All eight children live with him and his wife on a four-acre property in Berlin, New Jersey.
