= David Young (American football) =

American gridiron football player (born 1979)

No. 37
- Position: Safety

Personal information
- Born: May 17, 1979 (age 47); Columbia, South Carolina, U.S.
- Listed height: 6 ft 1 in (1.85 m)
- Listed weight: 209 lb (95 kg)

Career information
- High school: W. J. Keenan (Columbia)
- College: Georgia Southern
- NFL draft: 2003: 6th round, 179th overall pick

Career history
- Jacksonville Jaguars (2003); Cleveland Browns (2003)*; New York Jets (2003); Cleveland Browns (2003–2004)*; Green Bay Packers (2004)*; Houston Texans (2004–2005)*; Edmonton Eskimos (2006)*
- * Offseason or practice squad member only

Awards and highlights
- 2× NCAA Division I-AA national champion (1999–2000); Third-team All-American (2002); 2× First-team All-Southern (2001–2002)

Career NFL statistics
- Tackles: 5
- Stats at Pro Football Reference

David Fair Young (born May 17, 1979) is an American former professional football player who was a safety in the National Football League (NFL). He was selected by the Jacksonville Jaguars in the sixth round of the 2003 NFL draft. He played college football for the Georgia Southern Eagles.

Young was also a member of the Cleveland Browns, New York Jets, Green Bay Packers, Houston Texans and Edmonton Eskimos.

== Early life ==
Young attended W.J. Keenan High School in Columbia, South Carolina.

== College career ==
Young played college football for the Georgia Southern Eagles and was a four-year starter at strong safety. He played in 57 games, starting 39, during his college career, recording 289 tackles (177 of which were solo), six forced fumbles, two fumble recoveries, 10 interceptions, 20 pass breakups, six blocked kicks and three touchdowns. He was named an honorable mention All-American by the Football Gazette his junior year in 2001. He also earned the following All-American honors his senior season in 2002: Associated Press (third-team), Sports Network (third-team), and Football Gazette (honorable mention). Young garnered first-team Southern Conference recognition in 2001 and 2002 as well.

He helped Georgia Southern win the NCAA Division I-AA national championship in 1999 and 2000. He graduated from Georgia Southern with a Bachelor of Science in sport management. Young was inducted into the Georgia Southern Athletics Hall of Fame in 2022.

== Professional career ==
Young was selected by the Jacksonville Jaguars in the sixth round of the 2003 NFL draft. He officially signed with the team on July 24, 2003. He was waived by the Jaguars on September 8, 2003.

Young was signed to the practice squad of the Cleveland Browns on September 12, 2003.

He was signed by the New York Jets off of the Browns' practice squad on October 15, 2003. He played in five games for the Jets in 2003, recording five solo tackles. Young was waived/injured on December 5 and reverted to injured reserve on December 8. He was waived by the Jets on December 17, 2003.

He was re-signed to the Browns' practice squad on December 22, 2003. He signed a reserve/future contract with the Browns on December 29, 2003. He was waived on August 31, 2004.

Young was signed to the practice squad of the Green Bay Packers on October 19, 2004. He was released on November 23, 2004.

He was signed to the Houston Texans' practice squad on December 8, 2004. He signed a reserve/future contract with the Texans on January 5, 2005. He was waived on June 16, 2005.

Young signed with the Edmonton Eskimos of the Canadian Football League on May 16, 2006. He was released by the Eskimos on May 30, 2006.
