= Ben Miller (American football) =

American football coach and player (born 1979)

Current position
- Title: Off Field Assistant
- Team: Illinois
- Conference: Big Ten

Biographical details
- Born: August 18, 1979 (age 47); Columbia Station, Ohio

Playing career
- 1998–2001: Air Force
- 2002–2005: Cleveland Browns*
- 2005: Hamburg Sea Devils*
- 2005: Philadelphia Eagles*
- Positions: Running back, offensive lineman, fullback, H-back, Long snapper, tight end

Coaching career (HC unless noted)
- 2002–2003: Air Force (GA)
- 2006: Illinois (GA)
- 2007: Air Force (TE)
- 2008–2011: Air Force (Specialists/TE)
- 2012–2020: Air Force (STC/RB)
- 2021–2022: Illinois (STC/TE)
- 2023–present: Illinois (Assistant)

Accomplishments and honors

Awards
- Second-team All-MW (2001)

Benjamin Thomas Miller (born August 18, 1979) is an American football coach and former player who is serving as an assistant for Illinois. Prior to being hired at Illinois, he was the special teams coordinator for his alma mater Air Force.

== Playing career ==
At Air Force starting at left tackle his junior and senior years. Miller was elected as an all-conference offensive lineman for the Falcons. After completing active service for the Air Force and being made a reserve, Miller signed a contract with the Cleveland Browns where he was used as a fullback/tight end/long snapper/H-back. During his. During the NFL offseason, he worked as a public affairs officer for the Air Force recruiting and working in public relations. In the fall of 2005, he joined the practice squad for the Philadelphia Eagles after a stint in NFL Europe in Hamburg.

== Coaching career ==
While on active service in the Air Force, Miller began his coaching career serving as a graduate assistant at the Air Force Academy. After retiring from his playing his career, Miller became a graduate assistant at Illinois in 2006. In 2007 he returned to his alma mater as the team's tight ends coach. In 2008 he was given the additional responsibility of coaching specialist. In 2012 he was named Air Forces’ special teams coordinator and running backs coach a position he held until the end of the 2020 season. In 2021 Miller returned to Illinois this time as the team's special teams coordinator and tight ends coach under Bret Bielema. In the middle of 2022 he left his on the field coaching role to focus on his fight with cancer, this continued in 2023.

== Personal life ==
Miller is married to Meghan Carney. The couple has three children. It was announced in 2022 that Miller was fighting cancer.
