= Felipe Claybrooks =

American football player (born 1978)

No. 74, 91
- Position: Defensive end

Personal information
- Born: January 22, 1978 (age 48); Decatur, Georgia, U.S.
- Listed height: 6 ft 5 in (1.96 m)
- Listed weight: 275 lb (125 kg)

Career information
- High school: Decatur
- College: Georgia Tech (1998-2000)
- NFL draft: 2001: undrafted

Career history
- Arizona Cardinals (2001)*; Cleveland Browns (2001–2003); Cleveland Browns (2004)*; Philadelphia Soul (2007)
- * Offseason or practice squad member only

Career NFL statistics
- Total tackles: 4
- Stats at Pro Football Reference

Career AFL statistics
- Total tackles: 5
- Sacks: 1
- Fumble recoveries: 1
- Pass deflections: 2
- Stats at ArenaFan.com

Felipe Claybrooks (born January 22, 1978) is an American former professional football player who was a defensive end for the Cleveland Browns of the National Football League (NFL) in 2001 and 2003. He played in NFL Europa for the Cologne Centurions. He attended Decatur High School and played college football for the Georgia Tech Yellow Jackets.
