= Andre King =

Jamaican gridiron football player (born 1973)

No. 84
- Position: Wide receiver

Personal information
- Born: November 26, 1973 (age 52); Kingston, Jamaica
- Listed height: 5 ft 11 in (1.80 m)
- Listed weight: 195 lb (88 kg)

Career information
- High school: Stranahan (Fort Lauderdale, Florida, U.S.)
- College: Miami (FL) (1997-2000)
- NFL draft: 2001: 7th round, 245th overall pick

Career history
- Cleveland Browns (2001–2004)

Career NFL statistics
- Games played: 42
- Receptions: 30
- Receiving yards: 327
- Stats at Pro Football Reference

Andre Omar King (born November 26, 1973) is a Jamaican-American former professional football wide receiver in the National Football League (NFL). He was selected by the Cleveland Browns in the seventh round of the 2001 NFL draft. He played for the Browns from 2001 to 2004. He went to the University of Miami for college. He also played baseball in the MLB's Atlanta Braves and Cincinnati Reds farm systems.

King attended Stranahan High School in Fort Lauderdale, Florida and was a letterman in football and baseball. In football, he was an All-County selection and an All-State selection. In baseball, as a senior, he posted a .492 batting average with seven home runs, and 30 stolen bases.

He is now the head football coach and athletic director at Loganville Christian Academy in Loganville, Georgia.
