= National Register of Historic Places listings in Union County, Florida =

Location of Union County in Florida

This is a list of the National Register of Historic Places listings in Union County, Florida.

This is intended to be a complete list of the properties on the National Register of Historic Places in Union County, Florida, United States. The locations of National Register properties for which the latitude and longitude coordinates are included below, may be seen in a map.

There are 4 properties listed on the National Register in the county.

This National Park Service list is complete through NPS recent listings posted May 1, 2026.

Contents: Counties in Florida (non-linked contain no National Register listings)
Alachua - Baker - Bay - Bradford - Brevard - Broward - Calhoun - Charlotte - Citrus - Clay - Collier - Columbia - DeSoto - Dixie - Duval - Escambia - Flagler - Franklin - Gadsden - Gilchrist - Glades - Gulf - Hamilton - Hardee - Hendry - Hernando - Highlands - Hillsborough (Tampa) - Holmes - Indian River - Jackson - Jefferson - Lafayette - Lake - Lee - Leon - Levy - Liberty - Madison - Manatee - Marion - Martin - Miami-Dade (Miami) - Monroe - Nassau - Okaloosa - Okeechobee - Orange - Osceola - Palm Beach - Pasco - Pinellas - Polk - Putnam - St. Johns - St. Lucie - Santa Rosa - Sarasota - Seminole - Sumter - Suwannee - Taylor - Union - Volusia - Wakulla - Walton - Washington

== Current listings ==
	Name on the Register	Image	Date listed	Location	City or town	Description
1	John A. King House	John A. King House	April 6, 2004 (#04000264)	105 Southeast 1st Avenue; 30°01′20″N 82°20′14″W	Lake Butler	NRHP# 04000264
2	Lake Butler Woman's Club	Lake Butler Woman's Club	December 23, 2003 (#03001309)	285 Northeast First Avenue; 30°01′31″N 82°20′14″W	Lake Butler	NRHP# 03001309, Part of the Clubhouses of Florida's Woman's Clubs MPS
3	Townsend Building	Townsend Building	October 8, 1992 (#92001359)	410 West Main Street; 30°01′21″N 82°20′33″W	Lake Butler	NRHP# 92001359
4	James W. Townsend House	James W. Townsend House	February 29, 1996 (#96000222)	235 Southwest 4th Avenue; 30°01′14″N 82°20′31″W	Lake Butler	NRHP# 96000222

== See also ==
- List of National Historic Landmarks in Florida
- National Register of Historic Places listings in Florida
