= Union County High School =

There are several secondary schools called Union County High School in the United States:

- Union County High School (Florida) located in Lake Butler, Union County, Florida
- Union County High School (Georgia) located in Blairsville, Georgia
- Union County High School (Indiana) located in Liberty, Indiana
- Union County High School (Kentucky) located in Morganfield, Kentucky
- Union County High School (South Carolina) located in Union, South Carolina
- Union County High School (Tennessee), formerly Horace Maynard High School, located in Maynardville, Tennessee
