= Union County School District =

Union County School District can refer to:

- Union County School District (Florida)
- Union County School District (Georgia)
- Union County School District (Mississippi)
- Union County Schools (South Carolina)
