= UCSD (disambiguation) =

UCSD most commonly refers to the University of California, San Diego.

It may also refer to:

- Uinta County School District #1
- Uinta County School District #4
- Uinta County School District #6
- Unalaska City School District
- Union County School District (Florida)
- Union County School District (Georgia)
- Union County School District (Mississippi)
- Universidad Católica Santo Domingo
- Utica City School District
