= Townsend House =

Townsend House, Farm, or Farmhouse may refer to:

== Australia ==
- CanDo4Kids, previously known as Townsend House, a South Australian charity founded in 1874

== United States ==
(by state)

- Townsend Farmhouse, Hollywood, Alabama, listed on the NRHP in Alabama
- Thomas B. Townsend House, Montrose, Colorado, listed on the NRHP in Colorado
- Townsend House (Washington, D.C.), built for Richard H. Townsend, now the Cosmos Club
- James W. Townsend House (Lake Butler, Florida), listed on the NRHP in Florida
- James W. Townsend House (Orange Springs, Florida), listed on the NRHP in Florida
- Townsend Home, Stockton, Illinois, listed on the NRHP in Illinois
- Townsend House (Ruston, Louisiana), listed on the NRHP in Louisiana
- Townsend House & Pullen Museum, Catonsville, Maryland
- Townsend House (Needham, Massachusetts), listed on the NRHP in Massachusetts
- Townsend House (Wellfleet, Massachusetts), listed on the NRHP in Massachusetts
- George Townsend House, Tecumseh, Nebraska, listed on the NRHP in Nebraska
- Jabez Townsend House, Harrisville, New Hampshire, listed on the NRHP in New Hampshire
- Townsend Farm, Dublin, New Hampshire, listed on the NRHP in New Hampshire
- William S. Townsend House, Dennisville, New Jersey, listed on the NRHP in New Jersey
- Henry Townsend House, Huntington, New York, listed on the NRHP in New York
- Townsend House, renamed Raynham Hall in 1850, Oyster Bay, New York, listed on the NRHP in New York
- William T. Townsend House, Sandusky, Ohio, listed on the NRHP in Ohio
- Townsend House (Pughtown, Pennsylvania), listed on the NRHP in Pennsylvania
- Townsend-Wilkins House, Victoria, Texas, listed on the NRHP in Texas
- Townsend North House, Vassar, Michigan, listed on the NRHP in Michigan

== See also ==
- James W. Townsend House (disambiguation)
