= Union County Courthouse =

Union County Courthouse or Old Union County Courthouse may refer to:

- Union County Courthouse (Arkansas), El Dorado, Arkansas
- Union County Courthouse (Florida), Lake Butler, Florida
- Old Union County Courthouse (Georgia), Blairsville, Georgia
- Union County Courthouse (Illinois), Jonesboro, Illinois
- Union County Courthouse (Indiana), Liberty, Indiana
- Union County Courthouse (Iowa), Creston, Iowa
- Union County Courthouse (Kentucky), Morganfield, Kentucky
- Union County Courthouse (Mississippi), listed on the National Register of Historic Places
- Union County Courthouse (New Jersey), Elizabeth, New Jersey
- Union County Courthouse (New Mexico), Clayton, New Mexico
- Union County Courthouse (North Carolina), Monroe, North Carolina
- Old Union County Courthouse (Pennsylvania), New Berlin, Pennsylvania
