= Kevin Alexander =

Kevin Alexander may refer to:

- Kevin Alexander (wide receiver) (born 1975), former American football wide receiver for the New York Giants
- Kevin Alexander (linebacker) (born 1987), American football linebacker for the Denver Broncos
