= Hugh Dukes =

American politician

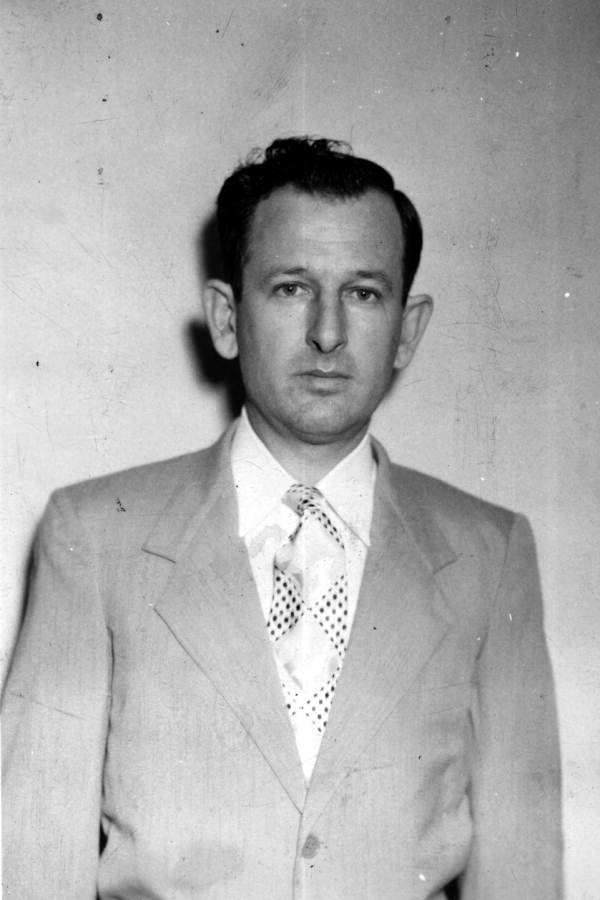
- Dukes in 1951

Member of the Florida House of Representatives from Jackson County
- In office 1951–1956

Personal details
- Born: August 18, 1911 Union County, Florida, U.S.
- Died: March 13, 2003 (aged 91)
- Party: Democratic

Hugh Dukes (August 18, 1911 – March 13, 2003) was an American politician. He served as a Democratic member of the Florida House of Representatives.

== Life and career ==
Dukes was born in Union County, Florida.

Dukes served in the Florida House of Representatives from 1951 to 1956.

Dukes died on March 13, 2003, at the age of 91.
