= New River Public Library Cooperative =

New River Public Library Cooperative is a three county public library cooperative in north central Florida. The libraries in Baker, Bradford and Union Counties are members.

Established in 1996, New River Public Library Cooperative supports and enhances public library services in the three county area. New River Public Library Cooperative is governed by two County Commissioners from each member county.

The Cooperative provides bookmobile service to the three counties, outreach to local child care centers, and telecommunications and automation support to the member libraries. Reciprocal borrowing agreements allow patrons to register for library services in Alachua, Columbia and Nassau Counties. Residents of Bradford County can also register for library services in Putnam and Clay Counties.

== Branches ==
The New River Public Library Cooperative consists of one branch in each participating county.

Baker County

The Emily Taber Public library is housed in the Peg McCollum Building in Macclenny.

Bradford County

The Bradford County Public Library is located in Starke.

Union County

The Union County Public Library is located in Lake Butler.
