= C. J. Spiller =

American football player and coach (born 1987)

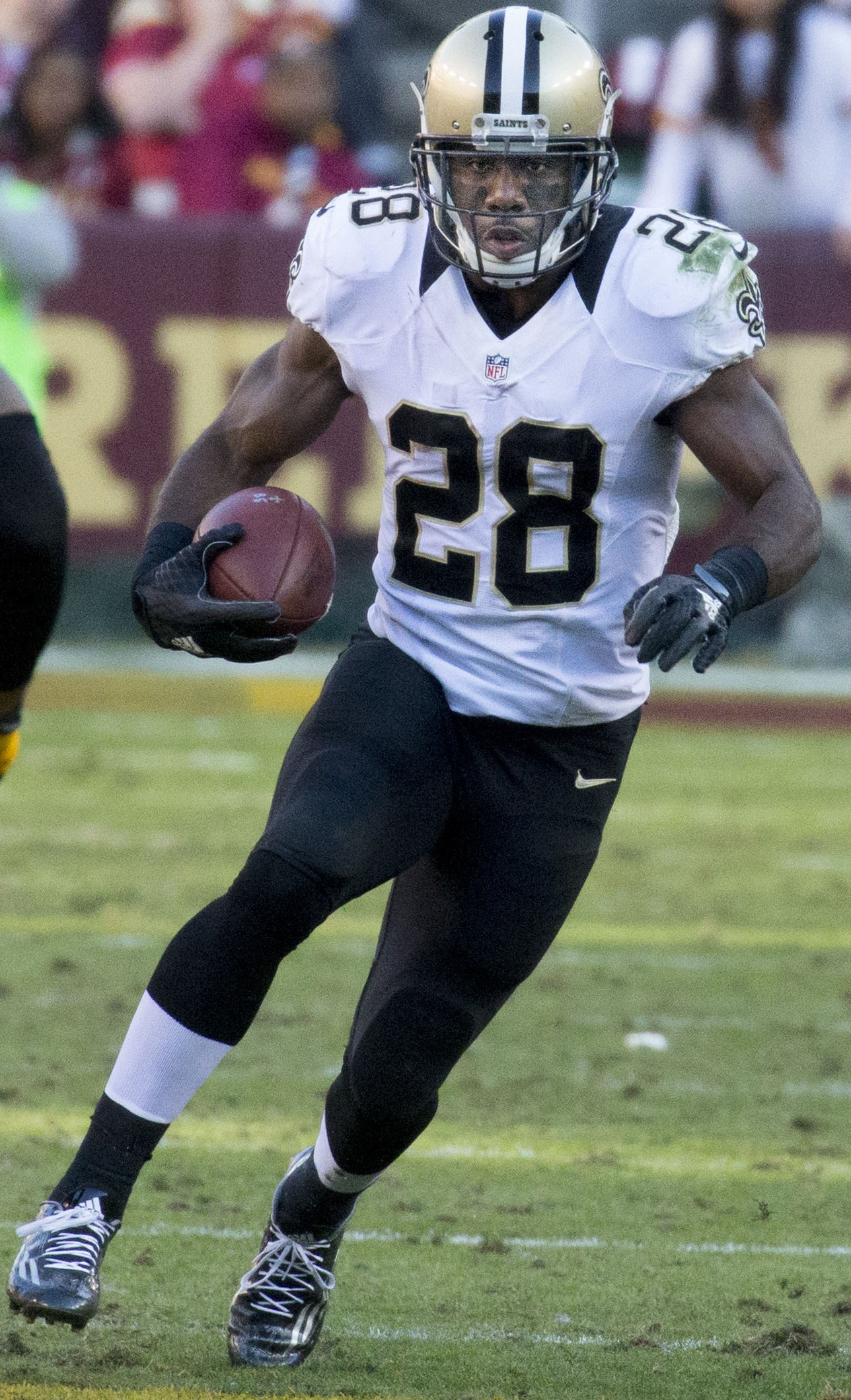
- Spiller with the New Orleans Saints in 2015

Clemson Tigers
- Title: Running backs coach

Personal information
- Born: August 5, 1987 (age 39); Lake Butler, Florida, U.S.
- Listed height: 5 ft 11 in (1.80 m)
- Listed weight: 200 lb (91 kg)

Career information
- Positions: Running back, return specialist (No. 21, 28, 26, 19)
- High school: Union County (Lake Butler)
- College: Clemson (2006–2009)
- NFL draft: 2010: 1st round, 9th overall pick

Career history

Playing
- Buffalo Bills (2010–2014); New Orleans Saints (2015–2016); Seattle Seahawks (2016); New York Jets (2016); Kansas City Chiefs (2017)

Coaching
- Clemson (2020) Graduate intern; Clemson (2021–present) Running backs coach

Awards and highlights
- Pro Bowl (2012); ACC Player of the Year (2009); Unanimous All-American (2009); 2× First-team All-ACC (2008, 2009); Second-team All-ACC (2006); Clemson Tigers No. 28 retired

Career NFL statistics
- Rushing yards: 3,451
- Rushing average: 4.8
- Rushing touchdowns: 12
- Receptions: 198
- Receiving yards: 1,484
- Receiving touchdowns: 9
- Return yards: 2,056
- Return touchdowns: 2
- Stats at Pro Football Reference
- College Football Hall of Fame

Clifford "C. J." Spiller Jr. (born August 5, 1987) is an American football coach and former running back and return specialist who is currently the running backs coach at Clemson University. He previously served as a graduate intern at Clemson in 2020.

Spiller played college football for the Clemson Tigers and was recognized as a unanimous All-American. Spiller was drafted by the Buffalo Bills with the ninth overall pick in the 2010 NFL draft and played in the National Football League (NFL) for 9 seasons with the Bills, the New Orleans Saints, the Seattle Seahawks, the New York Jets and the Kansas City Chiefs.

== Early life ==
Spiller was born in Lake Butler, Florida. He attended Union County High School in Lake Butler, where he played football. At Union County High School, Spiller played along fellow Clemson teammate, Kevin Alexander. During his senior year at Union County, he rushed for 1,840–yards on 176 carries for 30 touchdowns. He also had fifteen receptions for 249 yards.

In 2006, he was named All-First Coast boys track and field athlete of the year by The Florida Times-Union after winning FHSAA Class 2A state titles in the 100 and 200 meters.

In his high school career, Spiller rushed for 5,511 yards on 541 carries.

== College career ==
Spiller received an athletic scholarship to attend Clemson University, where he played for the Clemson Tigers football team from 2006 to 2009.

=== Freshman year ===
In his true freshman season, Spiller rushed for 938 yards and ten touchdowns on 129 rushes, despite being the second-team running back behind James Davis. He scored his first collegiate touchdown in a 34–33 overtime loss to Boston College on an 82-yard touchdown reception from quarterback Will Proctor. After struggling versus Florida State the following week, Spiller turned it around against North Carolina by rushing for fifty-eight yards and two touchdowns in a 52–7 rout of the Tar Heels. In the following weeks, Spiller had two triple-digit rushing games as the Tigers defeated Louisiana Tech and Wake Forest. Against Louisiana Tech, he rushed for 127–yards and two touchdowns on eleven attempts, in a 51–0 rout of the Bulldogs, in which the entire Clemson team rushed for 393 yards. In a Gameday-featured game vs. 13th ranked Georgia Tech, Spiller rushed for 116 yards, including a 50-yard touchdown run, as well as catching a 50-yard swing pass touchdown en route to the Tigers 31–7 win. Clemson finished the season with an 8–5 overall record, losing four of their final five games, including a 31–28 loss to archrival South Carolina, and ended the season in a 28–20 Music City Bowl loss to the Kentucky Wildcats. Spiller rushed for only twenty-four yards on five attempts in the loss.

=== Sophomore year ===
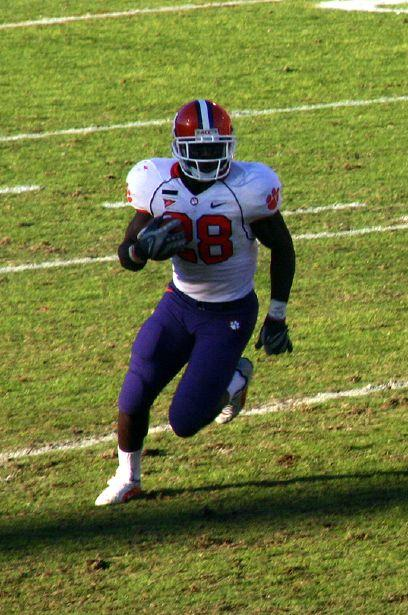
Spiller with the Clemson Tigers in 2007

In his second season for the Tigers, Spiller had a less productive rushing season with only 768 yards and three touchdowns. He did, however, gain more receiving yards, with 271–yards and two additional touchdowns. In the opening three games of the season, Spiller rushed for only eighty-five yards, including a career-worst −1–yards in a 38–10 victory over Furman. In a 13–3 loss, he was again stopped by the Georgia Tech defense, rushing for only two yards. His best statistical game came against rivals South Carolina, which Clemson won 23–21. Spiller ran for a team-high 122 yards on twenty-three attempts in the victory. In the team's bowl game, he rushed for 112–yards on eight attempts, including one touchdown, in a 23–20 loss to Auburn in the Chick-fil-A Bowl.

=== Junior year ===
With Spiller and fellow running back James Davis, the Clemson Tigers were favored to win the opening game of their 2008 season against the Alabama Crimson Tide in the Chick-fil-A College Kickoff. However, a stingy Alabama defense held Spiller to just seven yards on two attempts. He did score though, on a kickoff return for a touchdown. In his second game, however, he rushed for seventy-five yards on six carries, which included three touchdowns in a 45–17 victory over The Citadel. Against Virginia later that year, Spiller threw his first career touchdown on a trick play. Spiller finished the 2008 season with 116 carries for 629 rushing yards and seven rushing touchdowns to go along with 34 receptions for 436 receiving yards and three receiving touchdowns.

On January 15, 2009, Spiller announced that he would remain for his senior year at Clemson instead of entering the 2009 NFL Draft.

=== Senior year ===
In the Tigers' 40–24 victory over the Florida State Seminoles on November 7, 2009, Spiller and Jacoby Ford became the leading all-purpose duo in NCAA history (a record previously held by Marshall Faulk and Darnay Scott of San Diego State).

On November 28, 2009, Spiller set the FBS record for kickoff return touchdowns with seven during his career. He also earned his spot in the record books in another way on that kickoff return, by being one of five players to ever gain 7,000 all-purpose yards. Spiller was one of the three finalists for the 2009 Doak Walker Award, and placed sixth in the voting for the Heisman Trophy.

Spiller was selected for the All-Atlantic Coast Conference (ACC) first-team, and was voted the ACC Player of the Year by the members of the Atlantic Coast Sports Media Association. He was also recognized as a unanimous All-American. He was the nation's only player that season to account for touchdowns five different ways—rushing, passing, receiving, and on kick and punt returns—and had passing, rushing and receiving touchdowns in one game, a victory against North Carolina State, a first for a player in Clemson history. He returned four kickoffs and a punt for scores that year and had eight total returns for touchdowns during his career. He scored at least once in every game that season while leading Clemson to the Atlantic Division title and a spot in the league title game against Georgia Tech, where he ran for 233 yards and four touchdowns. He finished the season with 216 carries for 1,212 rushing yards and 12 rushing touchdowns to go along with 36 receptions for 503 receiving yards and four receiving touchdowns. He went over 100 scrimmage yards in eight of the games. Spiller led the ACC with an average of nearly 184 all-purpose yards and was the league's fourth-leading rusher, averaging 76 yards.

Spiller graduated from Clemson in December 2009, becoming the first person in his family to receive a four-year college degree. Also, Clemson retired his No. 28 in recognition of his college career.

Spiller was the only player in the FBS to score a touchdown in every game in the 2009 season.

== Professional career ==
=== Pre-draft ===
Despite being projected as a first-round pick in the 2009 NFL draft, Spiller decided to return for his senior season in January 2009. He was projected as a first-round draft choice in the 2010 NFL draft and was listed as the No. 1 running back of the 2010 class by ESPN.

External videos
- Spiller's NFL Combine workout

Pre-draft measurables
| Height | Weight | Arm length | Hand span | 40-yard dash | 10-yard split | 20-yard split | Vertical jump | Broad jump | Bench press | Wonderlic |
|---|---|---|---|---|---|---|---|---|---|---|
| 5 ft 10 5/8 in (1.79 m) | 196 lb (89 kg) | 30 1/2 in (0.77 m) | 10 1/8 in (0.26 m) | 4.37 s | 1.55 s | 2.57 s | 36 in (0.91 m) | 10 ft 6 in (3.20 m) | 18 reps | 10 |
All values are from NFL Combine, except vertical and broad jump from Pro Day

=== Buffalo Bills ===
==== 2010 season ====
Spiller was selected in the first round with the ninth overall pick in the 2010 NFL Draft by the Buffalo Bills. He was the highest drafted Clemson player since Banks McFadden (1940 NFL draft) and Gaines Adams (2007 NFL draft), both of whom went fourth overall. On August 6, 2010, Spiller signed a five-year $25 million deal ($20.8M guaranteed).

Spiller was named the top running back on Buffalo's final depth chart, ahead of the recently injured Marshawn Lynch and Fred Jackson. Lynch was later traded to the Seattle Seahawks.

On September 12, 2010, Spiller played in his first career NFL game in a home loss against the Miami Dolphins and had seven carries for six yards.

Spiller was named AFC Special Teams Player of the Week for September 26, 2010, for a 95-yard touchdown return against the New England Patriots. Spiller had a touchdown off a pass by Ryan Fitzpatrick. However, his rookie season was marked with disappointment as he scored no rushing touchdowns and accumulated fewer yards than running backs taken after him in the draft, including Ryan Mathews, Jahvid Best, and Toby Gerhart. For his rookie year in 2010, Spiller produced 283 rushing yards, 157 receiving yards, and 1189 return yards on 56 kickoff and punt return opportunities in 14 games (1 start).

==== 2011 season ====
In 2011, it was announced that Spiller would trade numbers with Leodis McKelvin, receiving the number 28 in exchange for the number 21. Spiller wore number 28 at Clemson. Heading into Week 12, Spiller hadn't gotten as much action as the Bills were planning on because of the Pro Bowl caliber season that Fred Jackson was having, but Jackson was then placed on injured reserve, meaning Spiller would finally get his opportunity and become the Bills' starting running back for the rest of the season. In a Week 16 home game against the Denver Broncos on December 24, 2011, Spiller had the first 100-yard rushing game of his NFL career, rushing 16 times for 111 yards and a touchdown in a 40–14 win for the Bills. Spiller finished the year with 561 yards on 107 carries, with four rushing touchdowns and a 5.2 yards/carry average. He recorded 39 receptions for 269 yards and two receiving touchdowns.

==== 2012 season ====
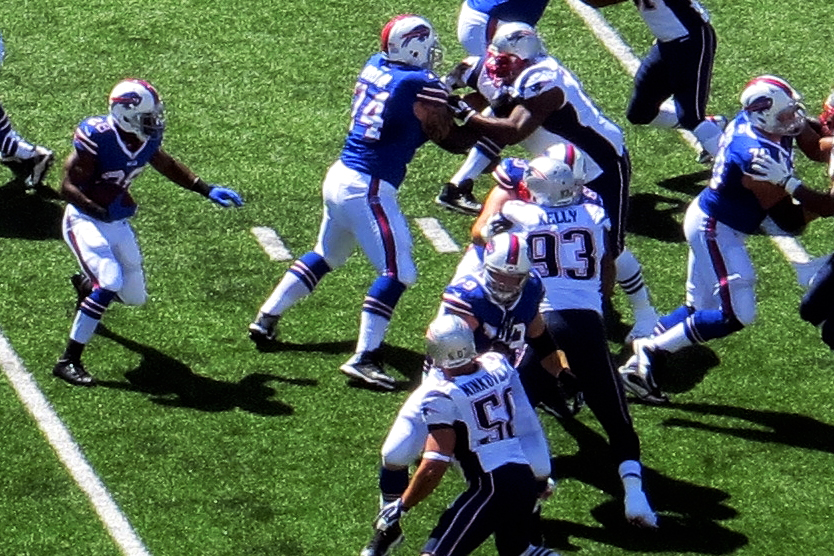
Spiller with the Buffalo Bills in 2013

With Fred Jackson once again missing time due to injuries, Spiller took advantage of the opportunity to have a career year.

In the Bills' 2012 regular season opener against the New York Jets, Spiller had 14 carries for 169 yards and a touchdown. In the following game against the Kansas City Chiefs, he had 15 carries for 123 rushing yards and two rushing touchdowns in the 35–17 victory. In Week 15 against the Seattle Seahawks, Spiller reached the 1,000 yards rushing mark for the first time in his NFL career. He accomplished the feat in 154 carries to reach the mark – the fewest carries to 1,000 yards since Chicago Bears running back Beattie Feathers in 1934. In the following game, against the Miami Dolphins, he had 22 carries for 138 rushing yards.

Spiller rushed for 1,244 yards on only 207 carries and scored six touchdowns; his (6.009) yards per carry average (YPC) was second among running backs to Adrian Peterson's (6.025). He also caught 43 passes for 459 yards with two receiving touchdowns. Spiller was also elected to be in the Pro Bowl as an alternate for Baltimore Ravens running back Ray Rice, who participated in the Super Bowl.

==== 2013 season ====
On August 27, 2013, Spiller took temporary leave from active status with the Bills to be with his family after the murder–suicide by his step-grandfather Hubert Allen Jr.

In Week 13 against the Atlanta Falcons, Spiller had 15 carries for 149 rushing yards and one rushing touchdown. He had three games going over the 100-yard mark on the season. In the 2013 season, Spiller rushed 202 times for 933 yards and had 33 receptions for 185 receiving yards in 15 games (10 starts).

==== 2014 season ====
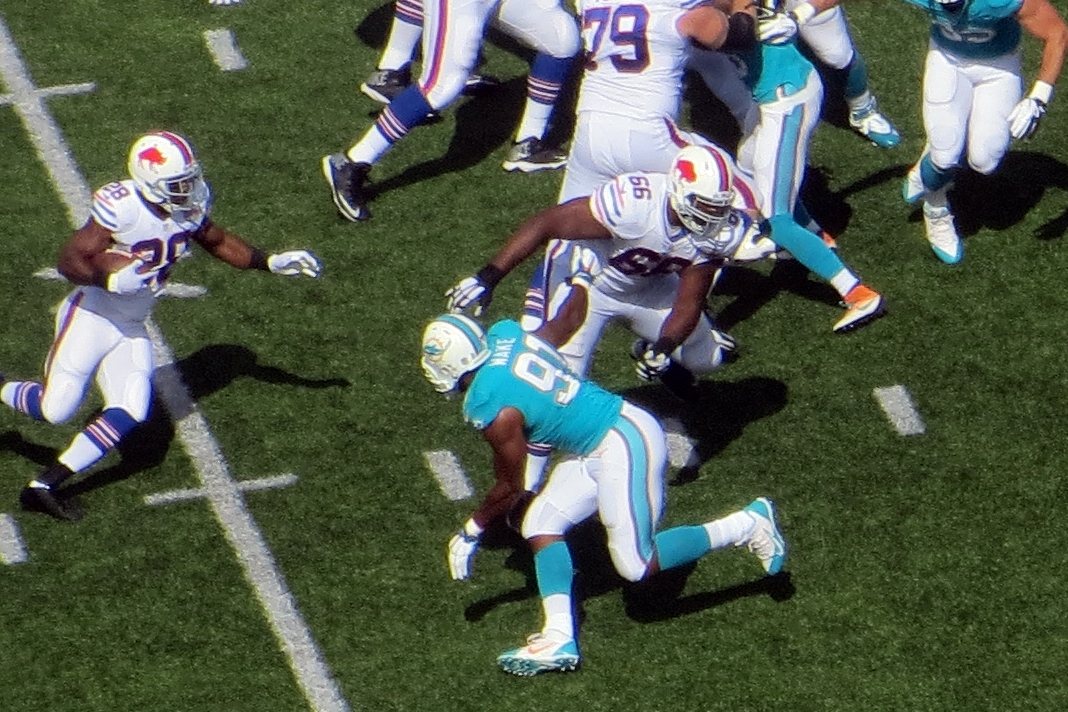
Spiller with the Bills in 2014

In Week 2 against the Miami Dolphins, Spiller returned a kickoff for a touchdown going 102 yards. For his efforts beyond that, Spiller was named the AFC Special Teams Player of the Week. On October 19, Spiller broke his collarbone against the Minnesota Vikings. He was placed on injured reserve/designated to return on October 21, 2014. He returned to action against the Oakland Raiders in Week 16.

The 2014 season was a tumultuous year for the Bills' running backs, aside from Spiller's injury. Fellow running back Fred Jackson was also injured, leaving newly signed backs Anthony Dixon and Bryce Brown as the only healthy running backs for much of the season.

Following the season, Spiller, who was hoping to return to Buffalo after his contract expired, was informed on the set of NFL Network by analyst Willie McGinest that the Bills had traded for LeSean McCoy as the news broke. Bills management called Spiller minutes later, which he described as effectively "thank you for your service."

=== New Orleans Saints ===
On March 13, 2015, Spiller signed a four-year, $18 million contract with the New Orleans Saints. The deal included $9 million guaranteed. In a Week 4 game against the Dallas Cowboys, Spiller caught an 80-yard touchdown pass in overtime to win. It was Saints quarterback Drew Brees' 400th career touchdown pass. In Week 8 against the New York Giants, Spiller caught Brees' seventh touchdown pass of the game.

Spiller was a healthy scratch for their season opener in 2016 against the Oakland Raiders because fellow running backs Travaris Cadet and Daniel Lasco were playing bigger roles, according to coach Sean Payton. On September 13, 2016, Spiller was released.

=== Seattle Seahawks ===
On September 28, 2016, Spiller was signed by the Seattle Seahawks. He was released by the Seahawks on October 26, 2016.

=== New York Jets ===
On November 2, 2016, Spiller signed with the New York Jets. He was released by the team on December 6, 2016.

=== Kansas City Chiefs ===
On February 24, 2017, Spiller signed a one-year $980,000 contract with the Kansas City Chiefs. Throughout the 2017 season, Spiller was subject to multiple transactions causing him to be cut and signed multiple times, most recently being signed for the fifth time on January 2, 2018, the Chiefs ninth transaction in less than a year involving Spiller. He became an unrestricted free agent when the contract expired on March 14, 2018.

== Career statistics ==
=== NFL ===
| Year | Team | Games | | Rushing | | | | | Receiving | | | | | Fumbles | |
| Year | Team | GP | GS | Att | Yds | Avg | Lng | TD | Rec | Yds | Avg | Lng | TD | Fum | Lost |
|---|---|---|---|---|---|---|---|---|---|---|---|---|---|---|---|
| 2010 | BUF | 14 | 1 | 74 | 283 | 3.8 | 20 | 0 | 24 | 157 | 6.5 | 41 | 1 | 5 | 3 |
| 2011 | BUF | 16 | 11 | 107 | 561 | 5.2 | 38 | 4 | 39 | 269 | 6.9 | 19 | 2 | 2 | 0 |
| 2012 | BUF | 16 | 9 | 207 | 1,244 | 6.0 | 62 | 6 | 43 | 459 | 10.7 | 66 | 2 | 3 | 3 |
| 2013 | BUF | 15 | 10 | 202 | 933 | 4.6 | 77 | 2 | 33 | 185 | 5.6 | 27 | 0 | 4 | 1 |
| 2014 | BUF | 9 | 5 | 78 | 300 | 3.8 | 53 | 0 | 19 | 125 | 6.6 | 25 | 1 | 3 | 1 |
| 2015 | NO | 13 | 2 | 36 | 112 | 3.1 | 11 | 0 | 34 | 239 | 7.0 | 80 | 2 | 1 | 0 |
| 2016 | SEA | 2 | 0 | 3 | 9 | 3.0 | 13 | 0 | 5 | 43 | 8.6 | 24 | 1 | 1 | 0 |
| 2016 | NYJ | 4 | 0 | 3 | 9 | 3.0 | 4 | 0 | 1 | 7 | 7.0 | 7 | 0 | 0 | 0 |
| 2017 | KC | 1 | 0 | 2 | 0 | 0 | 1 | 0 | 0 | 0 | 0 | 0 | 0 | 0 | 0 |
| Total | | 90 | 38 | 712 | 3,451 | 4.8 | 77 | 12 | 198 | 1,484 | 7.5 | 80 | 9 | 19 | 8 |

=== College ===
| Season | Team | Rushing | | | | | Receiving | | | | | Returning | | | | |
| Season | Team | Att | Yds | Avg | Lng | TD | Rec | Yds | Avg | Lng | TD | PR | Yds | KR | Yds | TD |
|---|---|---|---|---|---|---|---|---|---|---|---|---|---|---|---|---|
| 2006 | Clemson | 129 | 938 | 7.3 | 80 | 10 | 19 | 210 | 11.1 | 82 | 2 | 11 | 33 | 13 | 324 | 0 |
| 2007 | Clemson | 145 | 768 | 5.3 | 83 | 3 | 34 | 271 | 8.0 | 68 | 2 | 16 | 137 | 19 | 547 | 2 |
| 2008 | Clemson | 116 | 629 | 5.4 | 57 | 7 | 34 | 436 | 12.8 | 83 | 3 | 18 | 189 | 19 | 516 | 1 |
| 2009 | Clemson | 201 | 1,212 | 5.6 | 66 | 12 | 36 | 503 | 14.0 | 63 | 4 | 8 | 210 | 21 | 708 | 5 |
| Total | | 591 | 3,547 | 5.9 | 83 | 32 | 120 | 1,362 | 11.4 | 83 | 11 | 53 | 569 | 72 | 2,005 | 8 |

== Career highlights ==
NFL

- Pro Bowl (2012)

College

- ACC Player of the Year (2009)
- ACC Offensive Player of the Year (2009)
- Unanimous All-American (2009)
- 2× First-team All-ACC (2008, 2009)
- Second-team All-ACC (2006)
- 2009 ACC Championship Game MVP
- Clemson Tigers No. 28 retired
- College Football Hall of Fame (2021)

High school

- First-team Parade magazine All-American (2006)
- High School All-American (USA Today) (2006)
- Selected to play in 2006 U.S. Army All-American Bowl
- #1 player in Florida, #1 all-purpose running back, and #9 overall player by Rivals.com

Track and field

- All-American – Outdoor Track & Field (4 × 100 m) (2007)
- All-ACC Outdoor Track Selection (100m) (2007)
- All-ACC Indoor Track Selection (60m) (2008)
- All-American – Indoor Track & Field (60m) (2008)
- All-American – Outdoor Track & Field (4 × 100 m) (2009)
- All-ACC Outdoor Track Selection (100m) (2009)
- Florida 2A state 100 and 200–meter champion; Florida Times-Union All-First Coast boys track and field athlete of the year.

== Coaching career ==
Following his playing career, Spiller joined the coaching staff at Clemson as an unpaid graduate intern in 2020.

On February 5, 2021, Spiller was promoted to running backs coach at Clemson.
