= Lake Butler Woman's Club =

- U.S. National Register of Historic Places
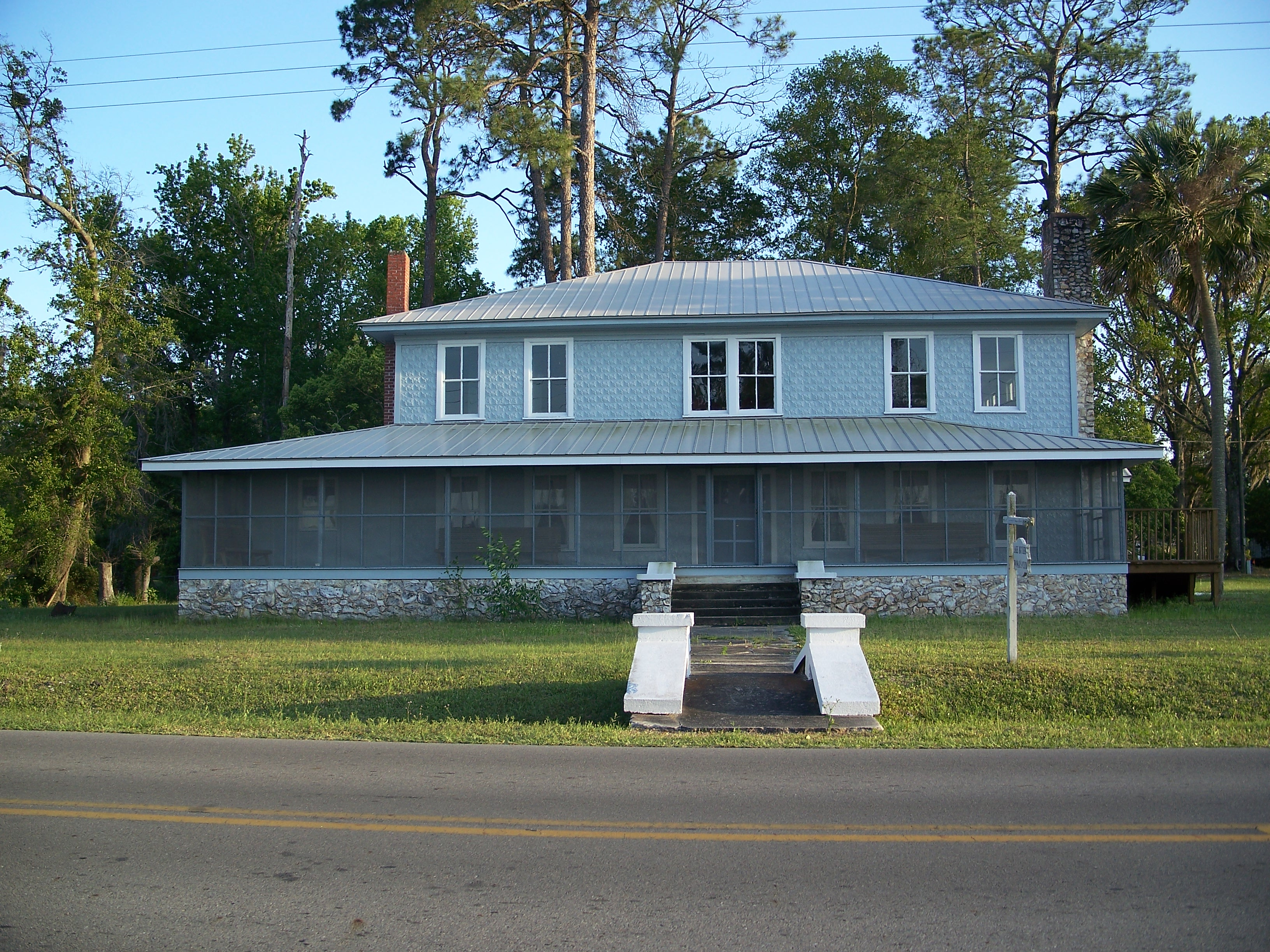
- Lake Butler Woman's Club

- Location within Florida Location within the United States
- Interactive map showing the location of Lake Butler Woman’s Club
- Location: 285 NE First Ave., Lake Butler, Florida
- Coordinates: 30°1′31″N 82°20′14″W
- Area: less than one acre
- Built: 1953
- MPS: Clubhouses of Florida's Woman's Clubs MPS
- NRHP reference No.: 03001309
- Added to NRHP: December 23, 2003

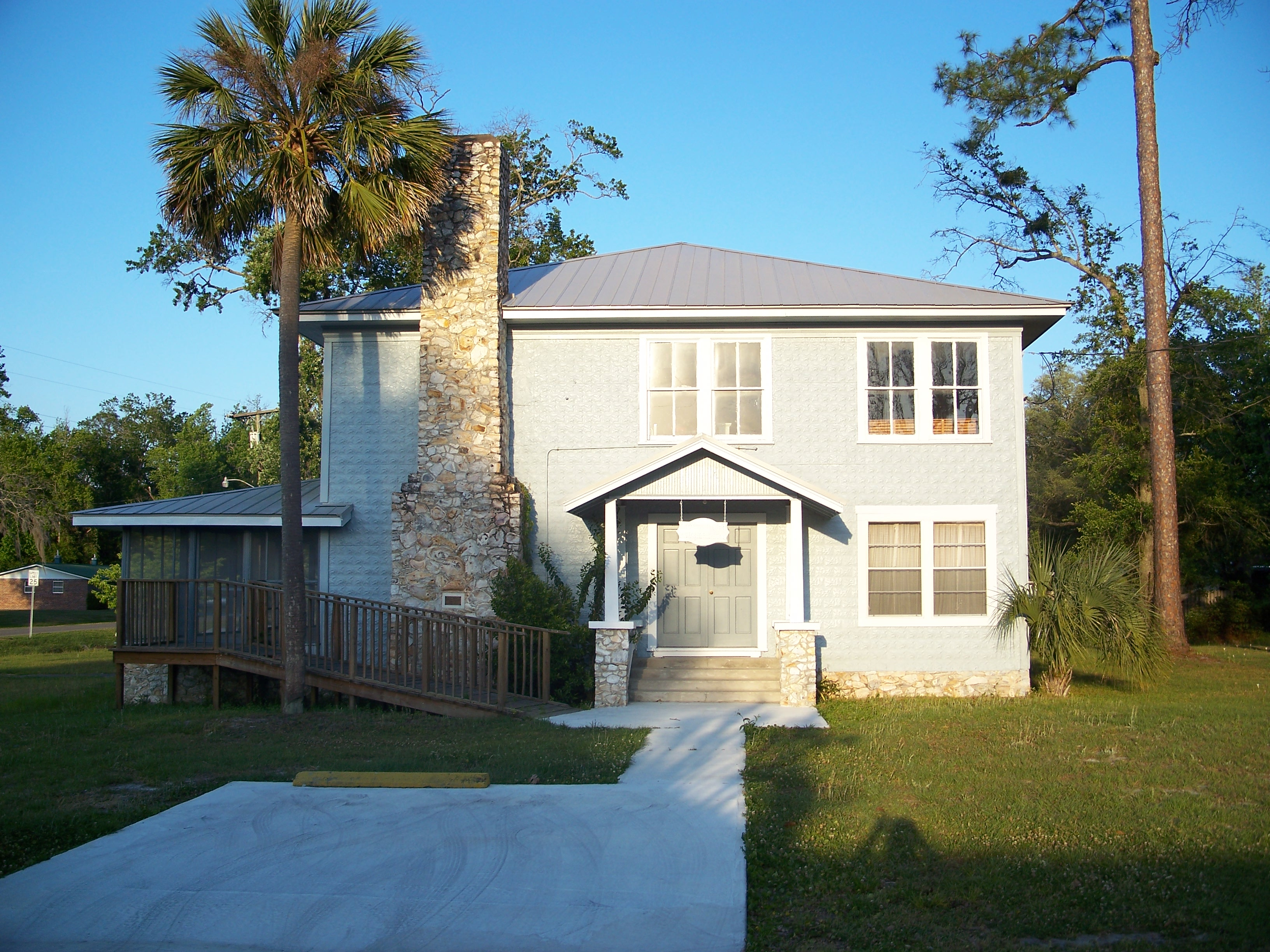
Another view

The Lake Butler Woman's Club, also known as the Old Union County Courthouse, is an historic building now located at 285 NE First Avenue in Lake Butler, Union County, Florida. It was built in 1923 on the site of the present Union County Courthouse. This replaced two previous courthouses which had served Bradford County, from which Union County had been separated in 1921. When the new courthouse was built in 1936, this building was moved to its present site and given to the Woman's Club.

In 1989, the Lake Butler Woman's Club was listed in A Guide to Florida's Historic Architecture, published by the University of Florida Press.

On December 23, 2003, it was added to the National Register of Historic Places.
