= D. J. Humphries (wide receiver) =

American football player (born 1978)

Profile
- Position: Wide receiver

Personal information
- Born: December 19, 1978 (age 47); Union, South Carolina, U.S.
- Listed height: 6 ft 5 in (1.96 m)
- Listed weight: 220 lb (100 kg)

Career information
- High school: Union (SC) Co.
- College: Presbyterian (SC)
- NFL draft: 2002: undrafted

Career history
- Baltimore Ravens (2002)*; Carolina Cobras (2003–2004); Columbus Destroyers (2005)
- * Offseason or practice squad member only
- Stats at ArenaFan.com

Dierrias Jamar Humphries Sr. (born December 19, 1978) is an American former professional football wide receiver. Undrafted in 2002, Humphries was signed on by the Baltimore Ravens as an undrafted free agent, spending the 2002 NFL season on their roster. He then went on to play for the Arena Football League (AFL)'s Carolina Cobras.

A native of Union, South Carolina, Humphries was a letterman in football and basketball at Union County High School. He then played both sports at Presbyterian College.

At age 15, he had a son named after himself, D. J. Humphries, who is currently an offensive tackle for the San Francisco 49ers.
