= D. J. Humphries =

American football player (born 1993)

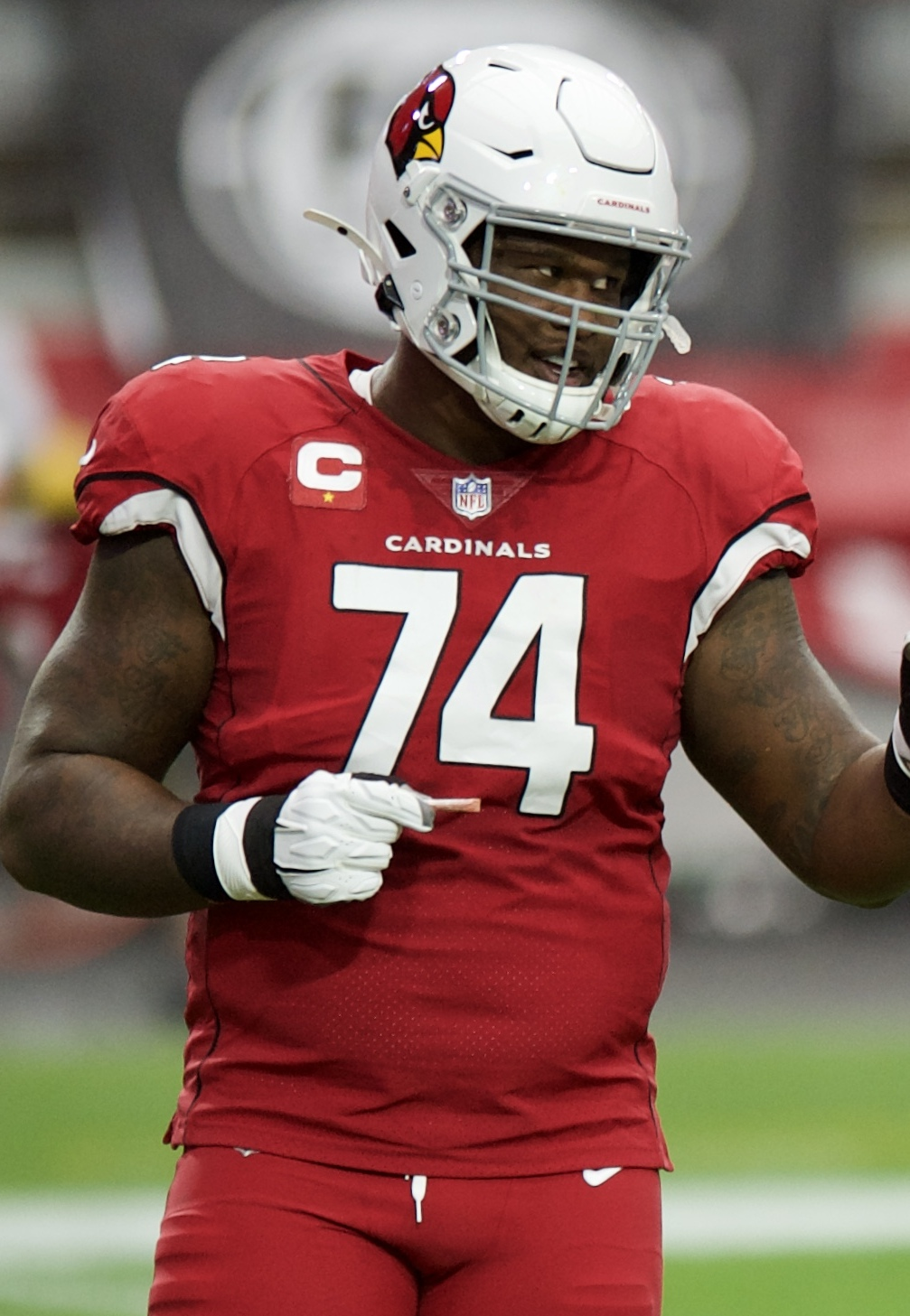
- Humphries with the Arizona Cardinals in 2020

Profile
- Position: Offensive tackle

Personal information
- Born: December 28, 1993 (age 32); Union, South Carolina, U.S.
- Listed height: 6 ft 5 in (1.96 m)
- Listed weight: 307 lb (139 kg)

Career information
- High school: Mallard Creek (Charlotte, North Carolina)
- College: Florida (2012–2014)
- NFL draft: 2015: 1st round, 24th overall pick

Career history
- Arizona Cardinals (2015–2023); Kansas City Chiefs (2024); Los Angeles Rams (2025); Washington Commanders (2026)*
- * Offseason or practice squad member only

Awards and highlights
- Pro Bowl (2021); Freshman All-American (2012)

Career NFL statistics as of 2025
- Games played: 108
- Games started: 101
- Stats at Pro Football Reference

Dierrias Jamar Humphries Jr. (born December 28, 1993) is an American professional football offensive tackle. Humphries played college football for the Florida Gators and was selected in the first round of the 2015 NFL draft by the Arizona Cardinals. He spent nine seasons with Arizona and has also played for the Kansas City Chiefs, Los Angeles Rams, and Washington Commanders.

== Early life ==
A native of Charlotte, North Carolina, Humphries attended Mallard Creek High School, where he was a three-sport athlete in football, basketball, and Track & Field. He was an All-American offensive lineman, clearing the way for 2,000-yard rusher Jela Duncan, and helping protect quarterback Marquise Williams. Humphries started from his freshman season and did not allow a sack over the final three years of his prep career. In 2011, Humphries helped Mallard Creek to a 13–1 record and berth in the NCHSAA Class 4AA State Semifinals, where they were upset 41–27 by Greensboro (NC) Page. In track & field, Humphries competed in the shot put (top-throw of 48 ft 9 in, or 15.25 m) and the discus (105 ft 3 in, or 32.15 m).

Regarded as a five-star recruit by Rivals.com, Humphries was ranked as the No. 1 offensive tackle prospect of his class, ahead of No. 2 prospect Zach Banner. Rivals compared him to D'Brickashaw Ferguson. Recruited by virtually every Division I program in the country, Humphries chose Florida over offers from Alabama, Georgia, and North Carolina, among others.

== College career ==
Humphries enrolled at the University of Florida in January 2012 to participate in spring practice. As a true freshman, he appeared in all 12 games, starting three (South Carolina, Missouri, and Louisiana–Lafayette). He graded out at 80 percent or better six times, including 100 percent against Texas A&M and Tennessee. Humphries was named First-team Offense Southeastern Conference Coaches' All-Freshman (OL) and Sporting News Freshman All-American. He played the first seven games of his sophomore season in 2013, before suffering a season-ending injury. As a junior in 2014, he played in 10 games, missing two due to injury.

== Professional career ==
Pre-draft measurables
Height	Weight	Arm length	Hand span	Wingspan	40-yard dash	10-yard split	20-yard split	20-yard shuttle	Three-cone drill	Vertical jump	Broad jump	Bench press
6 ft 5 in (1.96 m)	307 lb (139 kg)	33 5/8 in (0.85 m)	10 in (0.25 m)	6 ft 10 1/4 in (2.09 m)	5.12 s	1.84 s	3.02 s	4.64 s	7.87 s	31 in (0.79 m)	8 ft 8 in (2.64 m)	26 reps
All values from NFL Combine

=== Arizona Cardinals ===
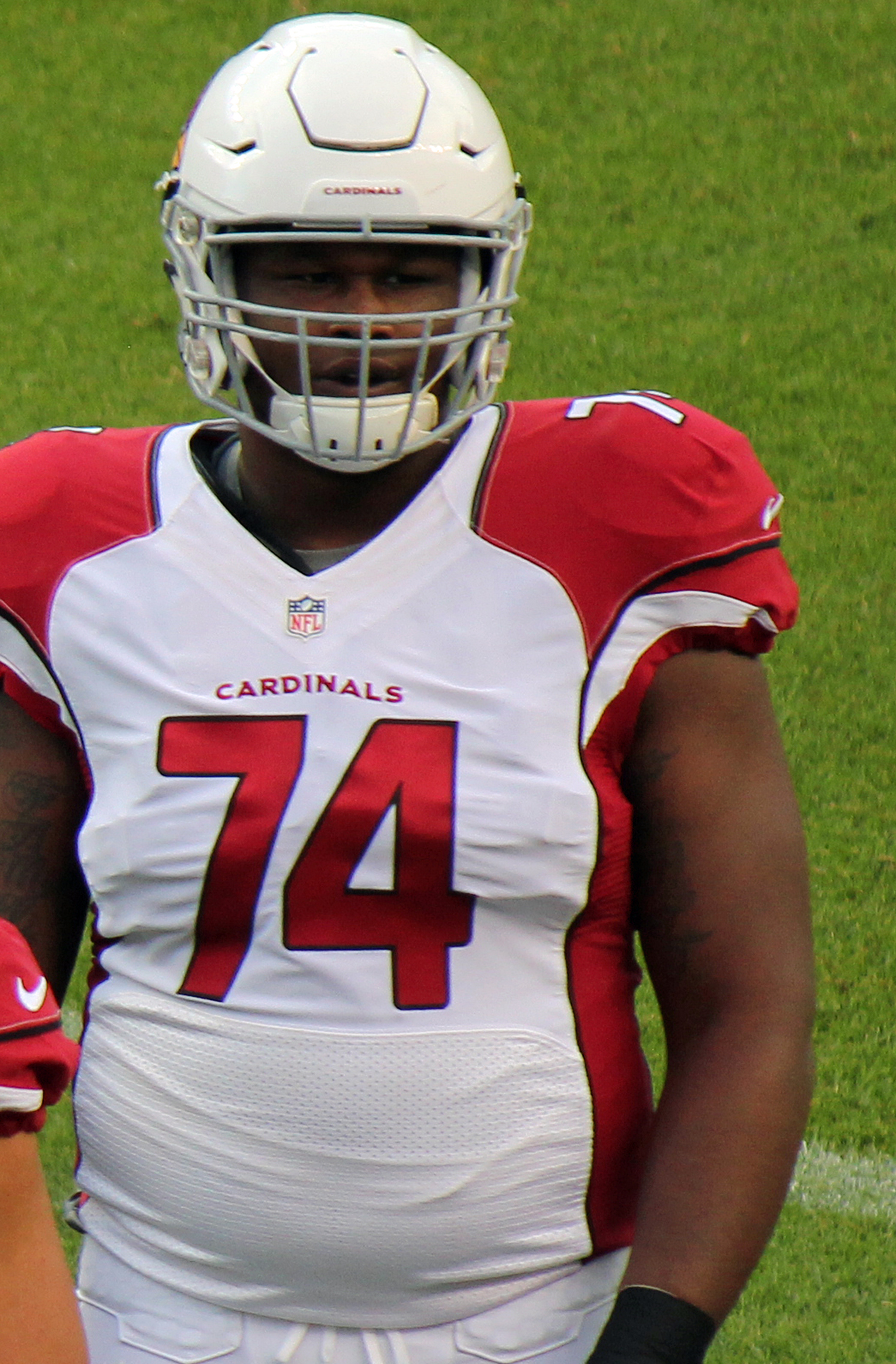
Humphries as a rookie with the Arizona Cardinals, 2015

After his junior season, Humphries entered the 2015 NFL draft and was selected with the 24th overall pick by the Arizona Cardinals. He was the highest selected Florida offensive lineman since Mike Pouncey in 2011.

On June 1, 2015, the Cardinals signed Humphries to a four-year, $8.91 million rookie contract with $7.26 million guaranteed and a signing bonus of $4.74 million.

Throughout his rookie training camp and in the preseason, Humphries displayed uneven play in practice and preseason. Head coach Bruce Arians nicknamed him "knee-deep", explaining that you need to keep "A knee in his ass every day" to keep him motivated.

He started his rookie season as the Cardinals' third right tackle on their depth chart, behind veterans Earl Watford and Bobby Massie. During his rookie season, he was inactive for all 16 regular season games and both postseason contests. He was the only first round draft pick in 2015 to be inactive the entire season.

To begin his second season with the Cardinals, Humphries was named the starting right tackle to begin the regular season. He had his professional debut and first career start in the Cardinals' season opening 23–21 loss to the New England Patriots. On November 27, 2016, he made his first career start at left tackle in a 38–19 loss to the Atlanta Falcons. Starting left tackle Jared Veldheer suffered a torn triceps a few games prior and Humphries replaced the struggling John Wetzel who was in place of Veldheer. On December 11, 2016, Humphries suffered a concussion during the first half of a Week 14 23-26 loss to the Miami Dolphins.

Humphries entered the 2017 season as the Cardinals' starting left tackle. He suffered an MCL sprain in Week 1 and missed the next four games. He returned in Week 6 and started the next four games at left tackle. However in Week 10 on Thursday Night Football, Humphries left the game with a knee injury. He was later diagnosed with a dislocated knee cap and an MCL injury and was ruled out for the season.

On April 24, 2018, the Cardinals picked up the fifth-year option on Humphries' contract. He started the first nine games at left tackle before suffering a knee injury in Week 10. He missed the next three games before being placed on injured reserve on December 5, 2018.

On February 17, 2020, Humphries signed a three-year, $45 million contract extension with the Cardinals through the 2022 season.

On August 2, 2022, Humphries signed a three-year, $66.6 million contract extension with the Cardinals through the 2025 season.

On November 26, 2022, Humphries was placed on injured reserve with a back injury.

December 31st, 2023 Humphries tore his ACL in a victory over the Philadelphia Eagles. He would be placed on injured reserve later in the week.

On March 13, 2024, Humphries was released by the Cardinals after nine seasons.

=== Kansas City Chiefs ===
On November 25, 2024, Humphries signed with the Kansas City Chiefs. During the regular season, he started at left tackle in Week 14 against the Los Angeles Chargers and in Week 18 versus the Denver Broncos and in the playoffs played special teams in the divisional round and the AFC Championship Game and was active but did not play in Super Bowl LIX.

=== Los Angeles Rams ===
On June 12, 2025, Humphries signed with the Los Angeles Rams, originally having a deal in April with the San Francisco 49ers but the deal fell through. Humphries did not see action until Week 8 in a 35-7 victory over Jacksonville. He played in eight games during the regular season, and started at left tackle in place of Alaric Jackson in a 27-24 loss to Atlanta in Week 17. Humphries also played in a backup role in the Rams' 34-31 victory over Carolina in an NFC Wild Card Game.

=== Washington Commanders ===
On August 26, 2026, Humphries signed a one-year contract with the Washington Commanders. He was released by the Commanders on September 11.

== Personal life ==
His father, also named D. J. Humphries, played college football and basketball at Presbyterian College, as well as in the Arena Football League. He has a son.
