= Townsend Building (Lake Butler, Florida) =

- U.S. National Register of Historic Places
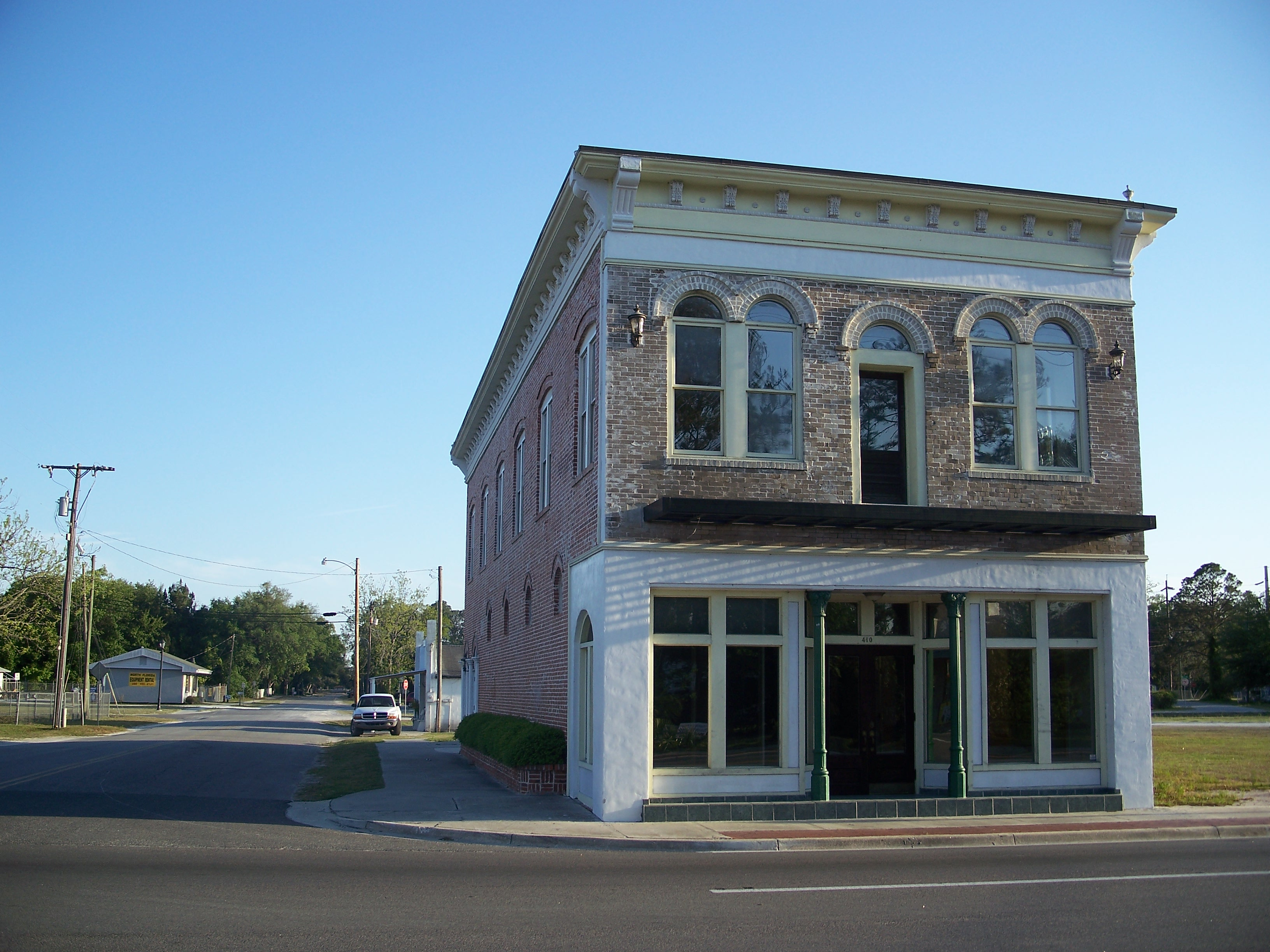

- Location within Florida
- Location: Lake Butler, Florida
- Coordinates: 30°1′21″N 82°20′33″W
- Built: c. 1900
- Architectural style: Italian Renaissance
- NRHP reference No.: 92001359
- Added to NRHP: October 8, 1992

The Townsend Building (also known as the Old Drugstore) is a historic building located at 410 West Main Street in Lake Butler, Florida. Although damaged by fire, it retains significant architectural features which reflect the two-part block commercial design which was popular at the time, and Italian Renaissance Style.

== Description and history ==
It was added to the National Register of Historic Places on October 8, 1992.

== See also ==
- James W. Townsend House, also in Lake Butler
- James W. Townsend House, in Orange Springs
