= Kevin Alexander (linebacker) =

American football player (born 1987)

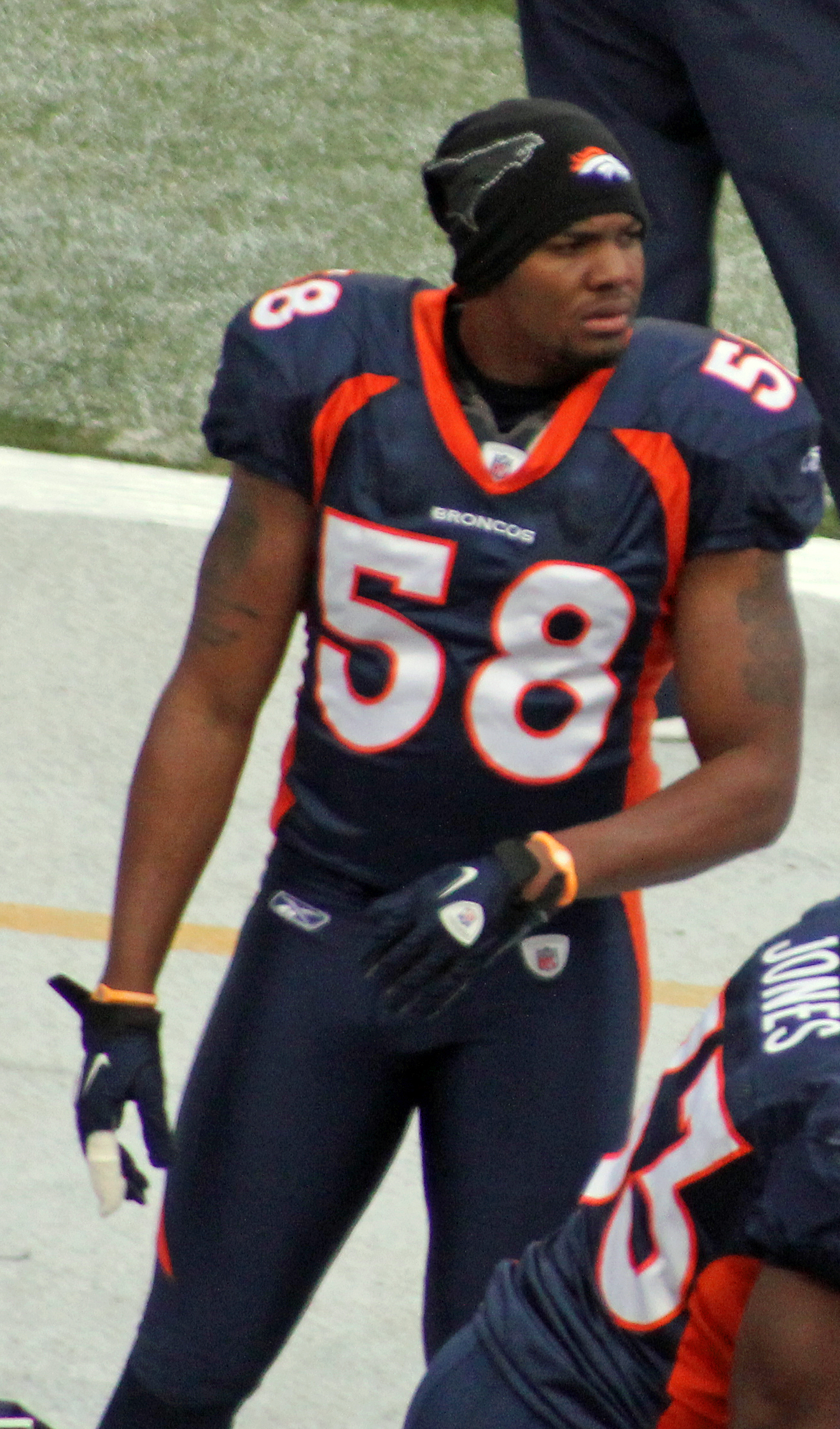
- Alexander with the Denver Broncos in 2010

No. 58
- Position: Linebacker

Personal information
- Born: July 1, 1987 (age 39); Lake Butler, Union County, Florida, U.S.
- Listed height: 6 ft 4 in (1.93 m)
- Listed weight: 265 lb (120 kg)

Career information
- High school: Union County (FL)
- College: Clemson
- NFL draft: 2010: undrafted

Career history
- Denver Broncos (2010)

Career NFL statistics
- Games played: 8
- Total tackles: 4
- Pass deflections: 1
- Stats at Pro Football Reference

Kevin Alexander (born July 1, 1987) is an American former professional football player who was a linebacker in the National Football League (NFL). He was signed by the Denver Broncos as an undrafted free agent in 2010. He played college football for the Clemson Tigers.

== Early life ==
Alexander attended Union County High School in Lake Butler, Florida. He made 282 tackles, 19 sacks and three interceptions in his high school football career, with 115 tackles and nine sacks as a senior.

He committed to Clemson University, and had scholarship offers from the University of Louisville, the University of Maryland, Auburn University, and the University of Tennessee.

== College career ==
Alexander was moved from linebacker to Clemson's bandit end position in the 2007 preseason. He was later moved back to outside linebacker.

== Professional career ==
Alexander was signed by the Denver Broncos as an undrafted free agent following the 2010 NFL draft on April 26, 2010. He was waived during final cuts on September 5, 2010, but was re-signed to the team's practice squad on September 6. He was promoted to the active roster on October 16. He made his NFL debut on October 17 against the New York Jets in week 6. Alexander played in eight games in 2010 before he was waived on December 20 to make room for cornerback Chevis Jackson.

== Personal ==
Alexander's brother, Bennie, played cornerback for the Florida Gators.

Alexander was arrested on December 20, 2010, hours before he was waived by the Broncos, on domestic violence charges. He allegedly assaulted his girlfriend the night before. A court date was scheduled for December 22.
