= James W. Townsend House =

There are two James W. Townsend Houses, both in Florida:

- James W. Townsend House (Lake Butler, Florida), listed on the NRHP in Florida
- James W. Townsend House (Orange Springs, Florida), listed on the NRHP in Florida
