= 1940 United States presidential election in Florida =

- November 5, 1940

Nominee	Franklin D. Roosevelt	Wendell Willkie
Party	Democratic	Republican
Home state	New York	New York
Running mate	Henry A. Wallace	Charles McNary
Electoral vote	7	0
Popular vote	359,334	126,158
Percentage	73.99%	25.98%
County results
Roosevelt
50–60%
60–70%
70–80%
80–90%
90–100%
President before election
Franklin D. Roosevelt
Democratic
Elected President
Franklin D. Roosevelt
Democratic

The 1940 United States presidential election in Florida was held on November 5, 1940, as part of the concurrent United States presidential election. Florida voters chose seven electors, or representatives to the Electoral College, who voted for president and vice president.

Florida had been one of the most solid members of the "Solid South" ever since the 1889 poll tax disfranchised almost all blacks and most poor whites. Unlike southern states extending into the Appalachian Mountains or Ozarks, or Texas with its German settlements in the Edwards Plateau, Florida completely lacked upland or German "Forty-Eighter" whites opposed to secession. Thus disfranchisement of blacks left the party moribund – fifty years after disfranchisement, half of all Florida's registered Republicans were still black although a negligible number had ever voted.

Immigration of northerners into the previously undeveloped areas of South Florida, along with fierce anti-Catholicism in the northern Piney Woods, did give Herbert Hoover a freakish victory in 1928, but apart from that the Democratic Party had lost only six counties at a presidential level since 1892.

Following FDR's second successive sweep of all sixty-seven counties in 1936, Senator Claude Pepper and Miami politicians led a successful push to abolish the poll tax because of the corruption it was causing. Repeal of the poll tax produced significant increases in the total vote cast vis-à-vis that of 1936: the presidential vote increased by around forty-seven percent, and in gubernatorial primaries the absolute increase in percent turnout was over eleven percent of the total voting age white population.

Nonetheless, almost all of this new electorate remained white due to the white primary. Aided by considerable sympathy amongst Florida's largely English-descended white population for the United Kingdom's cause in ongoing World War II, Roosevelt was to sweep every county in Florida for the third successive election and for the ninth occasion in thirteen elections since the recently abolished poll tax was originally imposed. Willkie, who improved by over eight percent upon Alf Landon's performance in 1936, gained less than half that amount in Florida.

As of 2024, this is the penultimate election that every county in Florida voted Democratic and the last time that every county voted more Democratic than the nation at-large.

== Results ==
Electoral results
Presidential candidate	Party	Home state	Popular vote		Electoral vote	Running mate		
Presidential candidate	Party	Home state	Count	Percentage	Electoral vote	Vice-presidential candidate	Home state	Electoral vote
Franklin D. Roosevelt	Democrat	New York	359,334	73.99%	7	Henry A. Wallace	Iowa	7
Wendell Willkie	Republican	New York	126,158	25.98%	0	Charles McNary	Oregon	0
Various candidates (Note: These votes were listed in America at the Polls state-wide, but not in Dave Leip's Atlas.)	Write-ins	—	148 (Note: These write-in votes were listed as a statewide total and not separated by county)	0.03%	0	—	—	0
Total			485,640	100%	7			7
Needed to win					270			270

=== Results by county ===
County	Franklin Delano Roosevelt Democratic		Wendell Lewis Willkie Republican		Margin		Total votes cast
County	#	%	#	%	#	%	Total votes cast
Alachua	6,714	83.03%	1,372	16.97%	5,342	66.06%	8,086
Baker	1,352	92.22%	114	7.78%	1,238	84.44%	1,466
Bay	5,153	88.28%	684	11.72%	4,469	76.56%	5,837
Bradford	1,588	85.88%	261	14.12%	1,327	71.76%	1,849
Brevard	2,995	60.15%	1,984	39.85%	1,011	20.30%	4,979
Broward	6,422	61.69%	3,988	38.31%	2,434	23.38%	10,410
Calhoun	1,722	90.97%	171	9.03%	1,551	81.94%	1,893
Charlotte	910	69.10%	407	30.90%	503	38.20%	1,317
Citrus	1,561	88.95%	194	11.05%	1,367	77.90%	1,755
Clay	1,488	74.92%	498	25.08%	990	49.84%	1,986
Collier	809	83.83%	156	16.17%	653	67.66%	965
Columbia	2,888	86.70%	443	13.30%	2,445	73.40%	3,331
Dade	51,921	67.30%	25,224	32.70%	26,697	34.60%	77,145
De Soto	1,888	78.21%	526	21.79%	1,362	56.42%	2,414
Dixie	1,420	94.41%	84	5.59%	1,336	88.82%	1,504
Duval	41,003	81.71%	9,177	18.29%	31,826	63.42%	50,180
Escambia	16,201	87.81%	2,249	12.19%	13,952	75.62%	18,450
Flagler	553	80.26%	136	19.74%	417	60.52%	689
Franklin	1,400	93.21%	102	6.79%	1,298	86.42%	1,502
Gadsden	3,218	88.53%	417	11.47%	2,801	77.06%	3,635
Gilchrist	1,011	91.99%	88	8.01%	923	83.98%	1,099
Glades	464	72.05%	180	27.95%	284	44.10%	644
Gulf	1,642	93.99%	105	6.01%	1,537	87.98%	1,747
Hamilton	1,424	88.50%	185	11.50%	1,239	77.00%	1,609
Hardee	2,559	78.67%	694	21.33%	1,865	57.34%	3,253
Hendry	1,040	76.64%	317	23.36%	723	53.28%	1,357
Hernando	1,151	75.13%	381	24.87%	770	50.26%	1,532
Highlands	2,215	71.61%	878	28.39%	1,337	43.22%	3,093
Hillsborough	30,738	79.75%	7,805	20.25%	22,933	59.50%	38,543
Holmes	2,684	75.16%	887	24.84%	1,797	50.32%	3,571
Indian River	1,487	62.19%	904	37.81%	583	24.38%	2,391
Jackson	5,607	86.62%	866	13.38%	4,741	73.24%	6,473
Jefferson	1,412	86.79%	215	13.21%	1,197	73.58%	1,627
Lafayette	1,090	89.93%	122	10.07%	968	79.86%	1,212
Lake	5,322	66.68%	2,659	33.32%	2,663	33.36%	7,981
Lee	3,531	68.52%	1,622	31.48%	1,909	37.04%	5,153
Leon	5,459	90.35%	583	9.65%	4,876	80.70%	6,042
Levy	2,527	90.48%	266	9.52%	2,261	80.96%	2,793
Liberty	947	88.84%	119	11.16%	828	77.68%	1,066
Madison	2,421	84.62%	440	15.38%	1,981	69.24%	2,861
Manatee	5,131	72.13%	1,983	27.87%	3,148	44.26%	7,114
Marion	6,127	82.53%	1,297	17.47%	4,830	65.06%	7,424
Martin	1,018	63.07%	596	36.93%	422	26.14%	1,614
Monroe	4,102	89.86%	463	10.14%	3,639	79.72%	4,565
Nassau	1,888	81.77%	421	18.23%	1,467	63.54%	2,309
Okaloosa	3,003	81.32%	690	18.68%	2,313	62.64%	3,693
Okeechobee	822	87.08%	122	12.92%	700	74.16%	944
Orange	12,821	61.00%	8,198	39.00%	4,623	22.00%	21,019
Osceola	2,015	58.52%	1,428	41.48%	587	17.04%	3,443
Palm Beach	11,884	61.72%	7,371	38.28%	4,513	23.44%	19,255
Pasco	3,091	69.41%	1,362	30.59%	1,729	38.82%	4,453
Pinellas	18,941	58.70%	13,327	41.30%	5,614	17.40%	32,268
Polk	17,690	76.07%	5,564	23.93%	12,126	52.14%	23,254
Putnam	3,477	77.53%	1,008	22.47%	2,469	55.06%	4,485
St. John's	4,122	75.98%	1,303	24.02%	2,819	51.96%	5,425
St. Lucie	2,169	69.27%	962	30.73%	1,207	38.54%	3,131
Santa Rosa	2,910	81.60%	656	18.40%	2,254	63.20%	3,566
Sarasota	3,773	69.29%	1,672	30.71%	2,101	38.58%	5,445
Seminole	3,150	69.71%	1,369	30.29%	1,781	39.42%	4,519
Sumter	2,382	90.40%	253	9.60%	2,129	80.80%	2,635
Suwannee	2,866	87.73%	401	12.27%	2,465	75.46%	3,267
Taylor	2,499	92.66%	198	7.34%	2,301	85.32%	2,697
Union	1,024	91.51%	95	8.49%	929	83.02%	1,119
Volusia	10,024	60.63%	6,509	39.37%	3,515	21.26%	16,533
Wakulla	1,336	95.02%	70	4.98%	1,266	90.04%	1,406
Walton	3,217	82.26%	694	17.74%	2,523	64.52%	3,911
Washington	1,915	74.86%	643	25.14%	1,272	49.72%	2,558
Totals	359,334	73.99%	126,158	25.98%	233,176	48.01%	485,640
