= Gerard Warren =

American football player (born 1978)

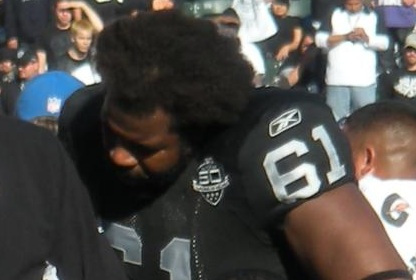
- Warren with Oakland Raiders in 2009

No. 94, 61, 92, 98
- Position: Defensive tackle

Personal information
- Born: July 25, 1978 (age 48); Lake City, Florida, U.S.
- Listed height: 6 ft 4 in (1.93 m)
- Listed weight: 330 lb (150 kg)

Career information
- High school: Union County (FL)
- College: Florida (1997–2000)
- NFL draft: 2001: 1st round, 3rd overall pick

Career history
- Cleveland Browns (2001–2004); Denver Broncos (2005–2006); Oakland Raiders (2007–2009); New England Patriots (2010–2011)

Awards and highlights
- PFWA All-Rookie Team (2001); Second-team All-American (2000); 2× Second-team All-SEC (1999, 2000)

Career NFL statistics
- Total tackles: 339
- Sacks: 36.5
- Forced fumbles: 7
- Fumble recoveries: 5
- Pass deflections: 18
- Stats at Pro Football Reference

Gerard Thurston Warren (born July 25, 1978) is an American former professional football player who was a defensive tackle in the National Football League (NFL) for eleven seasons. He played college football for the University of Florida. He was selected by the Cleveland Browns third overall in the 2001 NFL draft, and also played professionally for the Denver Broncos, Oakland Raiders and New England Patriots of the NFL.

== Early life ==
Warren was born in Lake City, Florida. He attended Union County High School in Lake Butler, Florida, where he played for the Union County Tigers high school football team. He finished his high school career with 36 sacks, and was ranked among the top ten defensive linemen nationally. During his four years in high school, the Union County High School Tigers had an overall win–loss record of 49–4 and won three consecutive Florida Class 3A state championships in 1994, 1995 and 1996. Warren was named to the Prep Stars and USA Today high school All-America teams. In 2007, ten years after he graduated from high school, the Florida High School Athletic Association (FHSAA) recognized Warren as one of the "100 Greatest Players of the First 100 Years" of Florida high school football.

== College career ==
Warren attended the University of Florida in Gainesville, Florida, where he played for coach Steve Spurrier's Florida Gators football team from 1998 to 2000. As a junior team captain in 2000, Warren posted 76 tackles and 4.5 quarterback sacks at defensive tackle and was a second-team All-Southeastern Conference (SEC) selection and a second-team All-American. He finished his three-season career as a Gator with 159 tackles, 9.5 sacks, and 30 tackles for a loss in 35 games and 22 starts.

== Professional career ==
=== Cleveland Browns ===
Warren was drafted by the Cleveland Browns with the third overall selection in the 2001 NFL draft. He played in 15 games as a rookie in 2001, all starts, and finished with 61 tackles and five sacks. In 2002, Warren started all 16 games, recording 40 tackles, two sacks, and two forced fumbles. He started 15 games for the Browns in 2003, picking up 32 tackles and a career-high 5.5 sacks. In his final season in Cleveland, 2004, Warren played in and started 13 games, missing three to injury, and finished with 19 tackles and four sacks.

=== Denver Broncos ===
In March 2005, Warren was traded to the Denver Broncos for a fourth-round pick in the 2005 NFL draft. In addition to Warren, the Broncos also acquired defensive linemen Michael Myers, Ebenezer Ekuban, and Courtney Brown from the Browns, leading some to dub the new Broncos defensive line the "Browncos." Warren finished the 2005 season with 42 tackles and three sacks in 16 starts. In 2006, Warren started 15 games and recorded 30 tackles and 2.5 sacks on the season.

=== Oakland Raiders ===
In August 2007, during the preseason, Warren was traded by the Broncos to the Oakland Raiders in exchange for a conditional fifth-round draft pick in the 2008 NFL draft. In 2007, Warren played in 12 games (five starts) for the Raiders, posting 22 tackles, four sacks, and one forced fumble. Warren started all 16 games in the 2008 season, finishing with 39 tackles, four sacks, and one forced fumble. In his final season with the Raiders, 2009, Warren again started all 16 games and finished the year with 35 tackles and two sacks. He was released by the Raiders on March 11, 2010.

=== New England Patriots ===
On April 24, 2010, during the final day of the 2010 NFL draft, Warren signed with the New England Patriots. Despite being a late free agent signing, Warren made the Patriots' roster and began the season as a starter at defensive end before moving to nose tackle in Week 6. After two games at nose tackle, Warren moved back to defensive end but did not start the team's Week 8 game against the Minnesota Vikings. He returned to the starting lineup in Week 12 against the Detroit Lions on Thanksgiving Day, and went on to start four of the team's final five games after Thanksgiving. Warren finished the regular season with 28 tackles and 3.5 sacks in 16 games (10 starts). The Patriots re-signed him on August 8, 2011, after he had been a free agent for most of the offseason. During the 2011 season, he played in eleven games, all off the bench, and compiled a sack and 15 tackles. Afterward, he again became a free agent, but he re-signed with the Patriots on April 30, 2012. He was again released on August 26, 2012.

== NFL statistics ==
=== Regular season ===
Year	Team	GP	Tackles				Fumbles	
Year	Team	GP	Comb	Solo	Ast	Sack	FF	FR
2001	CLE	15	61	48	13	5.0	0	0
2002	CLE	16	39	29	10	2.0	2	2
2003	CLE	16	32	24	8	5.5	0	2
2004	CLE	13	18	12	6	4.0	2	0
2005	DEN	16	19	14	5	3.0	1	0
2006	DEN	15	30	22	8	2.5	0	0
2007	OAK	12	22	20	2	4.0	1	0
2008	OAK	16	39	31	8	4.0	1	0
2009	OAK	16	35	25	10	2.0	0	0
2010	NE	16	28	17	11	3.5	0	0
2011	NE	12	12	8	4	1.0	0	1
Career		163	335	250	85	36.5	7	5

=== Postseason ===
Year	Team	GP	Tackles				Fumbles	
Year	Team	GP	Comb	Solo	Ast	Sack	FF	FR
2002	CLE	1	2	0	2	0.0	0	0
2005	DEN	2	1	0	1	0.0	0	0
2010	NE	1	1	1	0	0.0	0	0
2011	NE	3	7	3	4	0.0	0	0
Career		7	11	4	7	0.0	0	0

== Personal life ==
Gerard Warren is the second-cousin of Mahailya Reeves, who in 2019, at only 15 years of age, set a Florida women's weightlifting bench press record of 355 pounds.

== See also ==
- 2000 College Football All-America Team
- Florida Gators football, 1990–99
- List of Cleveland Browns first-round draft picks
- List of Florida Gators football All-Americans
- List of Florida Gators in the NFL draft
- List of New England Patriots players
