= Union County School District (Florida) =

School district in Florida, United States

Address
- 55 Southwest 6th Street Lake Butler, Florida, 32054; United States

District information
- Type: Public
- Grades: PreK–12
- NCES District ID: 1201890

Students and staff
- Students: 2,344
- Teachers: 152.17
- Staff: 174.95
- Student–teacher ratio: 15.4

Other information
- Website: www.union.k12.fl.us

The Union County School District is a school district headquartered in Lake Butler, Union County, Florida, United States. Its boundary is that of Union County.

The schools in this district are:

School	Students
Union County High School	606
Lake Butler Middle School	718
Lake Butler Elementary School	908
