= Union County High School (Georgia) =

Secondary school in Blairsville, Georgia, United States

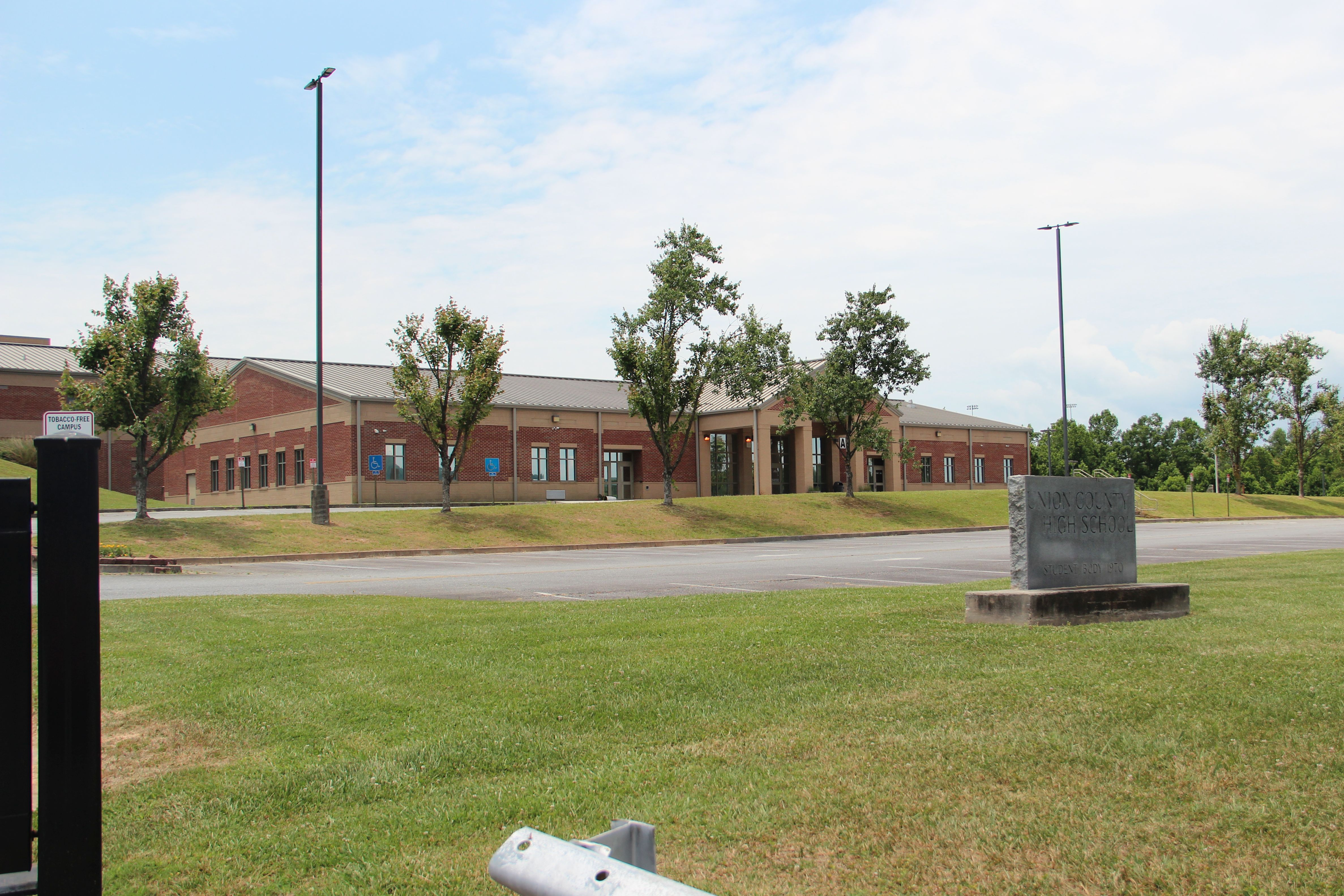

Location
- 604 Panther Way; Blairsville, Georgia 30512; United States; 34.882129°N 83.959923°W

Information
- School district: Union County School District
- Principal: Josh Davis
- Teaching staff: 62.80 (on an FTE basis)
- Grades: 9–12
- Enrollment: 921 (2023–2024)
- Student to teacher ratio: 14.67
- Colors: Purple and Gold
- Athletics conference: 8 AA
- Team name: Panthers
- Rivals: Fannin County High School and Towns County High School
- Accreditation: Southern Association of Colleges and Schools
- Telephone: (706) 745-2216
- Fax: (706) 745-4122
- Website: www.ucschools.org/schools/uc-high-school

Union County High School is a secondary school located in the North Georgia Mountains in Blairsville, Georgia, United States. It is recognized for making an impact in the community and ranking No. 1 in the school district.

The school's mascot is the black panther. Its rivals are Fannin County High School and Towns County High School. The band is called the Pride of the Mountains.

== History ==
Blairsville Collegiate Institute preceded Union County High School.

== The Fine Arts ==
The Union County High School promotes a fine arts program, with the band and chorus earning many awards and the theatre programs putting on many shows with eager participants.

== Athletic achievements ==
Six state championships:

- Larry Turner - track and field
- Jamie Gibson - golf
- Chris Jones - track and field (three times), and cross country
- Zoe Sanchez - cross country (2times)
- 2018 Boys Cross Country team

Eight state runner-up finishes:

- 1971 boys' basketball
- 1990 golf
- 1995 baseball
- 2001 girls' basketball
- 2010 girls' softball
- 2019 Boys’ soccer
- 2019 Boys’ cross country team
- 2025 Boys' basketball

Recent region championships:

- Softball – 2010 and 2011

== Athletic history ==
=== Football ===
The Union County football program has a record of 226–300 since its inception in 1957. The Panthers have won two region championships, in 1973 and 1974. They have made five state playoff appearances, most recently in 2001. In 2001, Union County tied a school record with nine wins, matching win totals from 1983 and 1974.

==== Coaches ====
===== The early years =====
Panther football began in 1957 under Coach Dave Hardin, who won six games in two years before giving way to Bill McGraw. McGraw coached three seasons, going 15–11–4 and leading UC to a seven-win season in 1961, his final season.

Bobby Franks took over for two seasons, going 9–6–1 in 1962 and 1963.

From 1964 to 1968 Bill Thompson was at the helm, leading the Panthers to back-to-back seven-win seasons in 1966 and 1967. Thompson won 26 games during his tenure. Tom Wilson, who also doubled as girls' basketball coach, led the team from 1969 to 1972, but only won seven games during his four seasons. However, Wilson led the girls' basketball squad to four state playoff appearances, including a final-four trip in 1972.

===== Mickey Birchfield =====
Mickey Birchfield replaced Wilson during the 1973–74 season, becoming both football coach and head girls' basketball coach. Birchfield had only one losing season in seven years, winning two Region Titles and setting a school record with nine wins in 1974. During the '74 campaign, the Panthers averaged 30.8 points per game while only allowing six per game, the lowest in school history during a ten-game regular season. The offense also scored 40+ in four consecutive games while shutting out four opponents, East Fannin, Banks County, White County, and Lumpkin County. The Panthers' only loss came against Buford 14–6 on September 27. Birchfield also led the girls' basketball team back to the final four that year. He finished with a 44–25–2 record between 1973 and 1979. His career winning percentage of .611 still marks the highest in school history.

===== Terry Rogers =====
From 1980 to 1993, Union County was led by Terry Rogers, a former All-State player at UCHS in 1965. Rogers' coaching career peaked between 1983 and 1985, winning 25 games and leading the Panthers to state in 1983. The Panther defense shut out five different opponents in 1983. A 10-6 loss at Fannin County on October 7 cost Union a shot at a perfect regular season. Union lost 32–0 vs. Duluth in the playoffs.

After the 1985 season was capped off with a 54–0 rout of Towns County, Rogers won more than four games in a season only once, going 6–4 in 1988. In his final four seasons he only averaged three wins a year, with the low point being a 27–14 defeat at the hands of rival Towns County on September 24, 1993, for the only loss to Towns in school history. Rogers stepped down as the school's all-time wins leader in 1993 with a 56–81–1 overall record, but remained Athletic Director for another 14 years.

===== Chip Kell =====
Former University of Tennessee and three-time All-SEC center Chip Kell took the reins in 1994 with a new emphasis on strength training and conditioning. Kell lasted just two seasons, going 3–17 and allowing 50+ points in three games and getting shut out in four. In 2006, Kell became the 19th Tennessee Volunteer inducted into the College Football Hall of Fame.

===== Brian Allison =====
Brian Allison, an assistant at Furman University, returned to coach his alma mater in 1996. He had had a stellar playing career for the Panthers and Furman during the 1980s. Allison played for four years at Furman and was defensive line coach there for seven years. As a player, his Furman team played in a national championship and lost, and as a coach his team won a national championship in 1988. Allison led the Panthers to a 5-5 record in season one. 1996 was highlighted by wins over White County, North Forsyth, Lumpkin County, Dawson County, and a revenge victory against Towns County. The five wins also marked the most by the Panthers since 1988.

Allison led the Panthers to seven-win seasons in 1998 and 2000 but came up one game short of reaching the playoffs. The 1998 season's playoff hopes were derailed by a 41–27 loss at Commerce. In 2000, UC came up short after falling 35-21 at East Hall in the season finale, where Union lost the services of its leading rusher Zach Helton, due to injury.

The Panthers rebounded in 2001, tying a school record for wins with a 9–2 record and a berth in the state playoffs. UC began the season 9–0 with thrilling victories vs. Appalachee (20–14), at White County (13–7), at Dawson County (32–27), and at Lumpkin County (36–35) in overtime. The Panthers' only regular season loss came at GAC in the season finale, 56–35. The game had been rescheduled from week three due to the 9-11 attacks and set up a matchup of two unbeaten teams playing for the region title. Union County finished second in 8AA and lost in the first round of state at home to Morgan County, 31–28 on a last second field-goal. After the season, Allison left UCHS to take over the same position at Winder-Barrow High School.

===== Kent Green, Stan Luttrell, and Todd Pugh =====
From 2002 to 2007 UCHS had three football coaches, none of whom won more than four games in a single season. Kent Green won five games in 2002 and 2003. Stan Luttrell had 4 wins in 2004 and 2005 and Todd Pugh had three wins in 2006 and 2007.

===== Return of Allison =====
In 2008 Brian Allison returned to UCHS. The Panthers began 2008 with four consecutive wins, including a 49–21 victory over region powerhouse, North Oconee. His team was also named Fox 5 Team of the Week after a 35–14 win at East Jackson in week four. The season went downhill beginning in week 5 with a 50–14 home loss to Jefferson. After a bye week and a three-point win at Oglethorpe County, UC lost 42–35 at rival Fannin County. Then on October 24, an overtime homecoming loss to Dawson County proved especially devastating after quarterback Kolt Owenby broke his wrist during the game and missed the remainder of the season. The Panthers, without Owenby, went on to lose to Banks County and Riverside Military Academy to finish the season at 5–5. Allison's offense averaged 27.2 PPG for the year. Before the injury to Owenby, Union was on pace to score the most points in team history, averaging 32.7 per game. Without Owenby, Union's offensive production dive-bombed to an anemic 15.7 PPG in its final three games.

With a healthy Owneby and All-State wide receiver Blake Gowder, Union finished with a 6–4 record in 2009. However, Union's post-season hopes were dashed after a 28–27 Senior Night loss to Riverside Military Academy on October 30. The Panthers did take some revenge on Banks County the following week with a 48–20 blowout victory to give UCHS their first winning season since 2001. Union County also avenged two rivalry-game losses from the previous season with a 45–14 victory at Dawson County and a 28–24 come-from-behind win over Fannin County. The win over Fannin marked the first win for UC in the rivalry since 2001 and the first over Dawson since 2002. They finished the season averaging 34.3 PPG, a school record.

During the 2008 and 2009 seasons his teams averaged 30.8 PPG. He coached 65 consecutive games at Union County without being shut out until September 17 9, 2010, when Union was shut out by Robbinsville, North Carolina, 34–0.

In 2010, Union County finished with a 4–6 record, highlighted by a 40–7 win over Towns County and a 13–7 win over Dawson County. In the win over Dawson, Union's defense made a goal-line stand from inside the three-yard line in the waning seconds to preserve back-to-back wins over the Tigers. The Panthers lost in the same fashion at Fannin County after the Rebels' defense kept Union out of the end zone on four consecutive plays from inside the five-yard line.

The 2011 campaign started off with a 20–0 shutout of Towns County before Union lost six straight games. Union rebounded with a 10-7 win at Rabun County and a 30–15 dusting of Fannin County. The Panthers lost the final game of the year to Hart County, 28–14, to finish with a 3–7 record.

Allison's 59 wins at UCHS are the most in school history, after he broke the record set by Terry Rogers on September 14, 2012, during a 40–13 win over Andrews, North Carolina.

In 2012, Union County got off to a 5–1 start, the best start since Allison's 2001 squad. Win number five came on Homecoming, giving Union its first Homecoming Game victory since the record-setting 2001 campaign.

=== All-State players ===
Year	Player	Title	College or university
2015	Joseph Mancuso	AJC, AP, GACA	University of Richmond
2014	Joseph Mancuso	AJC, AP, GACA	
2013	Joseph Mancuso	AP, GACA	
2013	Luther Jones	AJC, AP, GACA	Kennesaw State University
2012	Luther Jones	AJC, AP, GACA	
2009	Blake Gowder	AP, GACA, AJC	Vanderbilt University
2008	Blake Gowder	AP, GACA, AJC	
2000	Trent Dyer	AP, AJC	Tusculum College
1984	Mike Kiernan	AJC	Furman University
1983	Brian Allison	AJC	Furman University
1977	Ronnie Owenby	AJC	
1976	Robby Kelley	AJC	
1975	Mickey Jones	AJC	
1974	Phil Kelley	AJC	
1974	Robby Rogers	AJC, Back of the Year	
1967	Bill Jones	AJC	
1966	Bill Jones	AJC	
1965	Bill Jones	AJC	
1965	Lewis McAfee	AJC	
1965	Terry Rogers	AJC	
1964	Gary Hill	AJC	

=== Rivals ===
Union County has a 25–1 record against its original rival, Towns County. Towns' only win came in 1993. Union's most lopsided win came in 1985 by the score of 54–0. Union has scored at least 30 points in thirteen of the 22 meetings and owns thirteen shutout victories in the series.

Union also holds an 18–11 advantage over Dawson County. Union defeated Dawson 46–8 in 1976 and Dawson beat Union 38–0 in 2006 for the two largest margins in the series.

Fannin County holds a 12–8 lead over Union County. However UC held a combined 14–8 advantage over East Fannin and West Fannin until the schools combined to create Fannin County High School in the 1970s. In 2000 Union defeated Fannin 36–0 in the most one-sided game in the series' history. Fannin matched that same margin in 2006 with a 43–7 victory. Union also defeated East Fannin, 40–0, in 1966 and 39–0 in 1974.

In 2009, Union County overcame a 24–7 deficit for a 28–24 victory to avenge a 42–35 loss the year before. The 2008 meeting saw the Fannin County offense rush for more than 490 yards.
