= Union County, Florida =

County in Florida, United States

- County
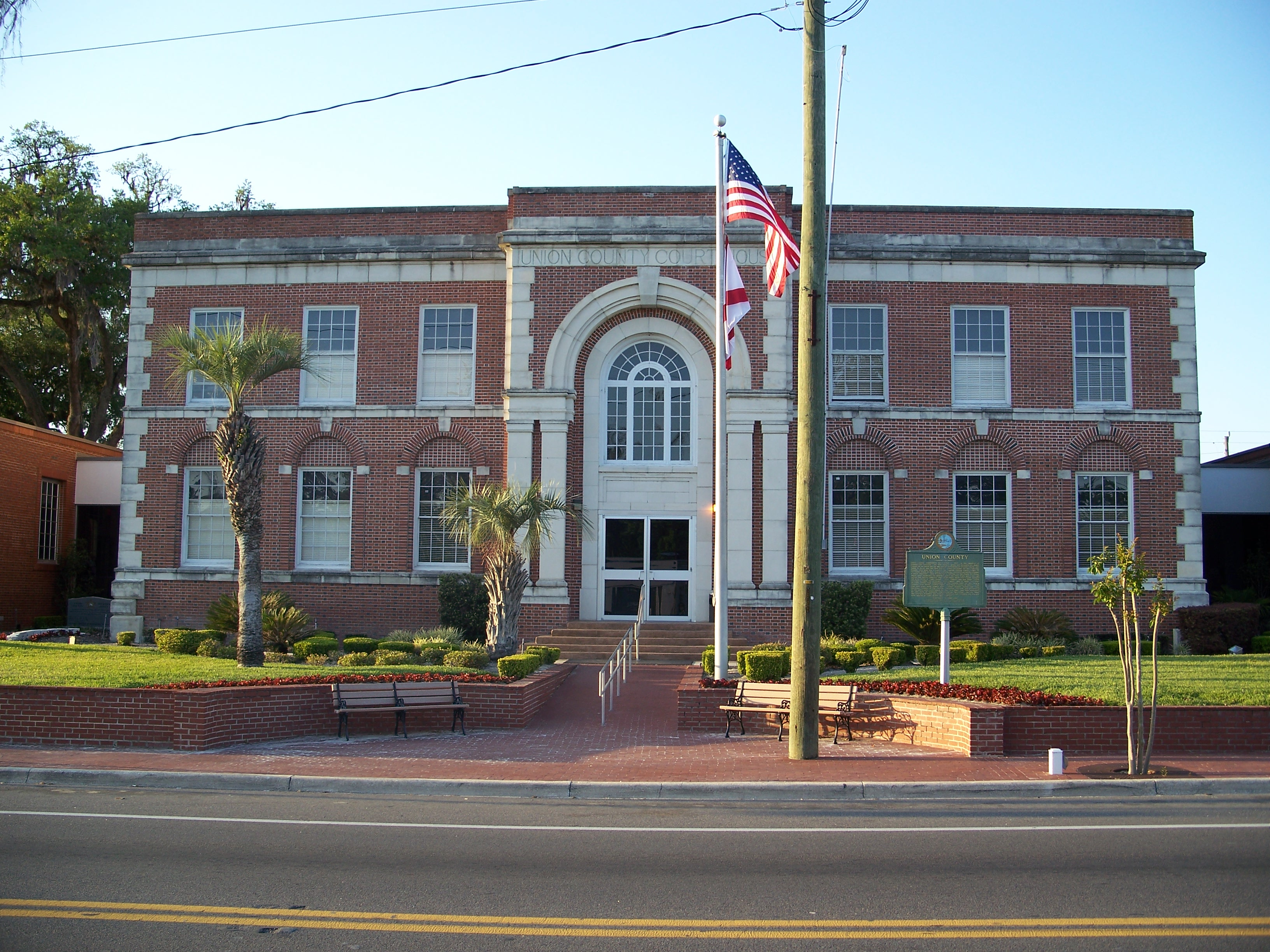
- Union County Courthouse

- Location within the U.S. state of Florida
- Coordinates: 30°02′N 82°22′W
- Country: United States
- State: Florida
- Founded: May 20, 1921
- Named for: Concept of Unity
- Seat: Lake Butler
- Largest city: Lake Butler

Area
  - Total: 250 sq mi (650 km^{2})
  - Land: 244 sq mi (630 km^{2})
  - Water: 6.2 sq mi (16 km^{2}) 2.5%

Population (2020)
  - Total: 16,147
  - Estimate (2025): 16,250 ▲
  - Density: 66.2/sq mi (25.6/km^{2})
- Time zone: UTC−5 (Eastern)
  - Summer (DST): UTC−4 (EDT)
- Congressional district: 3rd
- Website: unioncounty-fl.gov

Union County is a county located in the north central portion of the U.S. state of Florida, the smallest in the state by area. As of the 2020 census, the population was 16,147. The county seat is Lake Butler.

== History ==
Union County was created on October 1, 1921, from part of Bradford County. It was named to honor the concept of unity. Union County is the location of Union Correctional Institution and the Reception and Medical Center (RMC). Union CI is a maximum security prison and is home to part of Florida's Death Row. The death chamber is located at nearby Florida State Prison (FSP) in Bradford County. Florida State Prison also houses some death-row inmates.

== Geography ==
According to the U.S. Census Bureau, the county has an area of 250 square miles (650 km^{2}), of which 244 square miles (630 km^{2}) is land and 6.2 square miles (16 km^{2}) (2.5%) is water. It is the smallest county by area in Florida.

=== Adjacent counties ===
- Baker County (north)
- Alachua County (south)
- Bradford County (east)
- Columbia County (west)

== Demographics ==
Historical population
| Census | Pop. | Note | %± |
|---|---|---|---|
| 1930 | 7,428 | | — |
| 1940 | 7,094 | | −4.5% |
| 1950 | 8,906 | | 25.5% |
| 1960 | 6,043 | | −32.1% |
| 1970 | 8,112 | | 34.2% |
| 1980 | 10,166 | | 25.3% |
| 1990 | 10,252 | | 0.8% |
| 2000 | 13,442 | | 31.1% |
| 2010 | 15,535 | | 15.6% |
| 2020 | 16,147 | | 3.9% |
| 2025 (est.) | 16,250 | ▲ | 0.6% |
U.S. Decennial Census; 1790-1960 1900-1990; 1990-2000 2010-2019

=== Racial and ethnic composition ===
Union County, Florida – Racial and ethnic composition Note: the US Census treats Hispanic/Latino as an ethnic category. This table excludes Latinos from the racial categories and assigns them to a separate category. Hispanics/Latinos may be of any race.
| Race / Ethnicity (NH = Non-Hispanic) | Pop 1980 | Pop 1990 | Pop 2000 | Pop 2010 | Pop 2020 | % 1980 | % 1990 | % 2000 | % 2010 | % 2020 |
|---|---|---|---|---|---|---|---|---|---|---|
| White alone (NH) | 6,890 | 7,499 | 9,659 | 11,123 | 11,585 | 67.77% | 73.15% | 71.86% | 71.60% | 71.75% |
| Black or African American alone (NH) | 2,920 | 2,320 | 3,038 | 3,391 | 3,197 | 28.72% | 22.63% | 22.60% | 21.83% | 19.80% |
| Native American or Alaska Native alone (NH) | 46 | 57 | 84 | 52 | 42 | 0.45% | 0.56% | 0.62% | 0.33% | 0.26% |
| Asian alone (NH) | 38 | 38 | 33 | 32 | 35 | 0.37% | 0.37% | 0.25% | 0.21% | 0.22% |
| Native Hawaiian or Pacific Islander alone (NH) | x | x | 3 | 2 | 0 | x | x | 0.02% | 0.01% | 0.00% |
| Other race alone (NH) | 5 | 3 | 3 | 4 | 62 | 0.05% | 0.03% | 0.02% | 0.03% | 0.38% |
| Mixed race or Multiracial (NH) | x | x | 264 | 188 | 462 | x | x | 1.96% | 1.21% | 2.86% |
| Hispanic or Latino (any race) | 267 | 335 | 477 | 743 | 764 | 2.63% | 3.27% | 3.55% | 4.78% | 4.73% |
| Total | 10,166 | 10,252 | 13,561 | 15,535 | 16,147 | 100.00% | 100.00% | 100.00% | 100.00% | 100.00% |

=== 2020 census ===
As of the 2020 census, the county had a population of 16,147 and a median age of 41.4 years. 18.9% of residents were under the age of 18 and 15.5% of residents were 65 years of age or older. For every 100 females there were 175.9 males, and for every 100 females age 18 and over there were 199.3 males.

There were 4,271 households in the county, of which 37.2% had children under the age of 18 living in them. Of all households, 47.8% were married-couple households, 17.8% were households with a male householder and no spouse or partner present, and 27.3% were households with a female householder and no spouse or partner present. About 23.5% of all households were made up of individuals and 10.3% had someone living alone who was 65 years of age or older. Of those households, 2,873 were families.

There were 4,713 housing units, of which 9.4% were vacant. Among occupied housing units, 70.4% were owner-occupied and 29.6% were renter-occupied. The homeowner vacancy rate was 0.6% and the rental vacancy rate was 7.2%.

The racial makeup of the county was 73.7% White, 20.0% Black or African American, 0.3% American Indian and Alaska Native, 0.2% Asian, <0.1% Native Hawaiian and Pacific Islander, 1.9% from some other race, and 3.8% from two or more races. Hispanic or Latino residents of any race comprised 4.7% of the population.

<0.1% of residents lived in urban areas, while 100.0% lived in rural areas.

=== 2000 census ===
At the 2000 census, there were 13,442 people, 3,367 households and 2,606 families residing in the county. The population density was 56 per square mile (22/km^{2}). There were 3,736 housing units at an average density of 16 per square mile (6/km^{2}). The racial makeup of the county was 73.62% White, 22.84% Black or African American, 0.66% Native American, 0.31% Asian, 0.02% Pacific Islander, 1.04% from other races, and 1.50% from two or more races. 3.55% of the population were Hispanic or Latino of any race.

Of the 3,367 households, 41.80% had children under the age of 18 living with them, 57.70% were married couples living together, 15.00% had a female householder with no husband present, and 22.60% were non-families. 19.50% of all households were made up of individuals, and 7.10% had someone living alone who was 65 years of age or older. The average household size was 2.76 and the average family size was 3.13.

The age distribution was 21.80% under the age of 18, 8.70% from 18 to 24, 39.80% from 25 to 44, 22.20% from 45 to 64, and 7.50% who were 65 years of age or older. The median age was 36 years. For every 100 females there were 183.00 males. For every 100 females age 18 and over, there were 215.20 males. This extremely skewed gender distribution is the result of the county's male prison population.

The median household income was $34,563, and the median family income was $37,516. Males had a median income of $28,571 versus $22,083 for females. The county's per capita income was $12,333. About 10.50% of families and 14.00% of the population were below the poverty line, including 14.60% of those under age 18 and 16.20% of those age 65 or over.

=== Mortality ===
The county suffers a death rate of about 1600 per 100,000 residents, the highest in the nation.

| Cause of Death (2017) | Union County (Adjusted Rate) | Florida (Adjusted Rate) |
|---|---|---|
| Overall | 1,516 | 681 |
| Cancer | 470 | 153 |
| Heart Disease | 298 | 152 |
| Respiratory Infection | 121 | 39 |
| Stroke | 59 | 36 |
| Hepatitis | 54 | 2 |

== Government and infrastructure ==
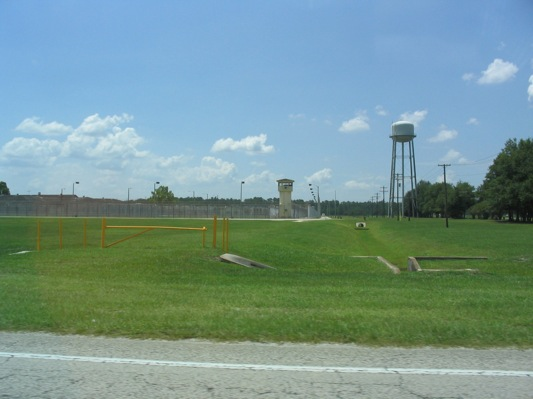
Union Correctional Institution

The Florida Department of Corrections (FDOC) operates Region II Correctional Facility Office in an unincorporated area in Union County. FDOC also maintains the Union Correctional Institution in an unincorporated area in the county. Union Correctional Institution houses one of two death rows for men in Florida. About a third of the county's population is imprisoned, compared to a statewide figure of one-half percent.

The Union Juvenile Residential Facility of the Florida Department of Juvenile Justice is in an unincorporated area in Union County.

United States presidential election results for Union County, Florida
| Year | Republican | | Democratic | | Third party(ies) | |
| Year | No. | % | No. | % | No. | % |
|---|---|---|---|---|---|---|
| 1924 | 16 | 4.60% | 322 | 92.53% | 10 | 2.87% |
| 1928 | 177 | 25.69% | 503 | 73.00% | 9 | 1.31% |
| 1932 | 60 | 6.27% | 897 | 93.73% | 0 | 0.00% |
| 1936 | 89 | 7.56% | 1,089 | 92.44% | 0 | 0.00% |
| 1940 | 95 | 8.49% | 1,024 | 91.51% | 0 | 0.00% |
| 1944 | 102 | 10.13% | 905 | 89.87% | 0 | 0.00% |
| 1948 | 55 | 6.29% | 594 | 67.96% | 225 | 25.74% |
| 1952 | 268 | 21.68% | 968 | 78.32% | 0 | 0.00% |
| 1956 | 218 | 18.54% | 958 | 81.46% | 0 | 0.00% |
| 1960 | 311 | 24.84% | 941 | 75.16% | 0 | 0.00% |
| 1964 | 710 | 48.97% | 740 | 51.03% | 0 | 0.00% |
| 1968 | 179 | 10.78% | 290 | 17.46% | 1,192 | 71.76% |
| 1972 | 1,314 | 83.85% | 253 | 16.15% | 0 | 0.00% |
| 1976 | 544 | 26.67% | 1,480 | 72.55% | 16 | 0.78% |
| 1980 | 1,123 | 46.35% | 1,237 | 51.05% | 63 | 2.60% |
| 1984 | 1,804 | 70.28% | 761 | 29.65% | 2 | 0.08% |
| 1988 | 1,644 | 69.99% | 691 | 29.42% | 14 | 0.60% |
| 1992 | 1,546 | 43.29% | 1,248 | 34.95% | 777 | 21.76% |
| 1996 | 1,636 | 47.26% | 1,388 | 40.09% | 438 | 12.65% |
| 2000 | 2,332 | 60.95% | 1,407 | 36.77% | 87 | 2.27% |
| 2004 | 3,396 | 72.64% | 1,251 | 26.76% | 28 | 0.60% |
| 2008 | 3,940 | 74.20% | 1,300 | 24.48% | 70 | 1.32% |
| 2012 | 3,980 | 73.59% | 1,339 | 24.76% | 89 | 1.65% |
| 2016 | 4,568 | 79.83% | 1,014 | 17.72% | 140 | 2.45% |
| 2020 | 5,133 | 82.11% | 1,053 | 16.85% | 65 | 1.04% |
| 2024 | 5,224 | 83.64% | 971 | 15.55% | 51 | 0.82% |

== Education ==
Union County School District serves the county.

=== Libraries ===
In 1986, local county volunteers ran a make shift library in the local Community Center which consisted of donated books and other items. Soon the County was able to fund their own public library from tax money. An old bank building was renovated and used for the new public library. In 1990, the library was open to the public. In 1996, the Union County Public Library became a part of the New River Public Library Cooperative to enhance and support library services for patrons throughout the county.

The Union County Public Library serves the county. The branch is at 250 SE 5th Avenue, Lake Butler, Florida 32054. Its director is Mary C. Brown. The branch is open Monday, Wednesday–Friday 9 am–6 pm, Tuesday 9 am–8 pm, and Saturday 9 am–3 pm.

== Transportation ==
=== Major roads ===
- SR 16
- SR 18
- SR 100
- SR 121
- SR 231
- SR 238

=== Railroads ===
Union County has had three railroad lines in the past, all of which are abandoned. The primary one is the former Georgia Southern and Florida Railway, which ran along SR 100 from Columbia County through Bradford County. The other line is the Jacksonville and Southwestern Railroad which ran along SR 121 from Columbia County into Baker County. The J&SW also had a junction to the Bradford Farms Railroad, a spur north of Florida State Road 16 leading to what is today the Wildwood Subdivision in Lawtey in Bradford County.

== Communities ==
| # | Incorporated Community | Designation | Population |
|---|---|---|---|
| 1 | Lake Butler | City | 1,813 |
| 2 | Worthington Springs | Town | 390 |
| 3 | Raiford | Town | 242 |
| 4 | Johnstown | Unincorporated | |
| 5 | Rylander | Unincorporated | |

== See also ==
- National Register of Historic Places listings in Union County, Florida
