= Union County School District (Georgia) =

School district in Georgia (U.S. state)

Address
- 124 Hughes Street Blairsville, Georgia, 30512-3551; United States
- Coordinates: 34.924188°N 84.040172°W

District information
- Grades: Pre-kindergarten – 12
- Superintendent: John Hill
- Accreditation(s): Southern Association of Colleges and Schools; Georgia Accrediting Commission

Students and staff
- Enrollment: 3,024 (2022–23)
- Faculty: 220.80 (FTE)
- Staff: 286.40 (FTE)
- Student–teacher ratio: 13.70

Other information
- Telephone: (706) 745-2322
- Fax: (706) 745-8391
- Website: ucschools.org

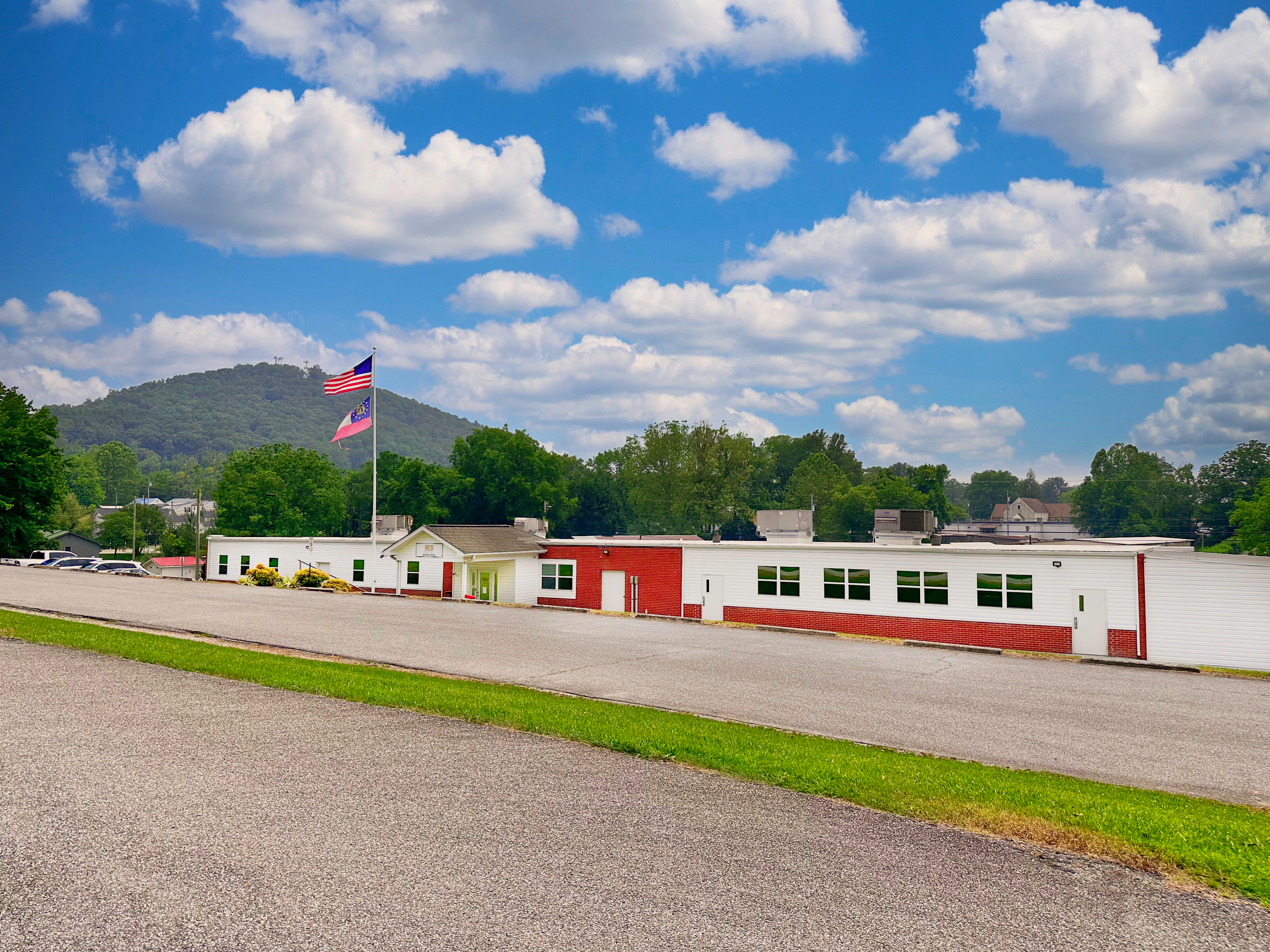
Union County Schools Central Office in 2023

The Union County School District is a public school district in Union County, Georgia, United States, based in Blairsville. It serves the communities of Blairsville and Suches.

As of 2021, the school district's annual budget is $49.59 million, or $17,073 per student.

== Schools ==
The Union County School District has two elementary schools, one middle school, and two high schools.

=== Elementary schools ===
- Union County Elementary School
- Union County Primary School

=== Middle school ===
- Union County Middle School

=== High school ===
- Union County High School
- Woody Gap High/Elementary School
