= James W. Townsend House (Lake Butler, Florida) =

Historic house in Florida, United States

- U.S. National Register of Historic Places
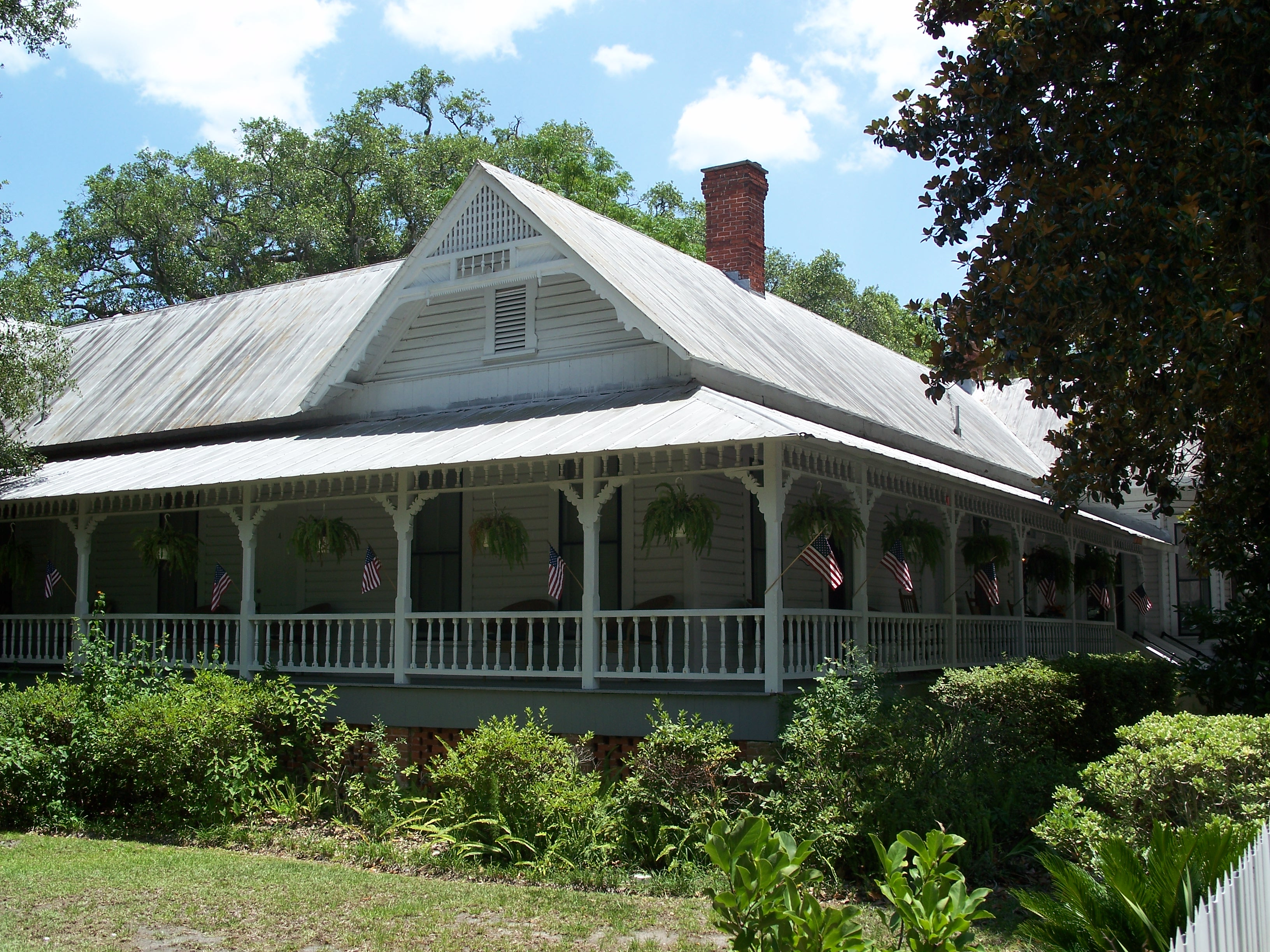

- Location within Florida Location within the United States
- Location: Lake Butler, Florida
- Coordinates: 30°01′17″N 82°20′32″W
- NRHP reference No.: 96000222
- Added to NRHP: February 29, 1996

The James W. Townsend House is a U.S. historic home in Lake Butler, Florida. It is located at 235 Southwest 4th Avenue, south of SR 100. On February 29, 1996, it was added to the U.S. National Register of Historic Places.

== See also ==
- Townsend Building, also in Butler
