= Union County Courthouse (Florida) =

Courthouse in Lake Butler, Florida

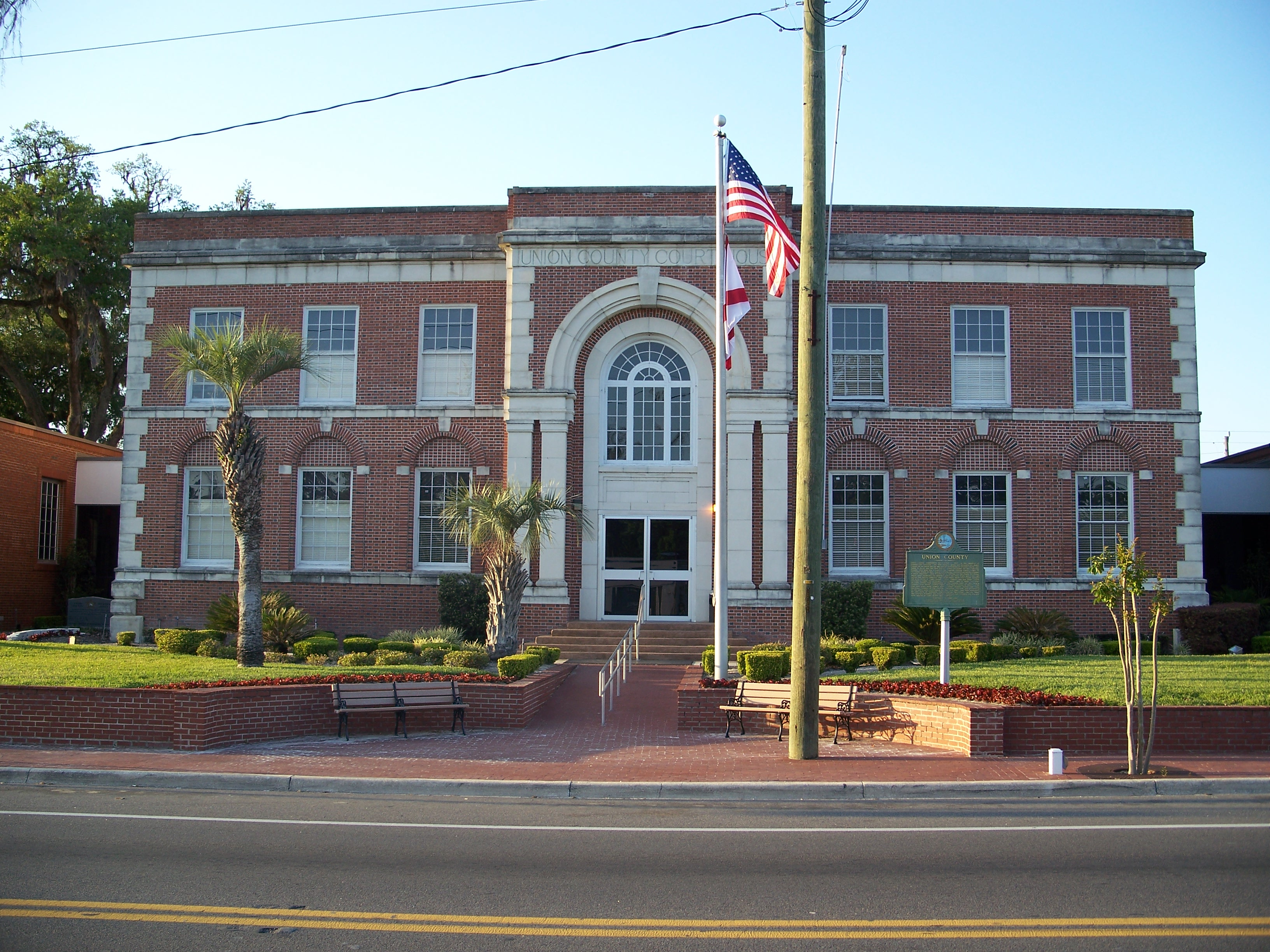
- Union County Courthouse
- Interactive map of the Union County Courthouse area

General information
- Architectural style: Classical Revival
- Location: Lake Butler, Florida, United States
- Coordinates: 30.023141°N 82.338558°W
- Completed: 1936
- Cost: $39,000, of which $7,000 was paid by the county and the rest by the WPA
- Client: Union County

Design and construction
- Architect: John Pearson of Gainesville
- Engineer: Builder: Works Project Administration

The Union County Courthouse is an historic redbrick courthouse building located in Lake Butler, Florida. Designed by John Pearson of Gainesville in the Classical Revival style, it was built in 1936 by the Works Project Administration to serve Union County, which had been carved out of Bradford County in 1921. It is located on the site of a former courthouse that served the county of New River, Bradford's original name. In 1967 additions to the courthouse were designed by Harry E. Burns, Jr., and were built by Vinson J. Forrester, Jr.

In 1989, the Union County Courthouse was listed in A Guide to Florida's Historic Architecture, published by the University of Florida Press.
