= Union County High School (Florida) =

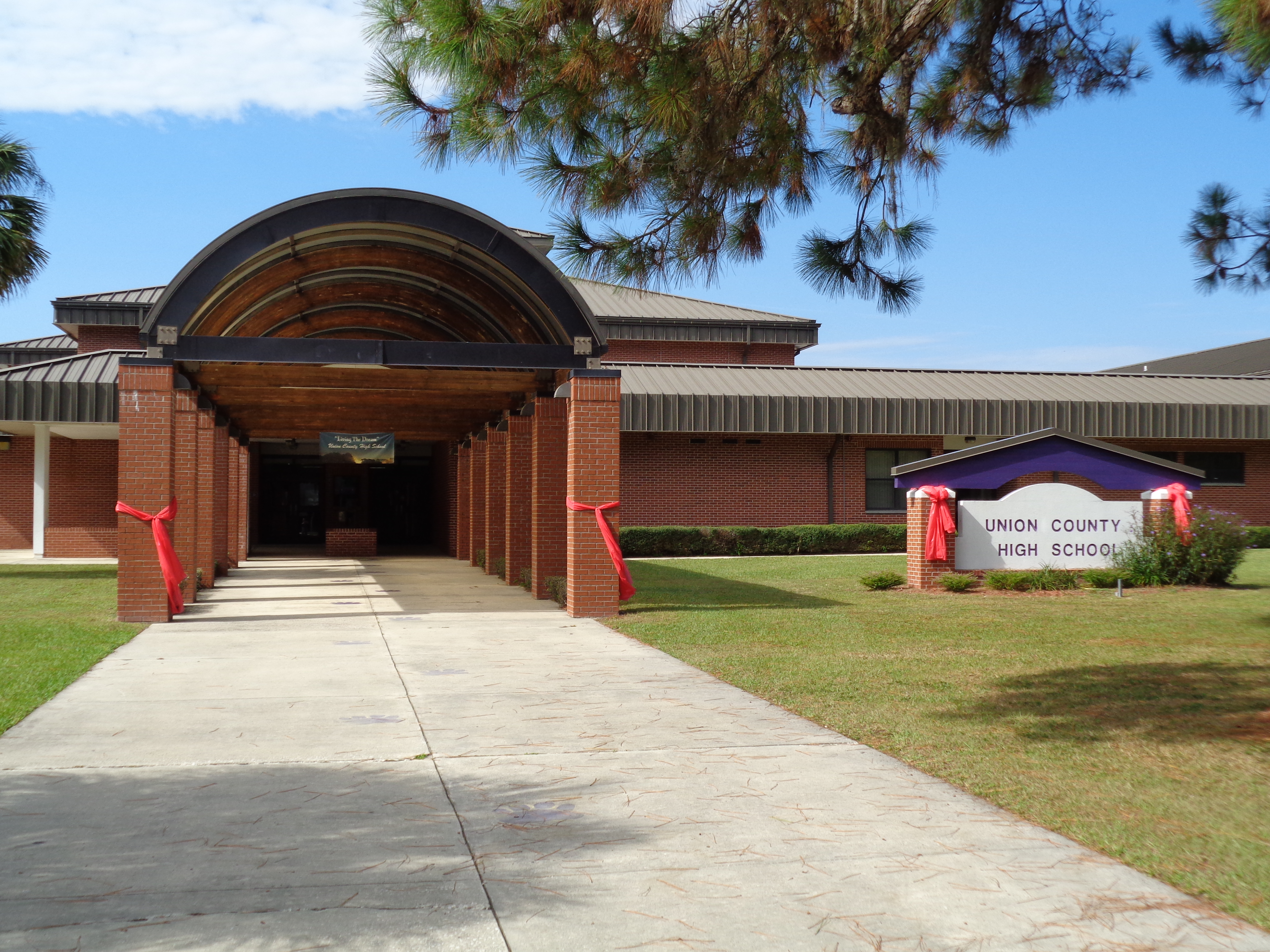

Location
- 1000 S Lake Ave; Lake Butler, Florida 32054; United States
- 30.014897°N 82.339419°W

Information
- Type: Public school
- Motto: "To Provide a learning environment where students, staff, parents, and community excel."
- Established: 1908
- Principal: Julie Denson
- Staff: 40.50 (on an FTE basis)
- Enrollment: 633 (2022-23)
- Student to teacher ratio: 15.63
- Campus: Rural, 18 acres
- Colors: Purple █, Gold █
- Mascot: Fighting Tigers
- Website: union_uchs.campuscontact.com

Union County High School is an American high school located in Lake Butler, Florida, whose history dates to the 1920s after the secession from Bradford County, when it was originally located as the Lake Butler Middle School. Before segregation ended, it was an all-white school and the now elementary school served the county's African-American population. It now serves secondary students within the Union County school district in grades 9-12. The school offers special curricula which include Honors courses, Advanced Placement, and Vo-Tech courses.

The school has been accredited by the Southern Association of Colleges and Schools since December 31, 1960.

== School programs ==
=== Special Education ===
The Special Education is a very renowned program at Union County High School. The program along with its sister club, The National FFA Organization, has competed and won many awards sending its members onto Regional, State, and National competitions.

=== Business Education ===
The Business Education program at Union County High School is a very successful one leading its students to receive Microsoft Career Technical Certificates in their first year enrolled. The program offers training in running a business type-school store with an actual computerized cashier system, design and journalism techniques in the development of the school's yearbook, the UC Design, and in publication and journalism in the production of the school's weekly newsletter, the Roar.

The program also pulls from its students the members of its sister organization, Future Business Leaders of America-Phi Beta Lambda. The program has won many awards and send its members to regional and state competitions and leader conventions.

=== Health Department ===
Union County High School offers real world applicable training and certification in nursing. The program is run by a registered nurse and a certified science and health instructor. The school repeatedly graduates Assistant Nurses every year that go on to become Registered Nurses(RN). Upon the fourth year, students begin their clinical training at local nursing, hospital, or Starke-Nursing homes.

The organization is also co-developed to support its sister organization, HOSA - Future Health Professionals, that go on to compete in many areas of the Health Industry.

=== Leadership Education ===
For going on 10 years, Union County High School runs a leadership education program through its affiliated in the Army Junior Reserves Officer Training Corp.

The program is designated by the 6th Brigade as an Honor Unit with Distinction and operates a special teams program made up of Color Guard, Male-Mix un-armed and armed, Female un-armed and armed, and Raiders. The program also consists of a leadership chain-of-command that imitates an actual battalion. The program consistently builds many leaders throughout the school.

=== Vocation Technology ===
While Union County High School does not itself provide a full program in vocational technology, it does provide wood-shop to be delineated. Students take courses at the Bradford-Union Area Career Technical Center by commuting there every morning.

=== Unified Arts Program ===
The school offers a Unified Arts program where students may take classes in the Art department or in Music Theory and Band.

=== Athletics ===
As well as being academically focused, the school has a full athletics program to provide students with physical activity and morale. These sports include, but are not limited to:

- Football
- Basketball
- Track & Field
- Drill
- Golf
- Tennis
- Volleyball
- Baseball/Softball
- Competitive Cheerleading
- Weightlifting
- Wrestling

== Notable alumni ==
- C. J. Spiller, running back for the Clemson Tigers football team, 2006–2009, 9th overall pick in the 2010 NFL draft (Buffalo Bills)
- Gerard Warren, defensive tackle for the Florida Gators football team, 1998-2000, 3rd overall pick in the 2001 NFL draft (Cleveland Browns)
