= Union County Schools =

School district in South Carolina, US

Union County Schools is a school district headquartered in Union, South Carolina, United States. It serves Union County.

== Schools ==
- Buffalo Elementary School
- Forest Park Elementary School
- Jonesville Elementary/Middle School
- Monarch Elementary School
- Sims Middle School
- Union County Career & Technology Center
- Union County High School
