= Lake Butler, Union County, Florida =

Lake Butler, Florida
- City
- City of Lake Butler
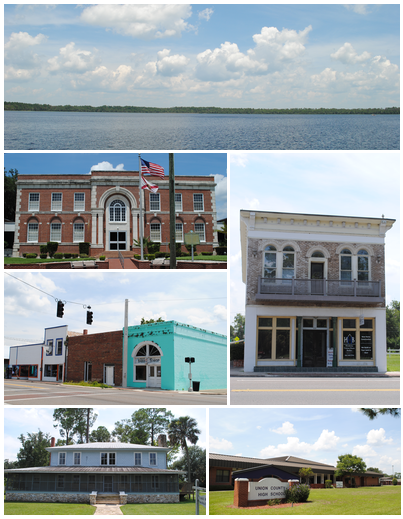
- Images from top, left to right: Butler Lake, Union County Courthouse, Downtown Lake Butler, Townsend-Green Building & Museum, Lake Butler Woman's Club, Union County High School

- Seal
- Motto: "[Your] Welcome Home Community"
- Location in Union County and the state of Florida
- Coordinates: 30°01′05″N 82°20′32″W
- Country: United States
- State: Florida
- County: Union
- Settled: 1859
- Incorporated: May 1893

Government
  - Type: Commission–Manager
  - Mayor: Melissa Hendrix
  - Vice Mayor: Rondoll L. Huggins
  - Commissioners: Joe Stephenson, Annette G. Redman, and Fred Sirmones
  - City Manager and City Clerk: Kimberly Hayes
  - City Attorney: John E. Maines IV

Area
  - Total: 2.45 sq mi (6.35 km^{2})
  - Land: 2.31 sq mi (5.98 km^{2})
  - Water: 0.14 sq mi (0.36 km^{2})
- Elevation: 135 ft (41 m)

Population (2020)
  - Total: 1,986
  - Density: 859.8/sq mi (331.96/km^{2})
- Time zone: UTC-5 (EST)
  - Summer (DST): UTC-4 (EDT)
- ZIP code: 32054
- Area code: 386
- FIPS code: 12-37650
- GNIS feature ID: 2404858
- Website: www.cityoflakebutler.com

Lake Butler is a city in and the county seat of Union County, Florida, United States. The population was 1,986 at the 2020 census.

== History ==
The city was founded in 1859, and the land was platted for settlement the same year. A post office called "Lake Butler" has been in operation since 1860. The post office's namesake was adopted by the community, and is named after the city's nearby lake, which in turn was named for Robert Butler, who was a colonel and commander for the U.S. Army, as well as an acting governor of East Florida. The City of Lake Butler was officially incorporated as a municipality on May 1893.

== Geography ==
According to the United States Census Bureau, the city has a total area of 1.8 square miles (4.7 km^{2}), of which 1.7 square miles (4.4 km^{2}) is land and 0.1 square miles (0.26 km^{2}) (6.01%) is water.

=== Climate ===
The climate in this area is characterized by hot, humid summers and generally mild winters. According to the Köppen climate classification, the City of Lake Butler has a humid subtropical climate zone (Cfa).

== Demographics ==
Historical population
Census	Pop.	Note	%±
1900	431		—
1910	685		58.9%
1920	756		10.4%
1930	886		17.2%
1940	923		4.2%
1950	1,040		12.7%
1960	1,311		26.1%
1970	1,598		21.9%
1980	1,830		14.5%
1990	2,116		15.6%
2000	1,927		−8.9%
2010	1,897		−1.6%
2020	1,986		4.7%
U.S. Decennial Census

=== 2010 and 2020 census ===
Lake Butler racial composition (Hispanics excluded from racial categories) (NH = Non-Hispanic)
Race	Pop 2010	Pop 2020	% 2010	% 2020
White (NH)	1,280	1,278	67.47%	64.35%
Black or African American (NH)	496	486	26.15%	24.47%
Native American or Alaska Native (NH)	4	4	0.21%	0.20%
Asian (NH)	7	7	0.37%	0.35%
Pacific Islander or Native Hawaiian (NH)	1	0	0.05%	0.00%
Some other race (NH)	1	14	0.05%	0.70%
Two or more races/Multiracial (NH)	26	94	1.37%	4.73%
Hispanic or Latino (any race)	82	103	4.32%	5.19%
Total	1,897	1,986		

As of the 2020 United States census, there were 1,986 people, 669 households, and 437 families residing in the city.

As of the 2010 United States census, there were 1,897 people, 777 households, and 458 families residing in the city.

=== 2000 census ===
As of the census of 2000, there were 1,927 people, 723 households, and 508 families residing in the city. The population density was 1,121.2 inhabitants per square mile (432.9/km^{2}). There were 832 housing units at an average density of 484.1 per square mile (186.9/km^{2}). The racial makeup of the city was 64.50% White, 31.81% African American, 0.26% Native American, 0.83% Asian, 0.10% Pacific Islander, 1.19% from other races, and 1.30% from two or more races. Hispanic or Latino of any race were 3.68% of the population.

In 2000, there were 723 households, out of which 41.1% had children under the age of 18 living with them, 39.7% were married couples living together, 26.4% had a female householder with no husband present, and 29.7% were non-families. 26.7% of all households were made up of individuals, and 10.2% had someone living alone who was 65 years of age or older. The average household size was 2.63 and the average family size was 3.16.

In 2000, in the city, the population was spread out, with 33.6% under the age of 18, 10.6% from 18 to 24, 25.2% from 25 to 44, 18.8% from 45 to 64, and 11.8% who were 65 years of age or older. The median age was 30 years. For every 100 females, there were 85.5 males. For every 100 females age 18 and over, there were 79.3 males.

In 2000, the median income for a household in the city was $25,347, and the median income for a family was $29,000. Males had a median income of $26,951 versus $20,814 for females. The per capita income for the city was $14,174. About 22.3% of families and 25.6% of the population were below the poverty line, including 30.6% of those under age 18 and 28.8% of those age 65 or over.

== Education ==
Public primary and secondary schools in Lake Butler and Union County are administered by Union County School District, which is governed by an elected, five-member Union County School Board. The district administers four schools.

- Lake Butler Elementary School, that services Pre-K–4th grade
- Lake Butler Middle School, that services 5th–8th grade
- Union County High School, that services 9th–12th grade and one Adult Education program.

== Economy ==
As of 1985, almost all of the residents of Lake Butler work in Florida Department of Corrections prisons, are related to prison employees, do business with prison employees, and/or know prison employees.

The Reception and Medical Center (RMC) complex is outside of the Lake Butler city limits.

== Notable people ==
- Jay North, actor best known for playing the character "Dennis" in the TV series Dennis the Menace (1959–1963)
- Andrew Peterson, Christian singer-songwriter
- C. J. Spiller, former NFL running back
- Gerard Warren, former NFL defensive tackle
