= Roggan =

Roggan may refer to:

- Roggan Lake, a lake in Western Quebec
- Roggan River, Quebec, a small village in Northern Quebec
- Roggan River, a river in Northern Quebec.

== See also ==
- Roggen, surname
- Rogan, surname
