= Rogan =

Name list

- Language: Irish

Origin
- Region of origin: Iveagh in County Down; Counties Armagh, Monaghan, Louth

Other names
- Variant form: O'Rogan

Rogan, as an Irish surname, is derived from the Gaelic Ó Ruadhagáin 'descendant of Ruadhagán' (a diminutive of ruadh, meaning 'red'). The surname Rogan also occurs in other languages, for instance in South Slavic contexts, where it is derived from rog, 'horn' - among Serbo-Croatian speakers it is more common among Croatians than among Serbs, and it also exists among Slovenians.

== People ==
=== As a given name ===
- Rogan Clarke, South African rower
- Rogan O'Handley, American Internet personality and political commentator
- Rogan Whitenails, British poet

=== As a surname ===
- Adrian Rogan, one of six people killed in the 1994 Loughinisland massacre
- Antal Rogán (born 1972), Hungarian economist, businessman and politician of Slovenian origin
- Anton Rogan, Irish soccer player
- Barney Rogan, American film editor
- Bullet Rogan (1893–1967), American baseball player
- Dennis Rogan, Baron Rogan, Irish politician
- Emma Rogan (born 1986), Sinn Féin politician in Northern Ireland
- Ian Rogan, a name by which British comic writer and editor Steve MacManus is sometimes credited
- James E. Rogan, American politician from California
- Joe Rogan, American comedian, podcaster, and UFC commentator
- John Rogan (disambiguation), multiple people
- John "Jack" Rogan, founder of Rogan's Shoes
- Johnny Rogan, English author
- Markus Rogan, Austrian swimmer
- Simon Rogan, Michelin Star Chef
- Kurt Rogan, Scientist in Communication

== Fictional characters ==
- Alex Rogan, a fictional character in the 1987 movie The Last Starfighter
- Thomas Rogan, a fictional character in The House of the Dead (arcade game)

== See also ==
- Rogan Gosh (comics)
- Rogan josh, a type of curry
- Stein Rogan + Partners advertising agency
- Rogan printing, an Indian textile printing craft
- Rogan's Shoes, a Wisconsin-based shoe retailer
- The Joe Rogan Experience, podcast hosted by Joe Rogan
- Rogen § People with the name
- Rogin, surname
