= List of Jacksonville Jaguars first-round draft picks =

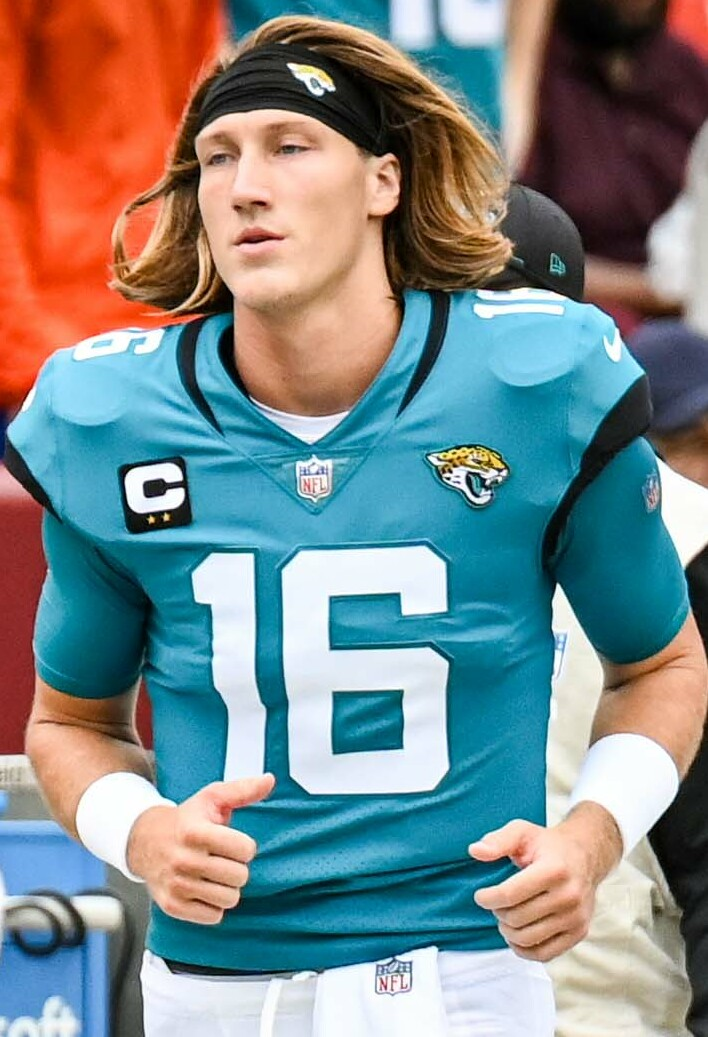
Trevor Lawrence is a quarterback who was drafted first overall by the Jaguars in the 2021 NFL draft. He was selected for the 2023 Pro Bowl.

The Jacksonville Jaguars are a professional American football team based in Jacksonville, Florida. The Jaguars compete in the National Football League (NFL) as a member of the South Division of the American Football Conference. The Jaguars joined the NFL in 1995 as an expansion team, along with the Carolina Panthers. The team plays its home games at EverBank Stadium in downtown Jacksonville.

The NFL draft, officially known as the "NFL Annual Player Selection Meeting", is an annual event which serves as the league's most common source of player recruitment. The draft order is determined based on the previous season's standings; the teams with the worst win–loss records receive the earliest picks. Teams that qualified for the NFL playoffs select after non-qualifiers, and their order depends on how far they advanced, using their regular season record as a tie-breaker. The final two selections in the first round are reserved for the Super Bowl runner-up and champion. Draft picks are tradable and players or other picks can be acquired with them.

Since the team's first draft in 1995, the Jaguars have selected 36 players in the first round. The team's first selection in their inaugural NFL draft was Tony Boselli, a tackle from the University of Southern California; he was the second overall selection. Boselli is the Jaguars' only draft pick to be elected to the Pro Football Hall of Fame. The Jaguars have held the first overall pick twice and selected Trevor Lawrence in 2021 and Travon Walker in 2022. Their most recent draft pick was in 2025, when the Jaguars selected Travis Hunter, a two-way player from the University of Colorado Boulder.

== Player selections ==
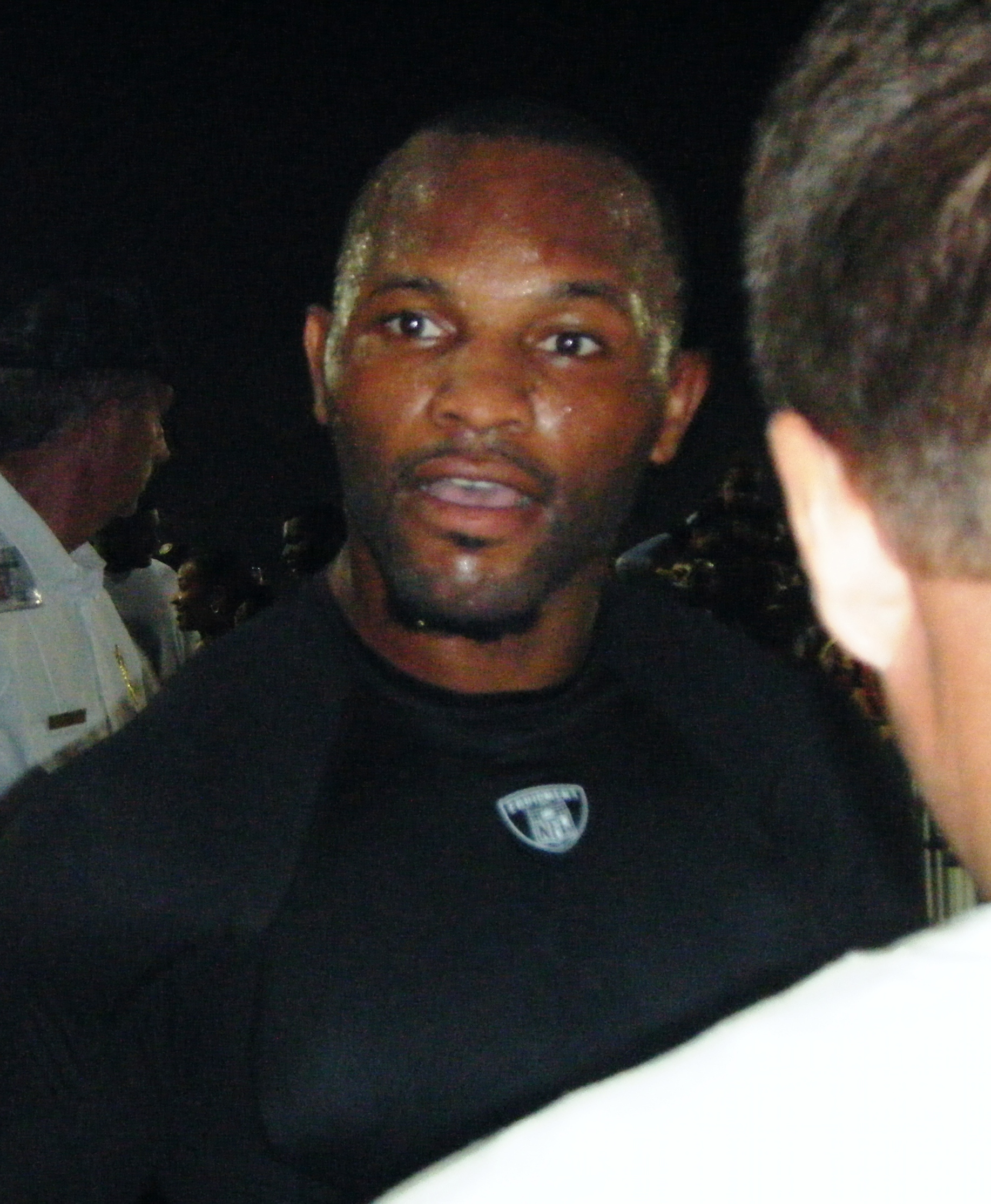
Running back Fred Taylor was drafted by the Jaguars in the first round of the 1998 NFL draft. Taylor spent 11 seasons with the team, during which time he was an All-Pro, Pro Bowler, and was selected for the 1998 PFWA All-Rookie Team. He has since been inducted into the Pride of the Jaguars.

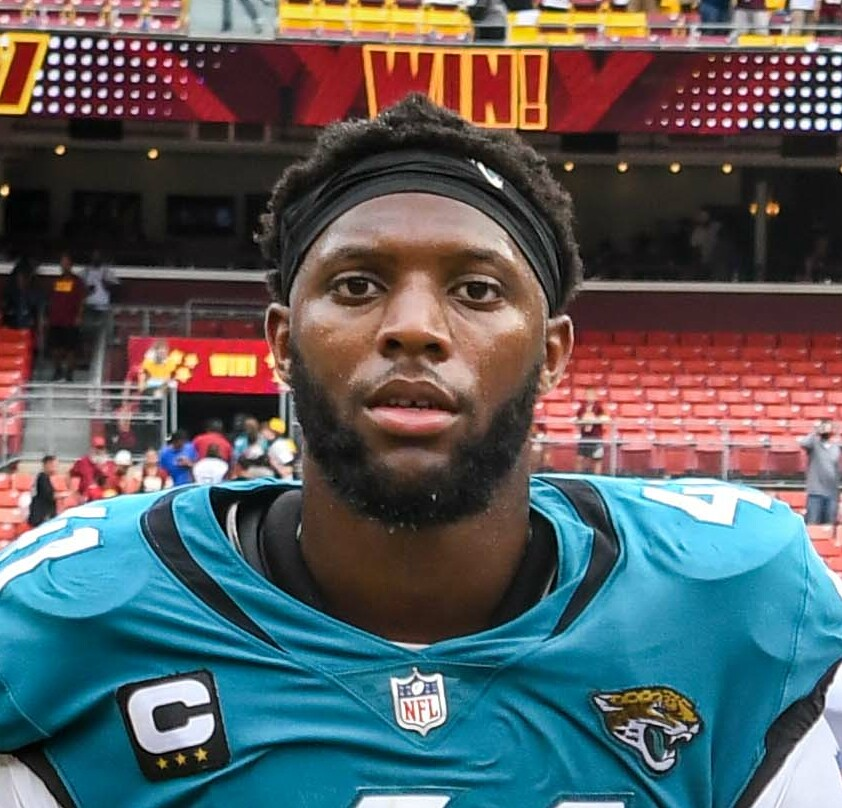
Edge rusher Josh Hines-Allen was selected seventh overall in the first round of the 2019 NFL draft. Since that time, he has been selected to two Pro Bowls and the 2019 PFWA All-Rookie Team.

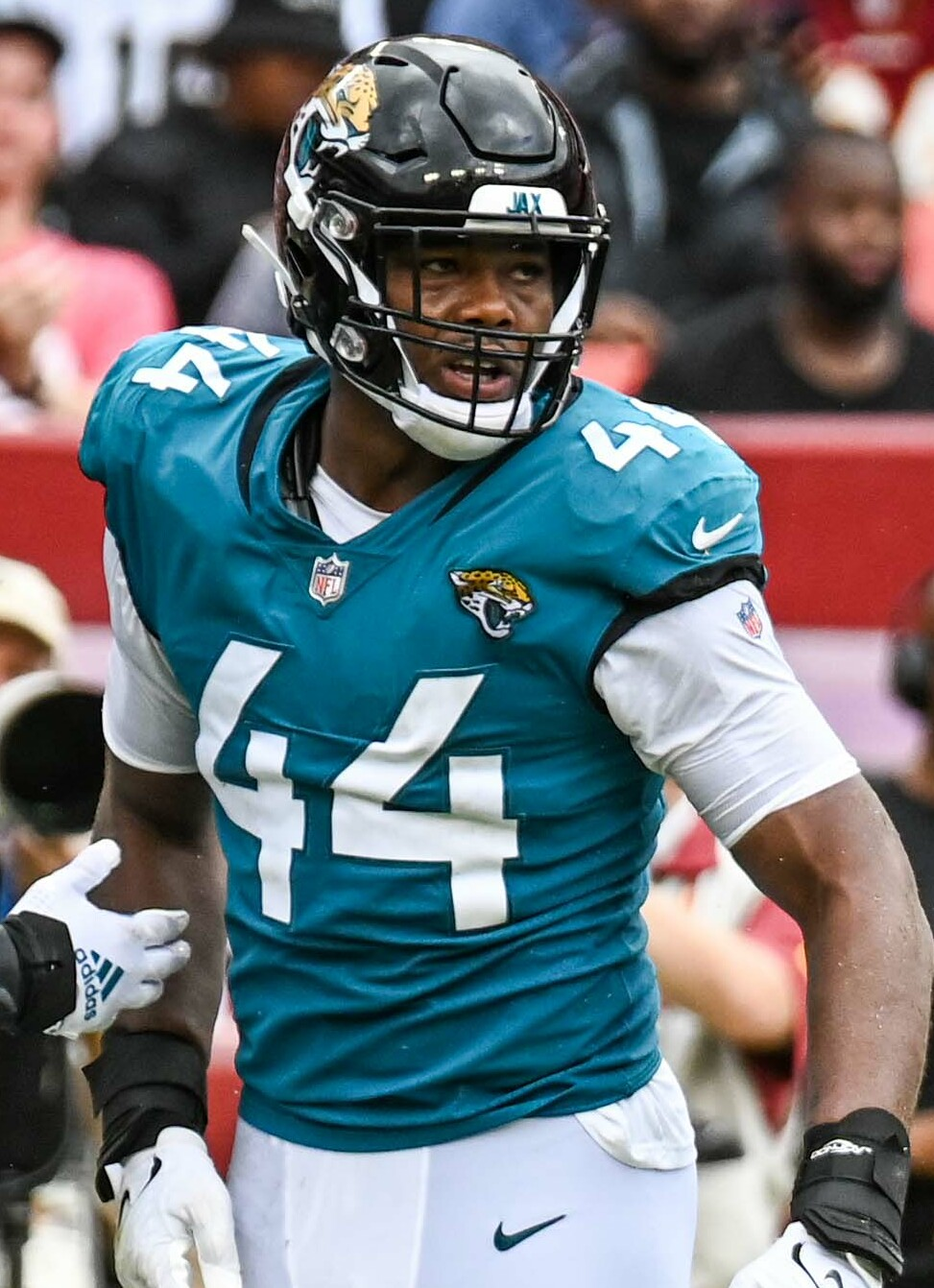
Linebacker Travon Walker was selected first overall by the Jaguars in the 2022 NFL draft.

Key
Symbol	Meaning
†	Inducted into the Pro Football Hall of Fame
*	Selected number one overall

Position abbreviations
CB	Cornerback
DB	Defensive back
DE	Defensive end
DT	Defensive tackle
LB	Linebacker
QB	Quarterback
RB	Running back
T	Tackle
TE	Tight end
WR	Wide receiver

Jacksonville Jaguars first-round draft picks by season
Season	Pick	Player name	Pos.	College	Notes
1995	2	Tony Boselli†	T	USC	
1995	19	James Stewart	RB	Tennessee	Moved up draft order in trade with Kansas City Chiefs (Note: In 1995, the NFL awarded its two new expansion teams – the Carolina Panthers and Jacksonville Jaguars – an extra draft pick in each round of the 1995 NFL draft.) (Note: Jacksonville traded a 1995 first-, third-, and fourth-round selection (Nos. 31, 97, and 134 overall) and 1996 fourth-round selection (No. 113 overall) to the Kansas City Chiefs in exchange for their 1995 first-round selection (No. 19 overall).)
1996	2	Kevin Hardy	LB	Illinois	
1997	21	Renaldo Wynn	DT	Notre Dame	
1998	9	Fred Taylor	RB	Florida	Pick received from Buffalo Bills (Note: Jacksonville traded quarterback Rob Johnson to the Buffalo Bills in exchange for their 1998 first- and fourth-round selections (Nos. 9 and 101 overall).)
1998	25	Donovin Darius	DB	Syracuse	
1999	26	Fernando Bryant	DB	Alabama	
2000	29	R. Jay Soward	WR	USC	
2001	13	Marcus Stroud	DT	Georgia	
2002	9	John Henderson	DT	Tennessee	
2003	7	Byron Leftwich	QB	Marshall	Moved up draft order due to the Minnesota Vikings not submitting their pick in time (Note: Jacksonville was originally held the No. 8 overall pick but drafted at pick No. 7 due to the Minnesota Vikings failing to submit their pick within the allotted time frame.)
2004	9	Reggie Williams	WR	Washington	
2005	21	Matt Jones	WR	Arkansas	
2006	28	Marcedes Lewis	TE	UCLA	
2007	21	Reggie Nelson	DB	Florida	Moved down draft order in trade with Denver Broncos (Note: Jacksonville traded their 2007 first-round selection (No. 17 overall) to the Denver Broncos in exchange for their 2007 first-, third-, and sixth-round selections (Nos. 21, 86, and 198 overall).)
2008	8	Derrick Harvey	DE	Florida	Moved up draft order in trade with Baltimore Ravens (Note: Jacksonville traded their 2008 first-, fourth-, and two third-round selections (Nos. 26, 125, 71, and 89 overall) to the Baltimore Ravens in exchange for their 2008 first-round selection (No. 8 overall).)
2009	8	Eugene Monroe	T	Virginia	
2010	10	Tyson Alualu	DT	California	
2011	10	Blaine Gabbert	QB	Missouri	Moved up draft order in trade with Washington Redskins (Note: Jacksonville traded their 2011 first- and second-round selections (Nos. 16 and 49 overall) to the Washington Redskins in exchange for their 2011 first-round selection (No. 10 overall).)
2012	5	Justin Blackmon	WR	Oklahoma State	Moved up draft order in trade with Tampa Bay Buccaneers (Note: Jacksonville traded their 2012 first- and fourth-round selections (Nos. 7 and 101 overall) to the Tampa Bay Buccaneers in exchange for their 2012 first-round selection (No. 5 overall).)
2013	2	Luke Joeckel	T	Texas A&M	
2014	3	Blake Bortles	QB	UCF	
2015	3	Dante Fowler	DE	Florida	
2016	5	Jalen Ramsey	CB	Florida State	
2017	4	Leonard Fournette	RB	LSU	
2018	29	Taven Bryan	DT	Florida	
2019	7	Josh Hines-Allen	DE	Kentucky	
2020	9	C. J. Henderson	CB	Florida	
2020	20	K'Lavon Chaisson	LB	LSU	Pick received from Los Angeles Rams (Note: Jacksonville traded cornerback Jalen Ramsey to the Los Angeles Rams in exchange for their 2020 first-round selection (No. 20 overall) and 2021 first- and fourth-round selections (Nos. 25 and 130 overall).)
2021	1	Trevor Lawrence*	QB	Clemson	
2021	25	Travis Etienne	RB	Clemson	Pick received from Los Angeles Rams
2022	1	Travon Walker*	DE	Georgia	
2022	27	Devin Lloyd	LB	Utah	Moved up draft order in trade with Tampa Bay Buccaneers (Note: Jacksonville traded their 2022 second-, fourth-, and sixth-round selections (Nos. 33, 106, and 180 overall) to the Tampa Bay Buccaneers in exchange for their 2022 first-round selection (No. 27 overall).)
2023	27	Anton Harrison	T	Oklahoma	Moved down draft order in trades with New York Giants (Note: Jacksonville traded their 2023 first-round selection (No. 24 overall) to the New York Giants in exchange for their 2023 first-, fifth-, and seventh-round selections (Nos. 25, 160, and 240 overall).) and Buffalo Bills (Note: Jacksonville traded a 2023 first-round selection (No. 25 overall, received from the New York Giants) to the Buffalo Bills in exchange for their 2023 first- and fourth-round selections (Nos. 27 and 130 overall).)
2024	23	Brian Thomas Jr.	WR	LSU	Moved down draft order in trade with Minnesota Vikings (Note: Jacksonville traded their 2024 first-round selection (No. 17 overall) to the Minnesota Vikings in exchange for their 2024 first- and fifth-round selections (Nos. 23 and 167 overall) and 2025 third- and fourth-round selections (nos. yet to be determined).)
2025	2	Travis Hunter	WR/CB	Colorado	Moved up draft order in trade with Cleveland Browns (Note: Jacksonville traded their 2025 first-, second-, and fourth-round selections (Nos. 5, 36, and 126 overall) and 2026 first-round selection (No. yet to be determined) to the Cleveland Browns in exchange for their 2025 first-, fourth-, and sixth-round selections (Nos. 2, 104, and 200 overall).)
2026	No pick				Pick traded to Cleveland Browns

== See also ==
- History of the Jacksonville Jaguars
- Jacksonville Jaguars draft history
- List of Jacksonville Jaguars seasons
