= History of the Jacksonville Jaguars =

History of the American football team

The history of the Jacksonville Jaguars, an American football team in the National Football League (NFL), formally dates to November 30, 1993, when the NFL awarded Jacksonville, Florida the expansion franchise that became the Jacksonville Jaguars. The Jaguars, along with the Carolina Panthers, started play in the 1995 NFL season as expansion teams.

== Forerunners ==
Attempts to bring professional football to Jacksonville dated as early as 1925; eventual Hall of Famer Ernie Nevers played his professional rookie season with a team in Jacksonville that year, before the team folded, unable to afford Nevers's salary. By the 1970s, leagues other than the NFL had begun placing franchises in the city; the Jacksonville Sharks and Jacksonville Express played in the World Football League, the Jacksonville Firebirds played in the American Football Association and the Jacksonville Bulls played in the United States Football League. In 1987, Jacksonville made an unsuccessful pitch to Bud Adams to relocate the Houston Oilers to Jacksonville; Adams ultimately received the stadium renovations for the Astrodome that he sought and kept the team in Houston roughly a decade longer before moving the team to Tennessee.

== Welcome to the NFL: 1991–1994 ==
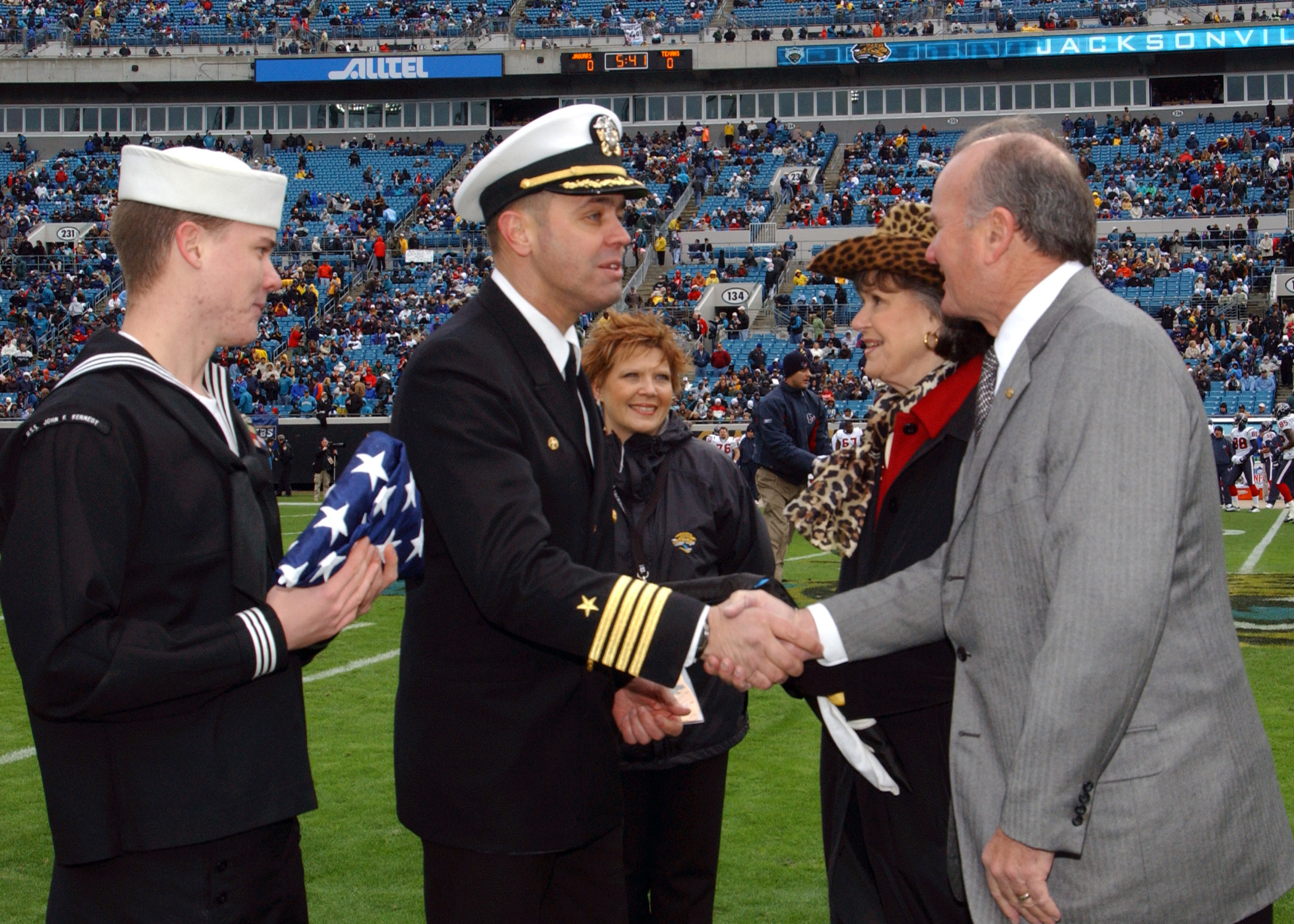
Wayne Weaver (right) was the first owner of the Jacksonville Jaguars from 1993 to 2011.

In 1989, the prospective ownership group Touchdown Jacksonville! was organized. The group initially included future Florida Governor Jeb Bush and Jacksonville developer Tom Petway, and came to be led by shoe magnate Wayne Weaver, founder of Nine West. In 1991, the NFL announced plans to add two expansion teams in 1994 (later delayed until 1995), its first expansion since the 1976 addition of the Seattle Seahawks and the Tampa Bay Buccaneers. Touchdown Jacksonville! announced its bid for a team, and Jacksonville was ultimately chosen as one of five finalists, along with Charlotte, St. Louis, Baltimore, and Memphis.

Jacksonville was considered the least likely expansion candidate for several reasons. The Jacksonville metropolitan area and television market were smaller than those of nearly every team in the league. Jacksonville was the 54th largest television market, and only Green Bay had a smaller TV market (Jacksonville has since moved up to 42nd, trailed by New Orleans, Buffalo and Green Bay.) Although Jacksonville was the 15th largest city in the nation at the time by city proper population (it has since grown to become the 11th-largest as of 2025), it has always been a medium-sized market because, as a consolidated city-county with Duval County, the city bounds already encompass most of the metropolitan area. There were 635,000 people in Jacksonville proper according to the 1990 census, but only 900,000 people in the metropolitan area. Additionally, the Gator Bowl was outdated, and the ownership group struggled to negotiate a lease with the city. The troubled negotiations over the Gator Bowl lease led the ownership group to withdraw from the NFL expansion bidding in July 1993.

Charlotte was awarded the first franchise – the Carolina Panthers – in October 1993. Surprisingly, the naming of the second expansion city was delayed a month. Most pundits speculated that the delay was made to allow St. Louis to shore up its bid. At the time, St. Louis was considered the favorite for the second franchise, with Baltimore's three bids also considered strong. However, in a surprising move, the NFL owners voted 26–2 in favor of awarding the 30th franchise to Jacksonville.

After the Gator Bowl game on December 31, 1993, the old stadium was essentially demolished and replaced with a reinforced concrete superstructure. All that remained of the old stadium was the west upper concourse and a portion of the ramping system. To accommodate construction, the 1994 and 1995 games of "The World's Largest Outdoor Cocktail Party" were split between the home fields of Florida and Georgia, and the 1994 Gator Bowl was played at Ben Hill Griffin Stadium in Gainesville.

The Jaguars were put in the AFC Central to increase the size of that division to five (later six) teams; similar to their in-state NFC counterparts, the Tampa Bay Buccaneers, their division was geographically inaccurate as the majority of their divisional rivals were located in the midwest region.

== Tom Coughlin and Mark Brunell era: 1994–2002 ==
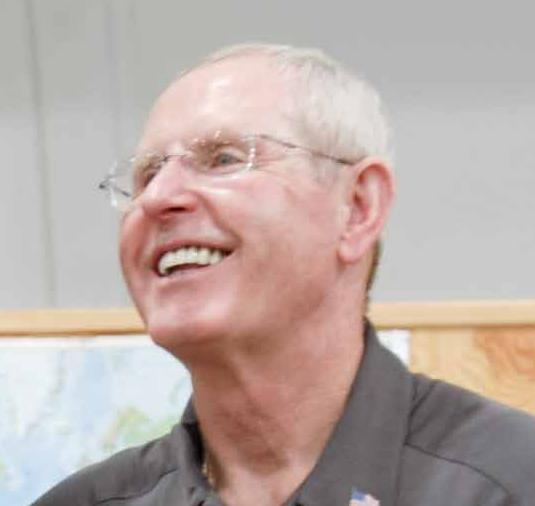
Tom Coughlin was Jacksonville's head coach for its first eight seasons

In January 1994, Wayne Weaver chose Tom Coughlin as the first-ever head coach of the Jaguars. Coughlin had worked in the NFL as a position coach, but he had been neither a head coach nor a coordinator in the NFL.

The Jaguars' hiring of Coughlin contrasted with the hiring moves made by their fellow expansion team. The same month that Weaver hired Coughlin as his head coach, Carolina Panthers owner Jerry Richardson went a more conventional route and hired former Buffalo Bills general manager Bill Polian as the Panthers' first GM (the Panthers' head coach, Dom Capers, would not be hired until a full year after Coughlin). As it emerged that Weaver had no intention of hiring a general manager, it became apparent that Coughlin would have most of the authority regarding hiring decisions. Coughlin spent his year as "head coach without a team" preparing for the personnel moves that would come from the expansion draft, free agency, and the rookie draft in the spring of 1995.

=== 1995 ===
Along with the Carolina Panthers, the Jacksonville Jaguars entered the NFL as the first expansion teams in almost twenty years. Both teams participated in the 1995 NFL expansion draft, with the Jaguars taking Steve Beuerlein with the first pick. Beuerlein quickly lost his starting job to former Green Bay Packers backup Mark Brunell. The Jaguars finished their inaugural season with a record of 4–12. While this fell short of the 7–9 mark recorded by the Panthers, other than this and the 1960 records of the charter American Football League teams the Jaguars' record was still the best recorded in an inaugural season by any NFL team which commenced play after 1950. The inaugural season featured many of the players who would lead Jacksonville into the playoffs in the team's next four seasons, including quarterback Mark Brunell (acquired in a draft day trade from Green Bay), offensive lineman Tony Boselli (drafted with the second pick overall in the 1995 NFL draft) running back James Stewart (also drafted in 1995), and wide receiver Jimmy Smith (signed as a free agent).

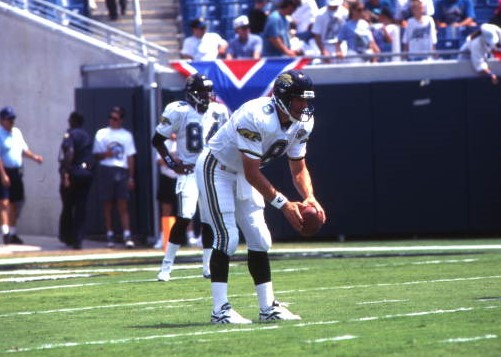
Mark Brunell practicing with the Jaguars before their inaugural game on September 3, 1995.

The team played its first regular season game at home in front of a crowd of 72,363 on September 3, a 10–3 loss against the Houston Oilers. The team picked up its first win in Week 4 as the Jaguars defeated the Oilers 17–16 on October 1 in Houston. The next week against the Pittsburgh Steelers, the Jaguars earned their first home win by defeating the eventual AFC Champions 20–16. The team's other two wins came in a season sweep of the Cleveland Browns including a Week 17 24–21 victory sealed by a Mike Hollis 34-yard field goal in the Browns' final game before the team relocated to Baltimore and was renamed the Ravens.

=== 1996 ===
Jacksonville's 1996 season was a marked success as they won six of their last seven games of the season and finished with a record of 9–7. Quarterback Mark Brunell threw for over 4,000 yards and wide receivers Keenan McCardell and Jimmy Smith each accumulated over 1,000 receiving yards. In the team's final game of the regular season against the Atlanta Falcons, needing a win to earn a playoff berth, the Jaguars caught a bit of luck when Morten Andersen, one of the most accomplished kickers in NFL history, missed a 30-yard field goal with less than a minute remaining that would have given the Falcons the lead. The Jaguars clinched the fifth seed in the AFC playoffs.

The Jaguars visited the Buffalo Bills in their first playoff game in franchise history. Despite being a heavy underdog, the Jaguars won 30–27, and knocked Buffalo quarterback Jim Kelly out of what would turn out to be the last game of his career. Their next game was on the road against the Denver Broncos, who had earned the AFC's top seed with a 13–3 record and were widely regarded as the best team in the AFC, if not the NFL. While the Broncos scored two touchdowns early in the game, after the first quarter, the Jaguars largely dominated. In what is often regarded as one of the three biggest upsets in NFL playoff history, the Jaguars defeated the Broncos by the same score as the previous week against the Bills, 30–27. Upon their return home, the Jags were greeted by an estimated 40,000 fans at the stadium. Many of these fans had watched the game on the stadium JumboTron displays and had stayed into the early hours of the morning when the team arrived. In the AFC Championship Game, the Jaguars miracle season came to an end, as they lost 20–6 to the New England Patriots, in Foxboro. Their fellow second-year NFC expansion team, the Carolina Panthers, also got to their conference championship game, where they lost 30–13 to the eventual Super Bowl champion Green Bay Packers.

=== 1997–1999 ===
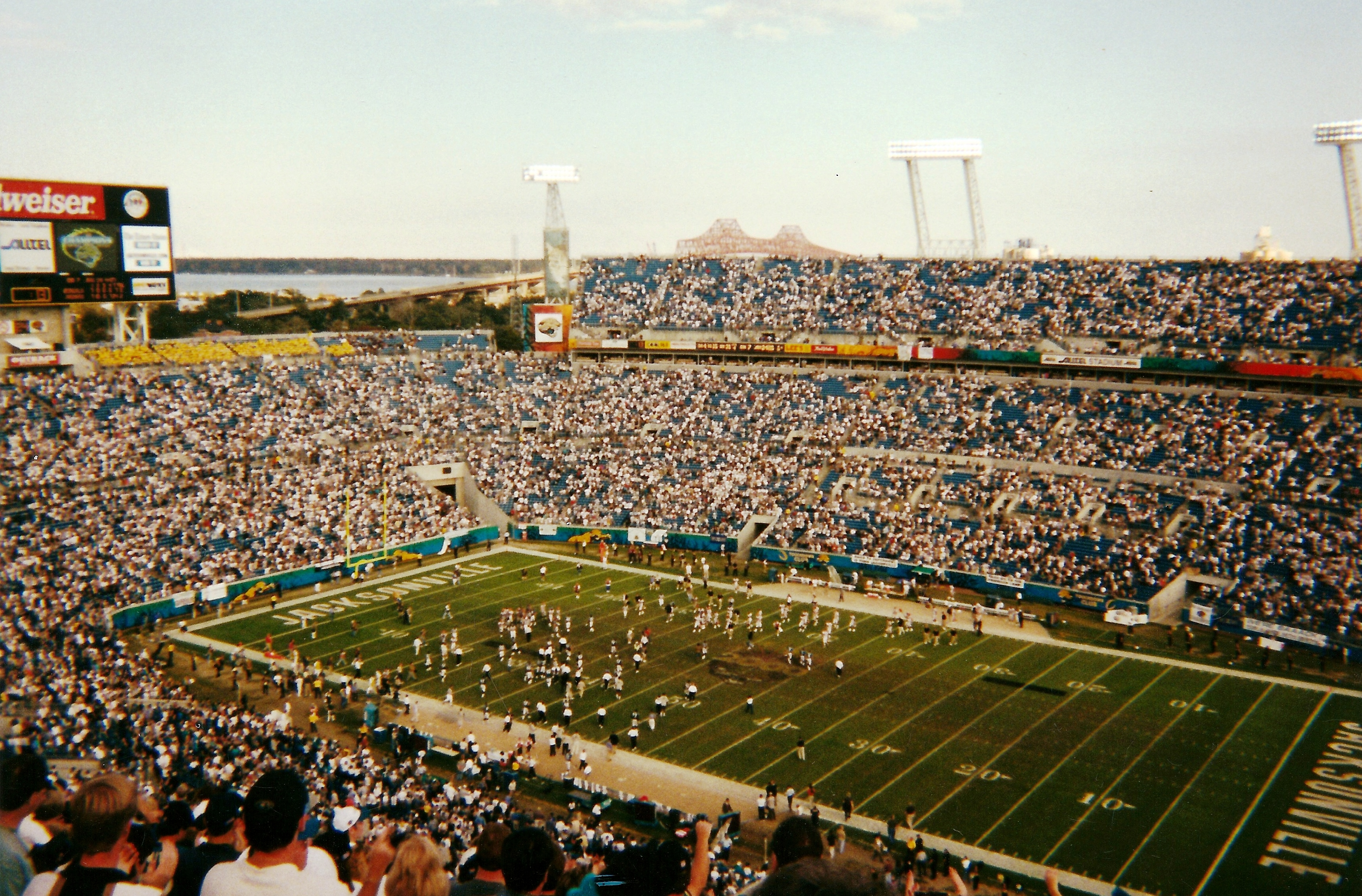
Jacksonville Jaguars vs. Cincinnati Bengals in January 2000.

In 1997, the franchise's third season, the Jaguars and the Steelers both finished the season with an 11–5 record, tops in the AFC Central Division. Pittsburgh won the division in a tiebreaker as a result of having higher net in division games than Jacksonville. As a result, the Jaguars settled for 2nd place in the division, a Wild Card berth and, for the second straight year, the 5th seed in the AFC playoffs. The Jags postseason would end quickly as they fell in their first game, a 42–17 defeat against the eventual Super Bowl champion Denver Broncos at Mile High Stadium. The Broncos, led by Terrell Davis, ran at will against the Jaguars, rushing for 5 touchdowns and over 300 yards.

In 1998, the Jaguars again finished 11–5 and won their first AFC Central Division title. The team became the first NFL expansion team to make the playoffs three times in its first four seasons of play. In the Wild Card Round, the Jaguars hosted their first home playoff game, a 25–10 win over the New England Patriots. The team's season ended the next week in the Divisional Round as the New York Jets defeated the Jaguars 34–24.

In 1999, the Jaguars compiled a league best 14–2 regular season record, the best record in franchise history. The team's two losses were to the Tennessee Titans. The Jaguars won the AFC Central Division for the second straight year and clinched the #1 seed in the AFC. The Jaguars hosted the Miami Dolphins in the AFC Divisional playoffs, a 62–7 victory in what would be Dan Marino and Jimmy Johnson's last NFL game. Jacksonville's 62 points and 55-point margin are the second most ever in NFL playoff history, and Fred Taylor's 90-yard run in the first quarter is the longest ever in an NFL playoff game.

The Jaguars' bid for a Super Bowl title came to an end the next week in the AFC championship game. The Jags fell at home to the Titans 33–14 in a game that the Jaguars led 14–10 at halftime, before allowing 23 unanswered points in the 2nd half. The Jaguars finished the 1999 season 15–3, with all three of their losses coming against the Titans. The loss marked the end of an era that saw the Jaguars make the playoffs in four of the team's first 5 years and would be the team's last playoff appearance until the 2005 season.

=== 2000–2002 ===
The Jaguars struggled during this period, due in part to salary cap problems. In the 2000 season, veteran quarterback Mark Brunell and young running back Fred Taylor led the squad through a painful 7–9 season. The Jaguars finished with records of 6–10 in both the 2001 and 2002 seasons.

After the 2002 season, head coach Tom Coughlin was fired after eight seasons, leading the Jaguars to a total record of 68–60 and four trips to the playoffs. The 2002 season also marked the last full season for Jaguars quarterback Mark Brunell, who was benched in the third game of 2003 in favor of Byron Leftwich. Brunell piled up over 25,000 yards as a Jaguar and earned three trips to the Pro Bowl. In 2002, the NFL split the two conferences into four divisions, sending the Jaguars to the geographically accurate AFC South. This put them in the same division as the Indianapolis Colts, Tennessee Titans, and the expansion Houston Texans.

== Jack Del Rio era: 2003–2011 ==
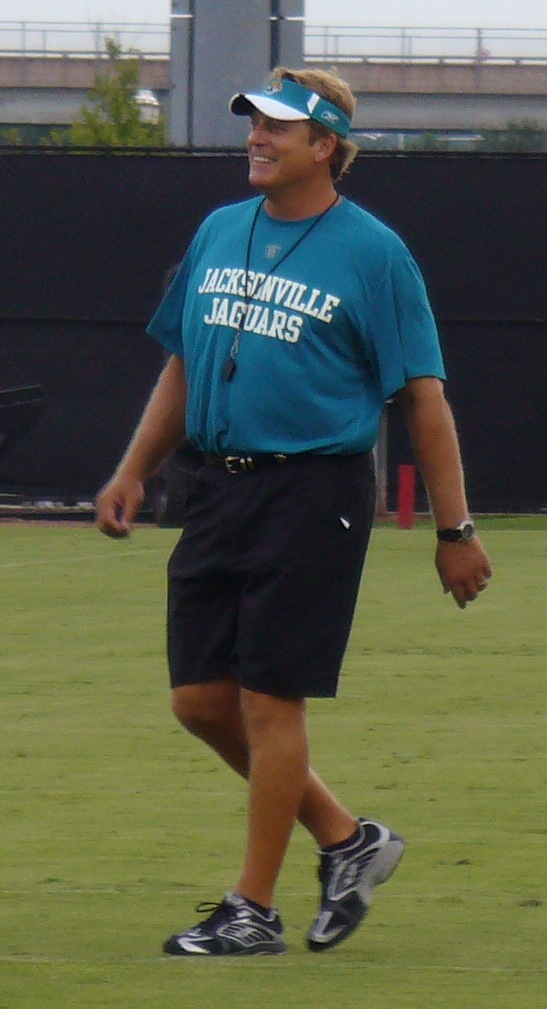
Head coach Jack Del Rio set an NFL-record for consecutive seasons (9) coaching a team without once winning a division title.

=== 2003–2005 ===
In 2003, the Jaguars hired Jack Del Rio as head coach. Del Rio was a linebacker during the late 80s and early 90s before retiring. He was formerly the Carolina Panthers' defensive coordinator, bringing the team's defensive ranking from 30th to second. Prior to that, Del Rio was the Baltimore Ravens linebackers coach, participating in that capacity on the Ravens' record setting championship 2000 defense. The Jaguars selected quarterback Byron Leftwich with the seventh pick of the NFL draft. The Jaguars had high hopes for their new quarterback. The team had many failures and heartbreaking moments, ending the 2003 season at 5–11 and missing the playoffs for the fourth consecutive season. Despite resolving their salary cap problems, the team's rebuilding was clearly taking longer than expected.

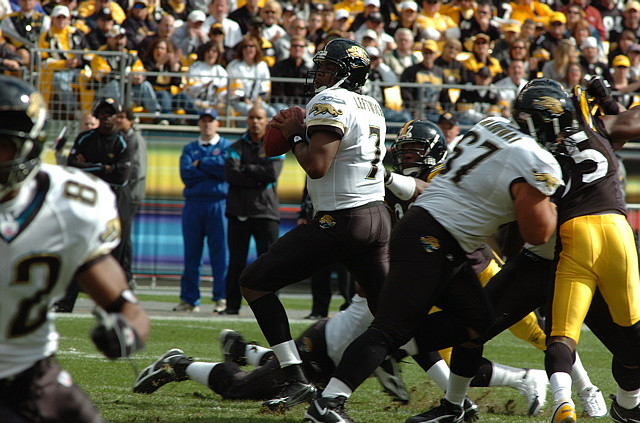
Byron Leftwich was the quarterback of the Jaguars from 2003 to 2006

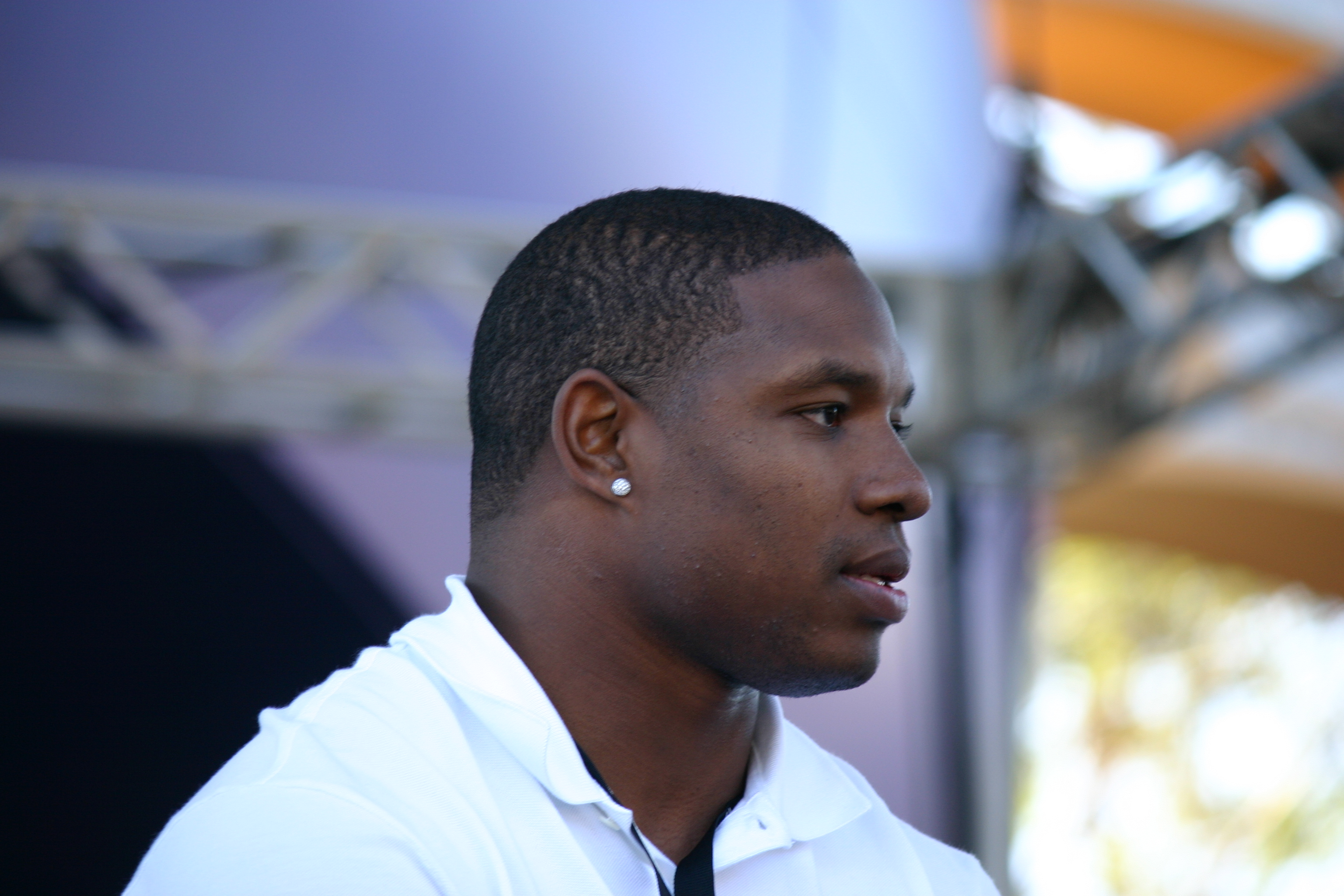
Maurice Jones-Drew, one of the league's smallest running backs turned out to be a second round steal for the Jags

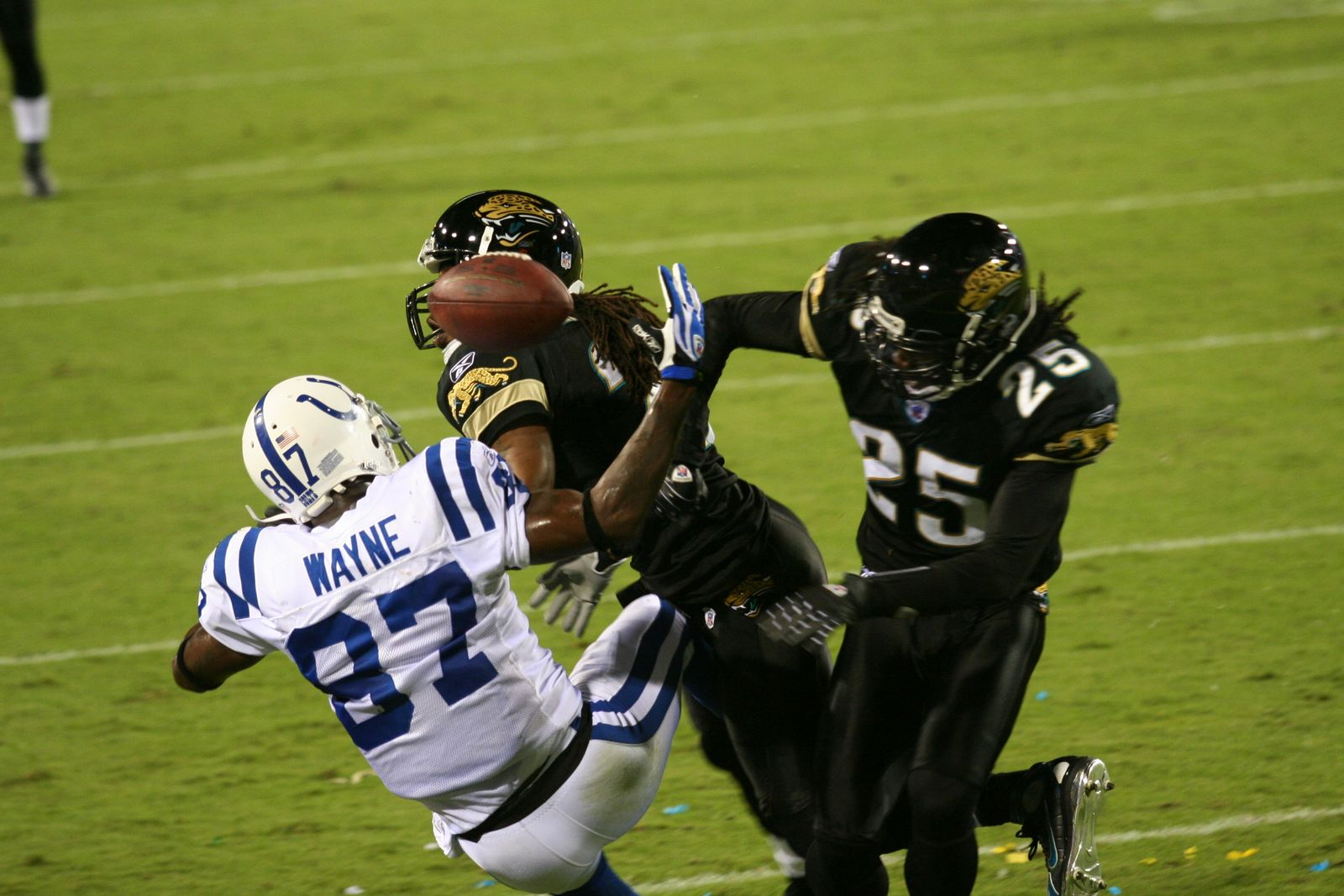
Reggie Nelson hitting Reggie Wayne of the Indianapolis Colts on Monday Night Football in 2007.

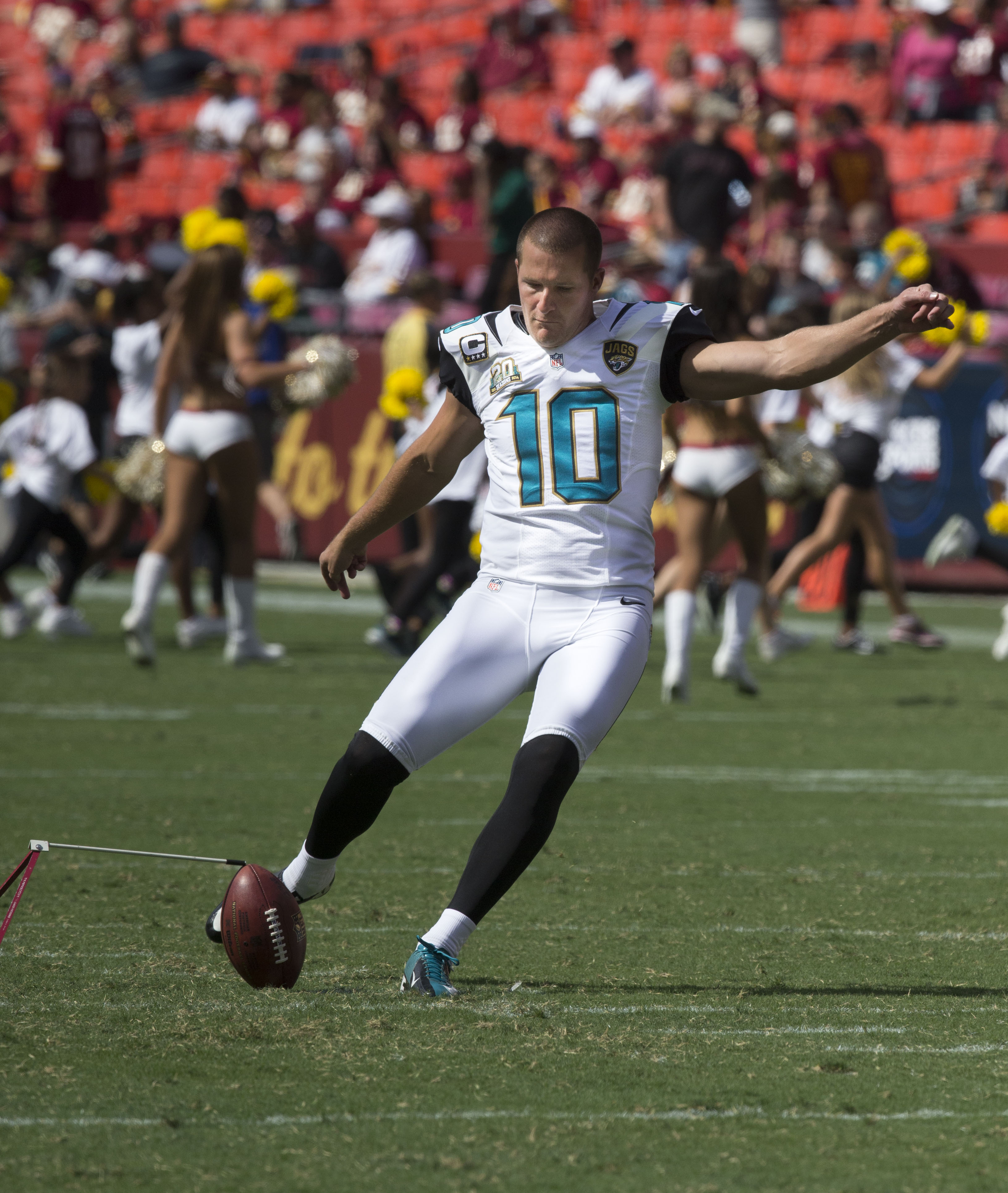
Josh Scobee is the all-time leading scorer for the Jaguars with 1,022 points.

The 2004 season, the 10th season of the Jaguars franchise, resulted in a 9–7 record, their first winning season since 1999, with road victories against the Green Bay Packers at Lambeau Field and the Indianapolis Colts at the RCA Dome. The Jaguars' defense was a strong suit, as it included two Pro Bowl players, defensive tackles Marcus Stroud and John Henderson. Josh Scobee was selected in the 5th round of the 2004 NFL draft and became a dominant placekicker for the Jaguars setting multiple franchise records. Byron Leftwich enjoyed a solid year in 2004, helped by strong performances from holdovers Fred Taylor and Jimmy Smith. Unfortunately, Taylor sustained a season-ending injury at Green Bay. The very next week the Jaguars fell to the Houston Texans, which would ultimately eliminate them from playoff contention.

The 2005 Jaguars hoped to challenge the Colts for the division title. However, due to their scintillating 13–0 start, including two victories against the Jaguars, the Colts easily clinched the AFC South title. With a 12–4 record, the Jaguars earned a wild card and their first playoff appearance since 1999. While the Jaguars managed to win key games in 2005, nine of their final ten games were against opponents with losing records. Though these games were wins, key players Byron Leftwich, Mike Peterson, Akin Ayodele, Paul Spicer, and Rashean Mathis were hurt during this stretch. The Jaguars ended the season losing 28–3 to the two-time defending champion New England Patriots on January 7, 2006, in the AFC wild card playoff round.

=== 2006 ===
Jacksonville looked like a team on the rise coming off of their 12–4 season, and was considered a playoff contender entering the season. But injuries plagued the team. Reggie Hayward, Greg Jones, Donovin Darius, Byron Leftwich, and Mike Peterson all suffered season-ending injuries. Marcus Stroud, Matt Jones, Paul Spicer, and Fred Taylor also faced injuries during the season. The team started off 2–0, defeating the Dallas Cowboys (earning the NFL's highest winning percentage on opening days at .750 with a record of 9–3), and shutting out the defending champs Pittsburgh Steelers. But the team lost its next two games, and suffered embarrassing losses to the Houston Texans over the course of the season (Jacksonville has struggled against the Texans since Houston entered the league in 2002). They missed the playoffs with an 8–8 record, but there were some positives, in particular an impressive rookie season by their second-round draft pick, running back Maurice Jones-Drew.

=== 2007 ===
In the 2007 NFL draft, the Jaguars used their first-round pick (21st overall) to select Florida safety Reggie Nelson. On June 15, 2007, the Jaguars released veteran strong safety Donovin Darius, who had seen diminished playing time in previous years due to mounting injuries. On August 31, 2007, the Jaguars announced that long time back-up quarterback David Garrard would start for the team, ahead of former first round draft pick Byron Leftwich, who was released in the team's final roster cuts. Garrard led the Jaguars to an 11–5 record and a wild card spot in the playoffs. The Jaguars defeated the Pittsburgh Steelers 31–29 to win their first playoff game in almost eight years and their first road playoff win since 1997. It was also the first time in the 50+ year history of the Steelers that they had been beaten twice at home by the same team in the same season. However, in the divisional round, the Jaguars fell to the then-undefeated New England Patriots; the teams were tied at halftime, but the Patriots pulled ahead and won 31–20. Tom Brady completed 26 of 28 passes in this game, being pressured by the Jaguars' defense only once, on the first play. This game, more than any other, gave the Jaguars' front office a strong desire to upgrade the pass rush during the offseason.

The team's offense in 2007 was largely a run-first offense, with Maurice Jones-Drew and Fred Taylor each putting up a lot of yards. David Garrard, however showed to be an efficient passer in 2007, throwing only 3 interceptions.

=== 2008 ===
The 2008 season began with high expectations for the Jaguars. The team acquired free agent wide receiver Jerry Porter and rookie defensive ends Quentin Groves of Auburn and Derrick Harvey of Florida to address the team's most glaring needs. (Porter was released the following year and Groves was traded to Oakland in 2010.) Journalists including ESPN.com's Kevin Seifert predicted the Jaguars were poised to make a Super Bowl run.

However, the Jaguars failed to live up to those expectations, struggling to a 5–11 finish, the franchise's worst record since 2003. The team's struggles were in part, the result of a rash of injuries to the team's offensive line. The Jaguars lost starting guards Vince Manuwai and Maurice Williams for the season within the first quarter of the opening game. Tackle Richard Collier's career ended in early September when he was brutally attacked and shot 14 times. Center Brad Meester missed the first two months of the season and guard Chris Naeole, signed to the roster mid-season in response to these injuries, was injured in pregame warmups before playing a single snap. The 2008 season marked the end of running back Fred Taylor's 11-year career as a Jaguar. Taylor, who is considered to be one of the greatest Jaguars in the history of the franchise, rushed for over 10,000 yards during his tenure with Jacksonville and earned one trip to the Pro Bowl. In 2009, he signed with the New England Patriots. Taylor's departure opened up the door for Maurice Jones-Drew to become the team's feature running back. In 2011, Taylor signed a one-day contract so he could retire as a Jaguar.

=== 2009–2010 ===
The Jaguars hoped to begin a new era in 2009 under their first-ever general manager, Gene Smith. Smith made his mark early on in the 2009 NFL draft by acquiring talent such as Eugene Monroe, Terrance Knighton, Derek Cox, Eben Britton and Mike Thomas, who all made significant contributions in their rookie years. The Jaguars finished off this season 7–9 and did not manage to make the playoffs. In the offseason, the Jaguars parted ways with veteran players John Henderson and Reggie Hayward as part of the team's "youth movement".

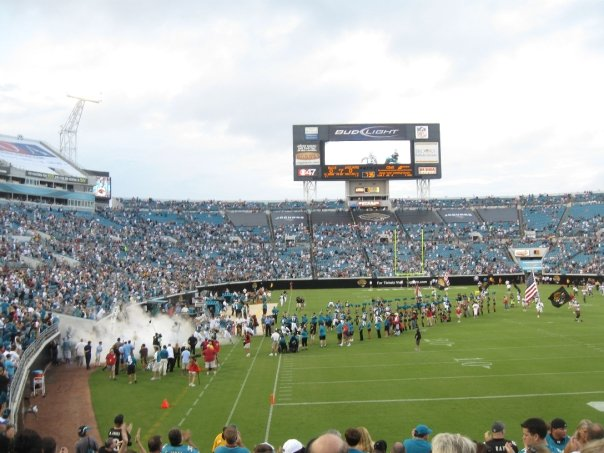
The Jaguars entrance during a 2009 preseason game.

However, 2009 also saw the team's attendance numbers plummet, leading to television blackouts and speculation that the team could eventually be moved or sold. 2009 marked a low point, with the team's attendance averaging around 50,000, causing seven of the eight home games to be blacked out, and leading NFL commissioner Roger Goodell to address the issue with owner Wayne Weaver. Jacksonville is one of the league's smallest markets, though its stadium is relatively large; since 2005 the team has covered nearly 10,000 of the stadium's 73,000 total seats with tarp in order to lower the stadium's official capacity to a more typical size and reduce blackouts. 73,000 total seats still ranks as one of the largest in the NFL. From 2008 the team further suffered from the late-2000s recession, which hit Florida particularly hard, and structural changes within the NFL that disadvantage teams in smaller markets.

In 2010, to address this issue, the team and the City of Jacksonville undertook several measures aimed at ensuring the franchise's continued viability in Jacksonville. Supporters began the "Team Teal" drive to drum up ticket sales. The city negotiated a five-year, $16.6 million naming rights deal with Jacksonville-based EverBank to rename the stadium EverBank Field. As a result, the Jaguars' attendance increased dramatically in 2010. While attendance figures were stagnant for most of the NFL, Jacksonville saw an increase of 36.5%, by far the highest in the league, and had none of their home games blacked out.

The 2010 season proved a big year for the Jaguars on the field as well. Running back Maurice Jones-Drew emerged as second in the league in rushing yards and David Garrard threw for 23 touchdowns, a franchise record. Marcedes Lewis went to his first Pro Bowl and the Jags had one of the best young defensive tackle pairs with Terrance Knighton and rookie Tyson Alualu. Josh Scobee set a team record with a 59-yard field goal to beat the Indianapolis Colts. Heading into December, Jacksonville was at the top of the AFC South and in playoff contention. In Week 15, they lost to Indianapolis, 34–24, which placed the Colts back atop the AFC South. The Jaguars lost their last two games, placing themselves out of playoff contention. They finished the season 8–8.

=== 2011 ===
In the 2011 NFL draft, the Jaguars traded a first and a second round pick in order to move up to the 10th pick and select Missouri quarterback Blaine Gabbert. On September 6, quarterback David Garrard was cut from the team just days before the start of the season and Luke McCown was named the team's starter. The move was similar to the one that named Garrard himself the starter over Byron Leftwich in 2007. McCown started two games until he threw four interceptions in a lopsided loss to the New York Jets and Blaine Gabbert was named the starter the following week. The Jaguars offense would continue to struggle under the rookie quarterback, losing the next 4 games in a row, until an upset victory over the Baltimore Ravens at home on Monday Night Football.

On November 29, owner Wayne Weaver announced the firing of head coach Jack Del Rio, whose record had been 3–8 through the first 12 weeks of the season and 68–71 over his 9-year tenure. Del Rio was succeeded by defensive coordinator Mel Tucker on an interim basis. Weaver also announced that General Manager Gene Smith had been given a three-year extension of his contract.

== Era of struggles: 2012–2020 ==
=== Shahid Khan purchases Jaguars ===
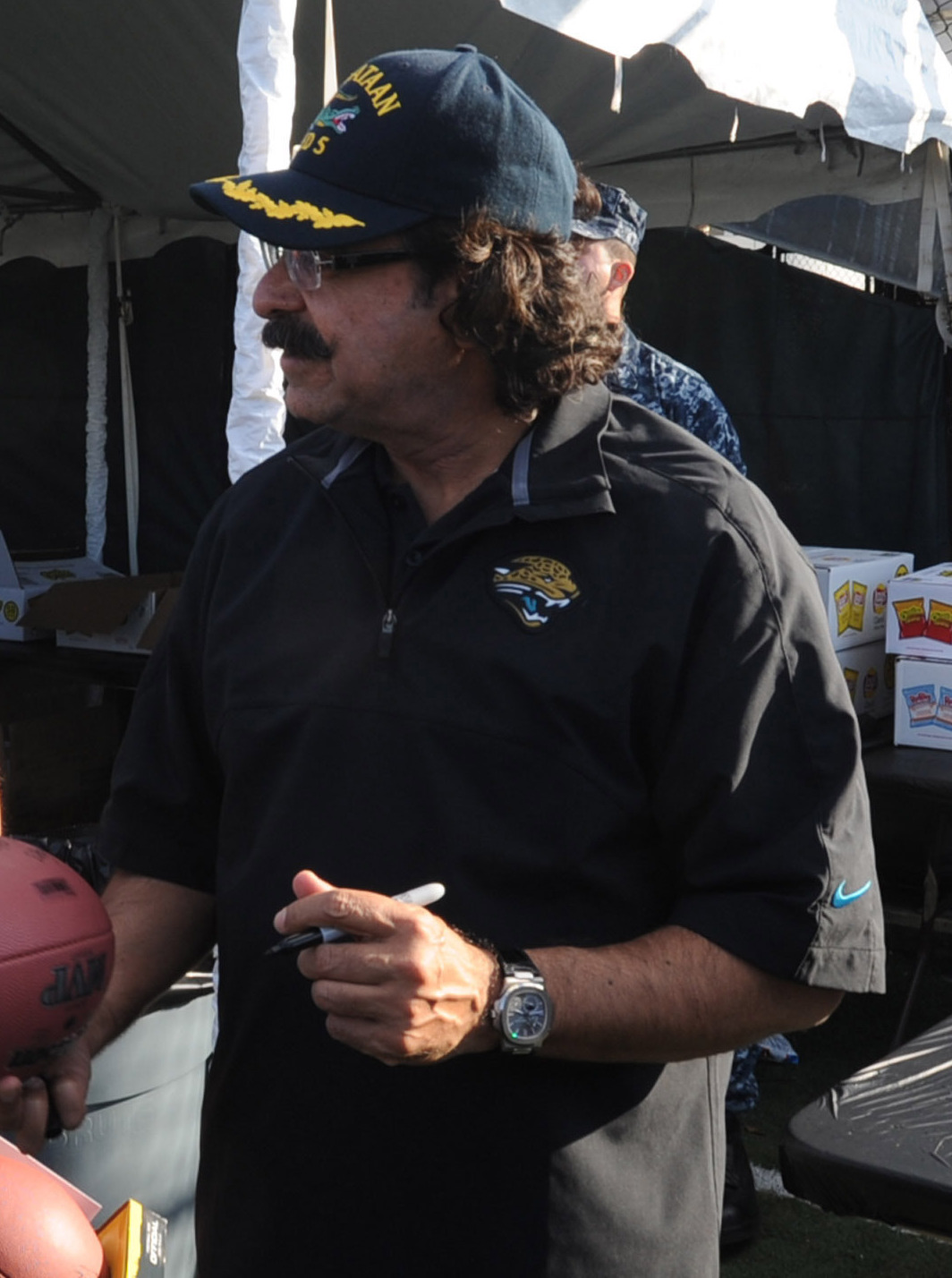
Businessman Shahid Khan purchased the Jaguars in 2012.

Immediately following the announcement of head coach Jack Del Rio being fired on November 29, 2011, Wayne Weaver announced that the team would be sold to Illinois businessman Shahid Khan. Khan's assumption of ownership was approved a couple of weeks later by the NFL team owners, and Khan took over full ownership on January 4, 2012. He immediately began the team's search for head coaching candidates.

=== Mike Mularkey era: 2012 ===
On January 10, former Atlanta Falcons offensive coordinator Mike Mularkey was named head coach of the Jaguars. On January 13, it was announced that interim head coach Mel Tucker would remain on the staff as defensive coordinator/assistant head coach and that former Falcons quarterbacks coach Bob Bratkowski would become offensive coordinator. On January 20, 2012, the team hired John Bonamego as special teams coordinator.

On February 13, 2012, the Jaguars hired MetLife Stadium president and CEO Mark Lamping as team president. Lamping also spent 13 years as the president of the St. Louis Cardinals. Lamping is the second team president in franchise history and the first since 1997, when David Seldin left that position.

The Jaguars began the 2012 season with a new coaching staff and a new owner. One of the main priorities of the new leadership was to improve the team's struggling receiving corps and see improvement from quarterback Blaine Gabbert after a disappointing rookie season. To do this, the team selected wide receiver Justin Blackmon in the first round of the 2012 NFL draft and acquired Laurent Robinson in free agency. Despite the changes, the team struggled mightily on both sides of the ball. The team finished with a 2–14 record, the worst in franchise history. Both general manager Gene Smith and head coach Mike Mularkey were fired shortly after the end of the season.

=== London Games ===
On August 21, 2012, the Jaguars announced they had finalized a deal to play one regular season home game each year between 2013 and 2016 at London's historic Wembley Stadium as part of the NFL London Games. The first of these games was against the San Francisco 49ers on October 27, 2013. This deal was later extended through 2020 when the Jaguars were due to host two London Games. However, due to cancellation of the 2020 games the Jaguars would play at Wembley annually only through 2019 and return to London in 2021 to play at Tottenham Hotspur Stadium. The Wembley deal was repeated between 2022 and 2024.

=== Gus Bradley era: 2013–2016 ===
==== 2013 ====
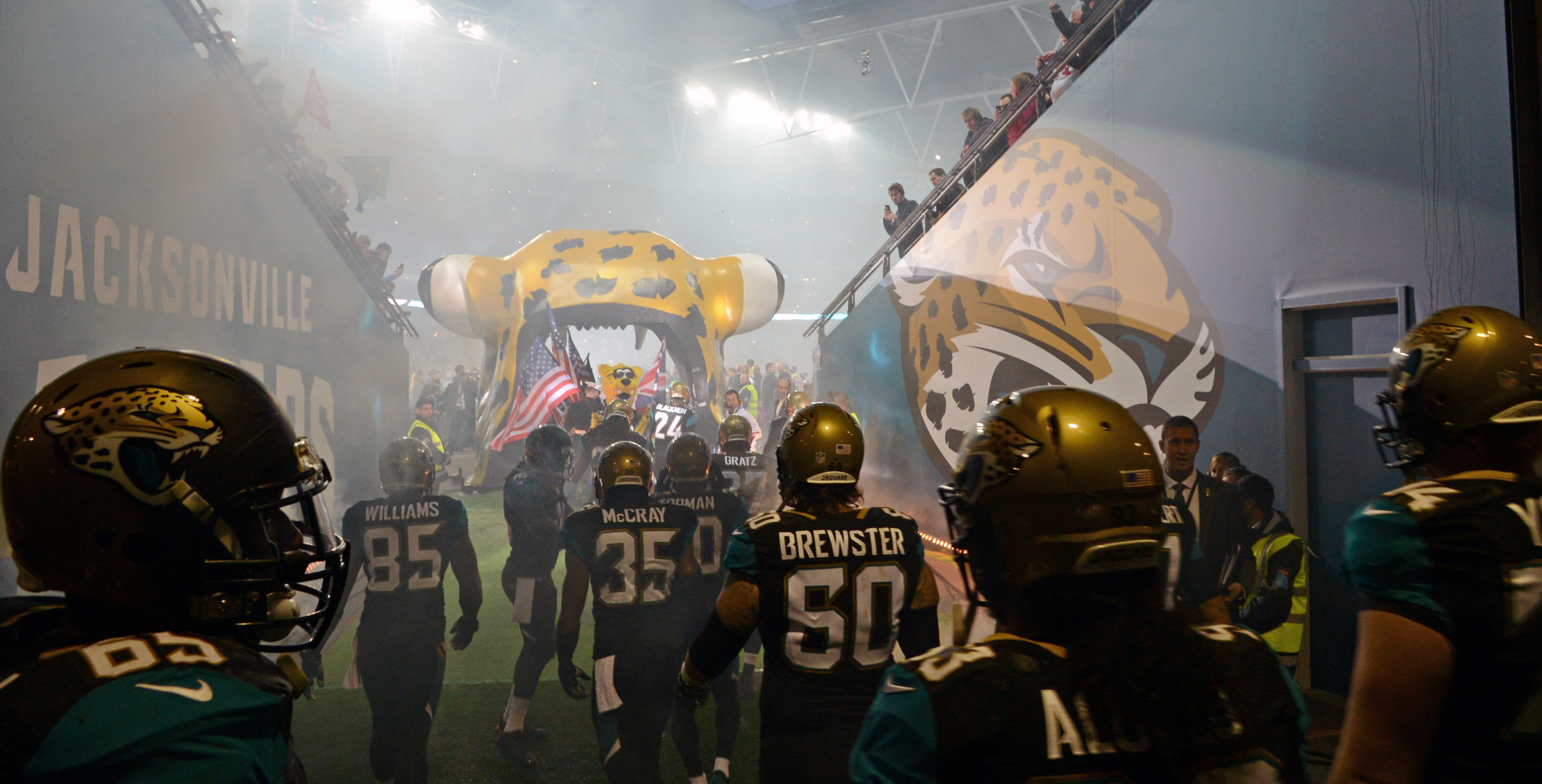
Jaguars take the field at their NFL International Series game at Wembley Stadium in London on October 27, 2013.

On January 8, former Atlanta Falcons Director of Player Personnel David Caldwell was hired as the second full-time General Manager in Jaguars history. He formerly served as a scout for the Indianapolis Colts for 10 years from 1998 to 2007. His first task with the team was to lead the interview process for a new head coach. Nine days later former Seattle Seahawks defensive coordinator Gus Bradley was named head coach of the Jaguars. The Jaguars struggled early on in 2013 and went into the bye week with an 0–8 record. On November 1, wide receiver Justin Blackmon was suspended indefinitely after violating the NFL's Policy and Program for Substances of Abuse. Despite the loss of Blackmon the Jaguars got their first win with Gus Bradley on November 10 with a 29–27 victory over the Tennessee Titans. This was followed by a respectable showing against the Arizona Cardinals, despite a 27–14 loss, and the Jaguars' second and third victory of the season against the Houston Texans and the Cleveland Browns. The Jaguars would win again the very next week against the Houston Texans 27–20 on Thursday night, improving to 4–9. They finished the season 4–12.

==== 2014–2015 ====
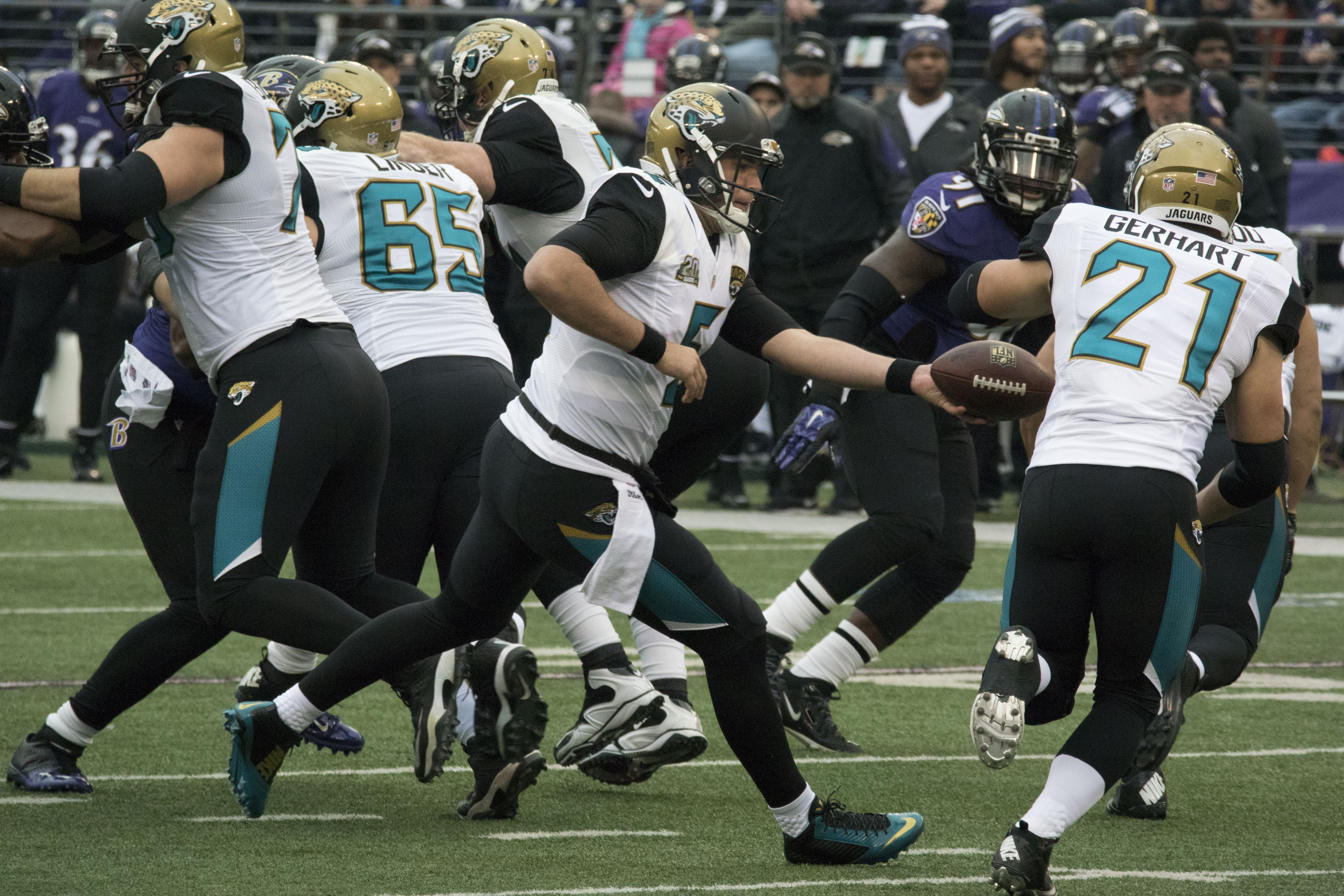
Blake Bortles handing off to Toby Gerhart in December 2014.

After finishing the 2013 season with a 4–12 record, a two-win improvement over the previous season, the Jaguars traded their 2011 NFL draft first round draft pick Blaine Gabbert to the San Francisco 49ers for the 6th round pick of the 2014 NFL draft. Maurice Jones-Drew, after 7 years with the Jaguars, also left the team and signed a three-year contract with the Oakland Raiders.

In the first round of the 2014 NFL draft the Jaguars selected quarterback Blake Bortles from University of Central Florida and then wide receiver Marqise Lee from University of Southern California in the second round. The new draft picks helped put more confidence in the struggling team. Justin Blackmon was suspended yet again for violating the NFL's Policy and Program for Substances of Abuse in July. Later in July, EverBank Field unveiled their two new endzone scoreboards, which are considered to be the world's largest. The Jaguars managed to end their season with a 3–13 record.

Dante Fowler was selected by the Jaguars as the third overall pick in the 2015 NFL draft. However, Fowler tore his ACL at rookie minicamp on May 8 and did not return for the 2015 season. Josh Scobee was traded to the Pittsburgh Steelers for a 2016 NFL draft sixth round pick. Jason Myers took over as the main placekicker for the Jaguars. The Jaguars finished the 2015 season with a record of 5–11, the team's fifth straight losing season and their eighth straight non-winning season.

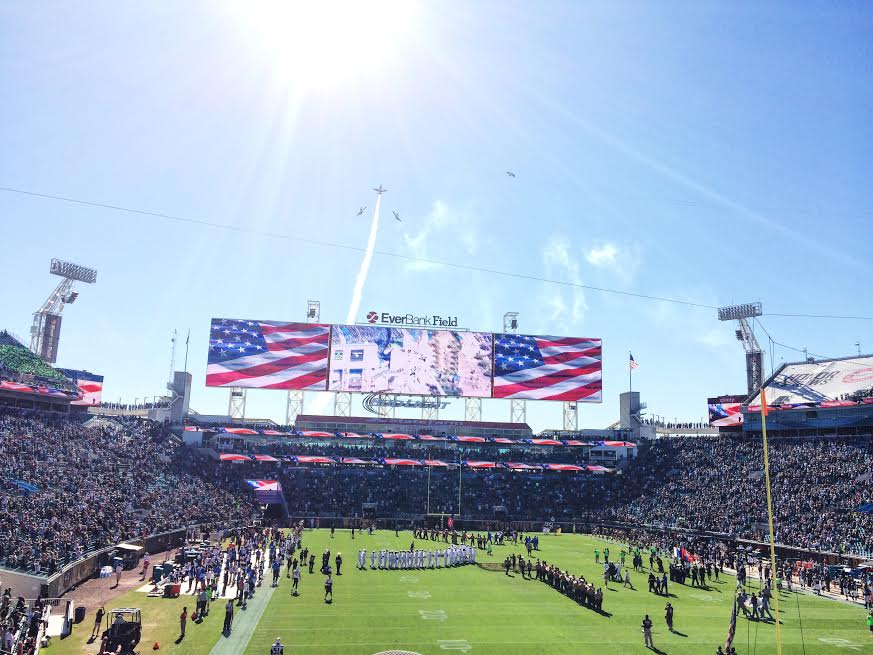
The Star-Spangled Banner performed before a Jaguars game at EverBank Field in 2015.

==== 2016 ====
With plenty of cap space to work with, Jacksonville splurged in free agency, adding defensive tackle Malik Jackson from the Denver Broncos and cornerback Prince Amukamara from the New York Giants. With the fifth selection, the Jaguars selected cornerback Jalen Ramsey from Florida State University in the first round and then the second round linebacker Myles Jack of UCLA in the 2016 NFL draft. Jack was considered to be a top-10 talent, but fell to the second round due to a knee injury. On October 2, 2016, the Jacksonville Jaguars defeated the Indianapolis Colts 30–27 in the NFL International Series game. On December 18, 2016, Gus Bradley was fired after the Jaguars' ninth loss in a row during the 2016 season. Bradley's win–loss record as head coach of the Jaguars was 14–48 in three seasons.

=== Doug Marrone era: 2016–2020 ===
==== 2017–2018 ====
On January 9, 2017, the Jaguars announced the interim head coach Doug Marrone was to be the new head coach, the contract of General Manager David Caldwell was to be extended and Tom Coughlin was returning to Jacksonville to become Executive Vice-president of Football Operations. Both Doug Marrone and David Caldwell would report to the Executive Vice-president Tom Coughlin.

In the first round of the 2017 NFL draft the Jaguars selected running back Leonard Fournette of LSU. At the annual NFL International Series in London on September 24, 2017, Jaguars players locked arms and kneeled during the national anthem in response to President Donald Trump's remarks on NFL players who kneel. Shahid Khan also participated with the Jaguars in locking arms during the anthem and the Baltimore Ravens kneeled on the opposite side of the field. The Jaguars went on to defeat the Ravens in a 44–7 win. Four weeks later on October 17, President of the Jaguars Mark Lamping sent a letter of apology to the director of military affairs and veterans in Jacksonville that says the Jaguars were ”remiss in not fully comprehending the effect of the national anthem demonstration on foreign soil has had on the men and women who have or continue to serve our country.”

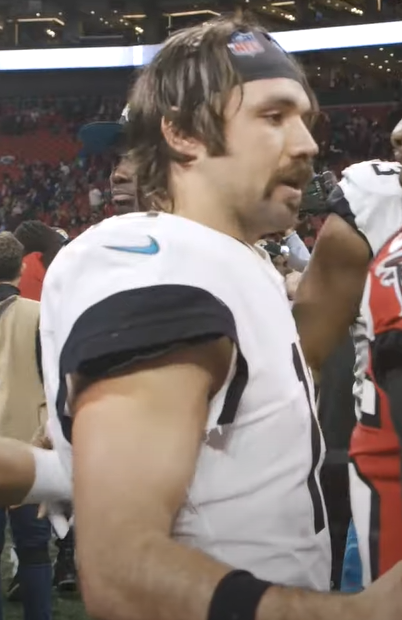
Gardner Minshew in 2019.

After their week 15 win over the Houston Texans, the Jaguars clinched their first playoff appearance since 2007; they finished the season 10–6, enough to win the division for the first time since 1999. It was a seven-game turnaround from the previous year. The Jaguars defeated the Buffalo Bills 10–3 in Jacksonville, marking their first playoff win in ten years. In the Divisional Round, on January 14, 2018, the Jaguars defeated the Pittsburgh Steelers 45–42 in Pittsburgh, their second win at Heinz Field that season, to advance to their 3rd AFC Championship Game, and their first in 18 years. After leading most of the game, they narrowly fell to the New England Patriots 24–20. For the season, the defense earned the nickname "Sacksonville" because of its dominance.

The following season, Jacksonville started strong with a 3–1 record through September, but lost ten of their remaining twelve games, including seven in a row, to falter to 5–11 and last place in the AFC South.

==== 2019 ====
In the first round of the 2018 NFL draft the Jaguars selected defensive tackle Taven Bryan of University of Florida and wide receiver D. J. Chark of LSU in the second round. The Jaguars traded Dante Fowler mid-season to the Los Angeles Rams for a 2019 third-round pick and 2020 fifth-round pick. On March 11, the Jaguars signed quarterback Nick Foles to a four-year, $88 million contract, making him their new starting quarterback and subsequently releasing Blake Bortles. For the first pick in the 2019 NFL draft the Jaguars selected linebacker Josh Allen.

On September 9, Foles broke his left clavicle in the season opener of 2019 leaving him out of action for the rest of the season. Gardner Minshew replaced Foles as the starting quarterback for the remainder of the season. The next day the Jaguars traded a fifth-round pick in the 2020 NFL Draft to the Steelers in return for quarterback Joshua Dobbs. On September 16, the Jaguars lost to the Houston Texas by one point. During the game, Jalen Ramsey and coach Doug Marrone got into a verbal confrontation. The next day Jalen Ramsey, who already had some frustration with the Jaguars in the past and escalating conflicts with the front office, requested to be traded and the Jaguars talked to teams the following week.

Since Gardner Minshew replaced Nick Foles as the starting quarterback he has garnered a following due to his mustache and performing on the field beyond expectations as a rookie quarterback. Minshew met Jon Gries, the actor that played Uncle Rico in Napoleon Dynamite, for a segment on ESPN. Minshew had regularly been compared to Uncle Rico due to his mustache.

On October 15, the Jaguars traded Ramsey to the Los Angeles Rams in exchange for a first round pick in the 2020 NFL draft, 2021 NFL draft and a fourth round pick in the 2021 NFL Draft. On December 18, the Jaguars fired executive vice president of football operations Tom Coughlin.

==== 2020 ====
On March 15, the Jaguars traded Calais Campbell to the Baltimore Ravens for a 5th round pick in the 2020 NFL draft. Three days later on March 18, the Jaguars traded Nick Foles to the Chicago Bears in exchange for a 4th round pick in the 2020 NFL Draft. On April 20, the Jaguars released Marqise Lee making him a free agent.

For their first pick of the 2020 NFL draft (9th overall), the Jaguars selected cornerback C. J. Henderson from the University of Florida. The Jaguars selected outside linebacker K'Lavon Chaisson from Louisiana State University as their second pick (20th overall) of the 2020 NFL Draft.

On August 30, the Jaguars agreed to trade Yannick Ngakoue to the Minnesota Vikings for a 2021 second-round draft pick and a conditional 2022 fifth-round draft pick that could go as high as a third-round pick. The following day on August 31 the Jaguars waived Leonard Fournette less than two weeks before the 2020 season opener.

On September 13, 2020, the Jaguars beat the Indianapolis Colts 27–20 to begin the season 1–0. After the game, the Jaguars' Twitter account tweeted "Not satisfied with 1-0", which would end up being heavily mocked as it was the only game the team would win in the 2020 season, and the last victory before a 20-game losing streak that lasted until October 17, 2021.

After losing 10 straight games in the 2020 season, the Jaguars fired General Manager Dave Caldwell on November 29. Throughout the 2020 season, Gardner Minshew struggled as the starting quarterback and was eventually replaced by Mike Glennon on December 27. Minshew returned to his previous position as the backup quarterback.

On January 4, 2021, head coach Doug Marrone was fired after ending the 2020 season with the worst record in franchise history at 1–15, and ultimately finishing with a 23–43 regular season record during his time in Jacksonville.

== Trevor Lawrence era: 2021–present ==
=== Urban Meyer era: 2021 ===
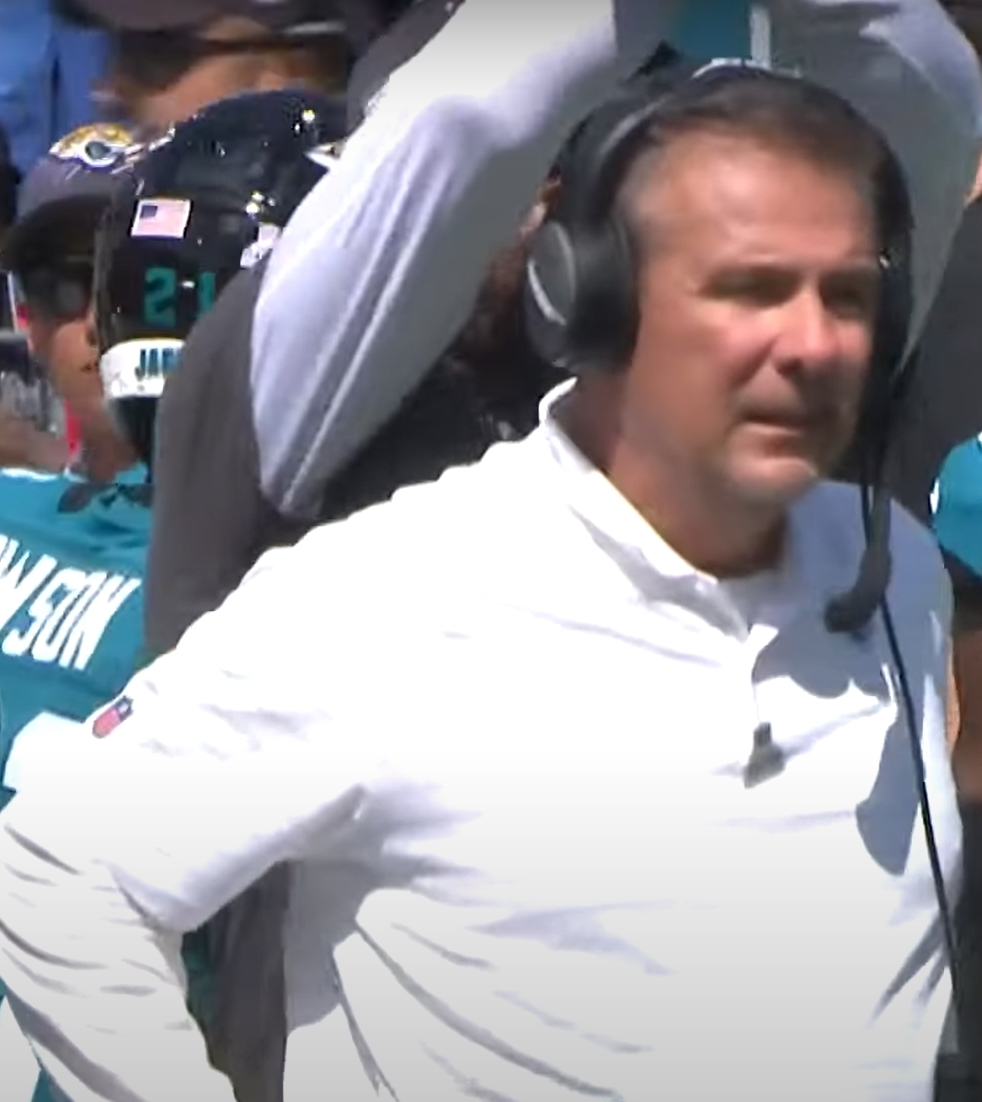
Urban Meyer on the sideline during a Jaguars game on October 10, 2021.

On January 14, 2021, Urban Meyer, former head coach of the Florida Gators and Ohio State Buckeyes, was chosen to be the next head coach of the Jaguars.

On February 11, 2021, Chris Doyle, the former strength coach at University of Iowa, was hired to be the director of sports performance on February 11, 2021. This was a highly criticized hiring due to Doyle's past conduct at University of Iowa involving accusations of racism and bullying. Doyle resigned amid backlash on February 13, 2021, two days after his hiring.

As the Jaguars' 1–15 record was the worst record of the 2020 NFL season, the Jaguars held the rights to the first overall pick of the 2021 NFL draft, which they used to select Clemson quarterback Trevor Lawrence. Lawrence faced incredibly high expectations upon his arrival in Jacksonville, as he had been closely followed by the media since his time in high school and was widely regarded as a potential generational talent.

On May 20, 2021, the Jaguars signed former Florida Gators and NFL quarterback Tim Tebow as a tight end. This transaction puzzled the NFL world as Tebow was 33 years old with no experience playing tight end, and had most recently played professional baseball as part of the New York Mets organization. The signing was ultimately assumed to be a result of the close relationship between Meyer and Tebow, as Meyer had been Tebow's coach at Florida. The Jaguars released Tebow on August 17, 2021.

On August 28, 2021, the Jaguars traded former starting quarterback Gardner Minshew to the Philadelphia Eagles for a conditional 2022 sixth-round pick, and Trevor Lawrence was officially named the starting quarterback.

Meyer's lack of professional coaching experience was immediately a source of turmoil for the team as it was reported that Meyer did not know how to handle losing and would become unhinged easily. During a week two loss against the Denver Broncos, Meyer joked to Broncos' head coach Vic Fangio that the NFL was like 'playing Alabama every week'. This comment caused Meyer to receive backlash as some said it proved his inexperience in professional coaching.

On September 26, 2021, in a loss against the Arizona Cardinals, Return specialist Jamal Agnew tied the record for the longest play in NFL history, when he returned a missed 68-yard field goal attempt by Matt Prater for a 109-yard touchdown.

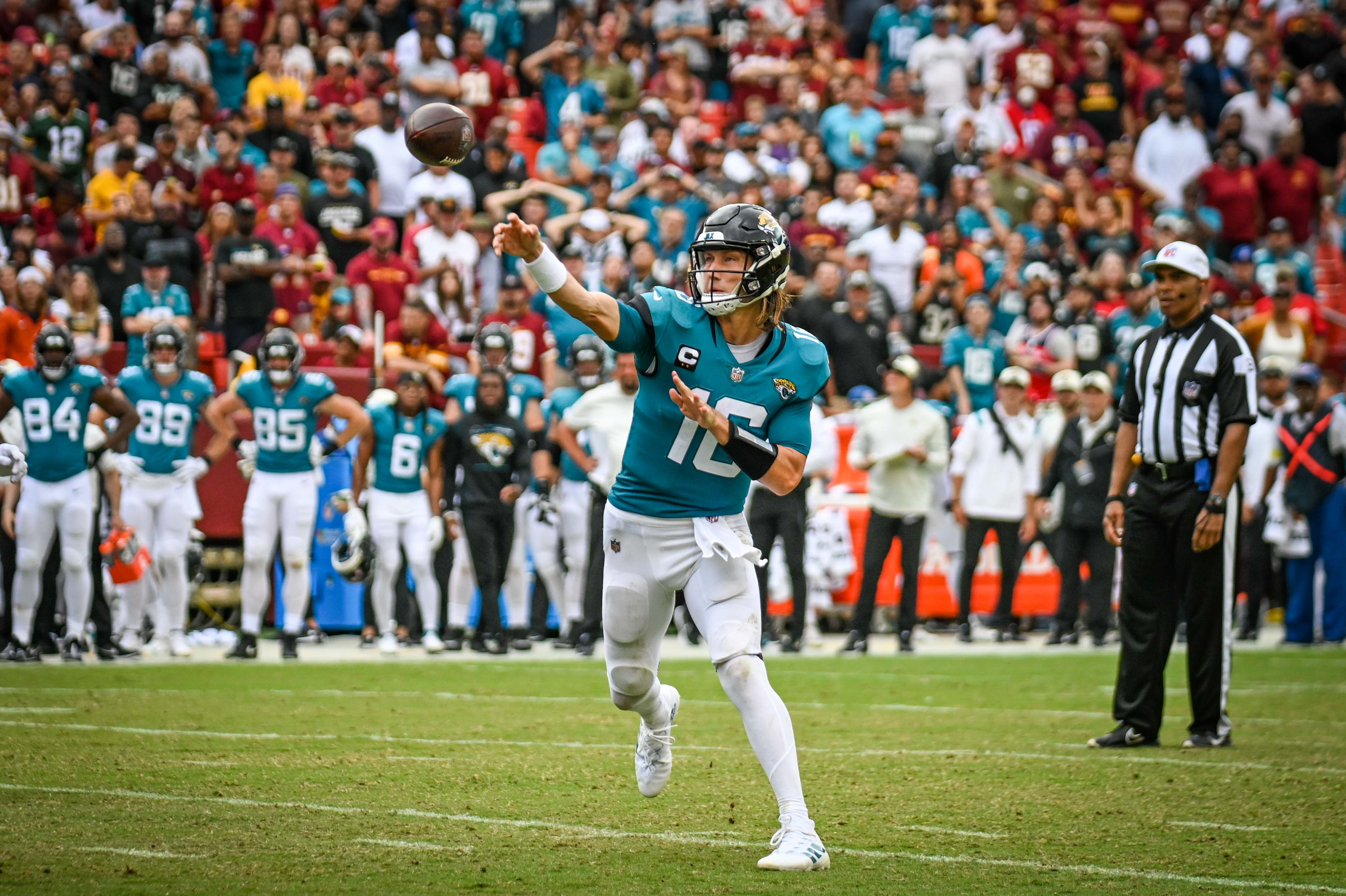
Trevor Lawrence throwing a pass to a receiver at FedEx Field on September 11, 2022.

On October 2, 2021, following a week four loss to the Cincinnati Bengals, a video of head coach Urban Meyer partying and inappropriately dancing with a younger woman who was not his wife in an Ohio bar went viral. Backlash ensued and Meyer's future in Jacksonville was seriously called into question as it was reported that Meyer had 'zero credibility' in the Jaguars' locker room, with players even subtly mocking him during practice. Ultimately, the team's morale plummeted due to locker room concerns and an 0–5 start to the season.

On October 17, 2021, in an NFL International Series game played in London, England, the Jaguars beat the Miami Dolphins 23–20 on a game-winning field goal by kicker Matthew Wright to improve to 1–5 on the season. This victory snapped the Jaguars' 20-game losing streak that dated back to September 13, 2020 – week one of the 2020 NFL season.

On December 16, 2021, the Jaguars fired Meyer as head coach due to reports of run-ins, inner turmoil among the staff and players throughout the season, and an assault allegation. Meyer was replaced by Darrell Bevell in an interim basis. The firing coincided with a 1–7 mark since the London game, and resulted in the Jaguars sitting at 2–11 entering Week 15. Meyer later said about his tenure with the Jaguars, "It was the worst experience I've had in my professional lifetime".

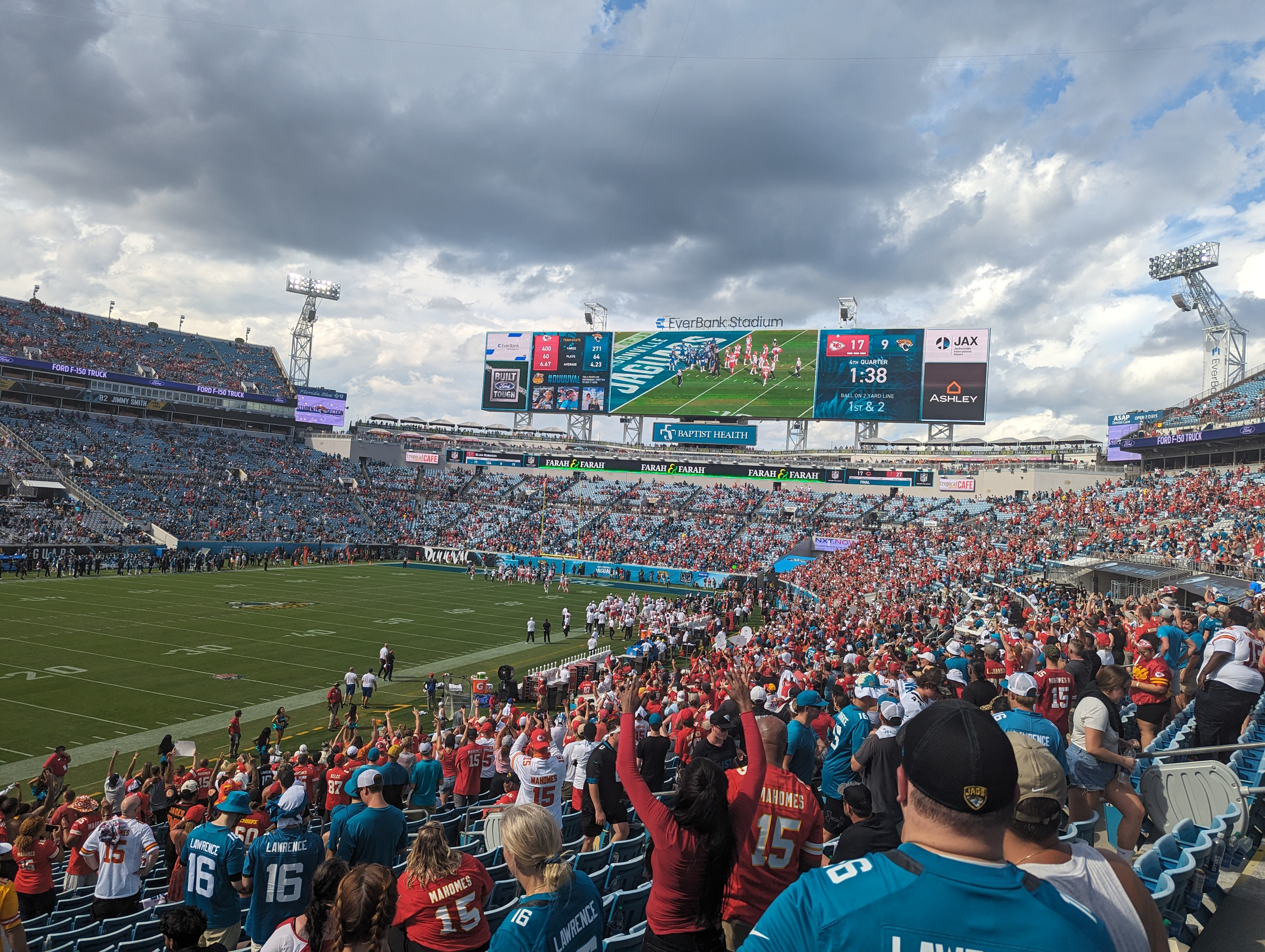
Kansas City Chiefs and Jacksonville Jaguars at EverBank Stadium in September 2023.

=== Doug Pederson era: 2022–2024 ===
On February 3, 2022, Doug Pederson, the former head coach of the Philadelphia Eagles, was hired to become the next head coach of the Jaguars. Pederson is the seventh permanent head coach and ninth overall head coach in franchise history. The Jaguars struggled at the beginning of the 2022 season but improved dramatically by winning the last five games and advancing to the 2022–23 NFL playoffs.

The Jaguars faced the Los Angeles Chargers in the Wild Card playoff game on January 14, 2023. In the first half, the Jaguars were down 27–0 with five turnovers. However, the Jaguars made a surprise comeback in the second half beating the Chargers 31–30 and advanced to the AFC Divisional Round. The Jaguars win in the second half marked the third largest comeback in NFL postseason history. Their season would end the following week with a 27–20 loss to the eventual Super Bowl LVII champion Kansas City Chiefs in the Divisional round.

In December 2023, it came to light that $22 million had been misappropriated in the Jacksonville back office. Over a four-year period, Amit Patel, an employee in charge of processing and classifying financial transactions such as team credit card usage, used his position to create fake transactions that flowed directly to him rather than team expenses, and spent it on gambling and cryptocurrencies. The organization had understaffed the finance office, so nobody was double-checking Patel's work.

The Jaguars started the 2023 season as favorites for the AFC South title. Following a 8–3 start, the Jaguars suffered a late-season collapse as they lost five out of their last six games, in part due to starting quarterback Trevor Lawrence playing through an injury sustained in the Week 13 loss against the Bengals. The offense also took a hit down the stretch when wide receiver Christian Kirk suffered a season-ending injury early in the game against the Cincinnati Bengals. Jacksonville would lose out on the AFC South division title and playoffs after a loss to the division rival Titans, leaving their divisional rivals, the Indianapolis Colts and the Houston Texans, in control of each other's destiny. With the Texans winning their final game against the Colts, Jacksonville ended the season in disappointment.

On November 17, 2024 the Detroit Lions defeated the Jaguars 52–6, the worst loss in franchise history.

The Jaguars would finish the 2024 season with a 4–13 record, and on January 6, 2025, they fired their head coach Doug Pederson, finishing his tenure with a 22–29 record overall. On January 22, the Jaguars fired general manager Trent Baalke.

=== Liam Coen era: 2025–present ===
On January 24, 2025, Liam Coen, the former offensive coordinator of the Tampa Bay Buccaneers, was hired to become the next head coach of the Jaguars. After defeating the Indianapolis Colts on December 7, the Jaguars became the leader of the AFC South at 9–4. The Jaguars then defeated the Tennessee Titans on January 4, 2026 to secure the AFC South title.
