= Shoe Station Group =

Footwear retailer in the United States

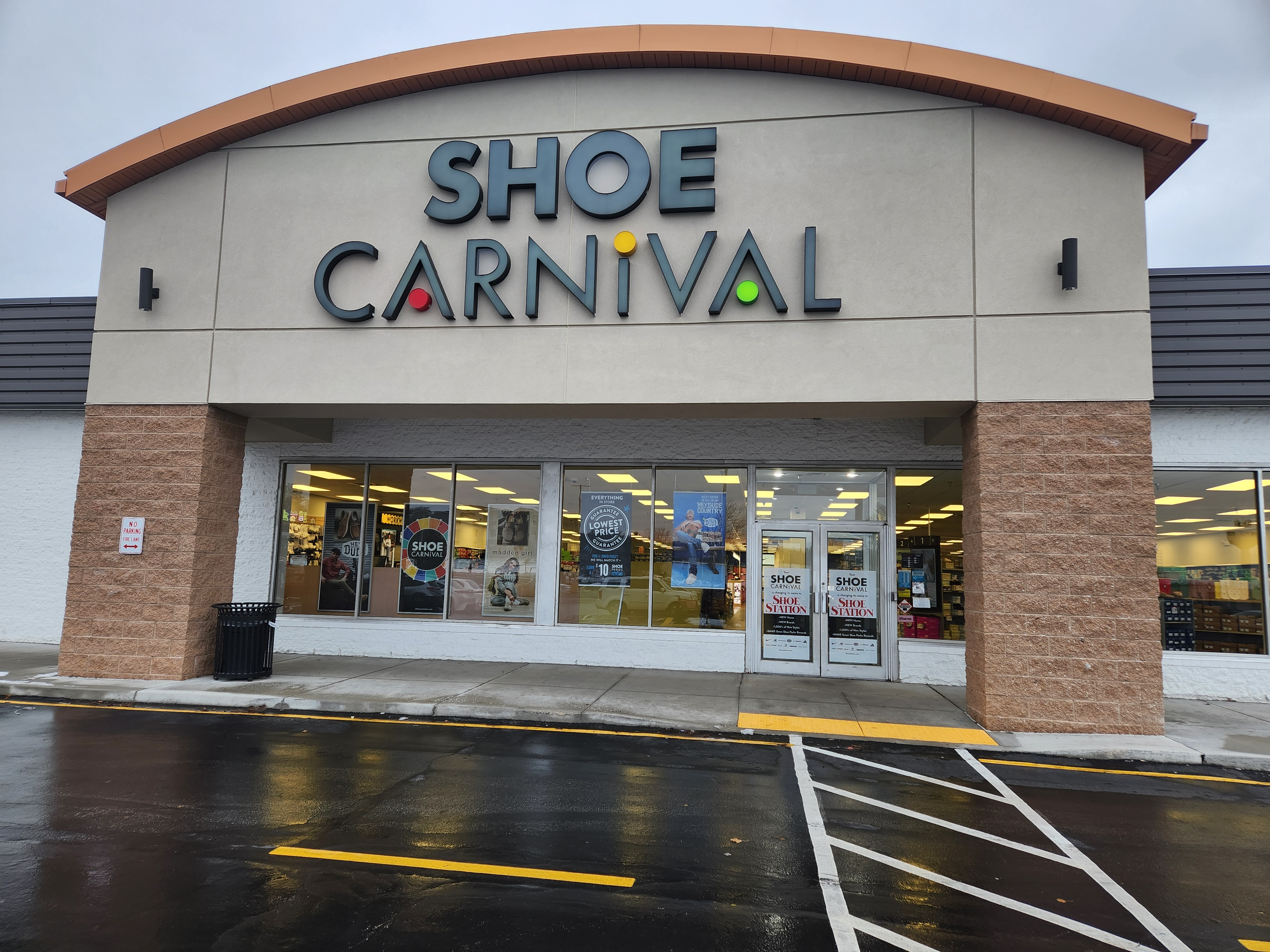
- A Shoe Carnival Store in Erie, PA
- Formerly: The Shoe Carnival (1982-1991)
- Type: Public
- Traded as: Nasdaq: SHOE
- Industry: Retail
- Founded: August 12, 1982; 44 years ago
- Headquarters: Fort Mill, South Carolina, United States
- Area served: United States
- Key people: J Wayne Weaver (chairman of the board); Cliff Sifford (Vice Chairman, Interim president and CEO); Timothy T. Baker (EVP, Store Operations); W. Kerry Jackson (EVP, CFO and Treasurer)
- Products: Apparel
- Revenue: $1.27 billion (2021)
- Number of employees: 5,443
- Website: www.shoestation.com

Shoe Station Group, Inc., formerly Shoe Carnival Inc., is an American retailer of family footwear. The company operates 422 stores across 35 states and Puerto Rico, consisting of 165 Shoe Station locations and 257 Shoe Carnival locations as of August 1, 2026. It was founded by David Russell in 1982 and is headquartered in Fort Mill, South Carolina as of 2025.

The company sells men's, women's, children's, and athletic footwear through its retail stores. Its stores also offer accessories such as handbags, wallets, shoe care items, and socks. The main difference in Shoe Carnival stores is its concept. The Shoe Carnival Concept is creating an urgency to buy through limited time promotions and the microphone. The mic person announces "specials" over the microphone. These specials include discount, product information, and fun specials which encourage customers to make a purchase.

== History ==
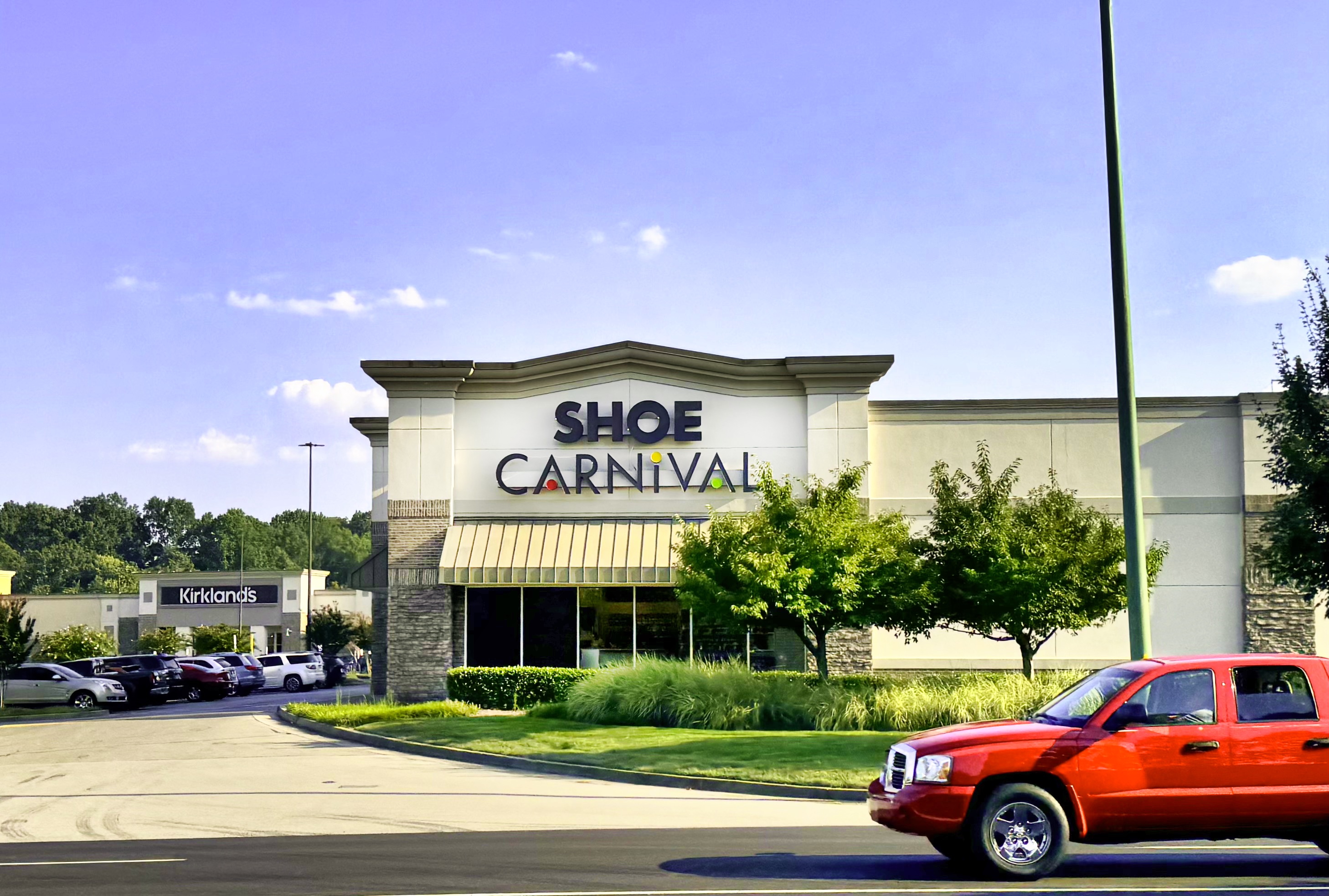
A Shoe Carnival Store in Farragut, Tennessee

=== Establishment ===
In 1978, the company that was to emerge as Shoe Carnival was established in Evansville, Indiana by founder David Russell, a single shoe store known as Shoe Biz.

Russell, through Shoe Biz Inc., would open the first Shoe Carnival on August 12, 1982, at Evansville's Eastland Place shopping center (since renamed Shoe Carnival Towne Center in 2011), which remains in operation as its flagship store. The store was successful in its local market and by 1986 had expanded to four stores. The Shoe Biz chain attracted the attention of a trio of shoe executives, Jerome "Jack" Fisher, Vince Camuto, and Wayne Weaver of Fisher-Camuto, forerunner of the brand Nine West. A sale was made to the Fisher-Camuto executives, with Russell remaining with his former company as an employee.

Fisher, Camuto, and Weaver unveiled a new retail "shoes & fashions" concept for the chain the following year, rebranding the flagship store as The Carnival in March 1987, and opening more stores with the new format. Expansion continued at a rapid pace, with the company growing to seven stores by the end of 1987.

In 1988, the company moved to the unitary ownership of Wayne Weaver, a former executive with the Wohl division of the St. Louis-based Brown Group, who bought out his associates Fisher and Camuto for just under $20 million. Together with original founder David Russell, Weaver continued on an aggressive expansion path, growing the chain to 39 stores by 1993. An IPO was then tendered, taking the company public on the NASDAQ stock exchange.

=== Carnival concept and merchandise emphasis ===
Shoe Carnival built its business by literally adopting a carnival concept, attempting to both entertain and motivate shoppers with loud up-tempo music, microphone operators announcing time-limited promotional offerings, and festive games such as spin-and-win wheels. A brightly painted Shoe Carnival bus and widely publicized grand opening events featuring celebrities and star athletes helped drive shopper enthusiasm for the chain. Confetti and a neon-dominated decor further emphasized the festival atmosphere of shopping at the store.

The company placed significant emphasis on private-label brands through the 1990s, hitting lower price points in competition with such national chains as Payless Shoe Source. This began to change in 1997 when department store veteran Cliff Sifford was added as General Merchandise Manager, with the company consciously attempting to become more "upmarket" through a new emphasis on branded footwear. By 1997, the "The Carnival" concept would be retired, and the company would open its 92nd store.

=== New approach ===
In 2002, Shoe Carnival rolled out a new, more subdued logo and toned down the circus-inspired look of its stores.

In 2006, the company began construction on a $40 million corporate headquarters and distribution center. Shoe Carnival's headquarters are now located in a new 60,000-square-foot (5,600 m^{2}) building at Cross Pointe Commerce Center on the east side of Evansville. The company's 410,000-square-foot (38,000 m^{2}) distribution center was built on Indiana 57 near Interstate 164 (Now Interstate 69) 5 miles northeast of the city.

The company moved to online sales in 2012, by which time 352 stores were in operation, predominantly in the Midwest. In October of that same year, General Merchandise Manager Sifford was promoted to chief executive officer when former CEO Mark Lemond, who had been with the company since 1987, stepped down for health reasons. Mark J. Worden later took over as CEO in September 2021.

Shoe Carnival launched a program called Shoes2U in 2015, allowing shoppers to receive styles and sizes of shoes from other stores in the Shoe Carnival chain through home delivery. Together with further expansion to more than 400 retail stores, this e-commerce initiative lead to the company reaching the $1 billion mark in total sales for the year 2016.

During the first half of fiscal 2018 the company reported $525.8 million in sales, a gain of $37.4 million from the previous year. Sales from comparable stores (omitting internet sales and sales through new stores) increased about 4 percent for that six-month period.

According to Chief Financial Officer Kerry Jackson, speaking to Footwear News in 2018 digital sales were the fastest-growing part of Shoe Carnival's business, with the company making a concerted effort to expand its presence among internet shoppers.

In February 2026, Mark J. Worden departed from his CEO position and resigned as a member of the Board of Directors. Cliff Sifford, the Vice Chairman of the Board and former CEO of Shoe Carnival, was named interim president and CEO while the company searches for a permanent successor.

The company's majority owner is J. Wayne Weaver, former owner of the Jacksonville Jaguars.

=== Acquisitions ===
On December 3, 2021, Shoe Carnival announced it had acquired substantially all of the assets of privately held, family-owned Shoe Station, Inc., which operates 21 stores in five Southern states, for $67 million in cash. Shoe Station was founded by Terry S. Barkin in 1984. The addition of a new brand and new retail locations to the Shoe Carnival portfolio creates a retail platform to serve a broader customer base with shoppers in both urban and suburban demographics. With the addition of Shoe Station to the Shoe Carnival portfolio, the Company expects to surpass 400 stores by the end of 2022, on a path to double-digit new store growth in the years ahead.

On February 13, 2024, Shoe Carnival announced the acquisition of Rogan's Shoes, a privately held retailer with 28 stores in Wisconsin, Minnesota, and Illinois, for $45 million in cash. The existing Rogan's stores will feature the combined name of "Rogan’s Shoe Station".

Shoe Carnival moved its corporate headquarters to Fort Mill, South Carolina, in 2025. In conjunction with the relocation, Shoe Carnival launched a significant rebranding initiative, transitioning many of its traditional stores to the Shoe Station brand. This strategy aims to cater to a higher-income demographic and streamline operations, with plans to operate over 90% of its fleet as Shoe Station entities by the end of fiscal 2028. The decision reflects a broader attempt to revitalize the brand amid challenges in the family footwear retail sector, particularly focusing on operational efficiencies and cost savings.

At the end of Fiscal 2025, Shoe Carnival had completed rebannering of 144 total Shoe Carnival stores, representing 34% of all company stores. Shoe Station noted significant variability in in-store performance across rebannered stores. Due to this result, Shoe Station has slowed rebannering for Fiscal 2026.
