= Rogen =

Rogen may refer to:

- Rogen (lake), a lake on the border of Sweden and Norway

== People with the name ==
- Rogen Ladon (born 1993), Filipino amateur boxer
- Lauren Miller Rogen (born 1981), American actress, screenwriter, and director
- Seth Rogen (born 1982), Canadian-American actor, comedian, and filmmaker

== See also ==
- Roggen, surname
- Rogan, surname
- Rogin, surname
