= John Rogan (disambiguation) =

John Rogan (1868–1905) was the second tallest person in history and the tallest person of African descent.

John or Johnny Rogan may also refer to:

- John Rogan (actor) (1938–2017), Irish actor
- John Rogan (Canadian football) (born 1960), Canadian football player
- John P. Rogan, American archaeologist
- Johnny Rogan (1953–2021), English author
- John "Jack" Rogan, founder of Rogan's Shoes
