= Rogin =

Rogin is a surname. Notable people with the surname include:

- Josh Rogin, American journalist
- Leo Rogin (1893–1947), American economist and economic historian
- Michael Rogin (1937–2001), American political scientist

== See also ==
- Fred Roggin (born 1957), American sports anchorman
- Rogan, surname
- Rogen § People with the name
