= Roggan River, Quebec =

Coordinates: 54°24′N 79°27′W

Roggan River is a small village in Northern Quebec, Canada, situated on the Roggan River along a peninsula at the edge of James Bay and Hudson Bay.
