= Wayne Weaver =

American businessman (born 1935)

- Born: January 14, 1935 (age 91); Columbus, Georgia, U.S.
- Education: University of Florida
- Occupations: Chairman of footwear store Shoe Carnival, former majority owner of Jacksonville Jaguars
- Spouse: Delores Barr Weaver
- Children: 2

J. Wayne Weaver (born January 14, 1935) is an American businessman. He owns the Evansville, Indiana-based Shoe Carnival shoe store chain and White Plains, New York-based Nine West fashion retailer, and was the first owner of the Jacksonville Jaguars of the National Football League (NFL) from 1993 to 2011.

== Biography ==
Weaver was born in Columbus, Georgia. He worked his way up the corporate ladder at the St. Louis-based clothing company, Brown Group, Inc. In 1978, Weaver founded his own shoe corporation, which he sold in the 1990s.

=== Marriage ===
Wayne Weaver met Delores Barr when she worked at his mother's dress shop; they married in 1955. In a 1998 interview, Wayne Weaver stated, "The thing I admire most about my wife is her passion for wanting to change the world. She believes down in the depth of her soul that she can make the world a better place." Wayne and Delores have two children, son Brian Weaver, and daughter Leigh Weaver-Sutton and two grandchildren.

She is chairman and CEO of the Jaguars Foundation, which grants over $1 million annually to organizations that assist "economically and socially disadvantaged youth and families", according to the foundation's mission statement. Delores Weaver was honored in 2002 with the Community Leadership Award by FBI then-Director Robert Mueller. She was also named, Children's Champion 2007 by Episcopal Children's Services in recognition of her years of leadership at the Jaguars Foundation that have had a profound impact upon Jacksonville youth. The honor was created in 2006 to recognize a Jacksonville resident who has committed their time and resources to help First Coast children.

They were honored with the River Advocate Award from the St. Johns Riverkeeper at Mayor John Peyton's Environmental Luncheon on April 3, 2009.

== Jacksonville Jaguars ==
Weaver was the leader of the ownership group that in 1993 won rights to an NFL expansion team, the Jacksonville Jaguars. The league had previously asked him to own a team in St. Louis, but Weaver believed the city preferred the St. Louis Cardinals to football.

On November 29, 2011, Weaver announced he and his partners would sell their interest in the Jaguars to businessman Shahid Khan. The majority share in the Jaguars was sold for $760 million. The sale was unanimously approved by the NFL owners on December 14, 2011 and was finalized on January 4, 2012.

On January 1, 2012, Weaver and his wife Delores were inducted into the Pride of the Jaguars in their final game as owners. The Jaguars defeated the Indianapolis Colts 19–13.
