= Roggen =

Roggen is a surname. Notable people with the name include:

- Ane Carmen Roggen (born 1978), Norwegian jazz singer
- Ida Roggen (born 1978), Norwegian jazz singer
- Live Maria Roggen (born 1970), Norwegian jazz singer
- Vibeke Roggen (b. 1952), Norwegian philologist

== See also ==
- George Van Roggen (1921–1992), Canadian Senator and free trade advocate
- Rogen (disambiguation)
