= Fred Taylor (running back) =

American football player (born 1976)

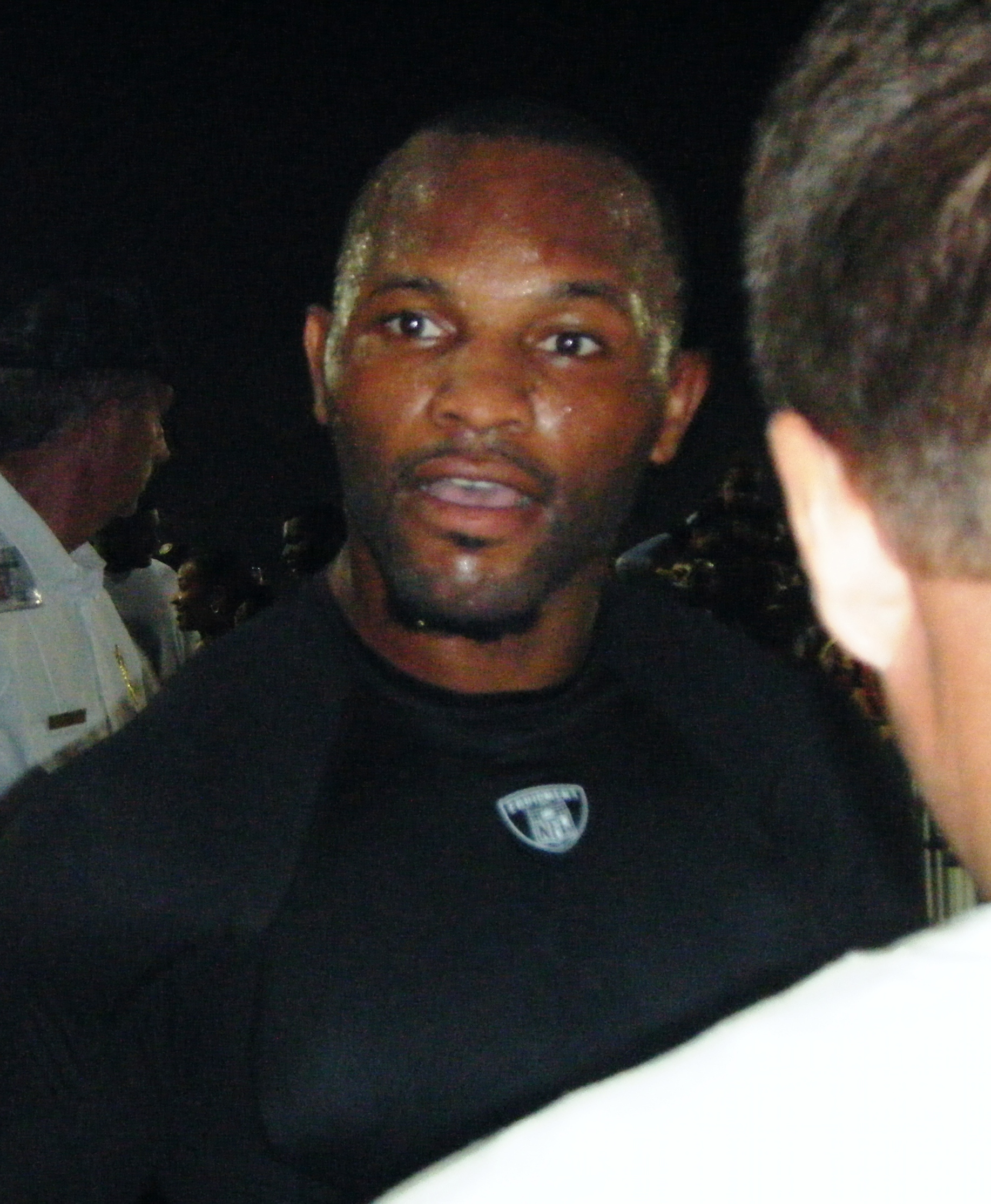
- Taylor in 2008

No. 28, 21
- Position: Running back

Personal information
- Born: January 27, 1976 (age 50); Pahokee, Florida, U.S.
- Listed height: 6 ft 1 in (1.85 m)
- Listed weight: 228 lb (103 kg)

Career information
- High school: Glades Central (Belle Glade, Florida)
- College: Florida (1994–1997)
- NFL draft: 1998: 1st round, 9th overall pick

Career history
- Jacksonville Jaguars (1998–2008); New England Patriots (2009–2010)

Awards and highlights
- Second-team All-Pro (2007); Pro Bowl (2007); PFWA All-Rookie Team (1998); Pride of the Jaguars; Bowl Alliance national champion (1996); Third-team All-American (1997); First-team All-SEC (1997); Florida–Georgia Hall of Fame; University of Florida Athletic Hall of Fame

Career NFL statistics
- Rushing yards: 11,695
- Rushing average: 4.6
- Rushing touchdowns: 66
- Receptions: 290
- Receiving yards: 2,384
- Receiving touchdowns: 8
- Stats at Pro Football Reference

Frederick Antwon Taylor (born January 27, 1976) is an American former professional football player who was a running back in the National Football League (NFL) for 13 seasons from 1998 to 2010. He played college football for the Florida Gators and was selected by the Jacksonville Jaguars ninth overall in the 1998 NFL draft. Taylor played for the Jaguars and New England Patriots and is a member of the 10,000 yard rushing club. He is a co-host of The Pivot Podcast with friends, Channing Crowder and Ryan Clark.

== Early life ==
Taylor was born on January 27, 1976, in Pahokee, Florida. He attended Glades Central High School in Belle Glade, Florida, where he was a standout high school football player for the Glades Central Raiders. He was also a letterman in track. Taylor initially played linebacker, but switched to running back as a junior. As a senior, he ran for 1,700 yards and 22 touchdowns, including a 301-yard, 5-touchdown outing. He received Florida "Super Senior" and all-state honors. In 2007, 13 years after he graduated from high school, the Florida High School Athletic Association (FHSAA) recognized Taylor as one of the "100 Greatest Players of the First 100 Years" of Florida high school football.

In track & field, Taylor competed as a sprinter. He recorded personal-bests of 10.85 seconds in the 100 meters and 22.32 seconds in the 200 meters. He was also a member of the 4 × 100 m (42.05 seconds) relay team.

== College career ==
Taylor accepted an athletic scholarship to attend the University of Florida in Gainesville, where he played for coach Steve Spurrier's Gators from 1994 to 1997. Taylor started two games as a true freshman, picking up 873 yards and eight touchdowns. As a sophomore in 1995, he played in six games, gaining 281 yards and scoring five touchdowns. Taylor returned in 1996 to start two of the seven games he played, running for 629 yards and five touchdowns, and helping the 12–1 Gators win the national championship. As a senior team captain in 1997, Taylor was the team's leading rusher with 1,292 yards on 214 carries and scoring 13 touchdowns, earning first-team All-Southeastern Conference (SEC) recognition and Associated Press third-team All-American honors, and was chosen by his teammates as the Gators' most valuable player. He finished his college career ranked fourth in school history with 3,075 yards and 31 touchdowns.

In one of a series of articles about the top 100 Gators from the first 100 seasons of Florida football, The Gainesville Sun sports editors ranked Taylor as the No. 36 all-time greatest Gator. He was inducted into the Florida–Georgia Hall of Fame in 2008, and the University of Florida Athletic Hall of Fame as a "Gator Great" in 2010. Taylor completed his final class on-line for his degree in sociology and graduated from Florida in the May 2024 commencement ceremony.

== Professional career ==
Pre-draft measurables
Height	Weight	Arm length	Hand span	40-yard dash	Bench press
5 ft 11 7/8 in (1.83 m)	226 lb (103 kg)	32 1/2 in (0.83 m)	9 5/8 in (0.24 m)	4.29 s	20 reps
All values from NFL Combine/Pro Day

=== Jacksonville Jaguars ===
Taylor was selected ninth overall in the 1998 NFL draft by the Jacksonville Jaguars with the first of two picks they acquired in a trade with the Buffalo Bills in exchange for quarterback Rob Johnson. Taylor started 12 of 15 games for the Jaguars as a rookie in 1998, rushing for 1,223 yards and 14 touchdowns, the latter total a career-high, while also catching 44 passes for 421 yards and three touchdowns.

In 1999, Taylor played in ten games, starting nine, missing six due to a hamstring injury. He ranked second on the team with 732 yards, but posted two 100-yard rushing performances in the playoffs. Taylor also recorded the longest run in playoff history with a 90-yard touchdown run in a 62–7 win over Miami. He missed three and a half games in 2000, but still finished sixth in the NFL with 1,399 rushing yards and 12 touchdowns, while making 36 catches for 240 yards for another two touchdowns. Taylor played in the first two games of 2001 before suffering a groin injury and missing the rest of the season.

Overall, injuries caused Taylor to miss 23 out of a potential 48 games from 1999 to 2001. Fans and media were highly critical of Taylor's tendency to get injured, questioning his toughness and donning him the moniker "Fragile Fred", which deeply upset him, as he would later admit. Despite knowing that Taylor's season was over in Week 3 of 2001, Jaguars coach Tom Coughlin listed him on the injury report as "questionable" every game for the remainder of the season, further fueling the doubts of Taylor's toughness in the minds of fans. He still has not completely rid himself of the stigma and the nickname.

Following the 2001 season, it was alleged that Taylor's agent William "Tank" Black had stolen between $12 million and $14 million from players he had represented, and that Black had laundered nearly all of Taylor's $5 million signing bonus, the only guaranteed money in his rookie contract. In an interview with Vic Ketchman of Jaguars.com in November 2007, Taylor admitted he seriously considered retiring from football early in his career, because of the difficulties he experienced with injuries and Tank Black.

In 2002, Taylor rebounded to start all 16 games for the Jaguars, finishing the season with 1,314 yards, third most in team history, while setting a then-team record with 1,722 yards from scrimmage. He also set a career-high with 49 receptions, second-highest on the Jaguars, for 408 yards, and also recorded eight touchdowns. He again started all 16 games for the Jaguars in 2003 and set a career-high with 1,572 yards on 345 carries for six touchdowns. He also caught 48 passes for 370 yards. In 2004, Taylor started the first 14 games of the season, recording 1,224 yards and two touchdowns. His streak of 46 consecutive starts ended when a knee injury sidelined him for the final two weeks of the season.

Injuries hampered Taylor again in 2005, as he started 11 games while missing five games with injuries throughout the season. He still led the team with 787 yards rushing while also recording three touchdowns. In 2006, Taylor was joined in the Jaguars backfield by Maurice Jones-Drew, the Jaguars' second-round pick in the 2006 NFL draft and Taylor's eventual replacement. Despite sharing carries throughout the season, Taylor started 15 games and posted a 5.0 yard-per-carry average with 1,146 yards on 231 carries for five touchdowns. He also added 23 receptions for 242 yards and one touchdown. Together, Taylor and Jones-Drew combined for 2,087 yards, the most by two rushers in Jaguars history.

As a team captain in 2007, Taylor rushed for 1,202 yards on 223 carries, a career-best 5.4 yards-per-carry average, in 15 games started. On November 11, Taylor surpassed 10,000 yards career rushing in a game against the Tennessee Titans. Taylor rushed for five straight 100-yard games in late November and December, earning him AFC Offensive Player of the Month honors. He tied for first in the NFL with four rushes of 50-plus yards and finished with two of the four longest rushes in the NFL in 2007. Following the season, he was named to the Associated Press second-team All-Pro team and was named to the 2008 Pro Bowl as an injury replacement, the first such honor of his career.

In his final season with the Jaguars in 2008, Taylor started the first 13 games of the season before being placed on injured reserve for the first time in his career, with a thumb injury, on December 11. A team captain for the second straight season, Taylor surpassed both the 11,000 yards career rushing and 13,000 career all-purpose yards milestones on the year. He finished the season with 556 yards on 113 carries; meanwhile, Jones-Drew, now a third-year player, rushed for 824 yards on 197 carries.

After his 2008 season had ended, when asked about his future with the team, Taylor said, "All of that still has to handle itself. I don't know how it's going to play out." Taylor said that it was clear to him that the organization was headed in "another direction" as a result of his reduced role with the team and the rise in his salary that was due to receive if he had remained on the roster.

On February 16, 2009, Taylor was released by the Jaguars after 11 seasons with the team.

=== New England Patriots ===
Taylor was signed to a two-year contract by the New England Patriots on February 27, 2009. He played in the first four games of the season for the Patriots, starting one, before suffering an ankle injury in Week 4 against the Baltimore Ravens. Despite the fact that the injury was expected to keep him out until late in the season, the Patriots chose not to place Taylor on injured reserve, and instead de-activated him. Taylor returned to the field for the Patriots' Week 16 matchup with his former team, the Jaguars, on December 27, 2009. He did not play until the fourth quarter, but managed to rush for 35 yards on 11 carries. He finished the season with 269 yards on 63 attempts and four touchdowns.

In 2010, Taylor played in the first three games of the season as a reserve before suffering a toe injury in Week 3 against the Buffalo Bills. He was inactive until Week 12 against the Detroit Lions, but did not play in that game. He saw his first snaps since Week 3 in the fourth quarter of the Patriots' Week 13 win over the New York Jets. Taylor played in seven games total, all as a reserve, running 43 times for 155 yards (3.6 yard average) and no touchdowns.

=== Retirement ===
On September 2, 2011, Taylor signed a one-day contract with the Jaguars in order to formally retire from the team that had drafted him ninth overall in 1998.

On June 7, 2012, the Jaguars announced that Taylor would become the second player inducted into the Pride of the Jaguars. He was formally inducted on September 30 during the team's game against the Cincinnati Bengals.

== NFL career statistics ==
Legend
**Bold**	Career high

Year	Team	GP	Rushing						Receiving						Fumbles	
Year	Team	GP	Att	Yds	Avg	Lng	TD	FD	Rec	Yds	Avg	Lng	TD	FD	Fum	Lost
1998	JAX	15	264	1,223	4.6	77	**14**	58	44	**421**	9.6	**78**	**3**	16	3	2
1999	JAX	10	159	732	4.6	52	6	38	10	83	8.3	41	0	4	0	0
2000	JAX	13	292	1,399	4.8	71	12	73	36	240	6.7	19	2	11	4	2
2001	JAX	2	30	116	3.9	24	0	6	2	13	6.5	11	0	1	1	1
2002	JAX	16	287	1,426	4.6	63	8	47	**49**	408	8.3	72	0	15	3	2
2003	JAX	16	**345**	**1,572**	4.6	62	6	**77**	48	370	7.7	60	1	16	**6**	**4**
2004	JAX	14	260	1,224	4.7	46	2	48	36	345	9.6	64	1	**17**	3	2
2005	JAX	11	194	787	4.1	71	3	26	13	83	6.4	13	0	4	0	0
2006	JAX	15	231	1,146	5.0	76	5	46	23	242	**10.5**	36	1	8	3	2
2007	JAX	15	223	1,202	**5.4**	**80**	5	45	9	58	6.4	18	0	2	2	1
2008	JAX	13	143	556	3.9	34	1	24	16	98	6.1	17	0	2	1	1
2009	NE	6	63	269	4.3	19	4	13	2	17	8.5	13	0	1	1	1
2010	NE	7	43	155	3.6	24	0	9	2	6	3.0	7	0	0	0	0
Total		153	2,534	11,695	4.6	80	66	510	290	2,384	8.2	78	8	97	27	18

=== Franchise records ===
As of 2017's NFL off-season, Taylor held at least 42 Jaguars franchise records, including:

- Rush Attempts: career (2,428), season (345 in 2003), game (37 on 2005-09-25 @NYJ), playoffs (127), playoff game (33 on 1999-01-03 NWE), rookie season (264 in 1998), rookie game (33 on 1999-01-03 NWE)
- Rush Yards: career (11,271), game (234 on 2000-11-19 @PIT), playoffs (612), rookie season (1,223 in 1998), rookie game (183 on 1998-12-06 DET)
- Rush Yds/Att: career (4.64), playoff season (6.62 in 1999), playoff game (7.5 on 2000-01-15 MIA)
- Rushing TDs: playoffs (3), rookie season (14 in 1998), rookie game (3 on 1998-11-15 TAM)
- Rush Yds/Game: career (80.5), season (107.6 in 2000), playoff season (124 in 1998), rookie season (81.5 in 1998)
- Total TDs: season (17 in 1998), playoff game (2), rookie season (17 in 1998), rookie game (3 on 1998-11-15 TAM)
- Yds from Scrimmage: career (13,632), playoffs (682), rookie season (1,644 in 1998)
- All Purpose Yds: career (13,640), playoffs (682)
- 100+ yard rushing games: career (51), season (9 in 2000), rookie season (3), playoffs (7)
- Games with 1+ TD scored: season (12 in 1998), playoffs (12)
- Games with 2+ TD scored: season (5 in 1998), playoffs (5)
- Games with 3+ TD scored: season (2 in 2000), playoffs (1)
- 1000+ rushing yard seasons: career (7)

== Personal life ==
Taylor is a first cousin of former NFL wide receiver Santonio Holmes. His son, Kelvin Taylor, also played college football at Florida and is a former NFL running back who was signed to several teams.

In November 2023, Taylor joined Tim Tebow as a co-owner of a planned Jacksonville USL Championship soccer club.

== The Pivot ==
Following his retirement from professional football, Taylor became involved in sports media and podcasting. He is a co-host of The Pivot, a podcast featuring former NFL players Ryan Clark and Channing Crowder. The program features conversations with athletes, entertainers, and other public figures.

== See also ==
- Florida Gators football, 1990–99
- List of Florida Gators football All-Americans
- List of Florida Gators in the NFL draft
- List of Jacksonville Jaguars first-round draft picks
- List of New England Patriots players
- List of University of Florida Athletic Hall of Fame members
