= Rogan's Shoes =

American shoe store chain

Rogan’s Shoes
- Company type: Private
- Industry: Retail
- Founded: Established in 1971 in Burlington, WI
- Headquarters: Racine, WI, USA
- Number of locations: 28 stores (2024)
- Area served: Wisconsin, Illinois, Minnesota
- Key people: Jack Rogan - Founder; Patrick Rogan - President
- Products: Shoes and Clothing
- Number of employees: ~600
- Website: Rogan’s Shoes

Rogan's Shoes is a shoe store chain headquartered in Racine, Wisconsin. It operates 29 stores in three Midwestern states: Illinois, Minnesota, and Wisconsin. In 2024, what had been a family-owned business was purchased by national retailer Shoe Carnival.

== History ==
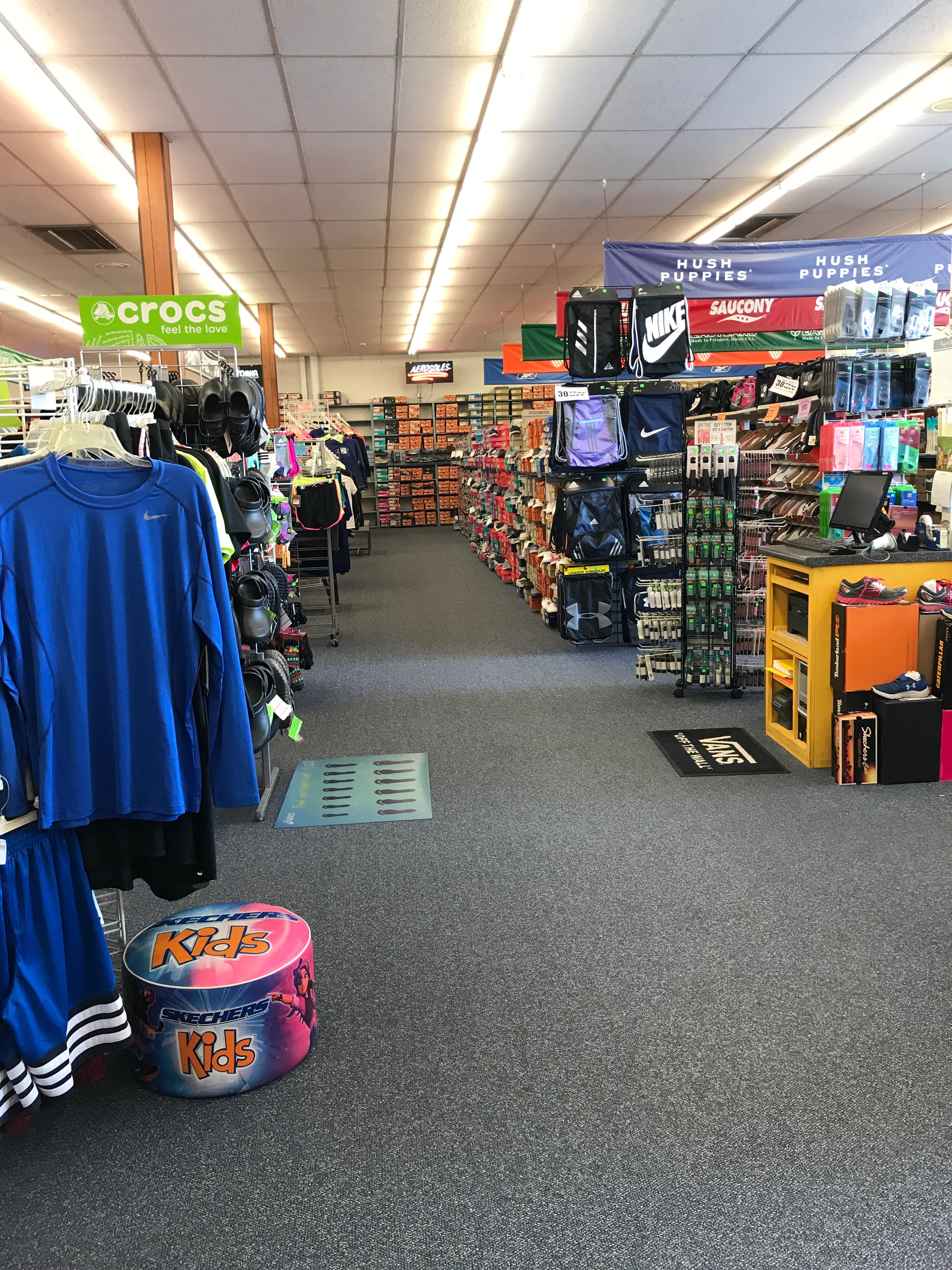
An aisle at Rogan's Shoes Manitowoc, Wisconsin location, photographed in 2017

Rogan's Shoes was founded in 1971 with its first store in Racine, Wisconsin. The chain expanded into the neighboring states of Iowa, Illinois, and Minnesota. Rogan's launched its initial website in 2000 and began selling products online in 2004. The company stayed out of large metropolitan markets until 2008, when it for the first time opened a store in the greater Milwaukee area.

On February 13, 2024, Shoe Carnival announced it had acquired Rogan's Shoes at a price of $45 million.

Founder Jack Rogan had 11 children, several of whom were still involved with the business when it sold in 2024.

== Charitable endeavors ==
Rogan's has teamed up with name brand Skechers to help distribute shoes to low-income areas served by Rogan's locations, including Racine and Kenosha, Wisconsin.

== Legal issues ==
In 2010 customers filed a class-action lawsuit against the company for printing expiration dates of credit cards on receipts, a violation of the Fair and Accurate Credit Transactions Act. Rogan Shoes eventually settled with the lawsuit plaintiff and the class for $16 million, but not in cash, or at least not Rogan Shoes’ cash. The settlement agreement specified that the judgment would be satisfied only through proceeds from Rogan Shoes’ insurance policies, with the exception of an up-front cash payment by Rogan Shoes of $50,000 to cover the named plaintiff's legal costs. As part of the settlement agreement, Rogan Shoes assigned to the plaintiffs all of its “claims against and rights to payments from” its insurer under the policies.
