= Roggan River =

Roggan

Location
- Country: Canada
- Province: Quebec
- Region: Eeyou Istchee Baie-James (municipality)

Physical characteristics
- Source: Lac Amichikukamaskach
  - location: Eeyou Istchee Baie-James (municipality), Nord-du-Québec, Quebec
  - coordinates: 54°06′48″N 79°58′51″W
  - elevation: 203 m (666 ft)
- Mouth: Nottaway River
  - location: Eeyou Istchee Baie-James (municipality), Nord-du-Québec, Quebec
  - coordinates: 54°24′36″N 79°27′59″W
  - elevation: 0 m (0 ft)
- Length: 193 km (120 mi)
- Basin size: 9,583 km^{2} (3,700 sq mi)

The Roggan River is a tributary of the eastern shore of James Bay. This river runs westward in the municipality of Eeyou Istchee Baie-James (municipality), in the administrative region of Nord-du-Québec, in Quebec, in Canada.

== Geography ==
The Roggan River is the penultimate river south of Louis XIV Point, which delineates James Bay and Hudson Bay; the mouth of the river is located 30 kilometres (19 mi) southeast of Pointe Louis-XIV. The Roggan flows south and parallel to the Seal River; as well as north and parallel to the Piagochioui River.

Located near the locality of Kanaaupscow, Amichikukamaskach Lake (length: 8.2 kilometres (5.1 mi) by 2.3 kilometres (1.4 mi) wide) is the head lake of the Roggan River, located to the west of the Robert-Bourassa Reservoir.

Along its westward course (in the direction of James Bay), the Roggan escapes and forms several important lakes, including Lakes Lorin (altitude: 190 metres (620 ft)), Pamigamachi (altitude: 168 metres (551 ft)) and Roggan (altitude: 165 metres (541 ft)).

The waters of the Roggan River flow into an archipelago of islands on the northeastern coast of James Bay, in the hamlet of the same name as the river.

South of the Roggan River, a chain of hills (height between 6 metres (20 ft) to 60 metres (200 ft)) with a complex relief stretches long north-west of the Robert-Bourassa Reservoir.

== Toponymy ==
A written source indicates that, in 1828, the Roggan was dubbed the "Pishop Roggan". The spelling "Bishoproggin R." (later "Bishop Roggan River" or "Bishop Roggan's River") appears on an Arrowsmith British North America map (1822). According to geographer J. Keith Fraser, in Place Names of the Hudson Bay Region (1968), the term "Bishoproggin" is an anglicization of the Cree words pichipouian or peshipwaytok, or "fish tank". However, no source shows a toponymic link with the country's clergy or religious history.

Locally, the Cree people designate the Roggan Amistustikwach, which means "three rivers".

The toponym Rivière Roggan was formalised on 5 December 1968, at the Bank of Place Names of the Commission de toponymie du Québec (i.e., at the foundation of this commission).

== See also ==
- Jamésie
- List of rivers of Quebec
- List of Hudson Bay rivers
- List of rivers of Canada
