= 1998 Jacksonville Jaguars season =

4th season in franchise history; first division title

- Owner: Wayne Weaver
- Head coach: Tom Coughlin
- Offensive coordinator: Chris Palmer
- Defensive coordinator: Dick Jauron
- Home stadium: Alltel Stadium

Results
- Record: 11–5
- Division place: 1st AFC Central
- Playoffs: Won Wild Card Playoffs (vs. Patriots) 25–10; Lost Divisional Playoffs (at Jets) 24–34
- Pro Bowlers: T Tony Boselli; WR Jimmy Smith

Uniform

The 1998 season was the Jacksonville Jaguars' 4th season in the National Football League (NFL) and their 4th season under the leadership of general manager and head coach Tom Coughlin. The team equaled the 11–5 record from their previous season, but won their first division title, as both the Tennessee Oilers and Pittsburgh Steelers lost crucial games near the end of the regular season. In the playoffs the Jaguars won their Wild Card game versus the New England Patriots, 25–10, but lost the following week in the Divisional round against the New York Jets, 34–24.

The Jaguars appeared twice on Monday Night Football, winning both games.

== Offseason ==
| Additions | Subtractions |
|---|---|
| LB Bryce Paup (Bills) | LB Eddie Robinson Jr. (Oilers) |
| DE Fernando Smith (Vikings) | RB Natrone Means (Chargers) |

=== NFL draft ===
1998 Jacksonville Jaguars draft
| Round | Pick | Player | Position | College | Notes |
| 1 | 9 | Fred Taylor * | Running back | Florida | from Buffalo |
| 1 | 25 | Donovin Darius | Safety | Syracuse | |
| 2 | 57 | Cordell Taylor | Cornerback | Hampton | |
| 3 | 86 | Jonathan Quinn | Quarterback | Middle Tennessee | |
| 4 | 101 | Tavian Banks | Running back | Iowa | from Buffalo |
| 4 | 118 | Harry Deligianis | Defensive tackle | Youngstown State | |
| 5 | 148 | John Wade | Center | Marshall | |
| 6 | 179 | Lamanzer Williams | Defensive end | Minnesota | |
| 6 | 182 | Kevin McLeod | Running back | Auburn | |
| 7 | 192 | Alvis Whitted | Wide receiver | North Carolina State | |
| 7 | 214 | Brandon Tolbert | Linebacker | Georgia | |
Made roster * Made at least one Pro Bowl during career

=== Undrafted free agents ===
1998 Undrafted free agents of note
| Player | Position | College |
|---|---|---|
| Jason Baker | Tackle | Montana |
| Pierre Brillant | Tackle | Cincinnati |

== Staff ==
1998 Jacksonville Jaguars staff
| Front office: Chairman/chief executive officer – Wayne Weaver; Senior vice president of football operations – Michael Huyghue; Director of Player Personnel – Rick Reiprish; Director of College Scouting – Rick Mueller; Director of Pro Scouting – Fran Foley; College scout – Louis Clark; College scout – Gene Smith; Head coaches: Head coach – Tom Coughlin; Offensive coaches: Offensive coordinator/quarterbacks – Chris Palmer; Running backs – Jerald Ingram; Wide receivers – Pete Carmichael; Tight ends – Fred Hoaglin; Offensive line – Mike Maser; Offensive quality control – John McNulty | Defensive coaches: Defensive coordinator – Dick Jauron; Defensive line – John Pease; Linebackers – Steve Szabo; Outside linebackers – Lucious Selmon; Defensive backs – Perry Fewell; Special teams coaches: Special teams coordinator – Larry Pasquale; Assistant special teams – Joe Baker; Strength and conditioning: Strength and conditioning – Jerry Palmieri; Assistant strength and conditioning – Greg Finnegan |

== Final roster ==
1998 Jacksonville Jaguars roster
| Quarterbacks (QB): 8 Mark Brunell; 2 Will Furrer; 12 Jonathan Quinn; Running backs (RB): 22 Tavian Banks KR; 34 Zack Crockett FB; 24 Chris Howard; 43 George Jones; 31 Daimon Shelton FB; 28 Fred Taylor; Wide receivers (WR): 84 Reggie Barlow; 87 Keenan McCardell; 81 Will Moore; 82 Jimmy Smith; 86 Alvis Whitted; Tight ends (TE): 88 Damon Jones; 83 Pete Mitchell; 89 Troy Sadowski | Offensive linemen (OL): 71 Tony Boselli T; 62 Ben Coleman G; 73 Brian DeMarco G; 78 Todd Fordham T; 67 Quentin Neujahr; 68 Mark Nori G; 72 Leon Searcy T; 76 Rich Tylski G; 66 John Wade C; Defensive linemen (DL): 90 Tony Brackens DE; 75 Eric Curry DE; 64 John Jurkovic DT; 57 Reggie Lowe DE; 94 Kelvin Pritchett DT; 99 Joel Smeenge DE; 96 Fernando Smith DE; 93 Jose White DT; 74 Lamanzer Williams DE | Linebackers (LB): 51 Kevin Hardy OLB; 53 Eddie Mason OLB; 55 Tom McManus MLB; 95 Bryce Paup OLB; 58 Bryan Schwartz MLB; 50 Erik Storz OLB; Defensive backs (DB): 21 Aaron Beasley CB; 45 Travis Davis S; 20 Donovin Darius SS; 26 Kevin Devine CB; 27 Deon Figures CB; 37 Chris Hudson FS; 32 Mike Logan FS/KR; 38 Blaine McElmurry SS; 23 Cordell Taylor CB; 41 Dave Thomas CB; Special teams (ST): 4 Bryan Barker P; 1 Mike Hollis K | Practice squad: 70 James Clyburn DT; 15 Damon Dunn WR; 65 Andrew Greene G/T; 48 Mark Thomas TE; Reserve: 52 Brant Boyer LB (IR); 63 Michael Cheever C (IR); 92 Don Davey DT (IR); 85 Rich Griffith (IR); 54 James Hamilton LB (IR); 56 Jeff Lageman DE (IR); 10 Jamie Martin QB (IR); 67 Jeff Novak G/T (IR); 91 Seth Payne DT (IR); 29 Tawambi Settles S (IR); 33 James Stewart RB (IR); 98 Jabbar Threats DE (IR); 97 Renaldo Wynn DE/DT (IR); Rookies in italics 53 active, 13 reserve, 4 practice squad |

== Preseason ==
| Week | Date | Opponent | Result | Record | Venue |
|---|---|---|---|---|---|
| 1 | August 8 | at Carolina Panthers | L 27–30 | 0–1 | Ericsson Stadium |
| 2 | August 14 | New York Giants | W 24–10 | 1–1 | Alltel Stadium |
| 3 | August 22 | at Kansas City Chiefs | L 21–22 | 1–2 | Arrowhead Stadium |
| 4 | August 27 | Dallas Cowboys | W 42–20 | 2–2 | Alltel Stadium |

== Regular season ==
=== Schedule ===
| Week | Date | Opponent | Result | Record | Venue | Attendance |
|---|---|---|---|---|---|---|
| 1 | September 6 | at Chicago Bears | **W** 24–23 | 1–0 | Soldier Field | 55,614 |
| 2 | September 13 | Kansas City Chiefs | **W** 21–16 | 2–0 | Alltel Stadium | 69,821 |
| 3 | September 20 | **Baltimore Ravens** | **W** 24–10 | 3–0 | Alltel Stadium | 67,069 |
| 4 | September 27 | at **Tennessee Oilers** | **W** 27–22 | 4–0 | Vanderbilt Stadium | 34,656 |
| 5 | Bye | | | | | |
| 6 | October 12 | Miami Dolphins | **W** 28–21 | 5–0 | Alltel Stadium | 74,051 |
| 7 | October 18 | at Buffalo Bills | **L** 16–17 | 5–1 | Ralph Wilson Stadium | 77,635 |
| 8 | October 25 | at Denver Broncos | **L** 24–37 | 5–2 | Mile High Stadium | 75,217 |
| 9 | November 1 | at **Baltimore Ravens** | **W** 45–19 | 6–2 | Ravens Stadium | 68,915 |
| 10 | November 8 | **Cincinnati Bengals** | **W** 24–11 | 7–2 | Alltel Stadium | 67,040 |
| 11 | November 15 | Tampa Bay Buccaneers | **W** 29–24 | 8–2 | Alltel Stadium | 72,974 |
| 12 | November 22 | at **Pittsburgh Steelers** | **L** 15–30 | 8–3 | Three Rivers Stadium | 59,124 |
| 13 | November 29 | at **Cincinnati Bengals** | **W** 34–17 | 9–3 | Cinergy Field | 55,432 |
| 14 | December 6 | Detroit Lions | **W** 37–22 | 10–3 | Alltel Stadium | 70,717 |
| 15 | December 13 | **Tennessee Oilers** | **L** 13–16 | 10–4 | Alltel Stadium | 65,657 |
| 16 | December 20 | at Minnesota Vikings | **L** 10–50 | 10–5 | Hubert H. Humphrey Metrodome | 64,363 |
| 17 | December 28 | **Pittsburgh Steelers** | **W** 21–3 | 11–5 | Alltel Stadium | 74,143 |

Note: Intra-division opponents are in bold text.

=== Game summaries ===
==== Week 1: at Chicago Bears ====
Week One: Jacksonville Jaguars at Chicago Bears – Game summary

| Quarter | 1 | 2 | 3 | 4 | Total |
|---|---|---|---|---|---|
| **Jaguars** | 0 | 7 | 7 | 10 | **24** |
| Bears | 3 | 10 | 0 | 10 | **23** |

at Soldier Field, Chicago, Illinois

- Date: September 6, 1998
- Game time: 1:00 p.m. EDT
- Game weather: Hazy, 88 °F (31 °C)
- Game attendance: 55,614
- Referee: Tony Corrente
- Recap, Game Book

Game information

**First quarter**

- CHI – Jeff Jaeger 45-yard field goal, 5:56. Bears 3–0. **Drive: 4 plays, 9 yards, 1:57.**

**Second quarter**

- JAX – James Stewart 3-yard pass from Mark Brunell (Mike Hollis kick), 7:25. Jaguars 7–3. **Drive: 8 plays, 66 yards, 4:24.**
- CHI – Glyn Milburn 88-yard kickoff return (Jeff Jaeger kick), 7:06. Bears 10–7.
- CHI – Jeff Jaeger 35-yard field goal, 0:03. Bears 13–7. **Drive: 9 plays, 25 yards, 2:01.**

**Third quarter**

- JAX – James Stewart 7-yard run (Mike Hollis kick), 2:27. Jaguars 14–13. **Drive: 4 plays, 27 yards, 1:48.**

**Fourth quarter**

- JAX – Mike Hollis 23-yard field goal, 14:16. Jaguars 17–13. **Drive: 7 plays, 27 yards, 2:52.**
- CHI – Edgar Bennett 1-yard run (Jeff Jaeger kick), 8:50. Bears 20–17. **Drive: 11 plays, 72 yards, 5:26.**
- CHI – Jeff Jaeger 19-yard field goal, 4:08. Bears 23–17. **Drive: 10 plays, 57 yards, 4:16.**
- JAX – Jimmy Smith 4-yard pass from Mark Brunell (Mike Hollis kick), 0:29. Jaguars 24–23. **Drive: 12 plays, 87 yards, 3:39.**

Top passers

- JAX – Mark Brunell – 22/35, 207 yards, 2 TD, 2 INT
- CHI – Erik Kramer – 16/27, 189 yards

Top rushers

- JAX – James Stewart – 26 rushes, 115 yards, TD
- CHI – Curtis Enis – 12 rushes, 77 yards

Top receivers

- JAX – Jimmy Smith – 9 receptions, 90 yards, TD
- BAL – Curtis Conway – 6 receptions, 91 yards

==== Week 2: vs. Kansas City Chiefs ====
Week Two: Kansas City Chiefs at Jacksonville Jaguars – Game summary

| Quarter | 1 | 2 | 3 | 4 | Total |
|---|---|---|---|---|---|
| Chiefs | 0 | 6 | 3 | 7 | **16** |
| **Jaguars** | 7 | 7 | 7 | 0 | **21** |

at Alltel Stadium, Jacksonville, Florida

- Date: September 13, 1998
- Game time: 1:00 p.m. EDT
- Game weather: Sunny and clear, 82 °F (28 °C)
- Game attendance: 69,821
- Referee: Bill Carollo
- Recap, Game Book

Game information

**First quarter**

- JAX – Reggie Barlow 85-yard punt return (Mike Hollis kick), 10:58. Jaguars 7–0.

**Second quarter**

- JAX – Jimmy Smith 17-yard pass from Mark Brunell (Mike Hollis kick), 10:35. Jaguars 14–0. **Drive: 8 plays, 62 yards, 4:15.**
- KC – Pete Stoyanovich 36-yard field goal, 1:05. Jaguars 14–3. **Drive: 14 plays, 72 yards, 5:42.**
- KC – Pete Stoyanovich 43-yard field goal, 0:01. Jaguars 14–6. **Drive: 3 plays, 27 yards, 0:22.**

**Third quarter**

- JAX – James Stewart 1-yard run (Mike Hollis kick), 11:52. Jaguars 21–6. **Drive: 7 plays, 31 yards, 3:08.**
- KC – Pete Stoyanovich 29-yard field goal, 9:03. Jaguars 21–9. **Drive: 7 plays, 56 yards, 2:49.**

**Fourth quarter**

- KC – Kimble Anders 3-yard run (Pete Stoyanovich kick), 3:39. Jaguars 21–16. **Drive: 13 plays, 80 yards, 5:16.**

Top passers

- KC – Rich Gannon – 23/37, 263 yards
- JAX – Mark Brunell – 11/18, 126 yards, TD

Top rushers

- KC – Donnell Bennett – 13 rushes, 46 yards
- JAX – James Stewart – 26 rushes, 103 yards, TD

Top receivers

- KC – Tony Gonzalez – 7 receptions, 67 yards
- JAX – Jimmy Smith – 4 receptions, 57 yards, TD

==== Week 3: vs. Baltimore Ravens ====
Week Three: Baltimore Ravens at Jacksonville Jaguars – Game summary

| Quarter | 1 | 2 | 3 | 4 | Total |
|---|---|---|---|---|---|
| Ravens | 3 | 7 | 0 | 0 | **10** |
| **Jaguars** | 7 | 3 | 14 | 0 | **24** |

at Alltel Stadium, Jacksonville, Florida

- Date: September 20, 1998
- Game time: 4:15 p.m. EDT
- Game weather: 82 °F (28 °C)
- Game attendance: 67,069
- Recap, Game Book

Game information

**First quarter**

- JAX – Fred Taylor 52-yard run (Mike Hollis kick), 7:48. Jaguars 7–0. **Drive: 3 plays, 88 yards, 1:10.**
- BAL – Matt Stover 25-yard field goal, 1:29. Jaguars 7–3. **Drive: 7 plays, 65 yards, 3:05.**

**Second quarter**

- BAL – Jermaine Lewis 56-yard pass from Eric Zeier (Matt Stover kick), 4:07. Ravens 10–7. **Drive: 3 plays, 80 yards, 1:39.**
- JAX – Mike Hollis 34-yard field goal, 0:06. Tied 10–10. **Drive: 2 plays, 0 yards, 0:08.**

**Third quarter**

- JAX – Jimmy Smith 72-yard pass from Mark Brunell (Mike Hollis kick), 13:57. Jaguars 17–10. **Drive: 2 plays, 74 yards, 1:03.**
- JAX – Damon Jones 1-yard pass from Mark Brunell (Mike Hollis kick), 4:14. Jaguars 24–10. **Drive: 14 plays, 80 yards, 7:55.**

**Fourth quarter**

- No scoring plays.

Top passers

- BAL – Eric Zeier – 13/25, 189 yards, TD, INT
- JAX – Mark Brunell – 25/34, 376 yards, 2 TD

Top rushers

- BAL – Jay Graham – 20 rushes, 67 yards
- JAX – Fred Taylor – 23 rushes, 128 yards, TD

Top receivers

- BAL – Jermaine Lewis – 4 receptions, 117 yards, TD
- JAX – Jimmy Smith – 2 receptions, 116 yards, TD

==== Week 4: at Tennessee Oilers ====
Week Four: Jacksonville Jaguars at Tennessee Oilers – Game summary

| Quarter | 1 | 2 | 3 | 4 | Total |
|---|---|---|---|---|---|
| **Jaguars** | 7 | 7 | 7 | 6 | **27** |
| Oilers | 10 | 9 | 3 | 0 | **22** |

at Vanderbilt Stadium, Nashville, Tennessee

- Date: September 27, 1998
- Game time: 1:00 p.m. EDT
- Game weather: Sunny, 88 °F (31 °C)
- Game attendance: 34,656
- Referee: Dick Hantak
- Recap, Game Book

Game information

**First quarter**

- TEN – Al Del Greco 34-yard field goal, 9:43. Oilers 3–0. **Drive: 11 plays, 53 yards, 5:17.**
- JAX – Damon Jones 5-yard pass from Mark Brunell (Mike Hollis kick), 3:25. Jaguars 7–3. **Drive: 11 plays, 61 yards, 6:18.**
- TEN – Yancy Thigpen 38-yard pass from Steve McNair (Al Del Greco kick), 1:35. Oilers 10–7. **Drive: 4 plays, 51 yards, 1:50.**

**Second quarter**

- TEN – Al Del Greco 32-yard field goal, 7:45. Oilers 13–7. **Drive: 15 plays, 60 yards, 7:46.**
- TEN – Yancy Thigpen 18-yard pass from Steve McNair (run failed), 6:09. Oilers 19–7. **Drive: 4 plays, 32 yards, 1:22.**
- JAX – Keenan McCardell 7-yard pass from Mark Brunell (Mike Hollis kick), 0:21. Oilers 19–14. **Drive: 8 plays, 31 yards, 2:24.**

**Third quarter**

- JAX – Fred Taylor 1-yard run (Mike Hollis kick), 11:42. Jaguars 21–19. **Drive: 6 plays, 80 yards, 3:18.**
- TEN – Al Del Greco 32-yard field goal, 6:07. Oilers 22–21. **Drive: 6 plays, 36 yards, 2:50.**

**Fourth quarter**

- JAX – Mike Hollis 18-yard field goal, 9:45. Jaguars 24–22. **Drive: 10 plays, 51 yards, 4:08.**
- JAX – Mike Hollis 36-yard field goal, 1:56. Jaguars 27–22. **Drive: 13 plays, 39 yards, 6:35.**

Top passers

- JAX – Mark Brunell – 17/28, 155 yards, 2 TD, 2 INT
- TEN – Steve McNair – 16/30, 198 yards, 2 TD, 2 INT

Top rushers

- JAX – Fred Taylor – 25 rushes, 116 yards, TD
- TEN – Eddie George – 14 rushes, 25 yards

Top receivers

- JAX – Keenan McCardell – 6 receptions, 68 yards, TD
- TEN – Yancey Thigpen – 6 receptions, 102 yards, 2 TD

==== Week 6: vs. Miami Dolphins ====
Week Six: Miami Dolphins at Jacksonville Jaguars – Game summary

| Quarter | 1 | 2 | 3 | 4 | Total |
|---|---|---|---|---|---|
| Dolphins | 0 | 7 | 14 | 0 | **21** |
| **Jaguars** | 7 | 7 | 0 | 14 | **28** |

at Alltel Stadium, Jacksonville, Florida

- Date: October 12
- Game time: 8:20 p.m. EDT
- Game weather: 74 °F (23 °C)
- Game attendance: 74,051
- Referee: Johnny Grier
- Recap, Game Book

Game information

**First quarter**

- JAX – Fred Taylor 77-yard run (Mike Hollis kick), 14:40. Jaguars 7–0. **Drive: 1 play, 77 yards, 0:20.**

**Second quarter**

- JAX – Fred Taylor 2-yard run (Mike Hollis kick), 14:31. Jaguars 14–0. **Drive: 6 plays, 53 yards, 2:34.**
- MIA – Troy Drayton 2-yard pass from Dan Marino (Olindo Mare kick), 7:41. Jaguars 14–7. **Drive: 12 plays, 69 yards, 6:50.**

**Third quarter**

- MIA – Karim Abdul-Jabbar 1-yard run (Olindo Mare kick), 10:29. Tied 14–14. **Drive: 9 plays, 55 yards, 4:31.**
- MIA – Troy Drayton 15-yard pass from Dan Marino (Olindo Mare) kick), 3:28. Dolphins 21–14. **Drive: 9 plays, 63 yards, 5:40.**

**Fourth quarter**

- JAX – Keenan McCardell 23-yard pass from Mark Brunell (Mike Hollis kick), 11:55. Tied 21–21. **Drive: 4 plays, 40 yards, 1:38.**
- JAX – Keenan McCardell 56-yard pass from Mark Brunell (Mike Hollis kick), 2:36. Jaguars 28–21. **Drive: 1 play, 56 yards, 0:08.**

Top passers

- MIA – Dan Marino – 30/49, 323 yards, TD, 2 INT
- JAX – Mark Brunell – 12/18, 213 yards, 2 TD, INT

Top rushers

- MIA – Karim Abdul-Jabbar – 214 rushes, 43 yards, TD
- JAX – Fred Taylor – 12 rushes, 89 yards, 2 TD

Top receivers

- MIA – Oronde Gadsden – 5 receptions, 91 yards
- JAX – Keenan McCardell – 3 receptions, 86 yards, 2 TD

==== Week 7: at Buffalo Bills ====
Week Seven: Jacksonville Jaguars at Buffalo Bills – Game summary

| Quarter | 1 | 2 | 3 | 4 | Total |
|---|---|---|---|---|---|
| Jaguars | 7 | 3 | 6 | 0 | **16** |
| **Bills** | 0 | 7 | 3 | 7 | **17** |

at Rich Stadium, Buffalo, New York

- Date: October 18, 1998
- Game time: 1:00 p.m. EDT
- Game weather: Cloudy, 76 °F (24 °C)
- Game attendance: 77,635
- Referee: Tom White
- Recap, Game Book

Game information

**First quarter**

- JAX – Tavian Banks 1-yard run (Mike Hollis kick), 4:33. Jaguars 7–0. **Drive: 16 plays, 69 yards, 10:27.**

**Second quarter**

- BUF – Eric Moulds 12-yard pass from Doug Flutie (Steve Christie kick), 12:20. Tied 7–7. **Drive: 10 plays, 80 yards, 4:05.**
- JAX – Mike Hollis 35-yard field goal, 0:00. Jaguars 10–7. **Drive: 14 plays, 63 yards, 4:08.**

**Third quarter**

- JAX – Mike Hollis 23-yard field goal, 10:53. Jaguars 13–7. **Drive: 4 plays, 7 yards, 1:26.**
- BUF – Steve Christie 24-yard field goal, 7:04. Jaguars 13–10. **Drive: 9 plays, 58 yards, 3:49.**
- JAX – Mike Hollis 27-yard field goal, 0:20. Jaguars 16–10. **Drive: 13 plays, 51 yards, 6:44.**

**Fourth quarter**

- BUF – Doug Flutie 1-yard run (Steve Christie kick), 0:13. Bills 17–16. **Drive: 12 plays, 70 yards, 1:37.**

Top passers

- JAX – Mark Brunell – 16/28, 119 yards
- BUF – Doug Flutie – 18/39, 228 yards, TD

Top rushers

- JAX – Daimon Shelton – 13 rushes, 44 yards
- BUF – Antowain Smith – 11 rushes, 47 yards

Top receivers

- JAX – Jimmy Smith – 5 receptions, 42 yards
- BUF – Eric Moulds – 4 receptions, 68 yards, TD

==== Week 8: at Denver Broncos ====
Week Eight: Jacksonville Jaguars at Denver Broncos – Game summary

| Quarter | 1 | 2 | 3 | 4 | Total |
|---|---|---|---|---|---|
| Jaguars | 3 | 7 | 7 | 7 | **24** |
| **Broncos** | 3 | 24 | 0 | 10 | **37** |

at Mile High Stadium, Denver, Colorado

- Date: October 25, 1998
- Game time: 4:15 p.m. EDT
- Game weather: Partly cloudy, 63 °F (17 °C)
- Game attendance: 75,217
- Referee: Phil Luckett
- Recap, Game Book

Game information

**First quarter**

- DEN – Jason Elam 31-yard field goal, 10:39. Broncos 3–0. **Drive: 10 plays, 63 yards, 4:21.**
- JAX – Mike Hollis 45-yard field goal, 4:01. Tied 3–3. **Drive: 12 plays, 45 yards, 4:08.**

**Second quarter**

- DEN – Ed McCaffrey 41-yard pass from John Elway (Jason Elam kick), 14:52. Broncos 10–3. **Drive: 7 plays, 72 yards, 4:09.**
- DEN – Terrell Davis 4-yard run (Jason Elam kick), 11:08. Broncos 17–3. **Drive: 2 plays, 9 yards, 0:54.**
- JAX – Fred Taylor 4-yard pass from Mark Brunell (Mike Hollis kick), 10:45. Broncos 17–10. **Drive: 1 play, 4 yards, 0:23.**
- DEN – Terrell Davis 1-yard run (Jason Elam kick), 5:18. Broncos 24–10. **Drive: 10 plays, 69 yards, 5:27.**
- DEN – Jason Elam 63-yard field goal, 0:00. Broncos 27–10. **Drive: 9 plays, 32 yards, 2:48.**

**Third quarter**

- JAX – Damon Jones 31-yard pass from Mark Brunell (Mike Hollis kick), 5:25. Broncos 27–17. **Drive: 6 plays, 79 yards, 2:34.**

**Fourth quarter**

- DEN – Terrell Davis 37-yard run (Jason Elam kick), 14:14. Broncos 34–17. **Drive: 1 play, 37 yards, 0:09.**
- JAX – Pete Mitchell 2-yard pass from Mark Brunell (Mike Hollis kick), 10:35. Broncos 34–24. **Drive: 9 plays, 64 yards, 3:39.**
- DEN – Jason Elam 32-yard field goal, 5:21. Broncos 37–24. **Drive: 10 plays, 62 yards, 5:14.**

Top passers

- JAX – Mark Brunell – 28/46, 353 yards, 3 TD
- DEN – John Elway – 21/35, 295 yards, TD

Top rushers

- JAX – Fred Taylor – 6 rushes, 27 yards
- DEN – Terrell Davis – 31 rushes, 136 yards, 3 TD

Top receivers

- JAX – Jimmy Smith – 8 receptions, 121 yards
- DEN – Ed McCaffrey – 3 receptions, 92 yards, TD

==== Week 9: at Baltimore Ravens ====
Week Nine: Jacksonville Jaguars at Baltimore Ravens – Game summary

| Quarter | 1 | 2 | 3 | 4 | Total |
|---|---|---|---|---|---|
| **Jaguars** | 14 | 28 | 0 | 3 | **45** |
| Ravens | 7 | 6 | 0 | 6 | **19** |

at Ravens Stadium at Camden Yards, Baltimore, Maryland

- Date: November 1, 1998
- Game time: 1:00 p.m. EST
- Game weather: Mostly sunny, 64 °F (18 °C)
- Game attendance: 68,915
- Referee: Jerry Markbreit
- Recap, Game Book

Game information

**First quarter**

- JAX – Jimmy Smith 37-yard pass from Mark Brunell (Mike Hollis kick), 7:58. Jaguars 7–0. **Drive: 6 plays, 76 yards, 2:54.**
- BAL – Jermaine Lewis 6-yard pass from Jim Harbaugh (Matt Stover kick), 1:42. Tied 7–7. **Drive: 10 plays, 73 yards, 6:16.**
- JAX – Fred Taylor 78-yard pass from Mark Brunell (Mike Hollis kick), 1:19. Jaguars 14–7. **Drive: 1 play, 78 yards, 0:23.**

**Second quarter**

- JAX – Fred Taylor 1-yard run (Mike Hollis kick), 13:31. Jaguars 21–7. **Drive: 7 plays, 25 yards, 2:29.**
- JAX – Daimon Shelton 2-yard run (Mike Hollis kick), 9:33. Jaguars 28–7. **Drive: 7 plays, 28 yards, 2:51.**
- JAX – Alvis Whitted 24-yard blocked punt return (Mike Hollis kick), 4:03. Jaguars 35–7.
- JAX – Donovin Darius 83-yard fumble return (Mike Hollis kick), 2:59. Jaguars 42–7.
- BAL – Floyd Turner 5-yard pass from Jim Harbaugh (pass failed), 0:46. Jaguars 42–13. **Drive: 6 plays, 74 yards, 2:13.**

**Third quarter**

- No scoring plays.

**Fourth quarter**

- JAX – Mike Hollis 33-yard field goal, 9:19. Jaguars 45–13. **Drive: 8 plays, 26 yards, 4:38.**
- BAL – Patrick Johnson 3-yard pass from Jim Harbaugh (pass failed), 4:30. Jaguars 45–19. **Drive: 11 plays, 62 yards, 4:49.**

Top passers

- JAX – Mark Brunell – 13/20, 237 yards, 2 TD, INT
- BAL – Jim Harbaugh – 27/34, 243 yards, 3 TD, INT

Top rushers

- JAX – Fred Taylor – 22 rushes, 87 yards, TD
- BAL – Jim Harbaugh – 10 rushes, 57 yards

Top receivers

- JAX – Fred Taylor – 1 reception, 78 yards, TD
- BAL – Jermaine Lewis – 4 receptions, 56 yards, TD

==== Week 10: vs. Cincinnati Bengals ====
Week Ten: Cincinnati Bengals at Jacksonville Jaguars – Game summary

| Quarter | 1 | 2 | 3 | 4 | Total |
|---|---|---|---|---|---|
| Bengals | 0 | 0 | 3 | 8 | **11** |
| **Jaguars** | 10 | 14 | 0 | 0 | **24** |

at Alltel Stadium, Jacksonville, Florida

- Date: November 8, 1998
- Game time: 1:00 p.m. EST
- Game weather: 75 °F (24 °C)
- Game attendance: 67,040
- Referee: Mike Carey
- Recap, Game Book

Game information

**First quarter**

- JAX – Fred Taylor 1-yard run (Mike Hollis kick), 10:13. Jaguars 7–0. **Drive: 5 plays, 67 yards, 2:15.**
- JAX – Mike Hollis 39-yard field goal, 1:37. Jaguars 10–0. **Drive: 16 plays, 59 yards, 6:07.**

**Second quarter**

- JAX – Jimmy Smith 18-yard pass from Mark Brunell (Mike Hollis kick), 13:11. Jaguars 17–0. **Drive: 4 plays, 50 yards, 1:42.**
- JAX – Aaron Beasley 90-yard fumble return (Mike Hollis kick), 8:30. Jaguars 24–0.

**Third quarter**

- CIN – Doug Pelfrey 50-yard field goal, 8:16. Jaguars 24–3. **Drive: 13 plays, 42 yards, 6:44.**

**Fourth quarter**

- CIN – Damon Gibson 9-yard pass from Paul Justin (run succeeded), 1:55. Jaguars 24–11. **Drive: 12 plays, 69 yards, 5:32.**

Top passers

- CIN – Neil O'Donnell – 17/30, 128 yards, INT
- JAX – Mark Brunell – 5/12, 111 yards, TD

Top rushers

- CIN – Corey Dillon – 16 rushes, 76 yards
- JAX – Fred Taylor – 27 rushes, 118 yards, TD

Top receivers

- CIN – James Hundon – 4 receptions, 43 yards
- JAX – Alvis Whitted – 1 reception, 55 yards

==== Week 11: vs. Tampa Bay Buccaneers ====
Week Eleven: Tampa Bay Buccaneers at Jacksonville Jaguars – Game summary

| Quarter | 1 | 2 | 3 | 4 | Total |
|---|---|---|---|---|---|
| Buccaneers | 3 | 14 | 0 | 7 | **24** |
| **Jaguars** | 7 | 7 | 6 | 9 | **29** |

at Alltel Stadium, Jacksonville, Florida

- Date: November 15, 1998
- Game time: 4:15 p.m. EST
- Game weather: 78 °F (26 °C)
- Game attendance: 71,974
- Referee: Bernie Kukar
- Recap, Game Book

Game information

**First quarter**

- JAX – Fred Taylor 6-yard run (Mike Hollis kick), 6:47. Jaguars 7–0. **Drive: 4 plays, 30 yards, 1:52.**
- TB – Michael Husted 34-yard field goal, 1:11. Jaguars 7–3. **Drive: 12 plays, 57 yards, 5:36.**

**Second quarter**

- JAX – Fred Taylor 3-yard run (Mike Hollis kick), 11:38. Jaguars 14–3. **Drive: 10 plays, 77 yards, 4:33.**
- TB – Reidel Anthony 47-yard pass from Trent Dilfer (Michael Husted kick), 7:42. Jaguars 14–10. **Drive: 6 plays, 75 yards, 3:56.**
- TB – John Davis 1-yard pass from Trent Dilfer (Michael Husted kick), 0:24. Buccaneers 17–14. **Drive: 8 plays, 51 yards, 1:55.**

**Third quarter**

- JAX – Mike Hollis 31-yard field goal, 10:25. Tied 17–17. **Drive: 5 plays, 21 yards, 1:42.**
- JAX – Mike Hollis 27-yard field goal, 0:31. Jaguars 20–17. **Drive: 10 plays, 42 yards, 4:09.**

**Fourth quarter**

- TB – Reidel Anthony 79-yard pass from Trent Dilfer (Michael Husted kick), 14:47. Buccaneers 24–20. **Drive: 3 plays, 86 yards, 0:44.**
- JAX – Mike Hollis 34-yard field goal, 3:27. Buccaneers 24–23. **Drive: 14 plays, 66 yards, 6:39.**
- JAX – Fred Taylor 70-yard run (run failed), 2:40. Jaguars 29–24. **Drive: 1 play, 70 yards, 0:12.**

Top passers

- TB – Trent Dilfer – 9/23, 189 yards, 3 TD, 2 INT
- JAX – Mark Brunell – 22/37, 248 yards

Top rushers

- TB – Warrick Dunn – 16 rushes, 107 yards
- JAX – Fred Taylor – 20 rushes, 128 yards, 3 TD

Top receivers

- CIN – Reidel Anthony – 2 receptions, 126 yards, 2 TD
- JAX – Jimmy Smith – 7 receptions, 72 yards

==== Week 12: at Pittsburgh Steelers ====
Week Twelve: Jacksonville Jaguars at Pittsburgh Steelers – Game summary

| Quarter | 1 | 2 | 3 | 4 | Total |
|---|---|---|---|---|---|
| Jaguars | 0 | 0 | 7 | 8 | **15** |
| **Steelers** | 7 | 6 | 3 | 14 | **30** |

at Three Rivers Stadium, Pittsburgh, Pennsylvania

- Date: November 22, 1998
- Game time: 4:00 p.m. EST
- Game weather: 51 °F (11 °C)
- Game attendance: 59,124
- Referee: Walt Coleman
- Recap, Game Book

Game information

**First quarter**

- PIT – Dewayne Washington 52-yard interception return (Norm Johnson kick), 7:48. Steelers 7–0.

**Second quarter**

- PIT – Norm Johnson 38-yard field goal, 8:21. Steelers 10–0. **Drive: 11 plays, 59 yards, 6:26.**
- PIT – Norm Johnson 29-yard field goal, 0:04. Steelers 13–0. **Drive: 10 plays, 57 yards, 1:39.**

**Third quarter**

- JAX – Fred Taylor 2-yard run (Mike Hollis kick), 4:07. Steelers 13–7. **Drive: 15 plays, 90 yards, 7:23.**
- PIT – Norm Johnson 41-yard field goal, 0:15. Steelers 16–7. **Drive: 7 plays, 48 yards, 3:52.**

**Fourth quarter**

- PIT – Mark Bruener 9-yard pass from Kordell Stewart (Norm Johnson kick), 8:59. Steelers 23–7. **Drive: 10 plays, 59 yards, 5:36.**
- JAX – Jimmy Smith 33-yard pass from Mark Brunell (pass succeeded), 7:04. Steelers 23–15. **Drive: 6 plays, 70 yards, 1:55.**
- PIT – Dewayne Washington 78-yard interception return (Norm Johnson kick), 0:34. Steelers 30–15.

Top passers

- JAX – Mark Brunell – 18/42, 212 yards, TD, 3 INT
- PIT – Kordell Stewart – 25/36, 208 yards, TD

Top rushers

- JAX – Fred Taylor – 20 rushes, 67 yards, TD
- PIT – Jerome Bettis – 26 rushes, 77 yards

Top receivers

- JAX – Jimmy Smith – 5 receptions, 71 yards, TD
- PIT – Courtney Hawkins – 8 receptions, 80 yards

==== Week 13: at Cincinnati Bengals ====
Week Thirteen: Jacksonville Jaguars at Cincinnati Bengals – Game summary

| Quarter | 1 | 2 | 3 | 4 | Total |
|---|---|---|---|---|---|
| **Jaguars** | 7 | 10 | 10 | 7 | **34** |
| Bengals | 0 | 10 | 7 | 0 | **17** |

at Cinergy Field, Cincinnati, Ohio

- Date: November 29, 1998
- Game time: 1:00 p.m. EST
- Game weather: Partly cloudy, 62 °F (17 °C)
- Game attendance: 55,432
- Referee: Gerry Austin
- Recap, Game Book

Game information

**First quarter**

- JAX – Jimmy Smith 21-yard pass from Mark Brunell (Mike Hollis kick), 3:29. Jaguars 7–0. **Drive: 7 plays, 52 yards, 2:50.**

**Second quarter**

- JAX – Keenan McCardell 8-yard pass from Mark Brunell (Mike Hollis kick), 12:48. Jaguars 14–0. **Drive: 3 plays, 11 yards, 0:39.**
- JAX – Mike Hollis 23-yard field goal, 8:37. Jaguars 17–0. **Drive: 8 plays, 19 yards, 3:58.**
- CIN – Brian Milne 1-yard run (Doug Pelfrey kick), 3:48. Jaguars 17–7. **Drive: 12 plays, 60 yards, 4:49.**
- CIN – Doug Pelfrey 30-yard field goal, 0:00. Jaguars 17–10. **Drive: 4 plays, 35 yards, 0:42.**

**Third quarter**

- JAX – Mike Hollis 47-yard field goal, 11:45. Jaguars 20–10. **Drive: 6 plays, 12 yards, 1:25.**
- CIN – Tony McGee 7-yard pass from Neil O'Donnell (Doug Pelfrey kick), 10:03. Jaguars 20–17. **Drive: 3 plays, 71 yards, 1:42.**
- JAX – Keenan McCardell 3-yard pass from Mark Brunell (Mike Hollis kick), 5:05. Jaguars 27–17. **Drive: 10 plays, 80 yards, 4:58.**

**Fourth quarter**

- JAX – Damon Jones 1-yard pass from Mark Brunell (Mike Hollis kick), 10:14. Jaguars 34–17. **Drive: 9 plays, 83 yards, 4:00.**

Top passers

- JAX – Mark Brunell – 19/35, 244 yards, 4 TD
- CIN – Neil O'Donnell – 20/36, 203 yards, TD, INT

Top rushers

- JAX – George Jones – 13 rushes, 42 yards
- CIN – Corey Dillon – 16 rushes, 107 yards

Top receivers

- JAX – Jimmy Smith – 7 receptions, 110 yards, TD
- CIN – Carl Pickens – 5 receptions, 59 yards

==== Week 14: vs. Detroit Lions ====
Week Fourteen: Detroit Lions at Jacksonville Jaguars – Game summary

| Quarter | 1 | 2 | 3 | 4 | Total |
|---|---|---|---|---|---|
| Lions | 3 | 10 | 3 | 6 | **22** |
| **Jaguars** | 14 | 10 | 3 | 10 | **37** |

at Alltel Stadium, Jacksonville, Florida

- Date: December 6, 1998
- Game time: 1:00 p.m. EST
- Game weather: Sunny, 78 °F (26 °C)
- Game attendance: 70,717
- Referee: Larry Nemmers
- Recap, Game Book

Game information

**First quarter**

- JAX – Keenan McCardell 67-yard pass from Jamie Martin (Mike Hollis kick), 10:56. Jaguars 7–0. **Drive: 2 plays, 63 yards, 1:06.**
- JAX – Fred Taylor 1-yard run (Mike Hollis kick), 6:05. Jaguars 14–0. **Drive: 7 plays, 51 yards, 3:00.**
- DET – Jason Hanson 34-yard field goal, 3:36. Jaguars 14–3. **Drive: 7 plays, 19 yards, 2:29.**

**Second quarter**

- JAX – Mike Hollis 44-yard field goal, 14:08. Jaguars 17–3. **Drive: 9 plays, 54 yards, 4:28.**
- DET – Jason Hanson 24-yard field goal, 6:47. Jaguars 17–6. **Drive: 8 plays, 46 yards, 3:43.**
- JAX – Jimmy Smith 11-yard pass from Jamie Martin (Mike Hollis kick), 1:54. Jaguars 24–6. **Drive: 10 plays, 78 yards, 4:53.**
- DET – Germane Crowell 27-yard pass from Charlie Batch (Jason Hanson kick), 0:35. Jaguars 24–13. **Drive: 6 plays, 60 yards, 1:19.**

**Third quarter**

- DET – Jason Hanson 45-yard field goal, 10:34. Jaguars 24–16. **Drive: 11 plays, 40 yards, 4:26.**
- JAX – Mike Hollis 43-yard field goal, 5:46. Jaguars 27–16. **Drive: 11 plays, 52 yards, 4:48.**

**Fourth quarter**

- JAX – Fred Taylor 11-yard run (Mike Hollis kick), 13:13. Jaguars 34–16. **Drive: 9 plays, 80 yards, 4:29.**
- DET – Herman Moore 20-yard pass from Charlie Batch (pass failed), 10:43. Jaguars 34–22. **Drive: 5 plays, 61 yards, 2:30.**
- JAX – Mike Hollis 30-yard field goal, 3:22. Jaguars 37–22. **Drive: 12 plays, 61 yards, 7:21.**

**Top passers**

- DET – Charlie Batch – 14/33, 250 yards, 2 TD
- JAX – Jamie Martin – 15/23, 228 yards, 2 TD

**Top rushers**

- DET – Barry Sanders – 18 rushes, 102 yards
- JAX – Fred Taylor – 32 rushes, 183 yards, 2 TD

**Top receivers**

- DET – Herman Moore – 7 receptions, 116 yards, TD
- JAX – Jimmy Smith – 7 receptions, 112 yards, TD

==== Week 15: vs. Tennessee Oilers ====
Week Fifteen: Tennessee Oilers at Jacksonville Jaguars – Game summary

| Quarter | 1 | 2 | 3 | 4 | Total |
|---|---|---|---|---|---|
| **Oilers** | 0 | 10 | 0 | 6 | **16** |
| Jaguars | 10 | 0 | 0 | 3 | **13** |

at Alltel Stadium, Jacksonville, Florida

- Date: December 13, 1998
- Game time: 1:00 p.m. EST
- Game weather: 73 °F (23 °C)
- Game attendance: 65,657
- Referee: Phil Luckett
- TV announcers (CBS): Gus Johnson & Steve Tasker
- Recap, Game Book

Game information

**First quarter**

- JAX – Mike Hollis 21-yard field goal, 8:16. Jaguars 3–0. **Drive: 10 plays, 64 yards, 5:35.**
- JAX – Fred Taylor 1-yard run (Mike Hollis kick), 7:09. Jaguars 10–0. **Drive: 1 play, 22 yards, 0:10.**

**Second quarter**

- TEN – Jackie Harris 4-yard pass from Steve McNair (Al Del Greco kick), 11:54. Jaguars 10–7. **Drive: 6 plays, 55 yards, 2:56.**
- TEN – Al Del Greco 28-yard field goal, 1:57. Tied 10–10. **Drive: 6 plays, 32 yards, 2:44.**

**Third quarter**

- No scoring plays

**Fourth quarter**

- TEN – Al Del Greco 30-yard field goal, 14:47. Oilers 13–10. **Drive: 11 plays, 68 yards, 5:08.**
- JAX – Mike Hollis 29-yard field goal, 6:44. Tied 13–13. **Drive: 14 plays, 55 yards, 8:03.**
- TEN – Al Del Greco 41-yard field goal, 0:04. Oilers 16–13. **Drive: 10 plays, 53 yards, 2:15.**

**Top passers**

- TEN – Steve McNair – 22/39, 232 yards, TD, INT
- JAX – Jonathan Quinn – 12/18, 107 yards, INT

**Top rushers**

- TEN – Steve McNair – 11 rushes, 81 yards
- JAX – Fred Taylor – 20 rushes, 42 yards, TD

**Top receivers**

- TEN – Yancey Thigpen – 5 receptions, 68 yards
- JAX – Jimmy Smith – 6 receptions, 103 yards

==== Week 16: at Minnesota Vikings ====
Week Sixteen: Jacksonville Jaguars at Minnesota Vikings – Game summary

| Quarter | 1 | 2 | 3 | 4 | Total |
|---|---|---|---|---|---|
| Jaguars | 0 | 3 | 0 | 7 | **10** |
| **Vikings** | 3 | 9 | 14 | 24 | **50** |

at Hubert H. Humphrey Metrodome, Minneapolis, Minnesota

- Date: December 20, 1998
- Game time: 8:20 p.m. EST
- Game weather: None (indoor stadium)
- Game attendance: 64,363
- Referee: Johnny Grier
- TV announcers (ESPN): Mike Patrick, Joe Theismann & Paul Maguire
- Recap, Game Book

Game information

**First quarter**

- MIN – Gary Anderson 48-yard field goal, 8:31. Vikings 3–0. **Drive: 10 plays, 43 yards, 4:04.**

**Second quarter**

- MIN – Gary Anderson 53-yard field goal, 5:01. Vikings 6–0. **Drive: 6 plays, 14 yards, 2:44.**
- MIN – Andrew Glover 14-yard pass from Randall Cunningham (pass failed), 1:52. Vikings 12–0. **Drive: 5 plays, 48 yards, 1:49.**
- JAX – Mike Hollis 25-yard field goal, 0:00. Vikings 12–3. **Drive: 10 plays, 73 yards, 1:52.**

**Third quarter**

- MIN – Randy Moss 43-yard pass from Randall Cunningham (Gary Anderson kick), 13:57. Vikings 19–3. **Drive: 2 plays, 69 yards, 1:03.**
- MIN – Andrew Glover 14-yard pass from Randall Cunningham (Gary Anderson kick), 3:55. Vikings 26–3. **Drive: 11 plays, 82 yards, 5:13.**

**Fourth quarter**

- MIN – Cris Carter 1-yard pass from Brad Johnson (Gary Anderson kick), 12:38. Vikings 33–3. **Drive: 10 plays, 67 yards, 4:36.**
- MIN – Gary Anderson 44-yard field goal, 7:46. Vikings 36–3. **Drive: 7 plays, 18 yards, 2:50.**
- MIN – Jimmy Hitchcock 30-yard interception return (Gary Anderson kick), 7:25. Vikings 43–3.
- MIN – Chuck Evans 1-yard run (Gary Anderson kick), 6:58. Vikings 50–3. **Drive: 1 play, 1 yard, 0:05.**
- JAX – Pete Mitchell 1-yard pass from Jonathan Quinn (Mike Hollis kick), 2:56. Vikings 50–10. **Drive: 9 plays, 80 yards, 4:02.**

**Top passers**

- JAX – Jonathan Quinn – 12/27, 88 yards, TD, 2 INT
- MIN – Randall Cunningham – 16/30, 210 yards, 3 TD

**Top rushers**

- JAX – Fred Taylor – 23 rushes, 105 yards
- MIN – Robert Smith – 19 rushes, 101 yards

**Top receivers**

- JAX – Fred Taylor – 4 receptions, 25 yards
- MIN – Randy Moss – 3 receptions, 72 yards, TD

==== Week 17: vs. Pittsburgh Steelers ====
Week Seventeen: Pittsburgh Steelers at Jacksonville Jaguars – Game summary

| Quarter | 1 | 2 | 3 | 4 | Total |
|---|---|---|---|---|---|
| Steelers | 0 | 3 | 0 | 0 | **3** |
| **Jaguars** | 0 | 14 | 7 | 0 | **21** |

at Alltel Stadium, Jacksonville, Florida

- Date: December 28
- Game time: 8:25 p.m. EST
- Game weather: Foggy, 55 °F (13 °C)
- Game attendance: 75,087
- Referee: Bill Carollo
- Recap, Game Book

Game information

**First quarter**

- No scoring plays.

**Second quarter**

- PIT – Norm Johnson 24-yard field goal, 13:10. Steelers 3–0. **Drive: 13 plays, 86 yards, 5:49.**
- JAX – Jonathan Quinn 15-yard run (Mike Hollis kick), 8:22. Jaguars 7–3. **Drive: 2 plays, 65 yards, 0:55.**
- JAX – Fred Taylor 9-yard pass from Jonathan Quinn (Mike Hollis kick), 3:04. Jaguars 14–3. **Drive: 7 plays, 86 yards, 3:34.**

**Third quarter**

- JAX – Fred Taylor 12-yard run (Mike Hollis kick), 11:38. Jaguars 21–3. **Drive: 2 plays, 54 yards, 0:37.**

**Fourth quarter**

- No scoring plays.

Top passers

- PIT – Kordell Stewart – 17/37, 174 yards, 2 INT
- JAX – Jonathan Quinn – 10/19, 192 yards, TD

Top rushers

- PIT – Jerome Bettis – 26 rushes, 139 yards
- JAX – Fred Taylor – 21 rushes, 71 yards, TD

Top receivers

- PIT – Charles Johnson – 4 receptions, 61 yards
- JAX – Keenan McCardell – 3 receptions, 85 yards

=== Standings ===
AFC Central
| | W | L | T | PCT | PF | PA | STK |
|---|---|---|---|---|---|---|---|
| ^{(3)} Jacksonville Jaguars | 11 | 5 | 0 | .688 | 392 | 338 | W1 |
| Tennessee Oilers | 8 | 8 | 0 | .500 | 330 | 320 | L2 |
| Pittsburgh Steelers | 7 | 9 | 0 | .438 | 263 | 303 | L5 |
| Baltimore Ravens | 6 | 10 | 0 | .375 | 269 | 335 | W1 |
| Cincinnati Bengals | 3 | 13 | 0 | .188 | 268 | 452 | L1 |

== Postseason ==
=== Schedule ===
| Round | Date | Opponent | Result | Record | Venue | Attendance |
|---|---|---|---|---|---|---|
| Wild Card | January 3, 1999 | New England Patriots (6) | W 25–10 | 1–0 | Alltel Stadium | 71,139 |
| Divisional | January 10, 1999 | at New York Jets (2) | L 24–34 | 1–1 | The Meadowlands | 78,817 |

=== Game summaries ===
==== AFC Wild Card Playoffs: vs. (6) New England Patriots ====
AFC Wild Card Playoffs: (6) New England Patriots at (3) Jacksonville Jaguars – Game summary

| Quarter | 1 | 2 | 3 | 4 | Total |
|---|---|---|---|---|---|
| Patriots | 0 | 0 | 7 | 3 | 10 |
| Jaguars | 6 | 6 | 0 | 13 | 25 |

at Alltel Stadium, Jacksonville, Florida

- Date: January 3, 1999
- Game time: 12:35 p.m. EST
- Game weather: 60 °F (16 °C)
- Game attendance: 71,139
- Referee: Ron Blum
- Recap, Game Book

Game information

First quarter

- JAX – Mike Hollis 35-yard field goal, 8:57. Jaguars 3–0. Drive: 8 plays, 22 yards, 3:51.

Second quarter

- JAX – Mike Hollis 24-yard field goal, 2:01. Jaguars 6–0. Drive: 8 plays, 60 yards, 3:19.
- JAX – Fred Taylor 13-yard run (run failed), 5:58. Jaguars 12–0. Drive: 9 plays, 68 yards, 4:21.
- NE – Robert Edwards 1-yard run (Adam Vinatieri kick), 14:48. Jaguars 12–7. Drive: 17 plays, 85 yards, 8:48.

Third quarter

- NE – Adam Vinatieri 27-yard field goal, 14:48. Jaguars 12–10. Drive: 8 plays, 45 yards, 3:03.

Fourth quarter

- JAX – Jimmy Smith 37-yard pass from Mark Brunell (Mike Hollis kick), 12:24. Jaguars 19–10. Drive: 6 plays, 70 yards, 2:24.
- JAX – Mike Hollis 34-yard field goal, 5:52. Jaguars 22–10. Drive: 4 plays, 9 yards, 1:30.
- JAX – Mike Hollis 21-yard field goal, 1:4. Jaguars 25–10. Drive: 7 plays, 17 yards, 2:39.

Top passers

- NE – Scott Zolak – 21/44, 190 yards, INT
- JAX – Mark Brunell – 14/34, 161 yards, TD

Top rushers

- NE – Robert Edwards – 17 rushes, 28 yards, TD
- JAX – Fred Taylor – 33 rushes, 162 yards, TD

Top receivers

- NE – Troy Brown – 4 receptions, 46 yards
- JAX – Keenan McCardell – 6 receptions, 72 yards

Fred Taylor runs for 162 yards and a touchdown on 31 carries. The Patriots had just 206 total yards and the Jaguars defense forced three turnovers.

==== AFC Divisional Playoffs: at (2) New York Jets ====
AFC Divisional Playoffs: (3) Jacksonville Jaguars at (2) New York Jets – Game summary

| Quarter | 1 | 2 | 3 | 4 | Total |
|---|---|---|---|---|---|
| Jaguars | 0 | 7 | 7 | 10 | 24 |
| Jets | 7 | 10 | 14 | 3 | 34 |

at The Meadowlands, East Rutherford, New Jersey

- Date: January 10, 1999
- Game time: 12:40 p.m. EST
- Game weather: Mostly sunny, 26 °F (−3 °C)
- Game attendance: 78,817
- Referee: Bob McElwee
- TV announcers (CBS): Verne Lundquist, Randy Cross, and Michele Tafoya
- Recap, Game Book

Game information

First quarter

- NYJ – Keyshawn Johnson 21-yard pass from Vinny Testaverde (John Hall kick), 10:26. Jets 7–0. Drive: 7 plays, 70 yards, 4:34.

Second quarter

- NYJ – John Hall 52-yard field goal, 10:35. Jets 10–0. Drive: 13 plays, 59 yards, 5:43.
- NYJ – Keyshawn Johnson 10-yard run (John Hall kick), 0:33. Jets 17–0. Drive: 11 plays, 65 yards, 4:36.
- JAX – Jimmy Smith 52-yard pass from Mark Brunell (Mike Hollis kick), 0:00. Jets 17–7. Drive: 3 plays, 63 yards, 0:33.

Third quarter

- NYJ – Curtis Martin 1-yard run (John Hall kick), 9:13. Jets 24–7. Drive: 7 plays, 40 yards, 3:06.
- JAX – Keenan McCardell 3-yard pass from Mark Brunell (Mike Hollis kick), 8:08. Jets 24–14. Drive: 4 plays, 4 yards, 1:05.
- NYJ – Curtis Martin 1-yard run (John Hall kick), 2:16. Jets 31–14. Drive: 9 plays, 70 yards, 5:52.

Fourth quarter

- JAX – Jimmy Smith 19-yard pass from Mark Brunell (Mike Hollis kick), 9:58. Jets 31–21. Drive: 8 plays, 64 yards, 3:30.
- JAX – Mike Hollis 37-yard field goal, 6:38. Jets 31–24. Drive: 7 plays, 22 yards, 2:20.
- NYJ – John Hall 30-yard field goal, 0:24. Jets 34–24. Drive: 4 plays, -4 yards, 1:35.

Top passers

- JAX – Mark Brunell – 12/31, 156 yards, 3 TD, 3 INT
- NYJ – Vinny Testaverde – 24/36, 284 yards, TD, INT

Top rushers

- JAX – Fred Taylor – 20 rushes, 86 yards
- NYJ – Curtis Martin – 36 rushes, 124 yards, 2 TD

Top receivers

- JAX – Jimmy Smith – 5 receptions, 104 yards, 2 TD
- NYJ – Keyshawn Johnson – 9 receptions, 121 yards, TD

Mark Brunell throws for three touchdowns but completes just 12 of 31 passes with three interceptions. The Jaguars committed four turnovers.

== Awards and records ==
- Mark Brunell, Franchise Record (tied), Most Touchdown Passes in One Game, 4 Passes (November 29, 1998)
- Mark Brunell, Franchise Record, Most Touchdown Passes in One Season, 20 Passes (November 29, 1998)
- Fred Taylor, Franchise Record, Most Touchdowns in One Season, 17 Touchdowns
