= 1997 Jacksonville Jaguars season =

3rd season in franchise history

- Owner: Wayne Weaver
- Head coach: Tom Coughlin
- Offensive coordinator: Chris Palmer
- Defensive coordinator: Dick Jauron
- Home stadium: Alltel Stadium

Results
- Record: 11–5
- Division place: 2nd AFC Central
- Playoffs: Lost Wild Card Playoffs (at Broncos) 17–42
- Pro Bowlers: T Tony Boselli; QB Mark Brunell; WR Jimmy Smith; P Bryan Barker; K Mike Hollis

Uniform

The 1997 season was the Jacksonville Jaguars' 3rd season in the National Football League (NFL) and their 3rd season under the leadership of general manager and head coach Tom Coughlin. The team looked to reach the AFC Championship for the second straight year following a surprising run in 1996. The Jaguars improved upon their previous 9-7 record and won 11 games. They made the playoffs as a wild card team, playing the Denver Broncos on the road for the second straight year. This time they lost to the Broncos 42–17, bringing the Jaguars’ season to an end.

The team also made several changes to the uniforms. They changed the numbers to new font style numbers and added black side panels to the uniforms. During the offseason, the team had changed the font style numbers on the jerseys to a skinnier style with a black drop shadow in the back of the numbers. During the team's 1997 preseason games there were several complaints that the announcers and the viewers had a hard time recognizing the numbers on the players, so the team decided to make the jersey numbers wider and removed the drop shadow numbers by the beginning of the regular season.

== Offseason ==
=== NFL draft ===
1997 Jacksonville Jaguars draft
| Round | Pick | Player | Position | College | Notes |
| 1 | 21 | Renaldo Wynn | Defensive tackle | Notre Dame | |
| 2 | 50 | Mike Logan | Cornerback | West Virginia | |
| 3 | 79 | James Hamilton | Linebacker | North Carolina | |
| 4 | 114 | Seth Payne | Defensive tackle | Cornell | |
| 5 | 147 | Damon Jones | Tight end | Southern Illinois | |
| 6 | 184 | Daimon Shelton | Running back | Sacramento State | |
| 7 | 221 | Jon Hesse | Linebacker | Nebraska | |
Made roster † Pro Football Hall of Fame * Made at least one Pro Bowl during career

=== Undrafted free agents ===
1997 Undrafted free agents of note
| Player | Position | College |
|---|---|---|
| Curtis Anderson | Cornerback | Pittsburgh |
| Jamie Baisley | Linerbacker | Indiana |
| Isaac Curtis | Tight end | Kentucky |
| Kevin Devine | Cornerback | California |
| Todd Fordham | Tackle | Florida State |
| Lance Funderburk | Quarterback | Valdosta State |
| James Kidd | Wide receiver | Colorado |
| Jabbar Threats | Defensive end | Michigan State |

== Staff ==
1997 Jacksonville Jaguars staff
| Front office: Chairman/president/chief executive officer – Wayne Weaver; Senior vice president of football operations – Michael Huyghue; Director of college scouting – Rick Reiprish; Director of pro personnel – Ron Hill; Assistant director of pro personnel – Fran Foley; College scout – Louis Clark; College scout – Gene Smith; College scout – Rick Mueller; Head coaches: Head coach – Tom Coughlin; Offensive coaches: Offensive coordinator/quarterbacks – Chris Palmer; Running backs – Jerald Ingram; Wide receivers – Pete Carmichael; Tight ends – Fred Hoaglin; Offensive line – Mike Maser | Defensive coaches: Defensive coordinator – Dick Jauron; Defensive line – John Pease; Linebackers – Steve Szabo; Outside linebackers – Lucious Selmon; Defensive backs/secondary – Randy Edsall; Special teams coaches: Special teams coordinator – Larry Pasquale; Assistant special teams – Joe Baker; Strength and conditioning: Strength and conditioning – Jerry Palmieri; Assistant strength and conditioning – Jeff Hurd |

== Final roster ==
1997 Jacksonville Jaguars roster
| Quarterbacks (QB): 8 Mark Brunell; 11 Rob Johnson; 16 Steve Matthews; Running backs (RB): 49 Ty Hallock FB; 23 Randy Jordan; 20 Natrone Means; 31 Daimon Shelton FB; 33 James Stewart; Wide receivers (WR): 84 Reggie Barlow PR; 80 Willie Jackson KR; 87 Keenan McCardell; 81 Will Moore; 82 Jimmy Smith; Tight ends (TE): 86 Derek Brown; 85 Rich Griffith LS; 88 Damon Jones; 83 Pete Mitchell | Offensive linemen (OL): 71 Tony Boselli T; 62 Ben Coleman G/T; 73 Brian DeMarco G; 78 Todd Fordham T; 68 Mark Nori G; 67 Jeff Novak G; 72 Leon Searcy T; 76 Rich Tylski G; 79 Dave Widell; Defensive linemen (DL): 90 Tony Brackens DE; 56 Jeff Lageman DE; 91 Seth Payne DT; 96 Clyde Simmons DE; 99 Joel Smeenge DE; 98 Jabbar Threats DE; 93 Esera Tuaolo DT; 95 Jose White DT; 97 Renaldo Wynn DT | Linebackers (LB): 52 Brant Boyer; 54 James Hamilton OLB; 51 Kevin Hardy OLB; 57 Jeff Kopp OLB; 50 Eddie Robinson OLB; 58 Bryan Schwartz MLB; Defensive backs (DB): 25 Curtis Anderson CB; 21 Aaron Beasley CB; 45 Travis Davis SS; 26 Kevin Devine CB; 27 Deon Figures CB; 28 Dana Hall SS; 37 Chris Hudson FS; 32 Mike Logan FS; 29 Ricky Parker FS; 41 Dave Thomas CB; Special teams (ST): 4 Bryan Barker P; 1 Mike Hollis K | Practice squad: 75 Harold Gragg DE; 59 Tyrone Hines LB; 35 Malcolm Thomas RB; 65 Craig Warren T; Reserve: 63 Michael Cheever C (IR); 92 Don Davey DT (IR); 64 John Jurkovic DT (IR); 55 Tom McManus LB (IR); 39 Chris Parker RB (IR); 94 Kelvin Pritchett DT (IR); Rookies in italics 53 active, 6 reserve, 4 practice squad |

== Preseason ==
| Week | Date | Opponent | Result | Record | Stadium |
|---|---|---|---|---|---|
| 1 | August 3 | Carolina Panthers | W 23–9 | 1–0 | Jacksonville Municipal Stadium |
| 2 | August 9 | at New York Giants | W 38–10 | 2–0 | Giants Stadium |
| 3 | August 18 | at San Francisco 49ers | W 28–20 | 3–0 | 3Com Park |
| 4 | August 22 | at Atlanta Falcons | W 26–17 | 4–0 | Jacksonville Municipal Stadium |

== Regular season ==
=== Schedule ===
| Week | Date | Opponent | Result | Record | Venue | Attendance |
|---|---|---|---|---|---|---|
| 1 | August 31 | at **Baltimore Ravens** | **W** 28–27 | 1–0 | Memorial Stadium | 61,018 |
| 2 | September 7 | New York Giants | **W** 40–13 | 2–0 | Alltel Stadium | 70,581 |
| 3 | Bye | | | | | |
| 4 | September 22 | **Pittsburgh Steelers** | **W** 30–21 | 3–0 | Alltel Stadium | 73,016 |
| 5 | September 28 | at Washington Redskins | **L** 12–24 | 3–1 | Jack Kent Cooke Stadium | 74,421 |
| 6 | October 5 | **Cincinnati Bengals** | **W** 21–13 | 4–1 | Alltel Stadium | 67,128 |
| 7 | October 12 | Philadelphia Eagles | **W** 38–21 | 5–1 | Alltel Stadium | 69,150 |
| 8 | October 19 | at Dallas Cowboys | **L** 22–26 | 5–2 | Texas Stadium | 64,464 |
| 9 | October 26 | at **Pittsburgh Steelers** | **L** 17–23 (OT) | 5–3 | Three Rivers Stadium | 57,011 |
| 10 | November 2 | at **Tennessee Oilers** | **W** 30–24 | 6–3 | Liberty Bowl Memorial Stadium | 27,208 |
| 11 | November 9 | Kansas City Chiefs | **W** 24–10 | 7–3 | Alltel Stadium | 70,444 |
| 12 | November 16 | **Tennessee Oilers** | **W** 17–9 | 8–3 | Alltel Stadium | 70,070 |
| 13 | November 23 | at **Cincinnati Bengals** | **L** 26–31 | 8–4 | Cinergy Field | 55,158 |
| 14 | November 30 | **Baltimore Ravens** | **W** 29–27 | 9–4 | Alltel Stadium | 63,712 |
| 15 | December 7 | New England Patriots | **L** 20–26 | 9–5 | Alltel Stadium | 73,446 |
| 16 | December 14 | at Buffalo Bills | **W** 20–14 | 10–5 | Rich Stadium | 41,231 |
| 17 | December 21 | at Oakland Raiders | **W** 20–9 | 11–5 | Oakland Coliseum | 40,032 |

Note: Intra-division opponents are in bold text.

=== Game summaries ===
==== Week 1: at Baltimore Ravens ====
Week One: Jacksonville Jaguars at Baltimore Ravens – Game summary

| Quarter | 1 | 2 | 3 | 4 | Total |
|---|---|---|---|---|---|
| **Jaguars** | 14 | 7 | 0 | 7 | **28** |
| Ravens | 0 | 17 | 7 | 3 | **27** |

at Memorial Stadium, Baltimore, Maryland

- Date: August 31, 1997
- Game time: 4:05 p.m. EST
- Game weather: Partly cloudy, 84 °F (29 °C)
- Game attendance: 61,018
- Referee: Dale Hamer
- Recap, Game Book

Game information

**First quarter**

- JAX – Rob Johnson 25-yard run (Mike Hollis kick), 10:17. Jaguars 7–0. **Drive: 8 plays, 84 yards, 4:43.**
- JAX – Natrone Means 1-yard run (Mike Hollis kick), 2:14. Jaguars 14–0. **Drive: 12 plays, 93 yards, 6:12.**

**Second quarter**

- BAL – Jermaine Lewis 17-yard pass from Vinny Testaverde (Matt Stover kick), 13:16. Jaguars 14–7. **Drive: 7 plays, 76 yards, 3:58.**
- BAL – Jermaine Lewis 42-yard pass from Vinny Testaverde (Matt Stover kick), 7:16. Tied 14–14. **Drive: 8 plays, 74 yards, 4:24.**
- JAX – Jimmy Smith 20-yard pass from Rob Johnson (Mike Hollis kick), 1:08. Jaguars 21–14. **Drive: 5 plays, 34 yards, 1:12.**
- BAL – Matt Stover 33-yard field goal, 0:00. Jaguars 21–17. **Drive: 6 plays, 58 yards, 1:08.**

**Third quarter**

- BAL – Michael Jackson 54-yard pass from Vinny Testaverde (Matt Stover kick), 13:58. Ravens 24–21. **Drive: 3 plays, 56 yards, 1:02.**

**Fourth quarter**

- BAL – Matt Stover 25-yard field goal, 8:46. Ravens 27–21. **Drive: 13 plays, 60 yards, 6:10.**
- JAX – Jimmy Smith 28-yard pass from Rob Johnson (Mike Hollis kick), 5:47. Jaguars 28–27. **Drive: 5 plays, 80 yards, 2:59.**

Top passers

- JAX – Rob Johnson – 20/24, 294 yards, 2 TD
- BAL – Vinny Testaverde – 24/41, 322 yards, 3 TD, 3 INT

Top rushers

- JAX – Natrone Means – 25 rushes, 67 yards, TD
- BAL – Earnest Byner – 14 rushes, 63 yards

Top receivers

- JAX – Jimmy Smith – 6 receptions, 106 yards, 2 TD
- BAL – Michael Jackson – 8 receptions, 143 yards, TD

==== Week 2: vs. New York Giants ====
Week Two: New York Giants at Jacksonville Jaguars – Game summary

| Quarter | 1 | 2 | 3 | 4 | Total |
|---|---|---|---|---|---|
| Giants | 7 | 0 | 6 | 0 | **13** |
| **Jaguars** | 0 | 20 | 3 | 17 | **40** |

at Alltel Stadium, Jacksonville, Florida

- Date: September 7, 1997
- Game time: 4:05 p.m. EDT
- Game weather: Partly cloudy, 85 °F (29 °C)
- Game attendance: 70,581
- Referee: Dick Hantak
- TV announcers (FOX): Kevin Harlan, Jerry Glanville
- Recap, Game Book

Game information

**First quarter**

- NYG – Tiki Barber 4-yard run (Brad Daluiso kick), 2:29. Giants 7–0. **Drive: 2 plays, 27 yards, 0:54.**

**Second quarter**

- JAX – Mike Hollis 29-yard field goal, 14:14. Giants 7–3. **Drive: 6 plays, 69 yards, 3:15.**
- JAX – James Stewart 1-yard run (Mike Hollis kick), 10:52. Jaguars 10–7. **Drive: 6 plays, 16 yards, 2:59.**
- JAX – Natrone Means 9-yard run (Mike Hollis kick), 3:12. Jaguars 17–7. **Drive: 13 plays, 82 yards, 6:32.**
- JAX – Mike Hollis 52-yard field goal, 0:00. Jaguars 20–7. **Drive: 5 plays, 33 yards, 0:56.**

**Third quarter**

- JAX – Mike Hollis 36-yard field goal, 2:45. Jaguars 23–7. **Drive: 8 plays, 41 yards, 5:27.**
- NYG – Chris Calloway 8-yard pass from Dave Brown (pass failed), 0:30. Jaguars 23–13. **Drive: 4 plays, 72 yards, 2:15.**

**Fourth quarter**

- JAX – Mike Hollis 42-yard field goal, 9:43. Jaguars 26–13. **Drive: 5 plays, 39 yards, 2:53.**
- JAX – Natrone Means 5-yard run (Mike Hollis kick), 5:56. Jaguars 33–13. **Drive: 6 plays, 52 yards, 2:52.**
- JAX – James Stewart 12-yard run (Mike Hollis kick), 1:55. Jaguars 40–13. **Drive: 6 plays, 27 yards, 2:40.**

Top passers

- NYG – Dave Brown – 16/35, 182 yards, TD, INT
- JAX – Steve Matthews – 23/35, 252 yards

Top rushers

- NYG – Tiki Barber – 11 rushes, 17 yards, TD
- JAX – Natrone Means – 24 rushes, 85 yards, 2 TD

Top receivers

- NYG – Tiki Barber – 3 receptions, 43 yards
- JAX – Jimmy Smith – 8 receptions, 117 yards

==== Week 4: vs. Pittsburgh Steelers ====
Week Four: Pittsburgh Steelers at Jacksonville Jaguars – Game summary

| Quarter | 1 | 2 | 3 | 4 | Total |
|---|---|---|---|---|---|
| Steelers | 7 | 0 | 7 | 7 | **21** |
| **Jaguars** | 7 | 10 | 3 | 10 | **30** |

at Alltel Stadium, Jacksonville, Florida

- Date: September 22
- Game time: 9:00 p.m. EDT
- Game weather: Clear, 78 °F (26 °C)
- Game attendance: 73,016
- Referee: Gerry Austin
- Recap, Game Book

Game information

**First quarter**

- JAX – Natrone Means 1-yard run (Mike Hollis kick), 9:48. Jaguars 7–0. **Drive: 10 plays, 68 yards, 5:12.**
- PIT – Kordell Stewart 6-yard run (Norm Johnson kick), 6:10. Tied 7–7. **Drive: 6 plays, 80 yards, 3:38.**

**Second quarter**

- JAX – Jimmy Smith 11-yard pass from Mark Brunell (Mike Hollis kick), 12:36. Jaguars 14–7. **Drive: 9 plays, 38 yards, 5:30.**
- JAX – Mike Hollis 20-yard field goal, 0:04. Jaguars 17–7. **Drive: 8 plays, 33 yards, 1:17.**

**Third quarter**

- PIT – Yancy Thigpen 4-yard pass from Kordell Stewart (Norm Johnson kick), 7:21. Jaguars 17–14. **Drive: 13 plays, 80 yards, 7:39.**
- JAX – Mike Hollis 45-yard field goal, 3:25. Jaguars 20–14. **Drive: 8 plays, 54 yards, 3:56.**

**Fourth quarter**

- PIT – Mark Bruener 1-yard pass from Kordell Stewart (Norm Johnson kick), 14:56. Steelers 21–20. **Drive: 7 plays, 48 yards, 3:29.**
- JAX – Mike Hollis 27-yard field goal, 4:14. Jaguars 23–21. **Drive: 14 plays, 72 yards, 6:14.**
- JAX – Chris Hudson 58-yard blocked field goal return (Mike Hollis kick), 0:00. Jaguars 30–21.

Top passers

- PIT – Kordell Stewart – 11/16, 155 yards, 2 TD, INT
- JAX – Mark Brunell – 24/42, 306 yards, TD

Top rushers

- PIT – Jerome Bettis – 21 rushes, 114 yards
- JAX – Natrone Means – 24 rushes, 40 yards, TD

Top receivers

- PIT – Charles Johnson – 4 receptions, 88 yards
- JAX – Jimmy Smith – 10 receptions, 164 yards, TD

==== Week 5: at Washington Redskins ====
Week Five: Jacksonville Jaguars at Washington Redskins – Game summary

| Quarter | 1 | 2 | 3 | 4 | Total |
|---|---|---|---|---|---|
| Jaguars | 6 | 3 | 3 | 0 | **12** |
| **Redskins** | 0 | 14 | 0 | 10 | **24** |

at Jack Kent Cooke Stadium, Landover, Maryland

- Date: September 28, 1997
- Game time: 1:00 p.m. EST
- Game weather: Cloudy and cool, 62 °F (17 °C)
- Game attendance: 74,421
- Referee: Bill Carollo
- Recap, Game Book

Game information

**First quarter**

- JAX – Mike Hollis 30-yard field goal, 13:16. Jaguars 3–0. **Drive: 4 plays, 3 yards, 1:25.**
- JAX – Mike Hollis 42-yard field goal, 1:34. Jaguars 6–0. **Drive: 13 plays, 52 yards, 6:24.**

**Second quarter**

- JAX – Mike Hollis 25-yard field goal, 12:08. Jaguars 9–0. **Drive: 6 plays, 13 yards, 2:52.**
- WSH – Leslie Shepherd 10-yard pass from Gus Frerotte (Scott Blanton kick), 5:55. Jaguars 9–7. **Drive: 6 plays, 28 yards, 3:16.**
- WSH – Jamie Asher 8-yard pass from Gus Frerotte (Scott Blanton kick), 1:16. Redskins 14–9. **Drive: 7 plays, 37 yards, 3:12.**

**Third quarter**

- JAX – Mike Hollis 47-yard field goal, 3:28. Redskins 14–12. **Drive: 9 plays, 53 yards, 3:59.**

**Fourth quarter**

- WSH – Scott Blanton 41-yard field goal, 11:55. Redskins 17–12. **Drive: 14 plays, 55 yards, 6:33.**
- WSH – Leslie Sheppard 13-yard pass from Gus Frerotte (Scott Blanton kick), 5:48. Redskins 24–12. **Drive: 6 plays, 17 yards, 3:04.**

Top passers

- JAX – Mark Brunell – 16/31, 294 yards, 2 INT
- WSH – Gus Frerotte – 16/24, 244 yards, 3 TD, INT

Top rushers

- JAX – Natrone Means – 18 rushes, 62 yards
- WSH – Terry Allen – 36 rushes, 122 yards

Top receivers

- JAX – Jimmy Smith – 4 receptions, 52 yards
- WSH – Leslie Shepherd – 4 receptions, 52 yards, 2 TD

==== Week 6: vs. Cincinnati Bengals ====
Week Six: Cincinnati Bengals at Jacksonville Jaguars – Game summary

| Quarter | 1 | 2 | 3 | 4 | Total |
|---|---|---|---|---|---|
| Bengals | 0 | 7 | 6 | 0 | **13** |
| **Jaguars** | 7 | 0 | 7 | 7 | **21** |

at Alltel Stadium, Jacksonville, Florida

- Date: October 5, 1997
- Game time: 1:00 p.m. EDT
- Game weather: Partly cloudy, 83 °F (28 °C)
- Game attendance: 67,128
- Referee: Tom White
- Recap, Game Book

Game information

**First quarter**

- JAX – Ty Hallock 10-yard pass from Mark Brunell (Mike Hollis kick), 4:44. Jaguars 7–0. **Drive: 3 plays, 20 yards, 1:16.**

**Second quarter**

- CIN – Ki-Jana Carter 1-yard run (Doug Pelfrey kick), 3:09. Tied 7–7. **Drive: 12 plays, 80 yards, 5:59.**

**Third quarter**

- JAX – James Stewart 7-yard pass from Mark Brunell (Mike Hollis kick), 11:08. Jaguars 14–7. **Drive: 9 plays, 69 yards, 3:52.**
- CIN – Jeff Blake 8-yard run (kick failed), 4:16. Jaguars 14–13. **Drive: 10 plays, 72 yards, 6:52.**

**Fourth quarter**

- JAX – Willie Jackson 12-yard pass from Mark Brunell (Mike Hollis kick), 8:49. Jaguars 21–13. **Drive: 11 plays, 84 yards, 5:43.**

Top passers

- CIN – Jeff Blake – 16/27, 232 yards
- JAX – Mark Brunell – 14/27, 164 yards, 3 TD

Top rushers

- CIN – Jeff Blake – 11 rushes, 75 yards, TD
- JAX – Natrone Means – 15 rushes, 75 yards

Top receivers

- CIN – Carl Pickens – 3 receptions, 53 yards
- JAX – Jimmy Smith – 4 receptions, 57 yards

==== Week 7: vs. Philadelphia Eagles ====
Week Seven: Philadelphia Eagles at Jacksonville Jaguars – Game summary

| Quarter | 1 | 2 | 3 | 4 | Total |
|---|---|---|---|---|---|
| Eagles | 0 | 7 | 0 | 14 | **21** |
| **Jaguars** | 21 | 0 | 7 | 10 | **38** |

at Alltel Stadium, Jacksonville, Florida

- Date: October 12, 1997
- Game time: 1:00 p.m. EST
- Game weather: 77 °F (25 °C)
- Game attendance: 69,150
- Recap

Game information

**First quarter**

- JAX – James Stewart 7-yard run (Mike Hollis kick), 10:58. Jaguars 7–0. **Drive: 8 plays, 80 yards, 4:02.**
- JAX – James Stewart 8-yard run (Mike Hollis kick), 4:02. Jaguars 14–0. **Drive: 6 plays, 82 yards, 3:22.**
- JAX – James Stewart 2-yard run (Mike Hollis kick), 1:42. Jaguars 21–0. **Drive: 3 plays, 11 yards, 1:08.**

**Second quarter**

- PHI – Irving Fryar 34-yard pass from Ty Detmer (Chris Boniol kick), 4:41. Jaguars 21–7. **Drive: 9 plays, 69 yards, 5:20.**

**Third quarter**

- JAX – James Stewart 1-yard run (Mike Hollis kick), 3:29. Jaguars 28–7. **Drive: 3 plays, 38 yards, 1:31.**

**Fourth quarter**

- JAX – James Stewart 1-yard run (Mike Hollis kick), 12:26. Jaguars 35–7. **Drive: 6 plays, 31 yards, 2:44.**
- PHI – Irving Fryar 9-yard pass from Rodney Peete (Chris Boniol kick), 5:39. Jaguars 35–14. **Drive: 13 plays, 65 yards, 6:47.**
- PHI – Irving Fryar 15-yard pass from Rodney Peete (Chris Boniol kick), 2:36. Jaguars 35–21. **Drive: 5 plays, 54 yards, 3:03.**
- JAX – Mike Hollis 38-yard field goal, 0:55. Jaguars 38–21. **Drive: 6 plays, 11 yards, 1:41.**

Top passers

- PHI – Ty Detmer – 15/27, 202 yards, TD, INT
- JAX – Mark Brunell – 14/19, 153 yards

Top rushers

- PHI – Ricky Watters – 15 rushes, 44 yards
- JAX – James Stewart – 15 rushes, 102 yards, 5 TD

Top receivers

- PHI – Irving Fryar – 10 receptions, 124 yards, 3 TD
- JAX – Keenan McCardell – 4 receptions, 64 yards

==== Week 8: at Dallas Cowboys ====
Week Eight: Jacksonville Jaguars at Dallas Cowboys – Game summary

| Quarter | 1 | 2 | 3 | 4 | Total |
|---|---|---|---|---|---|
| Jaguars | 7 | 0 | 7 | 8 | **22** |
| **Redskins** | 3 | 10 | 6 | 7 | **26** |

at Texas Stadium, Irving, Texas

- Date: October 19, 1997
- Game time: 1:00 p.m. EST
- Game weather: Clear skies, 72 °F (22 °C)
- Game attendance: 64,464
- Referee: Mike Carey
- Recap, Game Book

Game information

**First quarter**

- DAL – Richie Cunningham 37-yard field goal, 6:39. Cowboys 3–0. **Drive: 14 plays, 59 yards, 8:21.**
- JAX – Jimmy Smith 7-yard pass from Mark Brunell (Mike Hollis kick), 0:51. Jaguars 7–3. **Drive: 9 plays, 79 yards, 5:48.**

**Second quarter**

- DAL – Emmitt Smith 1-yard run (Richie Cunningham kick), 6:36. Cowboys 10–7. **Drive: 9 plays, 71 yards, 4:27.**
- DAL – Richie Cunningham 21-yard field goal, 1:11. Cowboys 13–7. **Drive: 9 plays, 54 yards, 3:38.**

**Third quarter**

- DAL – Stepfret Williams 2-yard pass from Troy Aikman (pass failed), 7:41. Cowboys 19–7. **Drive: 12 plays, 60 yards, 5:12.**
- JAX – Keenan McCardell 5-yard pass from Mark Brunell (Mike Hollis kick), 3:22. Cowboys 19–14. **Drive: 8 plays, 70 yards, 4:19.**

**Fourth quarter**

- JAX – Derek Brown 2-yard pass from Mark Brunell (pass succeeded), 9:06. Jaguars 22–19. **Drive: 13 plays, 66 yards, 6:32.**
- DAL – Herschel Walker 64-yard pass from Troy Aikman (Richie Cunningham kick), 6:27. Cowboys 26–22. **Drive: 5 plays, 76 yards, 2:39.**

Top passers

- JAX – Mark Brunell – 21/31, 242 yards, 3 TD, INT
- DAL – Troy Aikman – 21/32, 262 yards, 2 TD

Top rushers

- JAX – James Stewart – 17 rushes, 40 yards
- DAL – Emmitt Smith – 24 rushes, 75 yards, TD

Top receivers

- JAX – Keenan McCardell – 7 receptions, 120 yards, TD
- DAL – Herschel Walker – 4 receptions, 88 yards, TD

==== Week 9: at Pittsburgh Steelers ====
Week Nine: Jacksonville Jaguars at Pittsburgh Steelers – Game summary

| Quarter | 1 | 2 | 3 | 4 | OT | Total |
|---|---|---|---|---|---|---|
| Jaguars | 0 | 10 | 0 | 7 | 0 | **17** |
| **Steelers** | 0 | 0 | 7 | 10 | 6 | **23** |

at Three Rivers Stadium, Pittsburgh, Pennsylvania

- Date: October 26, 1997
- Game time: 4:00 p.m. EST
- Game weather: 46 °F (8 °C)
- Game attendance: 57,011
- Recap

Game information

**First quarter**

- No scoring plays.

**Second quarter**

- JAX – Willie Jackson 8-yard pass from Mark Brunell (Mike Hollis kick), 14:08. Jaguars 7–0. **Drive: 7 plays, 43 yards, 2:16.**
- JAX – Mike Hollis 20-yard field goal, 6:24. Jaguars 10–0. **Drive: 10 plays, 81 yards, 5:09.**

**Third quarter**

- PIT – Courtney Hawkins 28-yard pass from Kordell Stewart (Norm Johnson kick), 8:09. Jaguars 10–7. **Drive: 7 plays, 80 yards, 4:00.**

**Fourth quarter**

- PIT – Kordell Stewart 1-yard run (Norm Johnson kick), 12:21. Steelers 14–10. **Drive: 15 plays, 92 yards, 8:48.**
- JAX – Pete Mitchell 3-yard pass from Mark Brunell (Mike Hollis kick), 8:13. Jaguars 17–14. **Drive: 4 plays, 16 yards, 0:45.**
- PIT – Norm Johnson 19-yard field goal, 2:21. Tied 17–17. **Drive: 12 plays, 71 yards, 5:52.**

**Overtime**

- PIT – Jerome Bettis 17-yard pass from Kordell Stewart (Norm Johnson kick), 9:14. Steelers 23–17. **Drive: 9 plays, 78 yards, 6:46.**

Top passers

- JAX – Mark Brunell – 15/30, 214 yards, 2 TD
- PIT – Kordell Stewart – 25/42, 317 yards, 2 TD, INT

Top rushers

- JAX – James Stewart – 16 rushes, 39 yards
- PIT – Jerome Bettis – 28 rushes, 99 yards

Top receivers

- JAX – Willie Jackson – 3 receptions, 64 yards, TD
- PIT – Yancey Thigpen – 11 receptions, 196 yards

==== Week 10: at Tennessee Oilers ====
Week Ten: Jacksonville Jaguars at Tennessee Oilers – Game summary

| Quarter | 1 | 2 | 3 | 4 | Total |
|---|---|---|---|---|---|
| **Jaguars** | 17 | 7 | 3 | 3 | **30** |
| Oilers | 7 | 3 | 7 | 7 | **24** |

at Liberty Bowl Memorial Stadium, Memphis, Tennessee

- Date: November 2, 1997
- Game time: 4:00 p.m. EST
- Game weather: 55 °F (13 °C)
- Game attendance: 27,208
- Recap

Game information

**First quarter**

- TEN – Darryll Lewis 47-yard interception return (Al Del Greco kick). Oilers 7–0.
- JAX – Mike Hollis 30-yard field goal. Oilers 7–3. **Drive: 16 plays, 68 yards.**
- JAX – Chris Hudson 32-yard fumble return (Mike Hollis kick). Jaguars 10–7.
- JAX – Pete Mitchell 6-yard pass from Mark Brunell (Mike Hollis kick). Jaguars 17–7. **Drive: 4 plays, 19 yards.**

**Second quarter**

- TEN – Al Del Greco 36-yard field goal. Jaguars 17–10. **Drive: 8 plays, 51 yards.**
- JAX – Mark Brunell 6-yard run (Mike Hollis kick). Jaguars 24–10. **Drive: 5 plays, 45 yards.**

**Third quarter**

- JAX – Mike Hollis 30-yard field goal. Jaguars 27–10. **Drive: 7 plays, 17 yards.**
- TEN – Rodney Thomas 6-yard run (Al Del Greco kick). Jaguars 27–17. **Drive: 7 plays, 65 yards.**

**Fourth quarter**

- JAX – Mike Hollis 37-yard field goal. Jaguars 30–17. **Drive: 6 plays, 54 yards.**
- TEN – Eddie George 5-yard run (Al Del Greco kick). Jaguars 30–24. **Drive: 2 plays, 23 yards.**

Top passers

- JAX – Mark Brunell – 17/31, 169 yards, TD, INT
- TEN – Steve McNair – 13/22, 211 yards, INT

Top rushers

- JAX – James Stewart – 17 rushes, 99 yards
- TEN – Eddie George – 17 rushes, 51 yards, TD

Top receivers

- JAX – Jimmy Smith – 5 receptions, 50 yards
- TEN – Willie Davis – 4 receptions, 83 yards

==== Week 11: vs. Kansas City Chiefs ====
Week Eleven: Kansas City Chiefs at Jacksonville Jaguars – Game summary

| Quarter | 1 | 2 | 3 | 4 | Total |
|---|---|---|---|---|---|
| Chiefs | 0 | 3 | 0 | 7 | **10** |
| **Jaguars** | 7 | 17 | 0 | 0 | **24** |

at Alltel Stadium, Jacksonville, Florida

- Date: November 7, 1997
- Game time: 1:00 p.m. EST
- Game weather: 54 °F (12 °C)
- Game attendance: 70,444
- Referee: Jerry Markbreit
- Recap, Game Book

Game information

**First quarter**

- JAX – Pete Mitchell 5-yard pass from Mark Brunell (Mike Hollis kick), 11:30. Jaguars 7–0. **Drive: 6 plays, 52 yards, 3:30.**

**Second quarter**

- JAX – James Stewart 1-yard run (Mike Hollis kick), 13:03. Jaguars 14–0. **Drive: 5 plays, 93 yards, 2:37.**
- KC – Pete Stoyanovich 45-yard field goal, 11:00. Jaguars 14–3. **Drive: 5 plays, 22 yards, 2:03.**
- JAX – Natrone Means 14-yard run (Mike Hollis kick), 6:57. Jaguars 21–3. **Drive: 7 plays, 75 yards, 4:03.**
- JAX – Mike Hollis 52-yard field goal, 1:15. Jaguars 24–3. **Drive: 6 plays, 30 yards, 0:50.**

**Third quarter**

- No scoring plays.

**Fourth quarter**

- KC – Danan Hughes 7-yard fumble return (Pete Stoyanovich kick), 9:49. Jaguars 24–10.

Top passers

- KC – Rich Gannon – 29/50, 314 yards, 2 INT
- JAX – Mark Brunell – 9/20, 199 yards, TD

Top rushers

- KC – Marcus Allen – 3 rushes, 37 yards
- JAX – Natrone Means – 14 rushes, 62 yards, TD

Top receivers

- KC – Tony Gonzalez – 7 receptions, 69 yards
- JAX – Jimmy Smith – 4 receptions, 112 yards

==== Week 12: vs. Tennessee Oilers ====
Week Twelve: Tennessee Oilers at Jacksonville Jaguars – Game summary

| Quarter | 1 | 2 | 3 | 4 | Total |
|---|---|---|---|---|---|
| Oilers | 0 | 3 | 0 | 6 | **9** |
| **Jaguars** | 0 | 7 | 7 | 3 | **17** |

at Alltel Stadium, Jacksonville, Florida

- Date: November 16, 1997
- Game time: 1:00 p.m. EST
- Game weather: 56 °F (13 °C)
- Game attendance: 70,070
- Recap

Game information

**First quarter**

- No scoring plays.

**Second quarter**

- JAX – Keenan McCardell 17-yard pass from Mark Brunell (Mike Hollis kick), 4:20. Jaguars 7–0. **Drive: 5 plays, 58 yards, 2:15.**
- TEN – Al Del Greco 35-yard field goal, 0:30. Jaguars 7–3. **Drive: 5 plays, 22 yards, 2:03.**

**Third quarter**

- JAX – Natrone Means 1-yard run (Mike Hollis kick), 7:15. Jaguars 14–3. **Drive: 9 plays, 65 yards, 3:37.**

**Fourth quarter**

- TEN – Frank Wycheck 5-yard pass from Willie Davis (run failed), 12:41. Jaguars 14–9. **Drive: 5 plays, 54 yards, 2:25.**
- JAX – Mike Hollis 23-yard field goal, 7:17. Jaguars 17–9. **Drive: 9 plays, 64 yards, 5:24.**

Top passers

- TEN – Steve McNair – 8/22, 162 yards, 2 INT
- JAX – Mark Brunell – 22/30, 267 yards, TD

Top rushers

- TEN – Rodney Thomas – 9 rushes, 54 yards
- JAX – Natrone Means – 23 rushes, 64 yards, TD

Top receivers

- KC – Frank Wycheck – 3 receptions, 70 yards, TD
- JAX – Jimmy Smith – 8 receptions, 158 yards

==== Week 13: at Cincinnati Bengals ====
Week Thirteen: Jacksonville Jaguars at Cincinnati Bengals – Game summary

| Quarter | 1 | 2 | 3 | 4 | Total |
|---|---|---|---|---|---|
| Jaguars | 7 | 3 | 13 | 3 | **26** |
| **Bengals** | 21 | 7 | 3 | 0 | **31** |

at Cinergy Field, Cincinnati, Ohio

- Date: November 23, 1997
- Game time: 4:00 p.m. EST
- Game weather: 39 °F (4 °C)
- Game attendance: 55,158
- Recap

Game information

**First quarter**

- CIN – Ki-Jana Carter 1-yard run (Doug Pelfrey kick), 9:03. Bengals 7–0. **Drive: 13 plays, 63 yards, 5:57.**
- CIN – Tony McGee 9-yard pass from Boomer Esiason (Doug Pelfrey kick), 7:13. Bengals 14–0. **Drive: 4 plays, 20 yards, 1:43.**
- JAX – Pete Mitchell 24-yard pass from Mark Brunell (Mike Hollis kick), 1:13. Bengals 14–7. **Drive: 5 plays, 65 yards, 1:42.**
- CIN – Corey Dillon 3-yard run (Doug Pelfrey kick), 0:49. Bengals 21–7. **Drive: 2 plays, 3 yards, 0:24.**

**Second quarter**

- CIN – Darnay Scott 11-yard pass from Boomer Esiason (Doug Pelfrey kick), 2:14. Bengals 28–7. **Drive: 17 plays, 97 yards, 8:14.**
- JAX – Mike Hollis 21-yard field goal, 0:00. Bengals 28–10. **Drive: 11 plays, 86 yards, 2:14.**

**Third quarter**

- JAX – Mike Hollis 35-yard field goal, 11:29. Jaguars 28–13. **Drive: 7 plays, 55 yards, 3:31.**
- JAX – Natrone Means 5-yard run (Mike Hollis kick), 9:56. Bengals 28–20. **Drive: 1 play, 50 yards, 0:15.**
- CIN – Doug Pelfrey 20-yard field goal, 4:54. Bengals 31–20. **Drive: 12 plays, 57 yards, 5:02.**
- JAX – Mike Hollis 35-yard field goal, 2:02. Bengals 31–23. **Drive: 6 plays, 61 yards, 2:52.**

**Fourth quarter**

- JAX – Mike Hollis 25-yard field goal, 9:12. Bengals 31–26. **Drive: 7 plays, 20 yards, 3:02.**

Top passers

- JAX – Mark Brunell – 20/33, 286 yards, TD, INT
- CIN – Boomer Esiason – 26/36, 211 yards, 2 TD

Top rushers

- JAX – Natrone Means – 19 rushes, 96 yards, TD
- CIN – Corey Dillon – 26 rushes, 88 yards, TD

Top receivers

- JAX – Keenan McCardell – 8 receptions, 109 yards
- CIN – Corey Dillon – 5 receptions, 48 yards

==== Week 14: vs. Baltimore Ravens ====
Week Fourteen: Baltimore Ravens at Jacksonville Jaguars – Game summary

| Quarter | 1 | 2 | 3 | 4 | Total |
|---|---|---|---|---|---|
| Ravens | 7 | 7 | 0 | 13 | **27** |
| **Jaguars** | 3 | 13 | 3 | 10 | **29** |

at Alltel Stadium, Jacksonville, Florida

- Date: November 30, 1997
- Game time: 1:00 p.m. EST
- Game weather: 71 °F (22 °C)
- Game attendance: 63,712
- Recap

Game information

**First quarter**

- BAL – Antonio Langham 40-yard interception return (Matt Stover kick). Ravens 7–0.
- JAX – Mike Hollis 41-yard field goal. Ravens 7–3. **Drive: 10 plays, 53 yards.**

**Second quarter**

- BAL – Jermaine Lewis 15-yard pass from Vinny Testaverde (Matt Stover kick). Ravens 14–3. **Drive: 9 plays, 73 yards.**
- JAX – Natrone Means 3-yard run (Mike Hollis kick). Ravens 14–10. **Drive: 6 plays, 64 yards.**
- JAX – Mike Hollis 42-yard field goal. Ravens 14–13. **Drive: 6 plays, 25 yards.**
- JAX – Mike Hollis 32-yard field goal. Jaguars 16–14. **Drive: 7 plays, 53 yards.**

**Third quarter**

- JAX – Damon Jones 26-yard pass from Mark Brunell (Mike Hollis kick). Jaguars 23–14. **Drive: 7 plays, 74 yards.**
- JAX – Mike Hollis 29-yard field goal. Jaguars 26–14. **Drive: 11 plays, 56 yards.**

**Fourth quarter**

- JAX – Mike Hollis 22-yard field goal. Jaguars 29–14. **Drive: 15 plays, 60 yards.**
- BAL – Kenyon Cotton 1-yard run (Matt Stover kick). Jaguars 29–21. **Drive: 7 plays, 72 yards.**
- BAL – Eric Green 7-yard pass from Eric Zeier (run failed). Jaguars 29–27. **Drive: 12 plays, 69 yards.**

Top passers

- BAL – Vinny Testaverde – 11/17, 101 yards, TD
- JAX – Mark Brunell – 22/40, 317 yards, TD, INT

Top rushers

- BAL – Earnest Byner – 6 rushes, 26 yards
- JAX – James Stewart – 9 rushes, 40 yards

Top receivers

- BAL – James Roe – 4 receptions, 80 yards
- JAX – Keenan McCardell – 7 receptions, 97 yards

==== Week 15: vs. New England Patriots ====
Week Fifteen: New England Patriots at Jacksonville Jaguars – Game summary

| Quarter | 1 | 2 | 3 | 4 | Total |
|---|---|---|---|---|---|
| **Patriots** | 13 | 7 | 3 | 3 | **26** |
| Jaguars | 0 | 7 | 0 | 13 | **20** |

at Alltel Stadium, Jacksonville, Florida

- Date: December 7, 1997
- Game time: 1:00 p.m. EST
- Game weather: 43 °F (6 °C)
- Game attendance: 73,446
- Recap

Game information

**First quarter**

- NE – Adam Vinatieri 44-yard field goal. Patriots 3–0. **Drive: 8 plays, 42 yards.**
- NE – Troy Brown 9-yard pass from Drew Bledsoe (Adam Vinatieri kick). Patriots 10–0. **Drive: 4 plays, 48 yards.**
- NE – Adam Vinatieri 41-yard field goal. Patriots 13–0. **Drive: 4 plays, 3 yards.**

**Second quarter**

- JAX – Keenan McCardell 20-yard pass from Mark Brunell (Mike Hollis kick). Patriots 13–7. **Drive: 8 plays, 53 yards.**
- NE – Ben Coates 5-yard pass from Drew Bledsoe (Adam Vinatieri kick). Patriots 20–7. **Drive: 9 plays, 78 yards.**

**Third quarter**

- NE – Adam Vinatieri 33-yard field goal. Patriots 23–7. **Drive: 9 plays, 44 yards.**

**Fourth quarter**

- JAX – Keenan McCardell 12-yard pass from Mark Brunell (pass failed). Patriots 23–13. **Drive: 10 plays, 80 yards.**
- NE – Adam Vinatieri 39-yard field goal. Patriots 26–13. **Drive: 7 plays, 18 yards.**
- JAX – Reggie Barlow 92-yard kickoff return (Mike Hollis kick). Patriots 26–20.

Top passers

- NE – Drew Bledsoe – 26/35, 234 yards, 2 TD
- JAX – Mark Brunell – 25/42, 251 yards, 2 TD

Top rushers

- NE – Dave Meggett – 5 rushes, 22 yards
- JAX – Natrone Means – 15 rushes, 51 yards

Top receivers

- NE – Vincent Brisby – 4 receptions, 58 yards
- JAX – Keenan McCardell – 11 receptions, 152 yards, 2 TD

==== Week 16: at Buffalo Bills ====
Week Sixteen: Jacksonville Jaguars at Buffalo Bills – Game summary

| Quarter | 1 | 2 | 3 | 4 | Total |
|---|---|---|---|---|---|
| **Jaguars** | 7 | 7 | 3 | 3 | **20** |
| Bills | 0 | 3 | 0 | 11 | **14** |

at Rich Stadium, Orchard Park, New York

- Date: December 14, 1997
- Game time: 1:00 p.m. EST
- Game weather: 30 °F (−1 °C)
- Game attendance: 41,231
- Recap

Game information

**First quarter**

- JAX – Mark Brunell 13-yard run (Mike Hollis kick), 10:10. Jaguars 7–0. **Drive: 3 plays, 75 yards, 1:30.**

**Second quarter**

- JAX – Natrone Means 2-yard run (Mike Hollis kick), 12:50. Jaguars 14–0. **Drive: 11 plays, 88 yards, 6:29.**
- BUF – Steve Christie 38-yard field goal, 0:02. Jaguars 14–3. **Drive: 8 plays, 24 yards, 0:41.**

**Third quarter**

- JAX – Mike Hollis 19-yard field goal, 9:41. Jaguars 17–3. **Drive: 10 plays, 68 yards, 5:19.**

**Fourth quarter**

- BUF – Steve Christie 31-yard field goal, 14:08. Jaguars 17–6. **Drive: 14 plays, 79 yards, 5:48.**
- JAX – Antowain Smith 1-yard run (pass succeeded), 8:03. Jaguars 17–14. **Drive: 9 plays, 80 yards, 2:53.**
- JAX – Mike Hollis 47-yard field goal, 4:18. Jaguars 20–14. **Drive: 8 plays, 45 yards, 3:45.**

Top passers

- JAX – Mark Brunell – 24/32, 317 yards, INT
- BUF – Todd Collins – 13/26, 107 yards

Top rushers

- JAX – Natrone Means – 22 rushes, 74 yards, TD
- BUF – Antowain Smith – 15 rushes, 70 yards, TD

Top receivers

- JAX – Keenan McCardell – 6 receptions, 94 yards
- BUF – Eric Moulds – 6 receptions, 80 yards

==== Week 17: at Oakland Raiders ====
Week Seventeen: Jacksonville Jaguars at Oakland Raiders – Game summary

| Quarter | 1 | 2 | 3 | 4 | Total |
|---|---|---|---|---|---|
| **Jaguars** | 14 | 0 | 0 | 6 | **20** |
| Raiders | 0 | 3 | 6 | 0 | **9** |

at Oakland-Alameda County Coliseum, Oakland, California

- Date: December 21, 1997
- Game time: 4:00 p.m. EST
- Game weather: 52 °F (11 °C)
- Game attendance: 40,032
- Recap

Game information

**First quarter**

- JAX – Keenan McCardell 35-yard pass from Mark Brunell (Mike Hollis kick), 8:13. Jaguars 7–0. **Drive: 8 plays, 73 yards, 3:50.**
- JAX – Damon Jones 26-yard pass from Mark Brunell (Mike Hollis kick), 2:43. Jaguars 14–0. **Drive: 5 plays, 80 yards, 2:05.**

**Second quarter**

- OAK – Cole Ford 33-yard field goal, 5:53. Jaguars 14–3. **Drive: 16 plays, 66 yards, 8:54.**

**Third quarter**

- OAK – Rickey Dudley 2-yard pass from Jeff George (pass failed), 7:06. Jaguars 14–9. **Drive: 11 plays, 55 yards, 6:06.**

**Fourth quarter**

- JAX – Mike Hollis 19-yard field goal, 12:55. Jaguars 17–9. **Drive: 13 plays, 92 yards, 6:35.**
- JAX – Mike Hollis 23-yard field goal, 5:00. Jaguars 20–9. **Drive: 12 plays, 60 yards, 4:48.**

Top passers

- JAX – Mark Brunell – 18/27, 243 yards, 2 TD
- OAK – Jeff George – 24/37, 244 yards, TD

Top rushers

- JAX – Natrone Means – 18 rushes, 80 yards
- OAK – Napoleon Kaufman – 21 rushes, 94 yards

Top receivers

- JAX – Keenan McCardell – 7 receptions, 116 yards, TD
- OAK – Tim Brown – 14 receptions, 164 yards

=== Standings ===
AFC Central
| | W | L | T | PCT | PF | PA | STK |
|---|---|---|---|---|---|---|---|
| ^{(2)} Pittsburgh Steelers | 11 | 5 | 0 | .688 | 372 | 307 | L1 |
| ^{(5)} Jacksonville Jaguars | 11 | 5 | 0 | .688 | 394 | 318 | W2 |
| Tennessee Oilers | 8 | 8 | 0 | .500 | 333 | 310 | W1 |
| Cincinnati Bengals | 7 | 9 | 0 | .438 | 355 | 405 | W3 |
| Baltimore Ravens | 6 | 9 | 1 | .406 | 326 | 345 | L1 |

== Postseason ==
=== Schedule ===
| Round | Date | Opponent | Result | Record | Venue | Attendance |
|---|---|---|---|---|---|---|
| Wild Card | December 27, 1997 | at Denver Broncos (4) | L 17–42 | 0–1 | Mile High Stadium | 74,481 |

=== Game summaries ===
==== AFC Wild Card Playoffs: at (4) Denver Broncos ====
AFC Wild Card Playoffs: (5) Jacksonville Jaguars at (4) Denver Broncos – Game summary

| Quarter | 1 | 2 | 3 | 4 | Total |
|---|---|---|---|---|---|
| Jaguars | 0 | 7 | 10 | 0 | 17 |
| Broncos | 14 | 7 | 0 | 21 | 42 |

at Mile High Stadium, Denver, Colorado

- Date: December 27, 1997
- Game time: 2:00 p.m. MST
- Game weather: 44 °F (7 °C)
- Game attendance: 74,481
- Referee: Bernie Kukar
- Recap, Game Book

Game information

First quarter

- DEN – Terrell Davis 2-yard run (Jason Elam kick), 7:39. Broncos 7–0. Drive: 15 plays, 73 yards, 7:21.
- DEN – Rod Smith 43-yard pass from John Elway (Jason Elam kick), 2:37. Broncos 14–0. Drive: 6 plays, 60 yards, 4:07.

Second quarter

- DEN – Terrell Davis 5-yard run (Jason Elam kick), 10:46. Broncos 21–0. Drive: 11 plays, 92 yards, 5:16.
- JAX – Natrone Means 2-yard run (Mike Hollis kick), 5:09. Broncos 21–7. Drive: 9 plays, 79 yards, 5:37.

Third quarter

- JAX – Mike Hollis 38-yard field goal, 13:33. Broncos 21–10. Drive: 4 plays, 7 yards, 1:27.
- JAX – Travis Davis 29-yard blocked punt return (Mike Hollis kick), 9:16. Broncos 21–17.

Fourth quarter

- DEN – Derek Loville 25-yard run (Jason Elam kick) 13:21. Broncos 28–17. Drive: 2 plays, 48 yards, 0:37.
- DEN – Derek Loville 8-yard run (Jason Elam kick), 3:43. Broncos 35–17. Drive: 10 plays, 80 yards, 5:28.
- DEN – Vaughn Hebron 6-yard run (Jason Elam kick), 1:11. Broncos 42–17. Drive: 4 plays, 15 yards, 2:04.

Top passers

- JAX – Mark Brunell – 18/32, 203 yards, INT
- DEN – John Elway – 16/24, 223 yards, TD

Top rushers

- JAX – Natrone Means – 10 rushes, 40 yards
- DEN – Terrell Davis – 31 rushes, 184 yards, 2 TD

Top receivers

- JAX – Keenan McCardell – 6 receptions, 55 yards
- DEN – Rod Smith – 3 receptions, 99 yards, TD

After upsetting the Broncos in the playoffs in the previous year, the Jaguars fell short in the re-match. John Elway lead the Broncos to a 42–17 win over the visiting Jaguars, throwing for 223 yards and a touchdown. Mark Brunell was 18 for 32 for 203 yards, but had no touchdowns on top of an interception. Similar to the year before when the Broncos could not stop Natrone Means and the Jaguars running game, the Jaguars struggled all game to contain the Broncos running attack. Terrell Davis carried 31 times for 184 yards and two touchdowns. Nonetheless, the game was close throughout, as the Broncos led by only 21-17 late in the third quarter. But the Broncos would score 21 unanswered points in the fourth quarter, ending the Jaguars season.

== Awards and records ==
- Mike Hollis, franchise record (tied), most field goals in one game, 5 field goals (November 30, 1997)
- Mike Hollis, franchise record, most field goals in one season (tied), 31 field goals
- Mike Hollis, franchise record, most points in one season, 134 points
- James Stewart, franchise record, most touchdowns in one game, 5 touchdowns (October 12, 1997)
- James Stewart, franchise record, most points in one game, 30 points (October 12, 1997)
