= Bryan Schwartz =

American football player (born 1971)

No. 58
- Position: Linebacker

Personal information
- Born: December 5, 1971 (age 54); St. Lawrence, South Dakota, U.S.
- Listed height: 6 ft 4 in (1.93 m)
- Listed weight: 255 lb (116 kg)

Career information
- High school: Miller (SD)
- College: Augustana (SD)
- NFL draft: 1995: 2nd round, 64th overall pick

Career history
- Jacksonville Jaguars (1995–1999)

Career NFL statistics
- Tackles: 413
- Sacks: 0.5
- Fumble recoveries: 6
- Stats at Pro Football Reference

Bryan Schwartz (born December 5, 1971) is an American former professional football player who was a linebacker in the National Football League (NFL). He was selected by the Jacksonville Jaguars in the second round of the 1995 NFL draft. He played college football at Augustana College. During his senior season, Schwartz was the first Division II player nominated for the Dick Butkus Award, which goes to the nation’s best college linebacker.

In 2002, Schwartz and his wife appeared on an episode of Trading Spaces. Designer Hildi Santo Tomàs covered their wall with over 4,000 wine labels. The Schwartzes—who say they told producers that they don't allow alcohol in their home—were not impressed. They wound up taking one month and $5,000 of their own money to undo Santo Tomás's vision.

Schwartz currently resides in Ponte Vedra Beach, Florida with his wife and seven children.

He is a former pastor at Celebration Church in Jacksonville, Florida and is founder of Family Goals.

== NFL career statistics ==
Legend
**Bold**	Career high

=== Regular season ===
Year	Team	Games		Tackles					Interceptions					Fumbles			
Year	Team	GP	GS	Cmb	Solo	Ast	Sck	TFL	Int	Yds	TD	Lng	PD	FF	FR	Yds	TD
1995	JAX	14	9	**98**	**72**	**26**	0.0	-	0	0	0	0	-	**2**	1	0	0
1996	JAX	4	3	22	19	3	0.0	-	0	0	0	0	-	0	0	0	0
1997	JAX	**16**	**16**	79	58	21	**0.5**	-	0	0	0	0	-	0	1	0	0
1998	JAX	13	12	60	46	14	0.0	-	0	0	0	0	-	**2**	**4**	0	0
1999	JAX	8	0	2	2	0	0.0	0	0	0	0	0	-	1	0	0	0
		55	40	261	197	64	0.5	0	0	0	0	0	-	5	6	0	0

=== Playoffs ===
Year	Team	Games		Tackles					Interceptions					Fumbles			
Year	Team	GP	GS	Cmb	Solo	Ast	Sck	TFL	Int	Yds	TD	Lng	PD	FF	FR	Yds	TD
1997	JAX	1	1	9	**8**	1	0.0	-	0	0	0	0	-	0	0	0	0
1998	JAX	**2**	**2**	**11**	6	**5**	0.0	-	0	0	0	0	-	0	0	0	0
		3	3	20	14	6	0.0	-	0	0	0	0	-	0	0	0	0
