= Mike Logan (American football) =

American football player (born 1974)

No. 32, 31
- Position: Safety

Personal information
- Born: September 15, 1974 (age 52); Pittsburgh, Pennsylvania, U.S.
- Listed height: 6 ft 1 in (1.85 m)
- Listed weight: 211 lb (96 kg)

Career information
- High school: McKeesport Area (McKeesport, Pennsylvania)
- College: West Virginia
- NFL draft: 1997: 2nd round, 50th overall pick

Career history
- Jacksonville Jaguars (1997–2000); Pittsburgh Steelers (2001–2006)

Awards and highlights
- Super Bowl champion (XL)

Career NFL statistics
- Tackles: 314
- Interceptions: 5
- Passes defended: 30
- Forced fumbles: 7
- Stats at Pro Football Reference

Mike V. Logan (born September 15, 1974) is an American former professional football player who was a safety in the National Football League (NFL). He played college football for the West Virginia Mountaineers.

== Early life ==
Logan attended high school at McKeesport Area High School in McKeesport, Pennsylvania. He played football for the Tigers under famed WPIAL coach George Smith.

== College career ==
Logan was a four-year regular at cornerback and one of the most talented return men in WVU history from 1993 to 1996.

Playing for coach Don Nehlen, Logan was one of the best recruits out of Pennsylvania, but his career at West Virginia was limited by breaking the same arm three times. Logan appeared in 37 games, starting 22 during his career, recording 140 tackles, 18 passes broken up, two forced fumbles, eight interceptions and two fumble recoveries.

Logan finished his career ranking seventh in school history with 18 passes broken up (now ranks 15th), fourth in single-season PBU with 11 (now ranks 13th) and sixth in career kick return yardage with 869 yards (now ranks 12th).

As a senior, Logan led the Big East in punt returns (12.4) and ranked second in interceptions (0.45) and PBU (11). He was named to the Football News all-conference team. Logan earned first-team All-Big East honors at cornerback and second-team all-conference recognition as a return specialist.

Logan was a hero in the East Carolina win in 1996, coming through with a first-half interception and then stripping a pass from ECU's Larry Shannon at the WVU eight in the fourth quarter, returning that fumble 25 yards.

As a freshman, in 1993, Logan recovered a Boston College fumble at the WVU 37 yard-line with 2:23 remaining to set up WVU's final scoring drive and then intercepted a Glenn Foley pass in the end zone on the game's last play to preserve WVU's undefeated regular season and a 1994 Sugar Bowl appearance. Logan also played in the 1995 Carquest Bowl and 1997 Gator Bowl.

Logan had a career-best nine tackles in the 21–0 win over Pitt in 1995, had two interceptions in the 13–0 win over Maryland in 1996 and returned a punt for a touchdown in the 30–10 win at Temple in 1996.

He received the Scott Shirley Award in 1993, presented to WVU's top special teams player, and received the Gridiron Gladiator Award in 1996, given for on-field intensity. He is a member of the 1990-99 WVU all-time football team.

His achievements as a Mountaineer and in the NFL earned him induction into the West Virginia Sports Hall of Fame in September 2014.

== Professional career ==
After a college career at West Virginia University, Logan was a second-round draft pick for the Jacksonville Jaguars in 1997. As a rookie, Logan only recorded 15 tackles, but improved his second season to 29 tackles. He recorded his first NFL interception in his final and best season in Jacksonville, 2000. Logan recorded 60 tackles that year, along with his first career sack and two interceptions.

Logan then went to the Pittsburgh Steelers for the 2001 season, bringing him home to play for the team he grew up idolizing. Logan started out slowly his first two years in Pittsburgh, but by the 2003 season he had broken out. Logan had a career-high 94 tackles that year along with a sack. Unlike his previous two seasons of 2001 and 2002, Logan had no interceptions in 2003 (he had two INTs in 2001 and 1 INT in 2002). After being re-signed in 2004, Logan produced a career-worst 8 tackles for the season after suffering a season-ending injury and being placed on the injured reserve list. Logan was a part of the championship Super Bowl XL team for the Steelers beating the Seattle Seahawks and won his first Super Bowl ring. He retired from professional football in 2007.

=== NFL statistics ===
Year	Team	Games	Combined tackles	Tackles	Assisted tackles	Sacks	Forced fumbles	Fumble recoveries	Fumble return yards	Interceptions	Interception return yards	Yards per interception return	Longest interception return	Interceptions returned for touchdown	Passes defended
1997	JAX	11	8	5	3	0.0	0	0	0	0	0	0	0	0	0
1998	JAX	15	18	12	6	0.0	1	1	0	0	0	0	0	0	5
1999	JAX	2	1	0	1	0.0	0	0	0	0	0	0	0	0	1
2000	JAX	15	53	47	6	1.0	1	1	0	2	14	7	14	0	6
2001	PIT	16	37	33	4	2.0	1	1	0	2	2	1	2	0	7
2002	PIT	14	40	30	10	0.5	2	0	0	1	46	46	46	0	8
2003	PIT	16	93	70	23	1.0	1	3	0	0	0	0	0	0	7
2004	PIT	3	7	5	2	0.0	1	0	0	0	0	0	0	0	0
2005	PIT	12	24	16	8	0.0	0	0	0	0	0	0	0	0	1
2006	PIT	12	13	11	2	0.0	0	0	0	0	0	0	0	0	0
Career		116	294	229	65	4.5	7	6	0	5	62	12	46	0	35

== Radio ==
Logan has remained in the Pittsburgh area as a radio personality. He co-hosted the weekday afternoon show "The Drive with Paulsen, Logan & Mack" on 1250 ESPN Radio with Scott Paulsen and Chris Mack until the station went off the air in September 2010.

== Facts ==
- Since the retirement of fellow safety Donnie Shell following the 1987 NFL season, Logan is the only Steelers player to have worn number 31. Although the number is considered unofficially retired by the team, the Steelers likely allowed Logan to wear number 31 because of him idolizing Shell growing up in Pittsburgh.
- Following the Steelers win in Super Bowl XL, Logan responded that he did not want to go to Disney World, but that he wanted Kennywood to open up. Kennywood, which is located in West Mifflin where Logan grew up, is not open during the winter months. He currently resides in Pittsburgh.
