= Travis Davis =

American football player (born 1973)

No. 45, 27
- Position: Safety

Personal information
- Born: January 10, 1973 (age 53); Wilmington, California, U.S.
- Listed height: 6 ft 0 in (1.83 m)
- Listed weight: 203 lb (92 kg)

Career information
- High school: Phineas Banning (Wilmington)
- College: Notre Dame
- NFL draft: 1995: 7th round, 242nd overall pick

Career history
- New Orleans Saints (1995)*; Jacksonville Jaguars (1995–1998); Pittsburgh Steelers (1999)
- * Offseason or practice squad member only

Career NFL statistics
- Tackles: 289
- Interceptions: 6
- Sacks: 3
- Stats at Pro Football Reference

Travis Horace Davis (born January 10, 1973) is an American former professional football player who was a safety in the National Football League (NFL). He was selected by the New Orleans Saints in the seventh round of the 1995 NFL draft. He played college football for the Notre Dame Fighting Irish.

Davis also played for the Pittsburgh Steelers.

== NFL career statistics ==
Legend
	Led the league
**Bold**	Career high

=== Regular season ===
Year	Team	Games		Tackles				Interceptions				Fumbles			
Year	Team	GP	GS	Comb	Solo	Ast	Sck	Int	Yds	TD	Lng	FF	FR	Yds	TD
1995	JAX	9	5	33	26	7	0.0	0	0	0	0	0	1	0	0
1996	JAX	16	7	52	39	13	0.5	**2**	0	0	0	0	2	0	0
1997	JAX	16	16	**93**	**72**	**21**	**2.0**	1	23	0	23	**2**	**3**	10	0
1998	JAX	16	5	51	39	12	0.5	**2**	**34**	0	**34**	0	1	0	0
1999	PIT	16	16	60	45	15	0.0	1	1	0	1	1	1	**102**	**1**
Career		73	49	289	221	68	3.0	6	58	0	34	3	8	112	1

=== Playoffs ===
Year	Team	Games		Tackles				Interceptions				Fumbles			
Year	Team	GP	GS	Comb	Solo	Ast	Sck	Int	Yds	TD	Lng	FF	FR	Yds	TD
1996	JAX	3	1	5	5	0	0.0	0	0	0	0	0	0	0	0
1997	JAX	1	1	**8**	**6**	**2**	0.0	0	0	0	0	0	0	0	0
1998	JAX	2	0	2	2	0	0.0	0	0	0	0	0	0	0	0
Career		6	2	15	13	2	0.0	0	0	0	0	0	0	0	0
