= Seth Payne =

American football player (born 1975)

No. 91
- Position: Defensive tackle

Personal information
- Born: February 12, 1975 (age 51); Clifton Springs, New York, U.S.
- Listed height: 6 ft 4 in (1.93 m)
- Listed weight: 303 lb (137 kg)

Career information
- High school: Victor Senior (Victor, New York)
- College: Cornell
- NFL draft: 1997: 4th round, 114th overall pick
- Expansion draft: 2002: 1st round, 8th overall pick

Career history
- Jacksonville Jaguars (1997–2001); Houston Texans (2002–2006); Jacksonville Jaguars (2007)*
- * Offseason or practice squad member only

Career NFL statistics
- Tackles: 332
- Sacks: 17.5
- Forced fumbles: 2
- Passes defended: 4
- Stats at Pro Football Reference

Seth Copeland Payne (born February 12, 1975) is an American former professional football player who was a defensive tackle in the National Football League (NFL). After his playing career, he became a co-host of a local radio show.

== Early life ==
Payne is descended from a long line of farmers from outside Victor, New York, and went to high school at Victor Senior High School, graduating in 1993. In 1993, he was elected to the All-Greater Rochester and All State teams and also participated in the Eddie Meath All Star Game. He lived with his mother, stepfather, and two siblings.

He played college football at Cornell and was a member of the Sphinx Head Society and Delta Upsilon.

== Football career ==
Payne was originally drafted by the Jacksonville Jaguars in the fourth round of the 1997 NFL draft.

He was selected by the Houston Texans in the 2002 expansion draft. He was selected along with Jaguar teammates Tony Boselli and Gary Walker. The move allowed the Jaguars to be under the salary cap. The move was surprising considering the Texans and Jaguars were in the same division.

On February 28, 2007, the Texans released him. He was signed by the Jaguars on August 18, re-joining the team with which he began his career.

== NFL career statistics ==
Legend
**Bold**	Career high

=== Regular season ===
Year	Team	Games		Tackles				Interceptions				Fumbles			
Year	Team	GP	GS	Comb	Solo	Ast	Sck	Int	Yds	TD	Lng	FF	FR	Yds	TD
1997	JAX	12	5	14	12	2	0.0	0	0	0	0	0	0	0	0
1998	JAX	6	1	11	7	4	0.0	0	0	0	0	0	0	0	0
1999	JAX	16	16	23	14	9	1.5	0	0	0	0	0	0	0	0
2000	JAX	16	14	33	22	11	2.0	0	0	0	0	0	0	0	0
2001	JAX	16	16	55	41	14	**5.0**	0	0	0	0	0	0	0	0
2002	HOU	16	16	**65**	**54**	11	1.0	0	0	0	0	0	0	0	0
2003	HOU	2	2	9	6	3	1.0	0	0	0	0	0	0	0	0
2004	HOU	16	12	51	36	**15**	2.0	0	0	0	0	0	0	0	0
2005	HOU	16	14	59	45	14	4.0	0	0	0	0	**1**	0	0	0
2006	HOU	5	2	12	10	2	1.0	0	0	0	0	**1**	0	0	0
		121	98	332	247	85	17.5	0	0	0	0	2	0	0	0

=== Playoffs ===
Year	Team	Games		Tackles				Interceptions				Fumbles			
Year	Team	GP	GS	Comb	Solo	Ast	Sck	Int	Yds	TD	Lng	FF	FR	Yds	TD
1997	JAX	1	0	**4**	3	**1**	0.0	0	0	0	0	0	0	0	0
1999	JAX	2	1	**4**	**4**	0	0.0	0	0	0	0	0	0	0	0
		3	1	8	7	1	0.0	0	0	0	0	0	0	0	0

== Radio career ==
He co-hosts, with Sean Pendergast, the morning show for SportsRadio 610 called Payne & Pendergast, and hosts a podcast called "The Deceptively Fast Podcast".

== Personal life ==
Seth lives with his wife, Brandi, and their child in Houston, Texas. Payne's brother is Rugby America CEO Dan Payne.
