= Dave Widell =

American football player (born 1965)

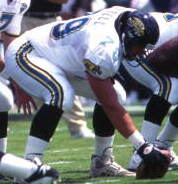
- Widell with the Jacksonville Jaguars in 1995

No. 78, 79
- Positions: Center, tackle, guard

Personal information
- Born: May 14, 1965 (age 61); Hartford, Connecticut, U.S.
- Listed height: 6 ft 7 in (2.01 m)
- Listed weight: 303 lb (137 kg)

Career information
- High school: South Catholic (CT)
- College: Boston College
- NFL draft: 1988: 4th round, 94th overall pick

Career history
- Dallas Cowboys (1988–1989); Denver Broncos (1990–1994); Jacksonville Jaguars (1995–1997); Atlanta Falcons (1998)

Awards and highlights
- All-ECAC (1987)

Career NFL statistics
- Games played: 156
- Games started: 92
- Fumble recoveries: 2
- Stats at Pro Football Reference

David Harold Widell, Jr. (born May 14, 1965) is an American former professional football player who was a guard and tackle in the National Football League (NFL) for the Dallas Cowboys, Denver Broncos, Jacksonville Jaguars, and Atlanta Falcons. He played college football for the Boston College Eagles.

== Early life ==
Widell attended South Catholic High School in Connecticut, where he originally played the trombone in the school band. In football, he played at tight end and nose tackle. He didn't start until his junior season. He received All-state honors at both positions as a senior.

He also was the center for the basketball team.

== College career ==
Widell accepted a football scholarship to play at Boston College. As a redshirt freshman, he was a backup at left tackle. He also was named the Eagles' long snapper on special teams mid-way through the season.

As a sophomore, he was part of a platoon at the center position. In his last 2 seasons, he was named the starter at right tackle.

In 2003, he was inducted into the Boston College Varsity Club Athletic Hall of Fame.

== Professional career ==
Pre-draft measurables
Height	Weight	Hand span	40-yard dash	10-yard split	20-yard split	20-yard shuttle	Vertical jump	Broad jump	Bench press
6 ft 6 3/8 in (1.99 m)	297 lb (135 kg)	10 in (0.25 m)	5.41 s	1.88 s	3.10 s	4.53 s	24.0 in (0.61 m)	8 ft 2 in (2.49 m)	19 reps

=== Dallas Cowboys ===
Widell was selected by the Dallas Cowboys in the fourth round (94th overall) of the 1988 NFL draft. He started at right tackle against the Pittsburgh Steelers while second-year player Kevin Gogan was serving a 30 day suspension, and became just the second rookie in franchise history to start a season opener at offensive tackle (Ralph Neely was the first). Later in the season, injuries to Mark Tuinei and Daryle Smith, allowed him to start 8 game at left tackle.

In 1989, he started 2 contests at right tackle in place of an injured Gogan. From games 10 to 14, he was a part of a platoon with Gogan at right tackle, with Widell being used mostly on passing situations. He missed the season finale with a sprained right knee injury.

On August 24, 1990, he was traded to the Denver Broncos in exchange for a seventh round selection in 1991 (#173-Leon Lett) and an eighth round selection in 1992 (#222-Mike Pawlawski).

=== Denver Broncos ===
In 1990, he joined his brother Doug Widell (who was also his teammate at Boston College) with the Denver Broncos, becoming the first brothers in the NFL's modern era to play together on the same offensive line. He appeared in all 16 games, serving as the long snapper for punts and started at left guard in the final 5 contests.

In 1991, he started two games at left guard, including the season opener against the Cincinnati Bengals. He replaced an injured Keith Kartz as the starting center for the playoff games against the Houston Oilers and the Buffalo Bills.

In 1992, he appeared in all 16 games, starting the season opener at center against the Los Angeles Rams. He also was named the team's long snapper.

In 1993, he started a total of 15 games. He started the first contests at left guard, the next five at center and five of the last six at left guard. He was declared inactive in the fifteenth game against the Tampa Bay Buccaneers. He was the team's long snapper on the punt unit.

In 1994, he started all 16 games at center. Widell only missed one game with the Broncos, while playing at guard, tackle, center and long snapper.

=== Jacksonville Jaguars ===
On March 15, 1995, he signed as a free agent with the Jacksonville Jaguars, reuniting with Tom Coughlin, who was his offensive coordinator as a redshirt freshman in college. He was named the franchise's first starting center.

In 1996, he appeared in 15 games with 14 starts at center. He missed 2 offensive snaps with a sprained knee for the first time as a Jaguar, during the second game against the Houston Oilers. He played the entire fifth game against the Carolina Panthers, despite having a torn meniscus in his right knee. He missed the next game against the New Orleans Saints, while recovering from knee surgery. He did not start in the seventh game against the New York Jets, but still took over at center in the second quarter. He played only in the first offensive series of the divisional playoff game against the Denver Broncos, after suffering a strained left calf, but still remained in the game as the long snapper on the special teams units.

In 1997, he started at center for the first 8 games of the season, before being passed on the depth chart by Michael Cheever. He returned to the starting lineup in the thirteenth game to replace an injured Cheever.

=== Atlanta Falcons ===
On May 11, 1998, Widell signed as a free agent with the Atlanta Falcons, reuniting with Dan Reeves who was his head coach with the Denver Broncos. He was declared inactive in 14 games and played in only one contest. He was also a part of the Atlanta Falcons' Super Bowl XXXIII losing team. He was released on February 17, 1999.
