= Renaldo Wynn =

American football player (born 1974)

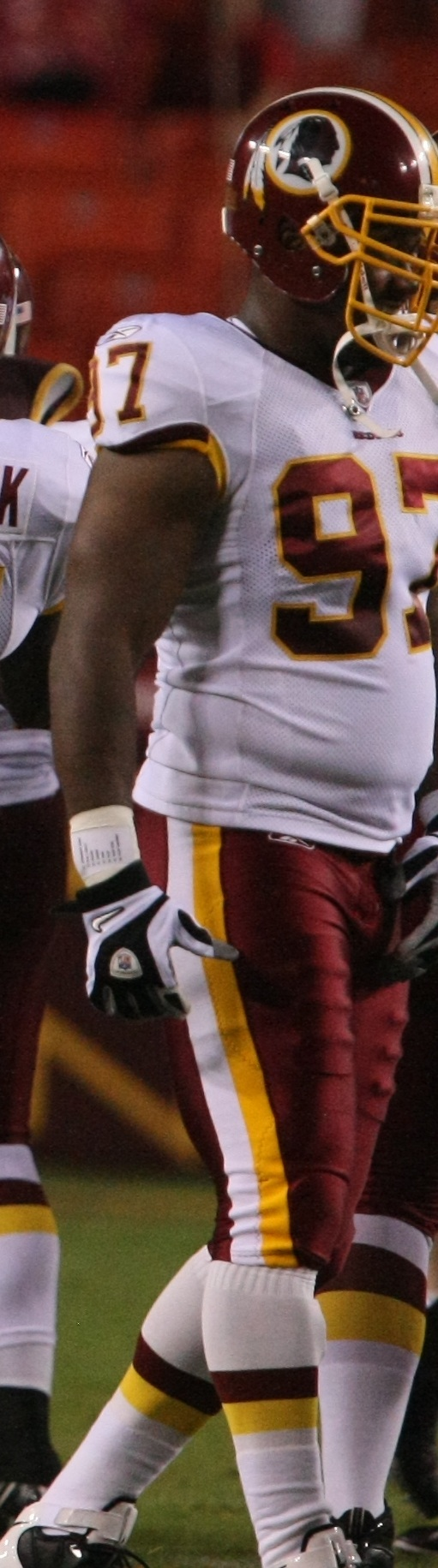
- Wynn with the Washington Redskins in 2009

No. 97, 98, 99, 93
- Position: Defensive end

Personal information
- Born: September 3, 1974 (age 52); Chicago, Illinois, U.S.
- Listed height: 6 ft 3 in (1.91 m)
- Listed weight: 280 lb (127 kg)

Career information
- High school: De La Salle Institute (Chicago)
- College: Notre Dame
- NFL draft: 1997: 1st round, 21st overall pick

Career history
- Jacksonville Jaguars (1997–2001); Washington Redskins (2002–2006); New Orleans Saints (2007); New York Giants (2008); Washington Redskins (2009); Omaha Nighthawks (2010)

Awards and highlights
- PFWA All-Rookie Team (1997); PFW All-Rookie Team (1997)

Career NFL statistics
- Tackles: 348
- Sacks: 27
- Forced fumbles: 5
- Fumble recoveries: 5
- Stats at Pro Football Reference

Renaldo Levalle Wynn (born September 3, 1974) is an American former professional football player who was a defensive end in the National Football League (NFL). He was selected by the Jacksonville Jaguars in the first round of the 1997 NFL draft. He played college football for the Notre Dame Fighting Irish.

Wynn also played for the New Orleans Saints, New York Giants and Washington Redskins.

== Early life ==
Wynn attended De La Salle Institute in Chicago and gained honors as an All-Midwest selection by Tom Lemming's Prep Football Report and All-State second-team choice by the Chicago Tribune. He was team captain; recording 50 tackles with three interceptions and five fumble recoveries as an outside linebacker and rushed for 500 yards with nine touchdowns as a fullback in his senior season. He gained All-Catholic League and All-City honors as a senior. Wynn lettered four years in basketball, averaging 12 points 11 rebounds per game while serving as team captain as a senior. He also received three letters in track, performing in the long jump.

== College career ==
Wynn was recruited by University of Notre Dame in 1992. He was redshirted as a freshman in his first season. During the 1993 season he recorded 19 tackles with three sacks while starting three games at strongside outside linebacker and two games at left defensive end. Wynn played in ten games in 1994, starting the first six at right outside linebacker and four others, including the Fiesta Bowl against the University of Colorado, at left defensive end. Wynn recorded 47 tackles with one sack, four stops for losses, forced two fumbles and recovered another. He gained All-American honorable mention honors as a junior in 1995 by compiling 57 tackles with six stops for losses and leading the team with 6.5 sacks. In 1996, Wynn played left defensive end as a senior, making 61 tackles with nine sacks, six stops for losses, recovered two fumbles and deflected one pass. He was named team's Most Valuable Player and Lineman of the Year as a senior.

== Professional career ==
Pre-draft measurables
Height	Weight	Arm length	Hand span	40-yard dash	10-yard split	20-yard split	20-yard shuttle	Vertical jump	Broad jump	Bench press
6 ft 2 5/8 in (1.90 m)	288 lb (131 kg)	33 7/8 in (0.86 m)	10 1/2 in (0.27 m)	4.83 s	1.69 s	2.82 s	4.29 s	33.0 in (0.84 m)	9 ft 7 in (2.92 m)	28 reps

=== Jacksonville Jaguars ===
Wynn was selected in the first round (21st overall) of the 1997 NFL draft by the Jacksonville Jaguars. In 1997, Wynn was named to All-Rookie teams chosen by Pro Football Writers Association/Pro Football Weekly, Football News and College & Pro Football Newsweekly. He played in all 16 games with eight starts. He finished tenth on the team with 60 tackles, as well as two tackles for a loss, 2.5 sacks, and one fumble recovery. In 1998, he started in the first 15 games of the season at all four defensive line positions. Wynn finished the year with 58 tackles, one sack, and one fumble recovery. During the 1999 season, he started in 10 of 12 games played finishing with 37 tackles, 1.5 sacks, one forced fumble and one fumble recovery. He started the season's final seven games and both playoff games and finished the postseason with five tackles. In 2000, he started 14 games at strongside defensive end compiling 55 tackles, 3.5 sacks, two tackles for a loss, and one forced fumble. In the 2001 season, Wynn ranked sixth on the Jacksonville Jaguars with 75 tackles and tied for fifth with five sacks, both career highs. He started in all 16 games for the first time in his career.

=== Washington Redskins (first stint) ===
Wynn then moved to the Washington Redskins for the 2002 season. He was immediately inserted into the starting lineup at defensive end. He started and played in all 16 games for the second straight season. He posted 42 tackles, recorded 2.5 sacks for 19 yards of loss, three forced fumbles, and one fumble recovery. In 2003, Wynn played and started all 16 games for the third time in his career. He was voted as team captain by his teammates, and Wynn posted 30 tackles and two sacks for the season. During the 2004 season, Wynn had another solid campaign, starting and playing in all 16 games. He recorded 58 tackles and three sacks on the season.

On September 3, 2007, the Redskins released him.

=== New Orleans Saints ===
Wynn then signed with the New Orleans Saints on September 7, 2007. He appeared in 12 games for the Saints that season including one start, recording 13 tackles and 3.5 sacks. He became a free agent in the 2008 offseason.

=== New York Giants ===
In May 2008, Wynn visited with the New York Giants. He agreed to terms on a contract with the team on June 1, 2008. The move reunited him with Giants head coach Tom Coughlin, who was head coach of the Jacksonville Jaguars when Wynn was drafted by the team in 1997.

=== Washington Redskins (second stint) ===
Wynn was re-signed to a one-year contract by the Washington Redskins on March 16, 2009. He was released on October 10 to make room for punter Glenn Pakulak, and was re-signed on October 12 when Pakulak was waived. He was released again on October 17, to make room for Pakulak.

=== Omaha Nighthawks ===
Wynn signed with the Omaha Nighthawks of the United Football League on October 25, 2010.

== NFL career statistics ==
Legend
**Bold**	Career high

=== Regular season ===
Year	Team	Games		Tackles				Interceptions				Fumbles			
Year	Team	GP	GS	Comb	Solo	Ast	Sck	Int	Yds	TD	Lng	FF	FR	Yds	TD
1997	JAX	16	8	28	23	5	2.5	0	0	0	0	0	**1**	0	0
1998	JAX	15	15	34	23	**11**	1.0	0	0	0	0	0	**1**	0	0
1999	JAX	12	10	17	10	7	1.5	0	0	0	0	1	**1**	0	0
2000	JAX	14	14	36	**31**	5	3.5	0	0	0	0	1	0	0	0
2001	JAX	16	16	40	29	**11**	**5.0**	0	0	0	0	1	0	0	0
2002	WAS	16	16	**41**	30	**11**	2.5	0	0	0	0	**2**	**1**	0	0
2003	WAS	16	16	29	22	7	2.0	0	0	0	0	0	0	0	0
2004	WAS	16	16	38	30	8	3.0	0	0	0	0	0	0	0	0
2005	WAS	16	15	31	25	6	0.5	0	0	0	0	0	**1**	0	0
2006	WAS	15	1	15	14	1	0.0	0	0	0	0	0	0	0	0
2007	NOR	12	1	13	12	1	3.5	0	0	0	0	0	0	0	0
2008	NYG	16	0	25	18	7	2.0	0	0	0	0	0	0	0	0
2009	WAS	2	0	1	1	0	0.0	0	0	0	0	0	0	0	0
		182	128	348	268	80	27.0	0	0	0	0	5	5	0	0

=== Playoffs ===
Year	Team	Games		Tackles				Interceptions				Fumbles			
Year	Team	GP	GS	Comb	Solo	Ast	Sck	Int	Yds	TD	Lng	FF	FR	Yds	TD
1997	JAX	1	1	**6**	**6**	0	0.0	0	0	0	0	0	**1**	0	0
1999	JAX	2	2	4	0	**4**	0.0	0	0	0	0	0	0	0	0
2005	WAS	1	1	0	0	0	0.0	0	0	0	0	0	0	0	0
2008	NYG	1	0	0	0	0	0.0	0	0	0	0	0	0	0	0
		5	4	10	6	4	0.0	0	0	0	0	0	1	0	0
