= Lamanzer Williams =

American football player (born 1974)

No. 74, 96
- Position: Defensive end

Personal information
- Born: November 17, 1974 (age 51); Greensboro, Alabama, U.S.
- Listed height: 6 ft 4 in (1.93 m)
- Listed weight: 282 lb (128 kg)

Career information
- High school: Willow Run (Ypsilanti Township, Michigan)
- College: Minnesota
- NFL draft: 1998: 6th round, 179th overall pick

Career history
- Jacksonville Jaguars (1998); Kansas City Chiefs (1999)*; Seattle Seahawks (2000)*; Kansas City Chiefs (2000)*; Minnesota Vikings (2001); St. Louis Rams (2002)*; Berlin Thunder (2003); Miami Dolphins (2003)*
- * Offseason or practice squad member only

Awards and highlights
- First-team All-American (1997); First-team All-Big Ten (1997)
- Stats at Pro Football Reference

Lamanzer Deshan Williams (born November 17, 1974) is an American former professional football player who was a defensive end in the National Football League (NFL). He played briefly for the Jacksonville Jaguars in 1998. Williams played college football for the Minnesota Gophers.
