= Cordell Taylor =

American football player (born 1973)

No. 23, 21, 16
- Position: Cornerback

Personal information
- Born: December 22, 1973 (age 52); Norfolk, Virginia, U.S.
- Listed height: 5 ft 11 in (1.80 m)
- Listed weight: 190 lb (86 kg)

Career information
- High school: Booker T. Washington (Norfolk)
- College: Hampton
- NFL draft: 1998: 2nd round, 57th overall pick

Career history
- Jacksonville Jaguars (1998); Seattle Seahawks (1999); Chicago Bears (1999); Scottish Claymores (2000); Denver Broncos (2001)*; San Francisco Demons (2001); Edmonton Eskimos (2001); Carolina Panthers (2002)*; Edmonton Eskimos (2003)
- * Offseason or practice squad member only

Career NFL statistics
- Tackles: 2
- Stats at Pro Football Reference

Cordell Jerome Taylor (born December 22, 1973) is an American former professional football player who was a cornerback in the National Football League (NFL). Born in Norfolk, Virginia, Taylor attended Hampton University. He was selected in the second round of the 1998 NFL draft with the 57th overall pick. During his short NFL career he was a member of the Jacksonville Jaguars, Seattle Seahawks, and Chicago Bears, though he never played for Chicago. He also played in the Canadian Football League. He is currently a defensive backs coach at his alma mater, Hampton University. He now coaches and is a director of athletics at The Lovett School in Atlanta Georgia.
