= Todd Fordham =

American football player (born 1973)

No. 78, 71
- Position: Offensive tackle

Personal information
- Born: October 9, 1973 (age 53); Atlanta, Georgia, U.S.
- Listed height: 6 ft 6 in (1.98 m)
- Listed weight: 319 lb (145 kg)

Career information
- High school: Tift County (Tifton, Georgia)
- College: Florida State
- NFL draft: 1997: undrafted

Career history
- Jacksonville Jaguars (1997–2000); Denver Broncos (2001)*; Jacksonville Jaguars (2001-2002); Pittsburgh Steelers (2003); Carolina Panthers (2004–2006)
- * Offseason or practice squad member only

Awards and highlights
- National champion (1993); Second-team All-ACC (1996)
- Stats at Pro Football Reference

Lindsey Todd Fordham (born October 9, 1973) is an American former professional football player who was an offensive tackle for 10 seasons in the National Football League (NFL). He played college football for the Florida State Seminoles. He played in the NFL for the Jacksonville Jaguars, Pittsburgh Steelers, and Carolina Panthers.

== Early life ==
Fordham was a first-team 4A All-State selection at defensive end from Tift County High School in Tifton, Georgia. He was named one of the top 12 offensive linemen in Georgia by the Atlanta Journal-Constitution in addition to playing tight end.

== College career ==
He was a four-year letterman at FSU and played in 44 games. As a senior in 1996, Fordham was offensive team captain and started every game at right offensive tackle before moving to right offensive guard for the last two contests. He surrendered just one sack and had a team-high 30 pancake blocks during his senior year, earning All-Atlantic Coast Conference second-team honors. As a junior in 1995, he started every game and did not allow a sack or pressure all year. That play garnered him honorable mention All-ACC recognition.

== Professional career ==
Pre-draft measurables
Height	Weight	Arm length	Hand span	Bench press
6 ft 5 5/8 in (1.97 m)	307 lb (139 kg)	33 3/4 in (0.86 m)	9 1/2 in (0.24 m)	25 reps

Fordham was not drafted out of FSU and signed with the Jacksonville Jaguars in 1997. He was cut and signed to the club's practice squad, then moved up to the active roster later in September 1997. Fordham made his first NFL start for the Jacksonville Jaguars versus the Tennessee Titans in 1998, starting at right guard in place of an injured Rich Tylski. He was active in 10 other contests for special teams during his second season.

He sat out the 1999 season after suffering ligament damage in his left knee during summer camp. In October 2000, he stepped in at right tackle when Zach Wiegert was injured and started the remaining 8 games of the season.

He earned two offensive game balls with Jacksonville from 1997 to 2002 for his performances versus the Seattle Seahawks in 2000 and against the Minnesota Vikings in 2001.

Fordham signed in September 2001 with the Denver Broncos for the 2001 season, but was released before the start of the season. He returned to Jacksonville in October and started the final 12 games of the 2001 season at left tackle for injured Tony Boselli. Fordham would spend the entire 2002 season with the Jaguars, starting nine games at right tackle. For 2003, he signed with the Pittsburgh Steelers and initially won the right tackle job. He would start six games for the Steelers and appear in 11 before being traded to the Carolina Panthers in 2004 exchange for a seventh-round selection in the 2005 NFL draft. He played his remaining three seasons in Carolina, starting eight games and appearing in 47, before retiring in 2007.

For his career, Fordham appeared in 114 games and made 44 starts.

== Personal life ==
Fordham has a BA in business and an MBA in Business Administration from FSU. He also completed the NFL-affiliated University of Pennsylvania - The Wharton School Entrepreneurship Program.

As of 2012, Fordham is a medical sales rep for Arthrex Spine and resides in the Jacksonville area.

Fordham's son, Caden, plays linebacker for the Tampa Bay Buccaneers.
