= Curtis Anderson (American football, born 1973) =

American gridiron football player (born 1973)

No. 25, 23
- Position: Cornerback

Personal information
- Born: September 2, 1973 (age 53); Lynchburg, Virginia, U.S.
- Listed height: 6 ft 0 in (1.83 m)
- Listed weight: 193 lb (88 kg)

Career information
- High school: E.C. Glass (VA)
- College: Pittsburgh
- NFL draft: 1997: undrafted

Career history
- Jacksonville Jaguars (1997); Chicago Bears (1999)*; Tampa Bay Buccaneers (1999)*; Albany Firebirds (2000); B.C. Lions (2001)
- * Offseason or practice squad member only

Career NFL statistics
- Games played: 9
- Stats at Pro Football Reference

Jerome Curtis Anderson (born September 2, 1973) was an American professional football cornerback who played one season for the Jacksonville Jaguars in 1997. He also played for the Albany Firebirds in 2000 and the B.C. Lions in 2001. He went to college at Pittsburgh.
