= Kevin Devine (American football) =

American football player (born 1974)

No. 26, 27
- Position: Cornerback

Personal information
- Born: December 11, 1974 (age 51); Jackson, Mississippi, U.S.
- Listed height: 5 ft 9 in (1.75 m)
- Listed weight: 179 lb (81 kg)

Career information
- High school: Nogales
- College: California
- NFL draft: 1997: undrafted
- Expansion draft: 1999: 1st round, 21st overall pick

Career history
- Jacksonville Jaguars (1997–1998); Cleveland Browns (1999)*; Minnesota Vikings (1999)
- * Offseason or practice squad member only
- Stats at Pro Football Reference

Kevin Devine (born December 11, 1974) is an American former professional football player who was a cornerback for three seasons with the Jacksonville Jaguars and Minnesota Vikings of the National Football League (NFL). He played college football for the California Golden Bears.
