= Will Moore (gridiron football) =

American football player (born 1970)

No. 83, 81
- Position: Wide receiver

Personal information
- Born: February 20, 1970 (age 56); Dallas, Texas, U.S.

Career information
- College: Texas Southern

Career history
- Calgary Stampeders (1992–1994); New England Patriots (1995–1996); Jacksonville Jaguars (1997–1998)

Career statistics
- Receptions: 48
- Receiving yards: 558
- Touchdowns: 1
- Stats at Pro Football Reference

Will Henry Moore III is an American former professional football player who was a wide receiver for seven seasons in the Canadian Football League (CFL) and National Football League (NFL). He played college football for the Texas Southern Tigers. Moore played three seasons in the CFL for the Calgary Stampeders and four seasons in the NFL with the New England Patriots and the Jacksonville Jaguars. He currently lives in Jacksonville, Florida. His best season came in 1995 when he caught 43 balls for 502 yards and one touchdown.
