= Jabbar Threats =

American football player (born 1975)

No. 98, 92
- Position: Defensive end

Personal information
- Born: April 26, 1975 (age 51); Springfield, Ohio, U.S.
- Listed height: 6 ft 5 in (1.96 m)
- Listed weight: 268 lb (122 kg)

Career information
- High school: North (Springfield)
- College: Garden City CC (1993–1994); Michigan State (1995–1996)
- NFL draft: 1997: undrafted

Career history
- Jacksonville Jaguars (1997–1998); Green Bay Packers (1999)*; Scottish Claymores (2000–2001); Kansas City Chiefs (2002)
- * Offseason or practice squad member only

Career NFL statistics
- Tackles: 1
- Stats at Pro Football Reference

Anthayus Jabbar Threats (born April 26, 1975) is an American former professional football player who was a defensive end for the Jacksonville Jaguars of the National Football League (NFL) from 1997 to 1998. He played college football for the Michigan State Spartans.
