= Daimon Shelton =

American football player (born 1972)

No. 31
- Position: Fullback

Personal information
- Born: September 15, 1972 (age 54); Duarte, California, U.S.
- Listed height: 6 ft 0 in (1.83 m)
- Listed weight: 262 lb (119 kg)

Career information
- High school: Duarte
- College: Sacramento State
- NFL draft: 1997: 6th round, 184th overall pick

Career history
- Jacksonville Jaguars (1997–2000); Chicago Bears (2001–2002); Buffalo Bills (2004–2006); San Jose SaberCats (2008)

Career NFL statistics
- Rushing yards: 104
- Rushing average: 2.6
- Rushing touchdowns: 1
- Receptions: 82
- Receiving yards: 571
- Receiving touchdowns: 2
- Stats at Pro Football Reference

Daimon Shelton (born September 15, 1972) is an American former professional football player who was a fullback in the National Football League (NFL). He played college football for the Sacramento State Hornets. Shelton was selected by the Jacksonville Jaguars in the sixth round of the 1997 NFL draft with the 184th overall pick.
