= Damon Jones (American football) =

American football player (born 1974)

No. 88
- Position: Tight end

Personal information
- Born: September 18, 1974 (age 52); Evanston, Illinois, U.S.
- Listed height: 6 ft 5 in (1.96 m)
- Listed weight: 270 lb (122 kg)

Career information
- High school: Evanston
- College: Michigan; Southern Illinois
- NFL draft: 1997: 5th round, 147th overall pick

Career history
- Jacksonville Jaguars (1997–2001)

Career NFL statistics
- Receptions: 41
- Receiving yards: 550
- Touchdowns: 11
- Stats at Pro Football Reference

Damon Jones (born September 18, 1974) is an American former professional football player who played tight end for five seasons for the Jacksonville Jaguars. He was selected with the 147th overall pick in the fifth round of the 1997 NFL draft. Jones was the first tight end selected in the draft by the Jaguars. He attended Evanston Township High School, where he was a star tight end and defensive end, and also a basketball star. Jones is currently the lineman football coach at Jean Ribault High School.
