= James Hamilton (American football) =

American football player (born 1974)

No. 54
- Position: Linebacker

Personal information
- Born: April 17, 1974 (age 52); Hartford, Connecticut, U.S.
- Listed height: 6 ft 5 in (1.96 m)
- Listed weight: 243 lb (110 kg)

Career information
- High school: Richmond (Rockingham, North Carolina)
- College: North Carolina
- NFL draft: 1997: 3rd round, 79th overall pick

Career history
- Jacksonville Jaguars (1997–1998)

Career NFL statistics
- Tackles: 6
- Sacks: 1
- Stats at Pro Football Reference

James Hamilton (born April 17, 1974) is an American former professional football player who was a linebacker for the Jacksonville Jaguars. He was selected in the third round of the 1997 NFL draft. He was often injured and did not record any starts in his two-year NFL career. He played in a total of 16 games over his two seasons.
