= Rich Tylski =

American football player (born 1971)

No. 76, 65
- Position: Guard

Personal information
- Born: February 27, 1971 (age 55); San Diego, California, U.S.
- Listed height: 6 ft 4 in (1.93 m)
- Listed weight: 289 lb (131 kg)

Career information
- High school: Madison (San Diego)
- College: Utah State
- NFL draft: 1994: undrafted

Career history
- New England Patriots (1994)*; Jacksonville Jaguars (1995–1999); Pittsburgh Steelers (2000–2001); New England Patriots (2002)*; Carolina Panthers (2004)
- * Offseason or practice squad member only

Career NFL statistics
- Games played: 95
- Games started: 62
- Stats at Pro Football Reference

Richard Lee Tylski (born February 27, 1971) is an American former professional football player who was a guard and center for seven seasons in the National Football League (NFL), primarily for the Jacksonville Jaguars. He played college football for the Utah State Aggies.

In May 2008, Tylski was placed in a pretrial intervention program after he admitted in court to abusing his adopted daughter. His wife Jane pleaded guilty to one count of aggravated child abuse and was given two years probation.

On February 24, 2010, Tylski and his wife were ordered by a judge to pay $1.25 million to their former adopted daughter.
