= Michael Cheever =

American football player (born 1973)

No. 63
- Position: Center

Personal information
- Born: June 24, 1973 (age 53); Newnan, Georgia, U.S.
- Listed height: 6 ft 4 in (1.93 m)
- Listed weight: 293 lb (133 kg)

Career information
- High school: Newnan
- College: Georgia Tech
- NFL draft: 1996: 2nd round, 60th overall pick

Career history
- Jacksonville Jaguars (1996–1998)

Awards and highlights
- Second-team All-ACC (1995)

Career NFL statistics
- Games played: 17
- Games started: 6
- Stats at Pro Football Reference

Michael John Cheever (born June 24, 1973) is an American former professional football player who was a center in the National Football League (NFL). He played for the Jacksonville Jaguars from 1996 to 1998. He played college football for the Georgia Tech Yellow Jackets. He was selected in the second round of the 1996 NFL draft with the 60th overall pick.

Cheever was forced to retire after a serious back injury.
