= Jacksonville Jaguars all-time roster =

931 players have appeared in at least one regular season or postseason game in the National Football League (NFL) for the Jacksonville Jaguars since 1995. This list is accurate through the end of the 2025 NFL season.

== A ==
- Yasir Abdullah
- Blue Adams
- Tyrell Adams
- Jamal Agnew
- D. J. Alexander
- Dan Alexander
- Eric Alexander
- Gerald Alexander
- Rich Alexis
- Dakota Allen
- David Allen
- LeQuint Allen
- Russell Allen
- Tyson Alualu
- Prince Amukamara
- Curtis Anderson
- Bryan Anger
- Richard Angulo
- Eli Ankou
- Thurston Armbrister
- Arik Armstead
- Ryquell Armstead
- Dan Arnold
- Richard Ash
- Mark Asper
- Tavon Austin
- Akin Ayodele

== B ==
- Jason Babin
- Daniel Baldridge
- Alan Ball
- Tavian Banks
- Joe Banyard
- Luq Barcoo
- Bryan Barker
- Matt Barkley
- Reggie Barlow
- Khalif Barnes
- Lionel Barnes
- Ben Bartch
- Joplo Bartu
- Ainsley Battles
- Kelvin Beachum
- Zane Beadles
- Robert Bean
- Aaron Beasley
- C. J. Beathard
- Blake Bell
- Ricky Bell
- Arrelious Benn
- Michael Bennett
- Kevin Bentley
- Steve Beuerlein
- Tank Bigsby
- Jordan Black
- Ross Blacklock
- Justin Blackmon
- Will Blackmon
- Angelo Blackson
- Willie Blade
- Valentino Blake
- C. J. Board
- Tommy Bohanon
- Juran Bolden
- Brock Bolen
- Breon Borders
- Blake Bortles
- Tony Boselli
- Kyle Bosworth
- Todd Bouman
- Shawn Bouwens
- A. J. Bouye
- Luke Bowanko
- Alvin Bowen
- Danny Boyd
- James Boyd
- Brant Boyer
- Deral Boykin
- Tyron Brackenridge
- Tony Brackens
- Cameron Bradfield
- Kyle Brady
- Andre Branch
- Christian Braswell
- Chandler Brewer
- Mike Brewster
- Eben Britton
- Bobby Brooks
- Bucky Brooks
- John Broussard
- Arthur Brown
- Blair Brown
- C. C. Brown
- Chris Brown
- Delvin Brown
- Derek Brown
- Dyami Brown
- John Brown
- Jonathan Brown
- Malcom Brown
- Mike Brown
- Milford Brown
- Montaric Brown
- Sergio Brown
- Mkristo Bruce
- Mark Brunell
- Taven Bryan
- Fernando Bryant
- Red Bryant
- Kendricke Bullard
- Stephen Burton

== C ==
- Jeremy Cain
- Austin Calitro
- Calais Campbell
- Tevaughn Campbell
- Tommie Campbell
- Tyson Campbell
- A. J. Cann
- Don Carey
- John Carney
- Darren Carrington
- Ahmad Carroll
- Bernard Carter
- Delone Carter
- Jerome Carvin
- Joshua Cephus
- K'Lavon Chaisson
- Corey Chamblin
- D. J. Chark
- Jamaal Charles
- Ike Charlton
- Joseph Charlton
- Martin Chase
- Michael Cheever
- John Chick
- Ryan Christopherson
- Eugene Chung
- Barry Church
- Andre Cisco
- Danny Clark
- Reggie Clark
- Vinnie Clark
- Chris Claybrooks
- Chris Clemons
- Toney Clemons
- Ezra Cleveland
- Colin Cloherty
- Reggie Cobb
- Michael Coe
- Landon Cohen
- Keelan Cole
- Myles Cole
- Ben Coleman
- DJ Coleman
- Drew Coleman
- Marco Coleman
- Stalin Colinet
- Richard Collier
- Nate Collins
- Harry Colon
- Dustin Colquitt
- Aaron Colvin
- Branson Combs
- Chris Combs
- Mike Compton
- Chris Conley
- Snoop Conner
- Dan Connolly
- Sean Considine
- Logan Cooke
- Elijah Cooks
- Deke Cooper
- Marquis Cooper
- Jorge Cordova
- Frank Cornish
- Kamalei Correa
- Quan Cosby
- Doug Costin
- Jeff Cotton
- Nathan Cottrell
- Terry Cousin
- Derek Cox
- Kennard Cox
- Renard Cox
- Jason Craft
- Shadwick Criss
- Zack Crockett
- Coy Cronk
- Richie Cunningham
- Eric Curry
- Jacob Cutrera
- Johnathan Cyprien

== D ==
- DeeJay Dallas
- Tank Daniels
- Ronald Darby
- Marcell Dareus
- Donovin Darius
- Don Davey
- Akeem Davis
- Andre Davis
- Carl Davis
- Cody Davis
- Gabe Davis
- Jim Davis
- Ryan Davis
- Travis Davis
- Tyler Davis
- Sean Dawkins
- Sheldon Day
- Brandon Deaderick
- Josiah Deguara
- Dee Delaney
- Greg DeLong
- Nick DeLuca
- Brian DeMarco
- Seth DeValve
- Kevin Devine
- Matt Dickerson
- Jarett Dillard
- Nate Dingle
- De'Shaan Dixon
- Phillip Dorsett
- Hugh Douglas
- Leger Douzable
- Chad Dukes
- Mike Dumas
- Vaughn Dunbar
- Justin Durant
- Devin Duvernay

== E ==
- Jeremy Ebert
- A. J. Edds
- Terrell Edmunds
- Chuma Edoga
- Marc Edwards
- Trent Edwards
- Troy Edwards
- Tyler Eifert
- Daniel Ekuale
- Ben Ellefson
- Kevin Elliott
- Alex Ellis
- Atiyyah Ellison
- Evan Engram
- Hayden Epstein
- Tyler Ervin
- Greg Estandia
- John Estes
- Travis Etienne
- Josh Evans)

== F ==
- Luke Farrell
- Folorunso Fatukasi
- Greg Favors
- Jay Fiedler
- Deon Figures
- Jamell Fleming
- Derrick Fletcher
- Drayton Florence
- Ereck Flowers
- Tre Flowers
- Nick Foles
- Kai Forbath
- Rudy Ford
- Todd Fordham
- Kynan Forney
- Justin Forsett
- Luke Fortner
- Khairi Fortt
- Javon Foster
- Leonard Fournette
- Dante Fowler
- Brad Franklin
- Stephen Franklin
- Paul Frase
- Chris Fuamatu-Maʻafala
- Jamaal Fudge

== G ==
- Blaine Gabbert
- Dennis Gardeck
- Isaiah Gardner
- David Garrard
- Rashid Gayle
- Joe Gaziano
- Jeremiah George
- Toby Gerhart
- Damon Gibson
- Tony Gilbert
- Marcus Gilchrist
- Jason Gildon
- Joe Giles-Harris
- Tyree Gillespie
- Tashaun Gipson
- Ernest Givins
- Aaron Glenn
- Mike Glennon
- Terry Godwin
- Keith Goganious
- Najee Goode
- Adam Gotsis
- Roger Graham
- Corey Grant
- Deon Grant
- Dwayne Gratz
- Jonas Gray
- Quinn Gray
- B. J. Green
- Brandon Green
- Donny Green
- Rogerick Green
- Courtney Greene
- Rashad Greene
- Nick Greisen
- Shaquill Griffin
- Rich Griffith
- David Grinnage
- Quentin Groves
- Monty Grow
- Winston Guy

== H ==
- Robert Hainsey
- Dana Hall
- Ray Hall
- Ty Hallock
- DaVon Hamilton
- James Hamilton
- Michael Hamlin
- Josh Hammond
- Blake Hance
- Cortez Hankton
- Chris Hanson
- Clay Harbor
- Kevin Hardy
- Chris Harrington
- Chris Harris
- DuJuan Harris
- Jacob Harris
- Jeremy Harris
- Mike Harris
- Nick Harris
- Anton Harrison
- Ronnie Harrison
- Larry Hart
- Derrick Harvey
- Kevin Haslam
- JaMycal Hasty
- Matthew Hatchette
- Stephen Hauschka
- Brent Hawkins
- D. J. Hayden
- Geno Hayes
- Tae Hayes
- Reggie Hayward
- T. J. Heath
- C. J. Henderson
- John Henderson
- Tommy Hendricks
- Chad Henne
- Tre Herndon
- Bronson Hill
- Jason Hill
- Jordan Hill
- Josh Hines-Allen
- Cooper Hodges
- Colin Holba
- Mike Hollis
- Jacob Hollister
- Jaret Holmes
- Torry Holt
- Ziggy Hood
- Davon House
- Chris Howard
- Desmond Howard
- Chris Hudson
- Nate Hughes
- Deon Humphrey
- Travis Hunter
- Wayne Hunter
- Greg Huntington
- Allen Hurns
- Carlos Hyde

== I ==
- Clint Ingram
- Steve Ingram
- Corvey Irvin
- Rod Issac
- Chris Ivory
- Brian Iwuh

== J ==
- Myles Jack
- Chevis Jackson
- Grady Jackson
- Jerrell Jackson
- Lenzie Jackson
- Malik Jackson
- Matthew Jackson
- Willie Jackson
- Leon Jacobs
- Nic Jacobs
- Michael Jacquet
- Jordan Jefferson
- Rayshawn Jenkins
- Rashad Jennings
- Marcel Jensen
- Timmy Jernigan
- Luke Joeckel
- Anthony Johnson
- Antonio Johnson
- Austin Johnson
- Caleb Johnson
- Collin Johnson
- D'Ernest Johnson
- James-Michael Johnson
- Josh Johnson
- Kevin Johnson
- Lyndon Johnson
- Patrick Johnson
- Rob Johnson
- Storm Johnson
- Tommy Johnson
- Tyron Johnson
- Abry Jones
- Brian Jones
- Charles Jones
- Damon Jones
- David Jones
- George Jones
- Greg Jones (born 1981)
- Greg Jones (born 1988)
- Jamir Jones
- Jarrian Jones
- Josh Jones
- Mac Jones
- Marvin Jones
- Matt Jones
- Sidney Jones
- Tim Jones
- Zay Jones
- Maurice Jones-Drew
- Leander Jordan
- Randy Jordan
- Elvis Joseph
- Gregory Junior
- John Jurkovic

== K ==
- Aaron Kampman
- Deji Karim
- Craig Keith
- Jimmy Kennedy
- Cody Kessler
- Arden Key
- Christian Kirk
- Jammie Kirlew
- Jack Kiser
- Sammy Knight
- Terrance Knighton
- Kyle Knox
- Aaron Koch
- Jeff Kopp
- Ben Koyack

== L ==
- Tyler Lacy
- Jeff Lageman
- Carnell Lake
- Josh Lambo
- Kevin Landolt
- Derek Landri
- Dawan Landry
- Austen Lane
- Rayuan Lane III
- Gordon Laro
- Trevor Lawrence
- Nevin Lawson
- Jeremiah Ledbetter
- Marqise Lee
- Ricky Lee
- Byron Leftwich
- Cleo Lemon
- Matt Leonard
- Emarlos Leroy
- Jermaine Lewis
- Jourdan Lewis
- Marcedes Lewis
- Brandon Linder
- Steve Lindsey
- Cam Little
- Walker Little
- Devin Lloyd
- Kevin Lockett
- Michael Lockley
- Ernie Logan
- Mike Logan
- Hunter Long
- Craig Loston
- John Lotulelei
- Kyle Love
- Omare Lowe
- Reggie Lowe
- Dwight Lowery
- Jake Luton
- Chris Luzar
- Aaron Lynch

== M ==
- Greg Mabin
- Stacey Mack
- Malaefou MacKenzie
- Anthony Maddox
- Chris Manhertz
- Vince Manuwai
- Sen'Derrick Marks
- Seth Marler
- Cassius Marsh
- Curtis Marsh Sr.
- Brandon Marshall
- Nick Marshall
- Jamie Martin
- Sherrod Martin
- Lonnie Marts
- Eddie Mason
- Robert Massey
- Le'Shai Maston
- Rashean Mathis
- Ross Matiscik
- John Matthews
- Steve Matthews
- Corey Mayfield
- Darcel McBath
- Trumaine McBride
- Max McCaffrey
- Keenan McCardell
- Jimmy McClain
- Jacques McClendon
- Luke McCown
- Bobby McCray
- Demetrius McCray
- Lerentee McCray
- Marlon McCree
- Tony McDaniel
- K. C. McDermott
- Bradley McDougald
- Stockar McDougle
- Blaine McElmurry
- Chase McLaughlin
- Brandon McManus
- Tom McManus
- Jeremy McNichols
- Natrone Means
- Quenton Meeks
- Brad Meester
- Rob Meier
- Patrick Mekari
- Jakobi Meyers
- Jaydon Mickens
- Doug Middleton
- William Middleton
- Bronzell Miller
- Bruce Miller
- Craig Miller
- John Miller
- Jordan Miller
- Roy Miller
- Ventrell Miller
- Zach Miller
- Javor Mills
- Wyatt Milum
- Jeremy Mincey
- Gardner Minshew
- Anthony Mitchell
- Keith Mitchell
- Pete Mitchell
- Antwaun Molden
- Donte Moncrief
- Jonah Monheim
- Eugene Monroe
- Will Moore
- Frank Moreau
- Aaron Morgan
- Quintin Morris
- Kirk Morrison
- Mitch Morse
- C. J. Mosley
- Nick Mullens
- Chad Muma
- Johnny Mundt
- Richard Murphy
- Eric Murray
- Tanner Muse
- Jason Myers
- Jalen Myrick
- Tom Myslinski

== N ==
- Chris Naeole
- Jeremy Navarre
- Reggie Nelson (born 1976)
- Reggie Nelson (born 1983)
- Jamar Nesbit
- Ryan Neufeld
- Quentin Neujahr
- Drake Nevis
- Greg Newsome II
- Jamar Newsome
- Yannick Ngakoue
- Hardy Nickerson
- Parry Nickerson
- Chad Nkang
- Danny Noble
- Dennis Norman
- Slade Norris
- Dennis Northcutt
- Brad Nortman
- Andrew Norwell
- Jeff Novak
- Drew Nowak
- Josh Nurse
- Uche Nwaneri

== O ==
- Jared Odrick
- Emmanuel Ogbah
- Cedric Ogbuehi
- Dare Ogunbowale
- Nick O'Leary
- Josh Oliver
- Erik Olson
- Foyesade Oluokun
- Patrick Omameh
- Fendi Onobun
- Shantee Orr
- Amani Oruwariye
- Matthew Orzech
- Kassim Osgood
- James O'Shaughnessy
- Esezi Otomewo
- Matt Overton
- Chad Owens
- Montell Owens
- Akwasi Owusu-Ansah
- Devine Ozigbo

== P ==
- Tobais Palmer
- Chris Parker
- Ricky Parker
- Jalen Parmele
- Jermey Parnell
- Tony Pashos
- Austin Pasztor
- Tyler Patmon
- Tim Patrick
- Elton Patterson
- Riley Patterson
- Niles Paul
- Bryce Paup
- Donald Payne
- Seth Payne
- Alvin Pearman
- Mike Pearson
- Josh Pederson
- Troy Pelshak
- Jeris Pendleton
- Ray Perryman
- Corey Peters
- Greg Peterson
- Mike Peterson
- Will Peterson
- Kenneth Pettway
- Carroll Phillips
- Bernard Pierce
- Larry Pinkard
- Anthony Pittman
- Lafayette Pitts
- Adam Podlesh
- Jerry Porter
- Sean Porter
- Jeff Posey
- Paul Posluszny
- Zach Potter
- Jeremiah Poutasi
- Taylor Price
- Deantre Prince
- Ryan Prince
- Pierson Prioleau
- Kelvin Pritchett
- Chris Prosinski
- Calvin Pryor
- Hayes Pullard

== Q ==
- Shaq Quarterman
- Jonathan Quinn
- Trey Quinn

== R ==
- Will Rackley
- Wali Rainer
- Jalen Ramsey
- Derrick Ransom
- C. J. Reavis
- Jimmy Redmond
- Chris Reed
- Caraun Reid
- Allen Reisner
- Tutan Reyes
- Craig Reynolds
- Josh Reynolds
- LaRoy Reynolds
- David Richardson
- Will Richardson
- David Richie
- Calvin Ridley
- Andre Rison
- Chris Roberson
- James Roberson
- Roy Robertson-Harris
- Allen Robinson
- Cam Robinson
- Corey Robinson
- Denard Robinson
- Eddie Robinson Jr.
- James Robinson
- Josh Robinson
- Keilan Robinson
- Laurent Robinson
- Aldrick Rosas
- Aaron Ross
- Daniel Ross
- Micah Ross
- Matt Roth
- Mark Royals
- Martin Rucker
- Marcus Rush
- Brandon Rusnak
- Brian Russell
- Chapelle Russell
- Dontavius Russell
- Kevin Rutland
- Jake Ryan

== S ==
- Troy Sadowski
- Ephraim Salaam
- James Sample
- Ace Sanders
- Mekhi Sargent
- Eric Saubert
- Khalen Saunders
- Darnell Savage
- Brandon Scherff
- Joe Schobert
- Bryan Schwartz
- Josh Scobee
- J. K. Scott
- Josiah Scott
- Leon Searcy
- Tim Seder
- Austin Seferian-Jenkins
- George Selvie
- Gerald Sensabaugh
- Clint Session
- Tawambi Settles
- Adam Seward
- Tyler Shatley
- Bobby Shaw
- Tim Shaw
- Jabaal Sheard
- Daimon Shelton
- Laviska Shenault
- Gannon Shepherd
- Ashley Sheppard
- Jordan Shipley
- Cecil Shorts
- Mickey Shuler Jr.
- Cam'Ron Silmon-Craig
- Clyde Simmons
- Mike Sims-Walker
- Dan Skuta
- T. J. Slaughter
- Joel Smeenge
- Justin Smiley
- Anthony Smith
- Bryan Smith
- Chris Smith
- D'Anthony Smith
- Daryl Smith)
- Devin Smith
- Emanuel Smith
- Fernando Smith
- Jeff Smith
- Jimmy Smith
- Jordan Smith
- Larry Smith
- Maason Smith
- Malcolm Smith
- Steve Smith
- Telvin Smith
- Isaac Smolko
- Dawuane Smoot
- Nick Sorensen
- R. Jay Soward
- Stephen Spach
- Martrell Spaight
- Akeem Spence
- Paul Spicer
- Jason Spitz
- Micheal Spurlock
- Brenden Stai
- Isaiah Stanback
- Julian Stanford
- Montavious Stanley
- Scott Starks
- Santo Stephens
- Neal Sterling
- James Stewart
- Rayna Stewart
- Shyrone Stith
- J. J. Stokes
- Erik Storz
- Maurice Stovall
- Brenton Strange
- Tommy Streeter
- Danny Striggow
- Jaelen Strong
- Marcus Stroud
- Darren Studstill
- Nate Stupar
- Ty Summers
- Geoff Swaim
- Michael Swift

== T ==
- Jim Tarle
- Will Taʻufoʻou
- Cordell Taylor
- Fred Taylor
- Herb Taylor
- Jawaan Taylor
- Keith Taylor
- Kerry Taylor
- Shannon Taylor
- Daryl Terrell
- Corey Terry
- Brian Thomas
- Daniel Thomas
- Dave Thomas
- Edward Thomas
- J. T. Thomas
- Julius Thomas
- Kiwaukee Thomas
- Lamaar Thomas
- Mike Thomas
- Pat Thomas
- Tra Thomas
- Chris Thompson
- Lamont Thompson
- Mike Thompson
- Peyton Thompson
- Juan Thornhill
- Jabbar Threats
- Cedric Tillman
- Carson Tinker
- Jordan Todman
- LaBrandon Toefield
- Keith Toston
- Austin Trammell
- Badara Traore
- James Trapp
- Laquon Treadwell
- Morgan Trent
- Jordan Tripp
- Esera Tuaolo
- Jay Tufele
- Joe Tuipala
- Matt Turk
- Bhayshul Tuten
- Rich Tylski

== U ==
- Tiquan Underwood
- Regan Upshaw

== V ==
- Steve Vallos
- Cole Van Lanen

== W ==
- John Wade
- Gary Walker
- Josh Walker
- Michael Walker
- Travon Walker
- Tre'Vour Wallace-Simms
- Bryan Walters
- Jihad Ward
- Kahale Warring
- Chauncey Washington
- Dewayne Washington
- Mickey Washington
- Parker Washington
- Patrick Washington
- Tony Washington
- Dekoda Watson
- Steve Weatherford
- Dee Webb
- Josh Wells
- Joe Wesley
- Chastin West
- Dede Westbrook
- Eric Westmoreland
- Terrence Wheatley
- Damen Wheeler
- Guy Whimper
- Jose White
- Reggie White
- Tracy White
- Bob Whitfield
- Alvis Whitted
- Dave Widell
- Zach Wiegert
- Brandon Wilds
- Marcellus Wiley
- Ernest Wilford
- Bruce Wilkerson
- Brian Williams
- Darious Williams
- Darryl Williams
- David Williams
- D. J. Williams
- James Williams
- Jermaine Williams
- Julius Williams
- Lamanzer Williams
- Mark Williams
- Maurice Williams
- Quincy Williams
- Reggie Williams
- Stephen Williams
- Teddy Williams
- Thomas Williams
- Troy Williamson
- Damien Wilson
- Jarrod Wilson
- Derrick Wimbush
- Jamie Winborn
- Andrew Wingard
- Stefen Wisniewski
- Brian Witherspoon
- D'Juan Woods
- George Wrighster
- Brandon Wright
- Kenny Wright
- Matthew Wright
- James Wyche
- Renaldo Wynn
- Shane Wynn

== Y ==
- T. J. Yeldon
- Todd Yoder
- Ashton Youboty
- Sam Young

== Z ==
- Steve Zahursky
- Joe Zelenka
