= 2000 Jacksonville Jaguars season =

6th season in franchise history

- Owner: Wayne Weaver
- Head coach: Tom Coughlin
- Defensive coordinator: Dom Capers
- Home stadium: Alltel Stadium

Results
- Record: 7–9
- Division place: 4th AFC Central
- Playoffs: Did not qualify
- Pro Bowlers: WR Jimmy Smith

Uniform

The 2000 season was the Jacksonville Jaguars' 6th in the National Football League and their sixth under head coach Tom Coughlin.

The Jaguars in 1999 had obtained an NFL-best record of 14–2 and thrashed the Miami Dolphins in their divisional-round game. However, they were helped by an extremely easy regular-season schedule. In 2000, the Jaguars were severely hit by the loss of safety Carnell Lake for the entire season to foot surgery, and by an ultimately career-ending knee injury to right tackle Leon Searcy. Further offensive line injuries, notably to left tackle Zach Wiegert and center John Wade, crippled the Jaguars all season, with the result that after a fair start the Jaguars fell in Week 4 to five consecutive losses and were out of the running for a postseason berth by December, and thus knocking them out of the playoffs for the first time since 1995 when the franchise was first established. Ultimately the team's tally of wins was halved from 1999. At the close of the season, the Jaguars also had problems with being $31 million over the salary cap.

== Offseason ==
Additions	Subtractions
LB Hardy Nickerson (Buccaneers)	LB Bryce Paup (Vikings)
G Brenden Stai (Steelers)	RB James Stewart (Lions)
C Jeff Smith (Chiefs)	G Ben Coleman (Chargers)
	G Rich Tylski (Steelers)
	QB Jay Fiedler (Dolphins)
	CB Dave Thomas (Giants)

=== NFL draft ===
2000 Jacksonville Jaguars draft
Round	Pick	Player	Position	College	Notes
1	29	R. Jay Soward	Wide receiver	USC	
2	60	Brad Meester	Center	Northern Iowa	
3	92	T.J. Slaughter	Linebacker	Southern Mississippi	
4	123	Joey Chustz	Offensive tackle	Louisiana Tech	
5	159	Kiwaukee Thomas	Cornerback	Georgia Southern	
6	196	Emanuel Smith	Wide receiver	Arkansas	
7	236	Erik Olson	Safety	Colorado State	
7	241 (Note: This was a compensatory draft selection.)	Rob Meier	Defensive tackle	Washington State	
7	243	Shyrone Stith	Running back	Virginia Tech	
7	245	Danny Clark	Linebacker	Illinois	
7	247	Mark Baniewicz	Tackle	Syracuse	
Made roster

=== Undrafted free agents ===
2000 undrafted free agents of note
Player	Position	College
Brandon Christenson	Tight end	Northwest Oklahoma State
John Feugill	Tackle	Maryland
Isaac Harvin	Cornerback	Northwest Oklahoma State
Ryan Reilly	Defensive Tackle	Arizona State
Eric Thomas	Center	Florida State
Ethan Weidle	Guard	Pittsburgh
Kenneth Williams	Fullback	Florida A&M

== Staff ==
2000 Jacksonville Jaguars staff
Front office: Chairman/chief executive officer – Wayne Weaver; Senior vice president of football operations – Michael Huyghue; Director of player personnel – Rick Reiprish; Director of college scouting – Gene Smith; Director of pro scouting – Fran Foley; College scout – Louis Clark; Head coaches: Head coach – Tom Coughlin; Offensive coaches: Quarterbacks – Bobby Petrino; Running backs – Jerald Ingram; Wide receivers – John McNulty; Tight ends – Fred Hoaglin; Offensive line – Mike Maser; Offensive quality control – Garrick McGee	Defensive coaches: Defensive coordinator – Dom Capers; Defensive line – John Pease; Linebackers – Steve Szabo; Outside linebackers – Lucious Selmon; Defensive backs – Perry Fewell; Defensive quality control – Lane Kiffin; Special teams coaches: Special teams coordinator – Frank Gansz; Assistant special teams/administrative assistant to the head coach – John Bonamego; Strength and conditioning: Strength and conditioning – Jerry Palmieri; Assistant strength and conditioning – Greg Finnegan

== Final roster ==
2000 Jacksonville Jaguars roster
Quarterbacks (QB): 8 Mark Brunell; 10 Jamie Martin; 12 Jonathan Quinn; Running backs (RB): 23 Anthony Johnson; 31 Daimon Shelton FB; 33 Shyrone Stith KR; 28 Fred Taylor; 43 Jermaine Williams; Wide receivers (WR): 84 Reggie Barlow; 87 Keenan McCardell; 89 Emanuel Smith; 82 Jimmy Smith; 86 Alvis Whitted; Tight ends (TE): 80 Kyle Brady; 85 Rich Griffith LS; 83 Ryan Neufeld	Offensive linemen (OL): 71 Tony Boselli T; 78 Todd Fordham T; 64 Aaron Koch G; 76 Dwayne Ledford C; 63 Brad Meester G; 79 Reggie Nelson T; 65 Quentin Neujahr C; 67 Gannon Shepherd T; 73 Jeff Smith C; 68 Brendan Stai G; Defensive linemen (DL): 90 Tony Brackens DE; 93 Emarlos Leroy DT; 92 Rob Meier DE; 91 Seth Payne DT; 99 Joel Smeenge DE; 94 Larry Smith DT; 95 Paul Spicer DE; 96 Gary Walker DT; 97 Renaldo Wynn DE	Linebackers (LB): 52 Brant Boyer MLB; 55 Danny Clark OLB; 51 Kevin Hardy OLB; 54 Troy Pelshak OLB; 53 T. J. Slaughter MLB; 59 Edward Thomas OLB; Defensive backs (DB): 21 Aaron Beasley CB; 25 Fernando Bryant CB; 29 Jason Craft CB; 27 Shadwick Criss CB; 20 Donovin Darius SS; 32 Mike Logan FS; 45 Erik Olson SS; 26 Rayna Stewart FS; 41 Kiwaukee Thomas CB; Special teams (ST): 4 Bryan Barker P; 1 Mike Hollis K; 5 Jim Tarle K	Practice squad: 42 Jason Brookins RB; 98 Jomo Cousins DE; 19 Mike Horacek WR; 70 Jeff Marriott DT; 24 Craig Miller CB; Reserve: 69 Mike Baniewicz T (IR); 78 Joey Chustz T (IR); 88 Damon Jones TE (IR); 37 Carnell Lake S (IR); 34 Stacey Mack RB (IR); 58 Lonnie Marts LB (IR); 56 Hardy Nickerson LB (IR); 72 Leon Searcy T (IR); 81 R. Jay Soward (NF-Ill.); 50 Erik Storz LB (IR); 66 John Wade C (IR); 77 Zach Wiegert T (IR); Rookies in italics 53 active, 11 reserve, 5 practice squad

== Preseason ==
Week	Date	Opponent	Result	Record	Venue
1	August 4	at Carolina Panthers	W 34–14	1–0	Ericsson Stadium
2	August 11	New York Giants	W 16–13	2–0	Alltel Stadium
3	August 19	at Kansas City Chiefs	W 26–22	3–0	Arrowhead Stadium
4	August 24	Atlanta Falcons	L 20–31	3–1	Alltel Stadium

== Regular season ==
=== Schedule ===
Week	Date	Opponent	Result	Record	Venue	Attendance
1	September 3	at **Cleveland Browns**	**W** 27–7	1–0	Cleveland Browns Stadium	72,418
2	September 10	at **Baltimore Ravens**	**L** 36–39	1–1	PSINet Stadium	68,843
3	September 17	**Cincinnati Bengals**	**W** 13–0	2–1	Alltel Stadium	45,653
4	September 25	at Indianapolis Colts	**L** 14–43	2–2	RCA Dome	56,816
5	October 1	**Pittsburgh Steelers**	**L** 13–24	2–3	Alltel Stadium	64,351
6	October 8	**Baltimore Ravens**	**L** 10–15	2–4	Alltel Stadium	65,194
7	October 16	at **Tennessee Titans**	**L** 13–27	2–5	Adelphia Coliseum	68,498
8	October 22	Washington Redskins	**L** 16–35	2–6	Alltel Stadium	69,061
9	October 29	at Dallas Cowboys	**W** 23–17 (OT)	3–6	Texas Stadium	63,554
10	Bye					
11	November 12	Seattle Seahawks	**L** 21–28	3–7	Alltel Stadium	68,063
12	November 19	at **Pittsburgh Steelers**	**W** 34–24	4–7	Three Rivers Stadium	50,925
13	November 26	**Tennessee Titans**	**W** 16–13	5–7	Alltel Stadium	65,454
14	December 3	**Cleveland Browns**	**W** 48–0	6–7	Alltel Stadium	51,262
15	December 10	Arizona Cardinals	**W** 44–10	7–7	Alltel Stadium	53,472
16	December 17	at **Cincinnati Bengals**	**L** 14–17	7–8	Paul Brown Stadium	50,469
17	December 23	at New York Giants	**L** 25–28	7–9	Giants Stadium	77,924

Note: Intra-division opponents are in bold text.

=== Game summaries ===
==== Week 1: at Cleveland Browns ====
Week One: Jacksonville Jaguars at Cleveland Browns – Game summary

Quarter	1	2	3	4	Total
**Jaguars**	0	10	10	7	**27**
Browns	0	7	0	0	**7**

at Cleveland Browns Stadium, Cleveland, Ohio

- Date: September 3, 2000
- Game time: 1:00 p.m. EST
- Game weather: Sunny, 78 °F (26 °C)
- Game attendance: 72,418
- Referee: Bernie Kukar
- TV announcers (CBS): Ian Eagle and Mark May
- Recap, Game Book

Game information

**First quarter**

- No scoring plays.

**Second quarter**

- JAX – Jimmy Smith 2-yard pass from Mark Brunell (Mike Hollis kick), 11:44. Jaguars 7–0. **Drive: 15 plays, 97 yards, 7:53.**
- CLE – JaJuan Dawson 13-yard pass from Tim Couch (Phil Dawson kick), 3:27. Tied 7–7. **Drive: 8 plays, 67 yards, 4:08.**
- JAX – Mike Hollis 50-yard field goal, 0:30. Jaguars 10–7. **Drive: 12 plays, 40 yards, 2:57.**

**Third quarter**

- JAX – Stacey Mack 3-yard run (Mike Hollis kick), 7:39. Jaguars 17–7. **Drive: 9 plays, 86 yards, 4:10.**
- JAX – Mike Hollis 25-yard field goal, 1:20. Jaguars 20–7. **Drive: 10 plays, 54 yards, 4:33.**

**Fourth quarter**

- JAX – Chris Howard 9-yard run (Mike Hollis kick), 4:28. Jaguars 27–7. **Drive: 17 plays, 68 yards, 10:18.**

Top passers

- JAX – Mark Brunell – 24/34, 301 yards, TD
- CLE – Tim Couch – 19/27, 160 yards, TD

Top rushers

- JAX – Stacey Mack – 23 rushes, 74 yards, TD
- CLE – Errict Rhett – 14 rushes, 64 yards

Top receivers

- JAX – Keenan McCardell – 9 receptions, 115 yards
- CLE – JaJuan Dawson – 6 receptions, 83 yards, TD

==== Week 2: at Baltimore Ravens ====
Week Two: Jacksonville Jaguars at Baltimore Ravens – Game summary

Quarter	1	2	3	4	Total
Jaguars	17	6	3	10	**36**
**Ravens**	0	7	15	17	**39**

at PSINet Stadium, Baltimore, Maryland

- Date: September 10, 2000
- Game time: 1:00 p.m. EST
- Game weather: Mostly sunny, 82 °F (28 °C)
- Game attendance: 63,843
- Referee: Johnny Grier
- TV announcers (CBS): Verne Lundquist, Dan Dierdorf, and Bonnie Bernstein
- Recap, Game Book

Game information

**First quarter**

- JAX – Mike Hollis 36-yard field goal, 11:15. Jaguars 3–0. **Drive: 7 plays, 48 yards, 3:45.**
- JAX – Jimmy Smith 45-yard pass from Mark Brunell (Mike Hollis kick), 7:49. Jaguars 10–0. **Drive: 4 plays, 43 yards, 1:32.**
- JAX – Jimmy Smith 43-yard pass from Mark Brunell (Mike Hollis kick), 2:32. Jaguars 17–0. **Drive: 5 plays, 77 yards, 2:473.**

**Second quarter**

- BAL – Travis Taylor 14-yard pass from Tony Banks (Matt Stover kick), 14:48. Jaguars 17–7. **Drive: 1 play, 14 yards, 0:06.**
- JAX – Mike Hollis 45-yard field goal, 3:36. Jaguars 20–7. **Drive: 14 plays, 63 yards, 6:40.**
- JAX – Mike Hollis 48-yard field goal, 0:44. Jaguars 23–7. **Drive: 8 plays, 28 yards, 0:58.**

**Third quarter**

- BAL – Travis Taylor 23-yard pass from Tony Banks (Ben Coates pass from Tony Banks), 13:31. Jaguars 23–15. **Drive: 4 plays, 68 yards, 1:29.**
- JAX – Mike Hollis 34-yard field goal, 6:47. Jaguars 26–15, **Drive: 9 plays, 25 yards, 4:54.**
- BAL – Obafemi Ayanbadejo 5-yard pass from Tony Banks (Matt Stover kick), 1:02. Jaguars 26–22. **Drive: 10 plays, 76 yards, 5:45.**

**Fourth quarter**

- BAL – Jermaine Lewis 12-yard pass from Tony Banks (Matt Stover kick), 10:00. Ravens 29–26. **Drive: 2 plays, 12 yards, 0:57.**
- BAL – Matt Stover 44-yard field goal, 7:00. Ravens 32–26. **Drive: 4 plays, 9 yards, 1:28.**
- JAX – Mike Hollis 48-yard field goal, 3:53. Ravens 32–29. **Drive: 9 plays, 51 yards, 3:07.**
- JAX – Jimmy Smith 40-yard pass from Mark Brunell (Mike Hollis kick), 1:45. Jaguars 36–32. **Drive: 4 plays, 61 yards, 0:57.**
- BAL – Shannon Sharpe 29-yard pass from Tony Banks (Matt Stover kick), 0:41. Ravens 39–36. **Drive: 7 plays, 75 yards, 1:04.**

**Top passers**

- JAX – Mark Brunell – 28/50, 386 yards, 3 TD, 2 INT
- BAL – Tony Banks – 23/40, 262 yards, 5 TD, 2 INT

**Top rushers**

- JAX – Stacey Mack – 11 rushes, 36 yards
- BAL – Priest Holmes – 10 rushes, 54 yards

**Top receivers**

- JAX – Jimmy Smith – 15 receptions, 291 yards, 3 TD
- BAL – Travis Taylor – 4 receptions, 80 yards, 2 TD

==== Week 3: vs. Cincinnati Bengals ====
Week Three: Cincinnati Bengals at Jacksonville Jaguars – Game summary

Quarter	1	2	3	4	Total
Bengals	0	0	0	0	**0**
**Jaguars**	10	0	0	3	**13**

at Alltel Stadium, Jacksonville, Florida

- Date: September 17, 2000
- Game time: 1:00 p.m. EDT
- Game weather: Rain, 71 °F (22 °C)
- Game attendance: 70,532
- Referee: Ed Hochuli
- TV announcers (CBS): Kevin Harlan, Randy Cross, and Beasley Reece
- Recap, Game Book

Game information

**First quarter**

- No scoring plays.

**Second quarter**

- JAX – Keenan McCardell 21-yard pass from Mark Brunell (Steve Lindsey kick), 7:14. Jaguars 7–0. **Drive: 6 plays, 54 yards, 3:59.**
- JAX – Steve Lindsey 30-yard field goal, 5:37. Jaguars 10–0. **Drive: 4 plays, 5 yards, 1:26.**

**Third quarter**

- No scoring plays.

**Fourth quarter**

- JAX – Steve Lindsey 19-yard field goal, 1:45. Jaguars 13–0. **Drive: 5 plays, 14 yards, 1:28.**

Top passers

- CIN – Akili Smith – 18/41, 183 yards, 2 INT
- JAX – Mark Brunell – 20/32, 176 yards, TD, INT

Top rushers

- CIN – Akili Smith – 5 rushes, 34 yards
- JAX – Stacey Mack – 20 rushes, 35 yards

Top receivers

- CIN – Peter Warrick – 5 receptions, 75 yards
- JAX – Keenan McCardell – 10 receptions, 108 yards, TD

==== Week 4: at Indianapolis Colts ====
Week Four: Jacksonville Jaguars at Indianapolis Colts – Game summary

Quarter	1	2	3	4	Total
Jaguars	0	14	0	0	**14**
**Colts**	7	14	5	17	**43**

at RCA Dome, Indianapolis, Indiana

- Date: September 25, 2000
- Game time: 9:00 p.m. EDT
- Game weather: None (indoor stadium)
- Game attendance: 56,816
- Referee: Mike Carey
- TV announcers (ABC): Al Michaels, Dan Fouts, Dennis Miller, Melissa Stark, and Eric Dickerson
- Recap, Game Book

Game information

**First quarter**

- IND – Marvin Harrison 76-yard pass from Peyton Manning (Mike Vanderjagt kick), 10:59. Colts 7–0. **Drive: 3 plays, 89 yards, 1:31.**

**Second quarter**

- JAX – Jimmy Smith 9-yard pass from Mark Brunell (Steve Lindsey kick), 7:36. Tied 7—7. **Drive: 4 plays, 44 yards, 1:10.**
- IND – Terrence Wilkins 27-yard pass from Peyton Manning (Mike Vanderjagt kick), 5:09. Colts 14–7. **Drive: 3 plays, 26 yards, 0:53.**
- IND – Jerome Pathon 16-yard pass from Peyton Manning (Mike Vanderjagt kick), 1:28. Colts 21–7. **Drive: 4 plays, 72 yards, 1:13.**
- JAX – Jimmy Smith 26-yard pass from Mark Brunell (Steve Lindsey kick), 0:11. Colts 21–14. **Drive: 7 plays, 75 yards, 1:17.**

**Third quarter**

- IND – Mike Vanderjagt 41-yard field goal, 5:32. Colts 24–14. **Drive: 10 plays, 67 yards, 5:58.**
- IND – Mark Brunell sacked by Chad Bratzke in end zone for safety, 1:10. Colts 26–14.

**Fourth quarter**

- IND – Mike Vanderjagt 22-yard field goal, 11:31. Colts 29–14. **Drive: 10 plays, 58 yards, 4:39.**
- IND – Ken Dilger 4-yard pass from Peyton Manning (Mike Vanderjagt kick), 8:42. Colts 36–14. **Drive: 5 plays, 62 yards, 2:16.**
- IND – Edgerrin James 14-yard rush (Mike Vanderjagt kick), 5:55. Colts 43–14. **Drive: 3 plays, 43 yards, 1:29.**

**Top passers**

- JAX – Mark Brunell, 21/36, 229 yards, 2 TD, 2 INT
- IND – Peyton Manning, 23/36, 440 yards, 4 TD

**Top rushers**

- JAX – Fred Taylor, 14 rushes, 57 yards
- IND – Edgerrin James, 22 rushes, 89 yards, TD

**Top receivers**

- JAX – Jimmy Smith, 9 receptions, 132 yards, 2 TD
- IND – Terrence Wilkins, 9 receptions, 148 yards, TD

==== Week 5: vs. Pittsburgh Steelers ====
Week Five: Pittsburgh Steelers at Jacksonville Jaguars – Game summary

Quarter	1	2	3	4	Total
**Steelers**	7	10	7	0	**24**
Jaguars	3	3	0	7	**13**

at Alltel Stadium, Jacksonville, Florida

- Date: October 1, 2000
- Game time: 1:00 p.m. EDT
- Game weather: 76 °F (24 °C)
- Game attendance: 64,351
- Referee: Jeff Triplette
- TV announcers (CBS): Kevin Harlan, Randy Cross, and Beasley Reece
- Recap, Game Book

Game information

**First quarter**

- JAX – Steve Lindsey 19-yard field goal, 9:57. Jaguars 3–0. **Drive: 4 plays, 3 yards, 1:28.**
- PIT – Chris Fuamatu-Ma'afala 5-yard run (Kris Brown kick), 0:41. Steelers 7–3. **Drive: 10 plays, 53 yards, 5:29.**

**Second quarter**

- PIT – Kris Brown 19-yard field goal, 6:52. Steelers 10–3. **Drive: 10 plays, 79 yards, 4:59.**
- PIT – Jerome Bettis 1-yard run (Kris Brown kick), 3:13. Steelers 17–3. **Drive: 6 plays, 24 yards, 3:22.**
- JAX – Steve Lindsey 48-yard field goal, 0:31. Steelers 17–6. **Drive: 13 plays, 38 yards, 2:42.**

**Third quarter**

- PIT – Jerome Bettis 3-yard run (Kris Brown kick), 4:27. Steelers 24–6. **Drive: 7 plays, 60 yards, 3:58.**

**Fourth quarter**

- JAX – Keenan McCardell 11-yard pass from Jamie Martin (Steve Lindsey kick), 0:09. Steelers 24–13. **Drive: 15 plays, 90 yards, 3:30.**

Top passers

- PIT – Kordell Stewart – 10/16, 132 yards, INT
- JAX – Mark Brunell – 15/32, 137 yards, INT

Top rushers

- PIT – Jerome Bettis – 28 rushes, 97 yards, 2 TD
- JAX – Fred Taylor – 15 rushes, 24 yards

Top receivers

- PIT – Plaxico Burress – 3 receptions, 40 yards
- JAX – Keenan McCardell – 11 receptions, 137 yards, TD

==== Week 6: vs. Baltimore Ravens ====
Week Six: Baltimore Ravens at Jacksonville Jaguars – Game summary

Quarter	1	2	3	4	Total
**Ravens**	3	3	3	6	**15**
Jaguars	3	0	0	7	**10**

at Alltel Stadium, Jacksonville, Florida

- Date: October 8, 2000
- Game time: 8:20 p.m. EST
- Game weather: 62 °F (17 °C)
- Game attendance: 65,194
- Referee: Ron Winter
- TV announcers (ESPN): Mike Patrick, Joe Theismann, Paul Maguire, and Suzy Kolber
- Recap, Game Book

Game information

**First quarter**

- JAX – Steve Lindsey 49-yard field goal, 8:04. Jaguars 3–0. **Drive: 4 plays, 2 yards, 0:56.**
- BAL – Matt Stover 47-yard field goal, 1:23. Tied 3–3. **Drive: 6 plays, 34 yards, 2:24.**

**Second quarter**

- BAL – Matt Stover 32-yard field goal, 0:21. Ravens 6–3. **Drive: 5 plays, 19 yards, 0:41.**

**Third quarter**

- BAL – Matt Stover 43-yard field goal, 12:37. Ravens 9–3. **Drive: 4 plays, -1 yards, 1:35.**

**Fourth quarter**

- BAL – Matt Stover 21-yard field goal, 13:38. Ravens 12–3. **Drive: 16 plays, 65 yards, 7:24.**
- BAL – Matt Stover 23-yard field goal, 9:44. Ravens 15–3. **Drive: 4 plays, -4 yards, 1:11.**
- JAX – Fred Taylor 1-yard run (Steve Lindsey kick), 4:04. Ravens 15–10. **Drive: 12 plays, 75 yards, 5:40.**

**Top passers**

- BAL – Tony Banks – 17/39, 154 yards
- JAX – Mark Brunell – 18/28, 167 yards, 2 INT

**Top rushers**

- BAL – Jamal Lewis – 17 rushes, 44 yards
- JAX – Fred Taylor – 17 rushes, 54 yards, TD

**Top receivers**

- BAL – Qadry Ismail – 9 receptions, 85 yards
- JAX – Jimmy Smith – 8 receptions, 95 yards

==== Week 7: at Tennessee Titans ====
Week Seven: Jacksonville Jaguars at Tennessee Titans – Game summary

Quarter	1	2	3	4	Total
Jaguars	3	0	0	10	**13**
**Titans**	7	10	7	3	**27**

at Adelphia Coliseum, Nashville, Tennessee

- Date: October 16, 2000
- Game time: 10:00 p.m. EST
- Game weather: Overcast, 74 °F (23 °C)
- Game attendance: 68,498
- Referee: Bernie Kukar
- TV announcers (ABC): Al Michaels, Dan Fouts, Dennis Miller, Melissa Stark, and Eric Dickerson
- Recap, Game Book

Game information

**First quarter**

- JAX – Mike Hollis 23-yard field goal, 7:37. Jaguars 3–0. **Drive: 5 plays, 77 yards, 3:07.**
- TEN – Frank Wycheck 4-yard pass from Steve McNair (Al Del Greco kick), 4:11. Titans 7–3. **Drive: 6 plays, 34 yards, 3:26.**

**Second quarter**

- TEN – Derrick Mason 22-yard pass from Steve McNair (Al Del Greco kick), 12:41. Titans 14–3. **Drive: 9 plays, 81 yards, 4:07.**
- TEN – Al Del Greco 26-yard field goal, 6:44. Titans 17–3. **Drive: 6 plays, 35 yards, 3:52.**

**Third quarter**

- TEN – Eddie George 19-yard run (Al Del Greco kick), 8:48. Titans 24–3. **Drive: 6 plays, 89 yards, 3:39.**

**Fourth quarter**

- JAX – Mike Hollis 45-yard field goal, 13:19. Titans 24–6. **Drive: 12 plays, 38 yards, 5:21.**
- TEN – Al Del Greco 28-yard field goal, 6:44. Titans 27–6. **Drive: 12 plays, 72 yards, 6:28.**
- JAX – Anthony Johnson 2-yard run (Mike Hollis kick), 0:53. Titans 27–13. **Drive: 9 plays, 55 yards, 2:44.**

Top passers

- JAX – Mark Brunell – 18/27, 196 yards
- TEN – Steve McNair – 13/21, 234 yards, 2 TD

Top rushers

- JAX – Fred Taylor – 20 rushes, 112 yards
- TEN – Eddie George – 29 rushes, 167 yards, TD

Top receivers

- JAX – Keenan McCardell – 5 receptions, 64 yards
- TEN – Yancy Thigpen – 2 receptions, 54 yards

==== Week 8: vs. Washington Redskins ====
Week Eight: Washington Redskins at Jacksonville Jaguars – Game summary

Quarter	1	2	3	4	Total
**Redskins**	7	14	7	7	**35**
Jaguars	3	13	0	0	**16**

at Alltel Stadium, Jacksonville, Florida

- Date: October 22, 2000
- Game time: 4:15 p.m. EST
- Game weather: 79 °F (26 °C)
- Game attendance: 69,061
- Referee: Bob McElwee
- TV announcers (FOX): Pat Summerall, John Madden, and D. J. Johnson
- Recap, Game Book

Game information

**First quarter**

- WSH – Stephen Davis 1-yard run (Kris Heppner kick), 9:40. Redskins 7–0. **Drive: 5 plays, 38 yards, 2:27.**
- JAX – Mike Hollis 23-yard field goal, 3:22. Redskins 7–3. **Drive: 16 plays, 86 yards, 6:18.**

**Second quarter**

- JAX – R. Jay Soward 33-yard pass from Mark Brunell (Mike Hollis kick), 12:14. Jaguars 10–7. **Drive: 9 plays, 80 yards, 3:57.**
- WSH – Albert Connell 11-yard pass from Brad Johnson (Kris Heppner kick), 9:53. Redskins 14–10. **Drive: 2 plays, 12 yards, 0:48.**
- WSH – Albert Connell 49-yard pass from Brad Johnson (Kris Heppner kick), 5:39. Redskins 21–10. **Drive: 2 plays, 51 yards, 0:44.**
- JAX – Mike Hollis 33-yard field goal, 2:15. Redskins 21–13. **Drive: 8 plays, 51 yards, 3:24.**
- JAX – Mike Hollis 51-yard field goal, 0:31. Redskins 21–16. **Drive: 7 plays, 23 yards, 1:19.**

**Third quarter**

- WSH – Albert Connell 77-yard pass from Brad Johnson (Kris Heppner kick), 10:22. Redskins 28–16. **Drive: 1 play, 77 yards, 0:12.**

**Fourth quarter**

- WSH – Stephen Davis 16-yard run (Kris Heppner kick), 4:32. Redskins 35–16. **Drive: 9 plays, 45 yards, 5:08.**

**Top passers**

- WSH – Brad Johnson – 16/24, 269 yards, 3 TD, INT
- JAX – Mark Brunell – 21/42, 271 yards, TD, 2 INT

**Top rushers**

- WSH – Stephen Davis – 24 rushes, 114 yards, 2 TD
- JAX – Fred Taylor – 22 rushes, 124 yards

**Top receivers**

- WSH – Albert Connell – 7 receptions, 21 yards, 3 TD
- JAX – Kyle Brady – 8 receptions, 111 yards

==== Week 9: at Dallas Cowboys ====
Week Nine: Jacksonville Jaguars at Dallas Cowboys – Game summary

Quarter	1	2	3	4	OT	Total
**Jaguars**	0	17	0	0	6	**23**
Cowboys	7	0	3	7	0	**17**

at Texas Stadium, Irving, Texas

- Date: October 29, 2000
- Game time: 4:15 p.m. EST
- Game attendance: 63,554
- Referee: Bill Carollo
- TV announcers (CBS): Greg Gumbel, Phil Simms, and Armen Keteyian
- Recap, Game Book

Game information

**First quarter**

- DAL – Jackie Harris 13-yard pass from Troy Aikman (Tim Seder kick), 7:41. Cowboys 7–0. **Drive: 10 plays, 64 yards, 5:10.**

**Second quarter**

- JAX – Mike Hollis 42-yard field goal, 9:33. Cowboys 7–3. **Drive: 5 plays, 44 yards, 2:25.**
- JAX – Kyle Brady 3-yard pass from Mark Brunell (Mike Hollis kick), 1:20. Jaguars 10–7. **Drive: 12 plays, 80 yards, 6:01.**
- JAX – Alvis Whitted 3-yard pass from Mark Brunell (Mike Hollis kick), 0:09. Jaguars 17–7. **Drive: 4 plays, 21 yards, 0:13.**

**Third quarter**

- DAL – Tim Seder 19-yard field goal, 7:01. Jaguars 17–10. **Drive: 14 plays, 79 yards, 7:59.**

**Fourth quarter**

- DAL – Randall Cunningham 1-yard run (Tim Seder kick), 1:07. Tied 17–17. **Drive: 6 plays, 71 yards, 2:52.**

**Overtime**

- JAX – Alvis Whitted 37-yard pass from Mark Brunell (Mike Hollis kick), 11:16. Jaguars 23–17. **Drive: 7 plays, 66 yards, 3:44.**

Top passers

- JAX – Mark Brunell – 20/24, 231 yards, 3 TD
- DAL – Randall Cunningham – 13/20, 177 yards, INT

Top rushers

- JAX – Fred Taylor – 31 rushes, 107 yards
- DAL – Emmitt Smith – 24 rushes, 102 yards

Top receivers

- JAX – Kyle Brady – 10 receptions, 138 yards, TD
- DAL – James McKnight – 6 receptions, 113 yards

==== Week 11: vs. Seattle Seahawks ====
Week Eleven: Seattle Seahawks at Jacksonville Jaguars – Game summary

Quarter	1	2	3	4	Total
**Seahawks**	0	14	7	7	**28**
Jaguars	7	14	0	0	**21**

at Alltel Stadium, Jacksonville, Florida

- Date: November 12, 2000
- Game time: 1:00 p.m. EST
- Game weather: 69 °F (21 °C)
- Game attendance: 68,063
- Referee: Tom White
- TV announcers (CBS): Don Criqui and Steve Tasker
- Recap, Game Book

Game information

**First quarter**

- JAX – Mark Brunell 2-yard run (Mike Hollis kick), 2:13. Jaguars 7–0. **Drive: 10 plays, 64 yards, 5:25.**

**Second quarter**

- SEA – Ricky Watters 1-yard run (Rian Lindell kick), 11:24. Tied 7–7. **Drive: 12 plays, 79 yards, 5:49.**
- JAX – Fred Taylor 10-yard run (Mike Hollis kick), 3:00. Jaguars 14–7. **Drive: 7 plays, 66 yards, 3:08.**
- JAX – Keenan McCardell 22-yard pass from Mark Brunell (Mike Hollis kick), 1:16. Jaguars 21–7. **Drive: 3 plays, 70 yards, 0:37.**
- SEA – Sean Dawkins 15-yard pass from Jon Kitna (Rian Lindell kick), 0:13. Jaguars 21–14. **Drive: 9 plays, 67 yards, 1:03.**

**Third quarter**

- SEA – Derrick Mayes 8-yard pass from Jon Kitna (Rian Lindell kick), 4:17. Tied 21–21. **Drive: 14 plays, 74 yards, 7:51.**

**Fourth quarter**

- SEA – Ricky Watters 4-yard pass from Jon Kitna (Rian Lindell kick), 2:01. Seahawks 28–21. **Drive: 8 plays, 67 yards, 2:22.**

**Top passers**

- SEA – Jon Kitna – 22/33, 231 yards, 3 TD
- JAX – Mark Brunell – 24/33, 340 yards, TD

**Top rushers**

- SEA – Ricky Watters – 24 rushes, 80 yards, TD
- JAX – Fred Taylor – 21 rushes, 103 yards, TD

**Top receivers**

- SEA – Sean Dawkins – 6 receptions, 92 yards, TD
- JAX – Keenan McCardell – 6 receptions, 156 yards, TD

==== Week 12: at Pittsburgh Steelers ====
Week Twelve: Jacksonville Jaguars at Pittsburgh Steelers – Game summary

Quarter	1	2	3	4	Total
**Jaguars**	0	17	17	0	**34**
Steelers	7	3	0	14	**24**

at Three Rivers Stadium, Pittsburgh, Pennsylvania

- Date: November 19, 2000
- Game time: 8:35 p.m. EST
- Game weather: Partly cloudy, 35 °F (2 °C)
- Game attendance: 50,925
- Referee: Gerry Austin
- TV announcers (ESPN): Mike Patrick, Joe Theismann, Paul Maguire, and Solomon Wilcots
- Recap, Game Book

Game information

**First quarter**

- PIT – Hines Ward 32-yard pass from Kordell Stewart (Kris Brown kick), 4:10. Steelers 7–0. **Drive: 2 plays, 37 yards, 1:05.**

**Second quarter**

- JAX – Fred Taylor 25-yard run (Mike Hollis kick), 9:16. Tied 7–7. **Drive: 5 plays, 56 yards, 3:48.**
- PIT – Kris Brown 40-yard field goal, 5:49. Steelers 10–7. **Drive: 8 plays, 54 yards, 3:27.**
- JAX – Fred Taylor 16-yard pass from Mark Brunell (Mike Hollis kick), 1:20. Jaguars 14–10. **Drive: 8 plays, 65 yards, 4:29.**
- JAX – Mike Hollis 36-yard field goal, 0:04. Jaguars 17–10. **Drive: 6 plays, 21 yards, 0:35.**

**Third quarter**

- JAX – Mike Hollis 33-yard field goal, 8:49. Jaguars 20–10. **Drive: 10 plays, 55 yards, 4:57.**
- JAX – Fred Taylor 2-yard run (Mike Hollis kick), 8:04. Jaguars 27–10. **Drive: 2 plays, 36 yards, 0:45.**
- JAX – Fred Taylor 26-yard run (Mike Hollis kick), 3:27. Jaguars 34–10. **Drive: 4 plays, 58 yards, 1:33.**

**Fourth quarter**

- PIT – Kordell Stewart 2-yard run (pass failed), 14:55. Jaguars 34–16. **Drive: 8 plays, 66 yards, 3:32.**
- PIT – Kordell Stewart 45-yard run (run succeeded), 7:42. Jaguars 34–24. **Drive: 7 plays, 56 yards, 2:54.**

Top passers

- JAX – Mark Brunell – 17/31, 190 yards, TD, INT
- PIT – Kordell Stewart – 13/27, 188 yards, TD, 2 INT

Top rushers

- JAX – Fred Taylor – 30 rushes, 234 yards, 3 TD
- PIT – Kordell Stewart – 6 rushes, 59 yards, 2 TD

Top receivers

- JAX – Jimmy Smith – 6 receptions, 85 yards
- PIT – Bobby Shaw – 5 receptions, 81 yards

==== Week 13: vs. Tennessee Titans ====
Week Thirteen: Tennessee Titans at Jacksonville Jaguars – Game summary

Quarter	1	2	3	4	Total
Titans	7	3	0	3	**13**
**Jaguars**	10	0	3	3	**16**

at Alltel Stadium, Jacksonville, Florida

- Date: November 26, 2000
- Game time: 4:15 p.m. EST
- Game weather: 62 °F (17 °C)
- Game attendance: 65,454
- Referee: Johnny Grier
- TV announcers (CBS): Kevin Harlan, Daryl Johnston, and Beasley Reece
- Recap, Game Book

Game information

**First quarter**

- JAX – Mike Hollis 27-yard field goal, 10:50. Jaguars 3–0. **Drive: 9 plays, 65 yards, 4:10.**
- TEN – Eddie George 7-yard run (Al Del Greco kick), 5:19. Titans 7–3. **Drive: 9 plays, 69 yards, 5:31.**
- JAX – Fred Taylor 10-yard pass from Mark Brunell (Mike Hollis kick), 2:07. Jaguars 10–7. **Drive: 6 plays, 74 yards, 3:12.**

**Second quarter**

- TEN – Al Del Greco 30-yard field goal, 7:35. Tied 10–10. **Drive: 8 plays, 71 yards, 4:25.**

**Third quarter**

- JAX – Mike Hollis 20-yard field goal, 8:38. Jaguars 13–10. **Drive: 9 plays, 32 yards, 4:36.**

**Fourth quarter**

- TEN – Al Del Greco 38-yard field goal, 14:55. Tied 13–13. **Drive: 7 plays, 15 yards, 3:01.**
- JAX – Mike Hollis 38-yard field goal, 0:00. Jaguars 16–13. **Drive: 10 plays, 61 yards, 3:08.**

**Top passers**

- TEN – Steve McNair – 13/24, 228 yards
- JAX – Mark Brunell – 15/25, 237 yards, TD, 2 INT

**Top rushers**

- TEN – Eddie George – 24 rushes, 69 yards, TD
- JAX – Fred Taylor – 24 rushes, 104 yards

**Top receivers**

- TEN – Eddie George – 7 receptions, 109 yards
- JAX – Keenan McCardell – 3 receptions, 53 yards

==== Week 14: vs. Cleveland Browns ====
Week Fourteen: Cleveland Browns at Jacksonville Jaguars – Game summary

Quarter	1	2	3	4	Total
Browns	0	0	0	0	**0**
**Jaguars**	3	17	21	7	**48**

at Alltel Stadium, Jacksonville, Florida

- Date: December 3, 2000
- Game time: 4:15 p.m. EST
- Game weather: 46 °F (8 °C)
- Game attendance: 51,262
- Referee: Ron Blum
- TV announcers (CBS): Don Criqui and Steve Tasker
- Recap, Game Book

Game information

**First quarter**

- JAX – Mike Hollis 40-yard field goal, 10:44. Jaguars 3–0. **Drive: 11 plays, 32 yards, 4:16.**

**Second quarter**

- JAX – Fred Taylor 3-yard run (Mike Hollis kick), 14:56. Jaguars 10–0. **Drive: 6 plays, 44 yards, 1:58.**
- JAX – Mike Hollis 24-yard field goal, 3:09. Jaguars 13–0. **Drive: 11 plays, 52 yards, 4:59.**
- JAX – Keenan McCardell 14-yard pass from Mark Brunell (Mike Hollis kick), 0:28. Jaguars 20–0. **Drive: 8 plays, 64 yards, 1:55.**

**Third quarter**

- JAX – Fred Taylor 2-yard run (Mike Hollis kick), 7:45. Jaguars 27–0. **Drive: 6 plays, 48 yards, 2:39.**
- JAX – Mark Brunell 8-yard run (Mike Hollis kick), 7:20. Jaguars 34–0. **Drive: 1 play, 8 yards, 0:06.**
- JAX – Fred Taylor 1-yard run (Mike Hollis kick), 1:33. Jaguars 41–0. **Drive: 6 plays, 69 yards, 3:31.**

**Fourth quarter**

- JAX – Shyrone Stith 3-yard run (Mike Hollis kick), 5:27. Jaguars 48–0. **Drive: 8 plays, 39 yards, 4:50.**

**Top passers**

- CLE – Spergon Wynn – 5/16, 17 yards
- JAX – Mark Brunell – 15/31, 165 yards, TD

**Top rushers**

- CLE – Travis Prentice – 10 rushes, 33 yards
- JAX – Fred Taylor – 30 rushes, 181 yards, 3 TD

**Top receivers**

- CLE – Jamel White – 2 receptions, 11 yards
- JAX – Jimmy Smith – 6 receptions, 104 yards

==== Week 15: vs. Arizona Cardinals ====
Week Fifteen: Arizona Cardinals at Jacksonville Jaguars – Game summary

Quarter	1	2	3	4	Total
Cardinals	0	3	0	7	**10**
**Jaguars**	10	17	10	7	**44**

at Alltel Stadium, Jacksonville, Florida

- Date: December 10, 2000
- Game time: 1:00 p.m. EST
- Game weather: 61 °F (16 °C)
- Game attendance: 53,472
- Referee: Mike Carey
- TV announcers (FOX): Thom Brennaman, Jeff Lageman, and Ryan Elijah
- Recap, Game Book

Game information

**First quarter**

- JAX – Mike Hollis 36-yard field goal, 9:11. Jaguars 3–0. **Drive: 11 plays, 52 yards, 5:49.**
- JAX – Fred Taylor 1-yard run (Mike Hollis kick), 7:15. Jaguars 10–0. **Drive: 3 plays, 40 yards, 1:00.**

**Second quarter**

- JAX – Kyle Brady 8-yard pass from Mark Brunell (Mike Hollis kick), 12:49. Jaguars 17–0. **Drive: 5 plays, 63 yards, 2:23.**
- JAX – Fred Taylor 4-yard run (Mike Hollis kick), 6:31. Jaguars 24–0. **Drive: 10 plays, 79 yards, 5:14.**
- ARI – Cary Blanchard 32-yard field goal, 1:08. Jaguars 24–3. **Drive: 12 plays, 66 yards, 5:23.**
- JAX – Mike Hollis 50-yard field goal, 0:04. Jaguars 27–3. **Drive: 6 plays, 37 yards, 1:04.**

**Third quarter**

- JAX – Mike Hollis 40-yard field goal, 9:04. Jaguars 30–3. **Drive: 9 plays, 45 yards, 4:40.**
- JAX – Keenan McCardell 25-yard pass from Mark Brunell (Mike Hollis kick), 5:33. Jaguars 37–3. **Drive: 5 plays, 53 yards, 2:05.**

**Fourth quarter**

- JAX – Jimmy Smith 65-yard pass from Jaime Martin (Mike Hollis kick), 14:27. Jaguars 44–3. **Drive: 1 play, 65 yards, 0:11.**
- ARI – Frank Sanders 26-yard pass from Chris Greisen (Cary Blanchard kick), 9:45. Jaguars 44–10. **Drive: 8 plays, 73 yards, 4:42.**

**Top passers**

- ARI – Dave Brown – 11/19, 135 yards, INT
- JAX – Mark Brunell – 13/18, 182 yards, 2 TD

**Top rushers**

- ARI – Thomas Jones – 7 rushes, 40 yards
- JAX – Fred Taylor – 23 rushes, 137 yards, 2 TD

**Top receivers**

- ARI – Frank Sanders – 4 receptions, 90 yards, TD
- JAX – Jimmy Smith – 8 receptions, 147 yards, TD

==== Week 16: at Cincinnati Bengals ====
Week Sixteen: Jacksonville Jaguars at Cincinnati Bengals – Game summary

Quarter	1	2	3	4	Total
Jaguars	0	7	7	0	**14**
**Bengals**	0	0	7	10	**17**

at Paul Brown Stadium, Cincinnati, Ohio

- Date: December 17, 2000
- Game time: 1:00 p.m. EST
- Game weather: Cloudy, snow flurries, 9 °F (−13 °C)
- Game attendance: 50,469
- Referee: Jeff Triplette
- TV announcers (CBS): Tim Brando and Spencer Tillman
- Recap, Game Book

Game information

**First quarter**

- No scoring plays.

**Second quarter**

- JAX – Jimmy Smith 3-yard pass from Mark Brunell (Mike Hollis kick), 0:27. Jaguars 7–0. **Drive: 5 plays, 33 yards, 1:26.**

**Third quarter**

- CIN – Peter Warrick 85-yard punt return (Neil Rackers kick), 10:57. Tied 7–7.
- JAX – Fred Taylor 5-yard run (Mike Hollis kick), 4:57. Jaguars 14–7. **Drive: 3 plays, 11 yards, 1:17.**

**Fourth quarter**

- CIN – Scott Mitchell 12-yard run (Neil Rackers kick), 1:15. Tied 14–14. **Drive: 10 plays, 80 yards, 3:22.**
- CIN – Neil Rackers 27-yard field goal, 0:00. Bengals 17–14. **Drive: 5 plays, 25 yards, 1:07.**

Top passers

- JAX – Mark Brunell – 19/28, 170 yards, TD
- CIN – Scott Mitchell – 10/22, 171 yards, INT

Top rushers

- JAX – Fred Taylor – 32 rushes, 110 yards, TD
- CIN – Corey Dillon – 17 rushes, 76 yards

Top receivers

- JAX – Keenan McCardell – 4 receptions, 61 yards
- CIN – Danny Farmer – 5 receptions, 102 yards

==== Week 17: at New York Giants ====
Week Seventeen: Jacksonville Jaguars at New York Giants – Game summary

Quarter	1	2	3	4	Total
Jaguars	0	7	3	15	**25**
**Giants**	7	0	0	21	**28**

at Giants Stadium, East Rutherford, New Jersey

- Date: December 23, 2000
- Game time: 12:30 p.m. EST
- Game weather: Sunny, 23 °F (−5 °C)
- Game attendance: 77,924
- Referee: Dick Hantak
- TV announcers (CBS): Greg Gumbel, Phil Simms, Armen Keteyian and Bonnie Bernstein
- Recap, Game Book

Game information

**First quarter**

- NYG – Tiki Barber 3-yard run (Brad Daluiso kick), 0:45. Giants 7–0. **Drive: 12 plays, 58 yards, 5:42.**

**Second quarter**

- JAX – Fred Taylor 44-yard run (Mike Hollis kick), 13:23. Tied 7–7. **Drive: 7 plays, 74 yards, 2:22.**

**Third quarter**

- JAX – Mike Hollis 36-yard field goal, 13:19. Jaguars 10–7. **Drive: 4 plays, 5 yards, 1:26.**

**Fourth quarter**

- NYG – Ike Hilliard 5-yard pass from Kerry Collins (Brad Daluiso kick), 11:11. Giants 14–10. **Drive: 7 plays, 75 yards, 2:49.**
- NYG – Amani Toomer 54-yard pass from Kerry Collins (Brad Daluiso kick), 3:05. Giants 21–10. **Drive: 2 plays, 55 yards, 0:19.**
- JAX – Kyle Brady 5-yard pass from Mark Brunell (Brunell-Brady pass), 1:56. Giants 21–18. **Drive: 3 plays, 61 yards, 1:09.**
- NYG – Jason Sehorn 38-yard kickoff return (Brad Daluiso kick), 1:51. Giants 28–18.
- JAX – Alvis Whitted 12-yard pass from Mark Brunell (Mike Hollis kick), 0:19. Giants 28–25. **Drive: 6 plays, 51 yards, 1:32.**

**Top passers**

- JAX – Mark Brunell – 23/41, 262 yards, 2 TD, INT
- NYG – Kerry Collins – 22/39, 321 yards, 2 TD, INT

**Top rushers**

- JAX – Fred Taylor – 13 rushes, 52 yards, TD
- NYG – Tiki Barber – 24 rushes, 78 yards, TD

**Top receivers**

- JAX – Keenan McCardell – 11 receptions, 131 yards
- NYG – Amani Toomer – 8 receptions, 193 yards, TD

=== Standings ===
AFC Central
	W	L	T	PCT	PF	PA	STK
^{(1)} Tennessee Titans	13	3	0	.813	346	191	W4
^{(4)} Baltimore Ravens	12	4	0	.750	333	165	W7
Pittsburgh Steelers	9	7	0	.563	321	255	W2
Jacksonville Jaguars	7	9	0	.438	367	327	L2
Cincinnati Bengals	4	12	0	.250	185	359	L1
Cleveland Browns	3	13	0	.188	161	419	L5

== Awards and records ==
- Mark Brunell, AFC Offensive Player of the Week, week 9
- Mark Brunell, Franchise Record (tied), Most Touchdown Passes in One Season, 20 Passes
- Mike Hollis, Franchise Record (tied), Most Field Goals in One Game, 5 Field Goals (September 10, 2000)
- Brad Meester, PFW/PFWA All-Rookie Team
- Jimmy Smith, Franchise Record, Most Receiving Yards in One Game, 291 yards, September 10, 2000
- Fred Taylor, AFC Offensive Player of the Week, week 12
- Fred Taylor, Franchise Record, Most Rushing Yards in One Game, 234 Yards, November 19, 2000
- Fred Taylor, Franchise Record, Most Rushing Yards in One Season, 1,399 yards
