= Jacksonville Jaguars draft history =

This page is a list of the Jacksonville Jaguars NFL draft selections. The first draft the Jaguars participated in was 1995, in which they made offensive tackle Tony Boselli of USC their first-ever selection.

== Key ==
= Pro Bowler
= Hall of Famer

== 1995 draft ==
Round	Pick #	Overall	Name	Position	College
1	2	2	Tony Boselli	Offensive tackle	USC
1	19	19	James Stewart	Running back	Tennessee
2	8	40	Brian DeMarco	Offensive tackle	Michigan State
2	32	64	Bryan Schwartz	Linebacker	Augustana (S.D.)
3	7	71	Chris Hudson	Safety	Colorado
4	1	99	Rob Johnson	Quarterback	USC
4	25	123	Mike Thompson	Defensive tackle	Wisconsin
5	35	169	Ryan Christopherson	Running back	Wyoming
6	1	172	Marcus Price	Offensive tackle	LSU
7	11	219	Curtis Marsh	Wide receiver	Utah

== 1996 draft ==
Round	Pick #	Overall	Name	Position	College
1	2	2	Kevin Hardy	Linebacker	Illinois
2	3	33	Tony Brackens	Defensive end	Texas
2	30	60	Michael Cheever	Center	Georgia Tech
3	2	63	Aaron Beasley	Cornerback	West Virginia
4	15	110	Reggie Barlow	Wide receiver	Alabama State
5	14	146	Jimmy Herndon	Guard	Houston
6	3	170	John Fisher	Defensive back	Missouri Western
6	18	185	Chris Doering	Wide receiver	Florida
7	18	227	Clarence Jones	Wide receiver	Tennessee State
7	19	228	Gregory Spann	Wide receiver	Jackson State

== 1997 draft ==
Round	Pick #	Overall	Name	Position	College
1	21	21	Renaldo Wynn	Defensive tackle	Notre Dame
2	20	50	Mike Logan	Cornerback	West Virginia
3	19	79	James Hamilton	Linebacker	North Carolina
4	18	114	Seth Payne	Defensive tackle	Cornell
5	17	147	Damon Jones	Tight end	Southern Illinois
6	21	184	Daimon Shelton	Fullback	Sacramento State
7	20	221	Jon Hesse	Linebacker	Nebraska

== 1998 draft ==
Round	Pick #	Overall	Name	Position	College
1	9	9	Fred Taylor	Running back	Florida
1	25	25	Donovin Darius	Safety	Syracuse
2	27	57	Cordell Taylor	Cornerback	Hampton
3	25	86	Jonathan Quinn	Quarterback	Middle Tennessee State
4	9	101	Tavian Banks	Running back	Iowa
4	26	118	Harry Deligianis	Linebacker	Youngstown State
5	25	148	John Wade	Center	Marshall
6	26	179	Lamanzer Williams	Defensive end	Minnesota
6	29	182	Kevin McLeod	Running back	Auburn
7	3	192	Alvis Whitted	Wide receiver	North Carolina State
7	25	214	Brandon Tolbert	Linebacker	Georgia

== 1999 draft ==
Round	Pick #	Overall	Name	Position	College
1	26	26	Fernando Bryant	Cornerback	Alabama
2	25	56	Larry Smith	Defensive tackle	Florida State
3	27	88	Anthony Cesario	Guard	Colorado State
4	26	121	Kevin Landolt	Defensive tackle	West Virginia
5	26	150	Jason Craft	Cornerback	Colorado State
6	13	182	Emarlos Leroy	Defensive tackle	Georgia
7	36	242	Dee Moronkola	Defensive back	Washington State
7	40	246	Chris White	Defensive end	Southern

== 2000 draft ==
Round	Pick #	Overall	Name	Position	College
1	29	29	R. Jay Soward	Wide receiver	USC
2	29	60	Brad Meester	Center	Northern Iowa
3	30	92	T. J. Slaughter	Linebacker	Southern Miss
4	29	123	Joey Chustz	Offensive tackle	Louisiana Tech
5	30	159	Kiwaukee Thomas	Cornerback	Georgia Southern
6	30	196	Emanuel Smith	Wide receiver	Arkansas
7	30	236	Erik Olson	Defensive back	Colorado State
7	35	241	Rob Meier	Defensive tackle	Washington State
7	37	243	Shyrone Stith	Running back	Virginia Tech
7	39	245	Danny Clark	Linebacker	Illinois
7	41	247	Mark Baniewicz	Offensive tackle	Syracuse

== 2001 draft ==
Round	Pick #	Overall	Name	Position	College
1	13	13	Marcus Stroud	Defensive tackle	Georgia
2	12	43	Maurice Williams	Offensive tackle	Michigan
3	11	73	Eric Westmoreland	Linebacker	Tennessee
3	32	94	James Boyd	Defensive back	Penn State
5	11	142	David Leaverton	Punter	Tennessee
6	7	170	Chad Ward	Guard	Washington
7	13	213	Anthony Denman	Linebacker	Notre Dame
7	33	233	Marlon McCree	Safety	Kentucky
7	35	235	Richmond Flowers	Wide receiver	Tennessee-Chattanooga
7	41	241	Randy Chevrier	Defensive tackle	McGill

== 2002 draft ==
Round	Pick #	Overall	Name	Position	College
1	9	9	John Henderson	Defensive tackle	Tennessee
2	8	40	Mike Pearson	Offensive tackle	Florida
3	24	89	Akin Ayodele	Linebacker	Purdue
4	10	108	David Garrard	Quarterback	East Carolina
4	20	118	Chris Luzar	Tight end	Virginia
6	8	180	Clenton Ballard	Defensive tackle	Southwest Texas State
7	11	222	Kendall Newson	Wide receiver	Middle Tennessee State
7	36	247	Steve Smith	Defensive back	Oregon
7	37	248	Hayden Epstein	Kicker	Michigan

== 2003 draft ==
Round	Pick #	Overall	Name	Position	College
1	7	7	Byron Leftwich	Quarterback	Marshall
2	7	39	Rashean Mathis	Cornerback	Bethune-Cookman
3	8	72	Vince Manuwai	Guard	Hawaii
4	7	104	George Wrighster	Tight end	Oregon
4	35	132	LaBrandon Toefield	Running back	LSU
6	3	176	Brandon Green	Defensive end	Rice
6	6	179	David Young	Safety	Georgia Southern
6	20	193	Marques Ogden	Offensive tackle	Howard
7	4	218	Malaefou MacKenzie	Fullback	USC

== 2004 draft ==
Round	Pick #	Overall	Name	Position	College
1	9	9	Reggie Williams	Wide receiver	Washington
2	7	39	Daryl Smith	Linebacker	Georgia Tech
2	23	55	Greg Jones	Fullback	Florida State
3	23	86	Jorge Cordova	Linebacker	Nevada
4	22	118	Anthony Maddox	Defensive tackle	Delta State
4	24	120	Ernest Wilford	Wide receiver	Virginia Tech
5	5	137	Josh Scobee	Kicker	Louisiana Tech
5	18	150	Chris Thompson	Cornerback	Nicholls State
5	27	159	Sean Bubin	Offensive tackle	Illinois
7	48	249	Bobby McCray	Defensive end	Florida

== 2005 draft ==
Round	Pick #	Overall	Name	Position	College
1	21	21	Matt Jones	Wide receiver	Arkansas
2	20	52	Khalif Barnes	Offensive tackle	Washington
3	23	87	Scott Starks	Cornerback	Wisconsin
4	26	127	Alvin Pearman	Running back	Virginia
5	21	157	Gerald Sensabaugh	Safety	North Carolina
6	11	185	Chad Owens	Wide receiver	Hawaii
6	20	194	Pat Thomas	Linebacker	North Carolina State
7	23	237	Chris Roberson	Cornerback	Eastern Michigan

== 2006 draft ==
Round	Pick #	Overall	Name	Position	College
1	28	28	Marcedes Lewis	Tight end	UCLA
2	28	60	Maurice Jones-Drew	Running back	UCLA
3	16	80	Clint Ingram	Linebacker	Oklahoma
5	28	160	Brent Hawkins	Defensive end	Illinois State
7	5	213	James Wyche	Defensive end	Syracuse
7	28	236	Dee Webb	Cornerback	Florida

== 2007 draft ==
Round	Pick #	Overall	Name	Position	College
1	21	21	Reggie Nelson	Safety	Florida
2	16	48	Justin Durant	Linebacker	Hampton
3	15	79	Mike Sims-Walker	Wide receiver	Central Florida
4	2	101	Adam Podlesh	Punter	Maryland
4	14	113	Brian Smith	Defensive end	Missouri
5	12	149	Uche Nwaneri	Guard	Purdue
5	13	150	Josh Gattis	Safety	Wake Forest
5	29	166	Derek Landri	Defensive tackle	Notre Dame
7	19	229	John Broussard	Wide receiver	San Jose State
7	41	251	Chad Nkang	Defensive back	Elon
7	42	252	Andrew Carnahan	Offensive tackle	Arizona State

== 2008 draft ==
Round	Pick #	Overall	Name	Position	College
1	8	8	Derrick Harvey	Defensive end	Florida
2	21	52	Quentin Groves	Defensive end	Auburn
5	20	155	Thomas Williams	Linebacker	USC
5	24	159	Trae Williams	Cornerback	South Florida
7	6	213	Chauncey Washington	Running back	USC

== 2009 draft ==
Round	Pick #	Overall	Name	Position	College
1	8	8	Eugene Monroe	Offensive tackle	Virginia
2	7	39	Eben Britton	Offensive tackle	Arizona
3	8	72	Terrance Knighton	Defensive tackle	Temple
3	9	73	Derek Cox	Cornerback	William & Mary
4	7	107	Mike Thomas	Wide receiver	Arizona
5	8	144	Jarett Dillard	Wide receiver	Rice
6	7	180	Zach Miller	Tight end	Nebraska-Omaha
7	41	250	Rashad Jennings	Running back	Liberty
7	44	253	Tiquan Underwood	Wide receiver	Rutgers

== 2010 draft ==
Round	Pick #	Overall	Name	Position	College
1	10	10	Tyson Alualu	Defensive tackle	California
3	10	74	D'Anthony Smith	Defensive tackle	Louisiana Tech
5	12	143	Larry Hart	Defensive end	Central Arkansas
5	22	153	Austen Lane	Defensive end	Murray State
6	11	180	Deji Karim	Running back	Southern Illinois
6	34	203	Scotty McGee	Cornerback	James Madison

== 2011 draft ==
Round	Pick #	Overall	Name	Position	College
1	10	10	Blaine Gabbert	Quarterback	Missouri
3	12	76	Will Rackley	Guard	Lehigh
4	17	114	Cecil Shorts III	Wide receiver	Mount Union
4	24	121	Chris Prosinski	Safety	Wyoming
5	16	147	Rod Issac	Cornerback	Middle Tennessee State

== 2012 draft ==
Round	Pick #	Overall	Name	Position	College
1	5	5	Justin Blackmon	Wide receiver	Oklahoma State
2	6	38	Andre Branch	Defensive end	Clemson
3	7	70	Bryan Anger	Punter	California
5	7	142	Brandon Marshall	Linebacker	Nevada
6	6	176	Mike Harris	Cornerback	Florida State
7	21	228	Jeris Pendleton	Defensive tackle	Ashland

== 2013 draft ==
Round	Pick #	Overall	Name	Position	College
1	2	2	Luke Joeckel	Offensive tackle	Texas A&M
2	1	33	Johnathan Cyprien	Safety	Florida International
3	2	64	Dwayne Gratz	Cornerback	Connecticut
4	4	101	Ace Sanders	Wide receiver	South Carolina
5	2	135	Denard Robinson	Running back	Michigan
6	1	169	Josh Evans	Safety	Florida
7	2	208	Jeremy Harris	Cornerback	New Mexico State
7	4	210	Demetrius McCray	Cornerback	Appalachian State

== 2014 draft ==
Round	Pick #	Overall	Name	Position	College
1	3	3	Blake Bortles	Quarterback	Central Florida
2	7	39	Marqise Lee	Wide receiver	USC
2	29	61	Allen Robinson	Wide receiver	Penn State
3	29	93	Brandon Linder	Guard	Miami (FL)
4	14	114	Aaron Colvin	Cornerback	Oklahoma
5	4	144	Telvin Smith	Linebacker	Florida State
5	19	159	Chris Smith	Defensive end	Arkansas
6	29	205	Luke Bowanko	Center	Virginia
7	7	222	Storm Johnson	Running back	Central Florida

== 2015 draft ==
Round	Pick #	Overall	Name	Position	College
1	3	3	Dante Fowler	Defensive end	Florida
2	4	36	T. J. Yeldon	Running back	Alabama
3	3	67	A. J. Cann	Guard	South Carolina
4	5	104	James Sample	Safety	Louisville
5	3	139	Rashad Greene	Wide receiver	Florida State
6	4	180	Michael Bennett	Defensive tackle	Ohio State
7	3	220	Neal Sterling	Wide receiver	Monmouth
7	12	229	Ben Koyack	Tight end	Notre Dame

== 2016 draft ==
Round	Pick #	Overall	Name	Position	College
1	5	5	Jalen Ramsey	Cornerback	Florida State
2	5	36	Myles Jack	Linebacker	UCLA
3	6	69	Yannick Ngakoue	Defensive end	Maryland
4	5	103	Sheldon Day	Defensive tackle	Notre Dame
6	6	181	Tyrone Holmes	Linebacker	Montana
6	26	201	Brandon Allen	Quarterback	Arkansas
7	5	226	Jonathan Woodard	Defensive end	Central Arkansas

== 2017 draft ==
Round	Pick #	Overall	Name	Position	College
1	4	4	Leonard Fournette	Running back	LSU
2	2	34	Cam Robinson	Offensive tackle	Alabama
3	4	68	Dawuane Smoot	Defensive end	Illinois
4	3	110	Dede Westbrook	Wide receiver	Oklahoma
5	4	148	Blair Brown	Linebacker	Ohio
7	4	222	Jalen Myrick	Cornerback	Minnesota
7	22	240	Marquez Williams	Fullback	Miami (FL)

== 2018 draft ==
Round	Pick #	Overall	Name	Position	College
1	29	29	Taven Bryan	Defensive tackle	Florida
2	29	61	D. J. Chark	Wide receiver	LSU
3	29	93	Ronnie Harrison	Safety	Alabama
4	29	129	Will Richardson	Offensive tackle	North Carolina State
6	29	202	Tanner Lee	Quarterback	Nebraska
7	12	230	Leon Jacobs	Linebacker	Wisconsin
7	29	247	Logan Cooke	Punter	Mississippi State

== 2019 draft ==
Round	Pick #	Overall	Name	Position	College
1	7	7	Josh Allen	Defensive end	Kentucky
2	3	35	Jawaan Taylor	Offensive tackle	Florida
3	5	69	Josh Oliver	Tight end	San Jose State
3	35	98	Quincy Williams	Linebacker	Murray State
5	2	140	Ryquell Armstead	Running back	Temple
6	5	178	Gardner Minshew	Quarterback	Washington State
7	21	235	Dontavius Russell	Defensive tackle	Auburn

== 2020 draft ==
Round	Pick #	Overall	Name	Position	College
1	9	9	C. J. Henderson	Cornerback	Florida
1	20	20	K'Lavon Chaisson	Linebacker	LSU
2	10	42	Laviska Shenault	Wide receiver	Colorado
3	9	73	DaVon Hamilton	Defensive tackle	Ohio State
4	10	116	Ben Bartch	Offensive tackle	Saint John's (MN)
4	31	137	Josiah Scott	Cornerback	Michigan State
4	34	140	Shaquille Quarterman	Linebacker	Miami (FL)
5	12	157	Daniel Thomas	Safety	Auburn
5	20	165	Collin Johnson	Wide receiver	Texas
6	10	189	Jake Luton	Quarterback	Oregon State
6	27	206	Tyler Davis	Tight end	Georgia Tech
7	9	223	Chris Claybrooks	Cornerback	Memphis

== 2021 draft ==
Round	Pick #	Overall	Name	Position	College
1	1	1	Trevor Lawrence	Quarterback	Clemson
1	25	25	Travis Etienne	Running back	Clemson
2	1	33	Tyson Campbell	Cornerback	Georgia
2	13	45	Walker Little	Offensive tackle	Stanford
3	1	65	Andre Cisco	Safety	Syracuse
4	1	106	Jay Tufele	Defensive tackle	USC
4	16	121	Jordan Smith	Defensive end	UAB
5	1	145	Luke Farrell	Tight end	Ohio State
6	25	209	Jalen Camp	Wide receiver	Georgia Tech

== 2022 draft ==
Round	Pick #	Overall	Name	Position	College
1	1	1	Travon Walker	Defensive end	Georgia
1	27	27	Devin Lloyd	Linebacker	Utah
3	1	65	Luke Fortner	Center	Kentucky
3	6	70	Chad Muma	Linebacker	Wyoming
5	11	154	Snoop Conner	Running back	Ole Miss
6	19	197	Gregory Junior	Cornerback	Ouachita Baptist
7	1	222	Montaric Brown	Cornerback	Arkansas

== 2023 draft ==
Round	Pick #	Overall	Name	Position	College
1	27	27	Anton Harrison	Offensive tackle	Oklahoma
2	30	61	Brenton Strange	Tight end	Penn State
3	25	88	Tank Bigsby	Running back	Auburn
4	19	121	Ventrell Miller	Linebacker	Florida
4	28	130	Tyler Lacy	Defensive end	Oklahoma State
5	1	136	Yasir Abdullah	Linebacker	Louisville
5	25	160	Antonio Johnson	Safety	Texas A&M
6	8	185	Parker Washington	Wide receiver	Penn State
6	25	202	Christian Braswell	Cornerback	Rutgers
6	31	208	Erick Hallett	Safety	Pittsburgh
7	9	226	Cooper Hodges	Guard	Appalachian State
7	10	227	Raymond Vohasek	Defensive tackle	North Carolina
7	23	240	Derek Parish	Fullback	Houston

== 2024 draft ==
Round	Pick #	Overall	Name	Position	College
1	23	23	Brian Thomas Jr.	Wide receiver	LSU
2	16	48	Maason Smith	Defensive tackle	LSU
3	33	96	Jarrian Jones	Cornerback	Florida State
4	14	114	Javon Foster	Offensive tackle	Missouri
4	16	116	Jordan Jefferson	Defensive tackle	LSU
5	18	153	Deantre Prince	Cornerback	Mississippi
5	32	167	Keilan Robinson	Running back	Texas
6	36	212	Cam Little	Placekicker	Arkansas
7	16	236	Myles Cole	Defensive end	Texas Tech

== 2025 draft ==
Round	Pick #	Overall	Name	Position	College
1	2	2	Travis Hunter	Cornerback/Wide receiver	Colorado
3	24	87	Caleb Ransaw	Cornerback	Tulane
3	25	88	Wyatt Milum	Guard	West Virginia
4	2	104	Bhayshul Tuten	Running back	Virginia Tech
4	5	107	Jack Kiser	Linebacker	Notre Dame
6	18	194	Jalen McLeod	Linebacker	Auburn
6	24	200	Rayuan Lane III	Safety	Navy
7	5	221	Jonah Monheim	Center	USC
7	20	236	LeQuint Allen	Running back	Syracuse

== 2026 draft ==
Round	Pick #	Overall	Name	Position	College
2	24	56	Nate Boerkircher	Tight end	Texas A&M
3	17	81	Albert Regis	Defensive tackle	Texas A&M
3	24	88	Emmanuel Pregnon	Guard	Oregon
3	36	100	Jalen Huskey	Safety	Maryland
4	19	119	Wesley Williams	Defensive end	Duke
5	24	164	Tanner Koziol	Tight end	Houston
6	10	191	Josh Cameron	Wide receiver	Baylor
6	22	203	CJ Williams	Wide receiver	Stanford
7	17	233	Zach Durfee	Defensive end	Washington
7	24	240	Parker Hughes	Linebacker	Middle Tennessee State

== See also ==
- History of the Jacksonville Jaguars
- List of professional American football drafts
