= Steve Lindsey (American football) =

American football player (born 1974)

No. 2
- Position: Kickoff specialist

Personal information
- Born: November 25, 1974 (age 51); Hattiesburg, Mississippi, U.S.

Career information
- High school: North Forrest
- College: Ole Miss (1993–1997)

Career history
- San Francisco 49ers (1998)*; Jacksonville Jaguars (1999–2000); Denver Broncos (2000–2001)
- * Offseason or practice squad member only
- Stats at Pro Football Reference

Steve Kendall Lindsey (born November 25, 1974) is an American professional football kickoff specialist. He played for the San Francisco 49ers, the Jacksonville Jaguars and the Denver Broncos of the National Football League (NFL).

== Life and career ==
Lindsey was born in Hattiesburg, Mississippi, the son of Mike and Linda Lindsey. He played high school football and baseball at North Forrest High School in Hattiesburg, Mississippi. He then enrolled at the University of Mississippi to play college football for the Ole Miss Rebels, and was a four-time varsity letterman in 1993 and again from 1995 to 1997.

In April 1998, Lindsey joined the San Francisco 49ers of the National Football League (NFL), but was released from the team in July 1998, and in January 1999, he joined the Jacksonville Jaguars. He played in sixteen games during the 1999 NFL season, and played in ten games during the 2000 NFL season, but was released from the team on November 15, 2000. He was replaced by Jim Tarle. The following day, he joined the Denver Broncos, and played in six games. He was released from the team in August 2001.
