= List of Jacksonville Jaguars head coaches =

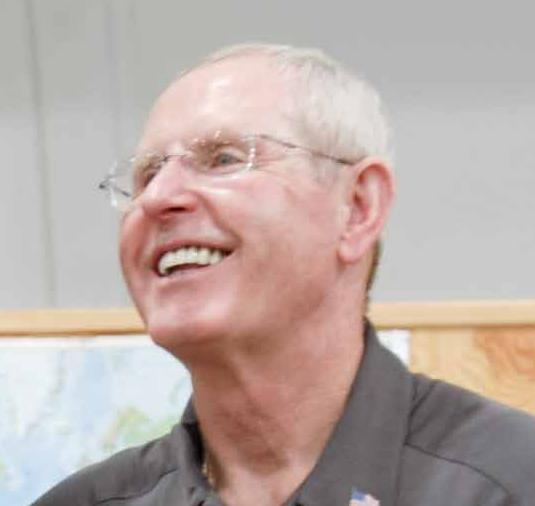
Tom Coughlin, the Jaguars' first coach from 1995 to 2002, is also the most successful coach in Jaguars team history, as measured by playoff appearances, conference championship appearances, and overall winning percentage of games won.

The Jacksonville Jaguars are a professional American football franchise based in Jacksonville, Florida. They are members of the South Division of the American Football Conference (AFC) in the National Football League (NFL). The team, along with the Carolina Panthers, joined the NFL as expansion teams in 1995. The Jaguars, along with the Houston Texans, have never played in a Super Bowl or any other NFL Championship, but have made 3 appearances in AFC Championship games; twice against the New England Patriots after the 1996 and the 2017 seasons, and once against the Tennessee Titans after the 1999 season.

The Jaguars have had nine head coaches since their inaugural 1995 season, including two interim coaches. Tom Coughlin and Jack Del Rio each won 68 games while coaching the Jaguars, though Coughlin is more successful in terms of winning percentage, winning 53.1% of his games in charge. Their current head coach is Liam Coen, who was hired on January 24, 2025.

== History ==
=== Tom Coughlin era (1995–2002) ===
The Jaguars first head coach was Tom Coughlin, who was hired by owner Wayne Weaver well over a year before the team's inaugural season in 1995. The Jaguars won four games their first season, surpassing the previous record of wins for an expansion team (three), but falling well short of the Carolina Panthers record-setting pace that same year of seven wins. The next year, 1996, Coughlin and the Jaguars went to the AFC Championship game, a feat repeated in 1999, but both years the Jaguars fell short of the Super Bowl. In 2002, Coughlin was fired.

=== Jack Del Rio era (2003–2011) ===
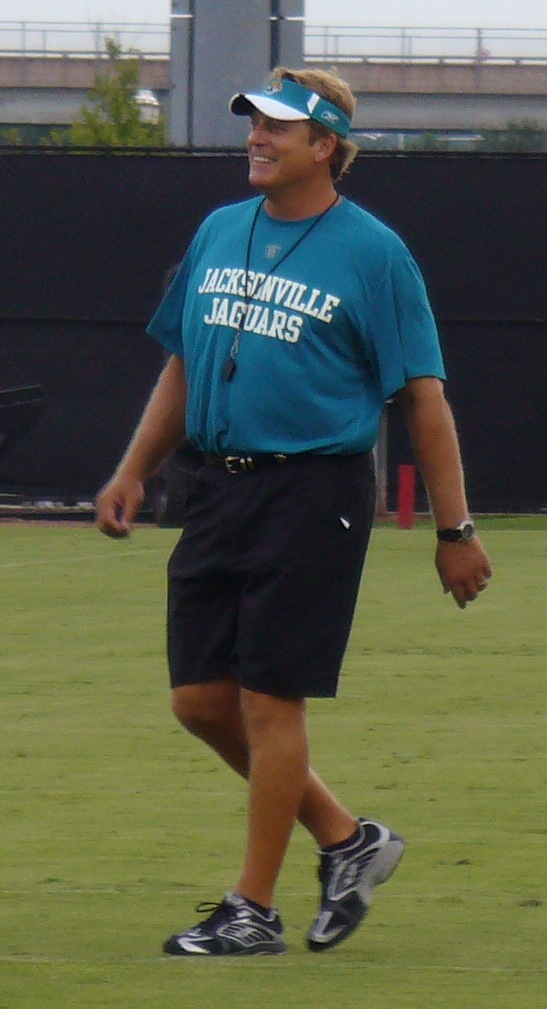
Jack Del Rio is the longest-serving head coach of the Jaguars, coaching the franchise between 2003 and 2011

Hired to replace Coughlin was Jack Del Rio. He was hired on January 16, 2003 and fired on November 29, 2011. He was replaced on an interim basis with Mel Tucker. Del Rio coached the team from 2003 to 2011, recording a winning percentage of 48.9% from 139 regular season games, but was fired after going over eight full seasons without winning a division title.

=== Mike Mularkey era (2012) ===
In 2012, Mike Mularkey was hired as head coach. His team was hit by several key injuries throughout the season and managed going on 2–14, the worst record in franchise history at the time. As a result, new owner Shahid Khan decided he wanted new leadership and fired the General Manager (GM), Gene Smith. The new GM, Dave Caldwell, decided to fire Mike Mularkey.

=== Gus Bradley era (2013–2016) ===
In 2013, the Jaguars hired Gus Bradley to become their new head coach.

Bradley served a total of four years as the head coach of the Jaguars (2013–2016), but never was able to make the playoffs. Bradley was fired shortly before the end of the 2016 season, holding a record of 14–48.

=== Doug Marrone era (2016–2020) ===
Doug Marrone replaced Bradley for the final two remaining games of the 2016 season as the interim head coach of the Jaguars. On January 9, 2017, the Jaguars removed the interim tag and hired Marrone to be their fifth head coach. In Marrone's first season as head coach, the Jaguars finished with a 10–6 regular season record in 2017, made the playoffs for the first time since 2007 and made an AFC Conference Championship appearance but were defeated by the New England Patriots. Over the next three seasons under Marrone, the Jaguars finished 4th in the AFC South with losing seasons and failed to make the playoffs for three consecutive seasons. In 2020, Marrone led the Jaguars to a franchise-worst and league worst 1–15 season record in 2020, clinching the Jaguars their first franchise 1st overall pick in the 2021 NFL draft. Following the end of the 2020 season, Marrone was fired on January 4, 2021.

=== Urban Meyer year (2021) ===
On January 14, 2021, Urban Meyer was hired as the sixth head coach of the Jaguars, replacing Doug Marrone.

On February 10, 2021, Meyer hired Chris Doyle out of University of Iowa to become the Jaguars director of sports performance. He was accused of racially motivated actions against Iowa players, which eventually led to a subpoena of both Meyer and then-GM Trent Baalke. Doyle resigned 2 days later.

On September 12, 2021, Meyer began his NFL coaching debut with the Jaguars losing to the Houston Texans by a score of 21–37.

On October 1, 2021, Meyer was publicly reprimanded by Jaguars owner Shad Khan for his behavior seen on social media videos that occurred at his Columbus-area restaurant, Urban Meyer's Pint House. Meyer was seen on video in a bar with a young woman who is not his wife, and appeared to grope the woman. The events took place a day after a loss to the Cincinnati Bengals, dropping the Jaguars' record to 0–4 on the season. He apologized to the team and personnel.

On October 17, 2021, the Jaguars won against the Miami Dolphins by a score of 23–20, earning Meyer his 1st career win as an NFL head coach. The win snapped the Jaguars' 20-game losing streak that dated back to September 13, 2020 – week 1 of the 2020 NFL season.

On November 7, 2021, Meyer and the Jaguars defeated the heavily favored Buffalo Bills by a score of 9–6. Toward the end of the 2021 season, reports surfaced of Jaguars players and coaches being critical of Meyer's treatment of them, to which the team responded with assertions of his job security.

On December 12, 2021, Meyer lost 20–0 to the Tennessee Titans, giving the Jaguars their 1st losing shutout since 2009 at the time.

On December 15, 2021, Meyer was accused of kicking former kicker Josh Lambo during a pregame warmup on August 19, 2021, against the Dallas Cowboys.

On December 16, 2021, Meyer was fired by the Jaguars and the offensive coordinator, Darrell Bevell, was named Meyer's replacement as head coach on an interim basis. Meyer finished his tenure in Jacksonville with a 2–11 (.154) record.

=== Doug Pederson era (2022–2024) ===
On February 3, 2022, Doug Pederson was hired as the seventh permanent head coach and ninth overall head coach of the Jaguars, replacing Urban Meyer.

On January 6, 2025, Doug Pederson was fired by the Jaguars.

=== Liam Coen era (2025–present) ===
On January 24, 2025, Liam Coen was hired as the eighth permanent head coach and tenth overall head coach of the Jaguars, replacing Doug Pederson.

== Key ==
#	Number of coaches (Note: A running total of the number of coaches of the Jaguars. Thus, any coach who has two or more terms as head coach is only counted once.)
Yrs	Years coached
First	First season coached
Last	Last season coached
GC	Games Coached
W	Wins
L	Loses
T	Ties
Win%	Win – Loss percentage
*	Spent entire NFL head coaching career with the Jaguars

== Coaches ==
Note: Statistics are accurate through the end of the 2025 NFL season.

#	Image	Name	Start	End	Regular season					Playoffs			Awards	Ref
#	Image	Name	Start	End	GC	W	L	T	Win%	GC	W	L	Awards	Ref
1		Tom Coughlin	1995	2002	128	68	60	0	.531	8	4	4	2 AFC Central Championships (1996, 1999); 4 Playoff berths	
2		Jack Del Rio	2003	2011 (Note: After 11 games of the 2011 season, with the Jaguars at 3–8 (.273), Del Rio was fired as head coach and replaced by defensive coordinator Mel Tucker on an interim basis.)	139	68	71	0	.489	3	1	2	2 Playoff berths	
3		Mel Tucker*	2011		5	2	3	0	.400	—				
4		Mike Mularkey	2012		16	2	14	0	.125	—				
5		Gus Bradley*	2013	2016 (Note: After week 15 of the 2016 season, with the Jaguars at 2–12 (.143), Bradley was fired as head coach and replaced by offensive line coach Doug Marrone on an interim basis. Marrone interim tag was removed for the 2017 season.)	62	14	48	0	.226	—				
6		Doug Marrone	2016	2020	66	23	43	0	.348	3	2	1	1 AFC South Championship (2017); 1 Playoff berth	
7		Urban Meyer*	2021 (Note: After week 15 of the 2021 season, with the Jaguars at 2–11 (.154), Meyer was fired as head coach and replaced by offensive coordinator Darrell Bevell on an interim basis.)		13	2	11	0	.154	—				
8		Darrell Bevell	2021		4	1	3	0	.250	—				
9		Doug Pederson	2022	2024	51	22	29	0	.431	2	1	1	1 AFC South Championship (2022); 1 Playoff berth	
10		Liam Coen*	2025–present		21	16	5	0	.762	1	0	1	1 AFC South Championship (2025); 1 Playoff berth	

== See also ==
- List of Jacksonville Jaguars players
