= Brant Boyer =

American football player and coach (born 1971)

San Francisco 49ers
- Title: Special teams coordinator

Personal information
- Born: June 27, 1971 (age 55); Ogden, Utah, U.S.
- Listed height: 6 ft 1 in (1.85 m)
- Listed weight: 240 lb (109 kg)

Career information
- Position: Linebacker (No. 52)
- High school: North Summitt (Coalville, Utah)
- College: Snow (1990–1991); Arizona (1992–1993)
- NFL draft: 1994: 6th round, 177th overall pick
- Expansion draft: 1995: 22nd round, 43rd overall pick

Career history

Playing
- Miami Dolphins (1994); Jacksonville Jaguars (1995–2000); Cleveland Browns (2001–2004)

Coaching
- Cleveland Browns (2009) Training camp intern; New York Giants (2010) Training camp intern; Indianapolis Colts (2012–2015) Assistant special teams coach; New York Jets (2016–2024) Special teams coordinator; San Francisco 49ers (2025–present) Special teams coordinator

Awards and highlights
- Second-team All-Pac-10 (1993)

Career NFL statistics
- Tackles: 323
- Sacks: 13
- Interceptions: 6
- Stats at Pro Football Reference

Brant Boyer (born June 27, 1971) is an American former professional football linebacker and coach who is the special teams coordinator for the San Francisco 49ers of the National Football League (NFL).

He was selected by the Jacksonville Jaguars in the 1995 NFL expansion draft after playing his rookie season as a sixth-round draft choice of the Miami Dolphins. After five seasons with the Jaguars, Boyer spent three seasons as a member of the Cleveland Browns.

Currently, Boyer is the special teams coach for the San Francisco 49ers. Previously he was the assistant special teams coach for the Indianapolis Colts and the special teams coach for the New York Jets.

== Early life ==
Boyer went to high school at North Summit in Coalville, Utah.

== College career ==
In 1990, Boyer attended and played college football for Snow College as a linebacker.

In 1992, Boyer transferred to Arizona.

== Professional career ==
=== Miami Dolphins ===
Boyer was selected in the sixth round (177th overall) of the 1994 NFL draft by the Miami Dolphins of the National Football League (NFL). He played in fourteen games for the Dolphins and recorded two total tackles.

=== Jacksonville Jaguars ===
In 1995, Boyer was allocated to the Jacksonville Jaguars for the 1995 NFL Expansion Draft. On March 30, 1997, Boyer re-signed with the Jaguars. In a game against the Pittsburgh Steelers in 1998, he suffered a neck injury and was placed on injured reserve on December 1, 1998.

In six seasons with the Jaguars he played in 69 games while starting seven of them. Boyer recorded 10 sacks and 114 tackles during his tenure with the team.

=== Cleveland Browns ===
In 2001, Boyer signed with the Cleveland Browns. On February 19, 2004, Boyer re-signed with the browns on a four-year deal worth around $4.2 million. On August 30, 2004, Boyer was moved to injured reserve which ended his 2004 campaign and subsequently his career.

In four seasons with the Browns he played in 47 games and started ten, the most of which coming in 2003. He recorded 207 total tackles and thirteen tackles for loss.

== NFL career statistics ==
Legend
**Bold**	Career high

Year	Team	Games		Tackles				Interceptions				Fumbles			
Year	Team	GP	GS	Comb	Solo	Ast	Sck	Int	Yds	TD	Lng	FF	FR	Yds	TD
1994	MIA	14	0	2	1	1	0.0	0	0	0	0	0	0	0	0
1995	JAX	2	0	0	0	0	0.0	0	0	0	0	0	0	0	0
1996	JAX	12	0	5	4	1	0.0	0	0	0	0	0	0	0	0
1997	JAX	16	2	24	18	6	1.5	0	0	0	0	0	0	0	0
1998	JAX	11	0	12	10	2	1.0	0	0	0	0	0	0	0	0
1999	JAX	16	0	41	33	8	**4.0**	1	5	0	5	0	0	0	0
2000	JAX	12	5	32	25	7	3.5	1	**12**	0	**12**	0	0	0	0
2001	CLE	16	2	**79**	**60**	19	0.0	**2**	**12**	0	8	0	0	0	0
2002	CLE	16	1	62	51	11	3.0	1	1	0	1	0	0	0	0
2003	CLE	15	7	66	46	**20**	0.0	1	4	0	4	0	0	0	0
		130	17	323	248	75	13.0	6	34	0	12	0	0	0	0

== Coaching career ==
=== NFL Coaching Intern ===
Boyer began his coaching career as a training camp intern for the Cleveland Browns in 2009 and for the New York Giants as a training camp intern in 2010.

=== Indianapolis Colts ===
From 2012 to 2015 Boyer worked with the Indianapolis Colts special teams. There he worked with all-pros Pat McAfee and Adam Vinatieri.

=== New York Jets ===
On February 2, 2016, Boyer was named the special teams coordinator for the New York Jets. In 2021, despite the Jets 4–13 record, Boyer's special teams squad ranked 2nd in the NFL according to DVOA.

=== San Francisco 49ers ===
After nine years with the Jets, Boyer was named special teams coordinator for the San Francisco 49ers on January 27, 2025.
