= Gannon Shepherd =

American football player (born 1977)

No. 67, 68
- Position: Tackle

Personal information
- Born: January 4, 1977 (age 49); Flint, Michigan
- Listed height: 6 ft 8 in (2.03 m)
- Listed weight: 310 lb (141 kg)

Career information
- High school: Marist (Atlanta, Georgia)
- College: Duke
- NFL draft: 2000: undrafted

Career history
- Chicago Bears (2000)*; Jacksonville Jaguars (2000)*; Chicago Bears (2000)*; Jacksonville Jaguars (2000–2001); Cleveland Browns (2001)*; Atlanta Falcons (2002)*; Houston Texans (2003)*
- * Offseason or practice squad member only
- Stats at Pro Football Reference

Gannon M. Shepherd (born January 4, 1977) is an American former football tackle for the Jacksonville Jaguars and the Cleveland Browns of the National Football League. He played college football at Duke.

== Professional football career ==
=== Chicago Bears ===
The Chicago Bears signed Shepherd on April 28, 2000, to play offensive tackle. He was one of six undrafted rookies in the Bears' training camp that summer. He was released by the Bears on August 23, 2000.

=== Jacksonville Jaguars ===
Shepherd was signed by the Jacksonville Jaguars on December 6, 2000. He did not play in any games during the 2000 season, and played in only one in the 2001 season: a 21–3 win at home over the Pittsburgh Steelers on September 9, 2001. The Jaguars released him on October 30, 2001.

=== Cleveland Browns ===
Shepherd was signed to the Cleveland Browns' practice squad on November 21, 2001.

=== Atlanta Falcons ===
Shepherd was a part of the Atlanta Falcons team during the 2002 off-season. He was waived by the Falcons as part of an injury settlement on September 6, 2002, and released three days later.
