= Blair Brown (American football) =

American football player (born 1994)

No. 53
- Position: Linebacker

Personal information
- Born: May 27, 1994 (age 32); Moreno Valley, California, U.S.
- Listed height: 5 ft 11 in (1.80 m)
- Listed weight: 238 lb (108 kg)

Career information
- High school: Rancho Verde (Moreno Valley)
- College: Ohio
- NFL draft: 2017: 5th round, 148th overall pick

Career history
- Jacksonville Jaguars (2017–2018); Pittsburgh Maulers (2022)

Awards and highlights
- First-team All-MAC (2016)

Career NFL statistics
- Total tackles: 17
- Sacks: 0.5
- Fumble recoveries: 1
- Stats at Pro Football Reference

Blair Brown (born May 27, 1994) is an American former professional football player who was a linebacker in the National Football League (NFL). He played college football for the Ohio Bobcats.

== College career ==
Brown was ranked first in Football Bowl Subdivision (FBS) in tackling efficiency with just three misses and 96 solo tackles while at Ohio University. In 2016, only Reuben Foster had higher overall and run-defense grades according to Pro Football Focus than Brown's 92.4 and 91.5. Brown's 131 total tackles tied for the second-most among FBS inside linebackers. Brown was ranked third in FBS in run-stop percentage and had 47 stops.

== Professional career ==
=== Jacksonville Jaguars ===
Brown was selected by the Jacksonville Jaguars in the fifth round, 148th overall, in the 2017 NFL draft. He played in 28 games for the team before he was released on May 9, 2019.

Brown was charged with domestic battery on May 30, 2019, but had the charges dismissed in July 2020 and the NFL announced in October 2020 he would not receive league discipline for the incident. He worked out for the Houston Texans on October 17, 2020.

=== Pittsburgh Maulers ===
Brown was selected by the Pittsburgh Maulers of the United States Football League (USFL) in the 31st round of the 2022 USFL draft on February 24, 2022. He was transferred to the team's practice squad before the start of the regular season on April 16. He remained on the inactive roster on April 22. He was transferred to the active roster on April 30. He was released on May 5.
