= Reggie Nelson (offensive tackle) =

American football player (born 1976)

No. 66, 79
- Position: Offensive tackle

Personal information
- Born: June 23, 1976 (age 50); Alexandria, Louisiana, U.S.
- Listed height: 6 ft 3 in (1.91 m)
- Listed weight: 321 lb (146 kg)

Career information
- High school: Alexandria
- College: McNeese State
- NFL draft: 1999: 5th round, 141st overall pick

Career history
- San Diego Chargers (1999); Minnesota Vikings (2000)*; Jacksonville Jaguars (2000); Frankfurt Galaxy (2001); Barcelona Dragons (2002); Berlin Thunder (2002); Green Bay Packers (2002)*; Ottawa Renegades (2005)
- * Offseason or practice squad member only
- Stats at Pro Football Reference

Reginald DeWayne Nelson (born June 23, 1976) is an American former professional football player who was an offensive tackle for two seasons in the National Football League (NFL). He played college football for the McNeese State Cowboys and was selected by the San Diego Chargers in the fifth round of the 1999 NFL draft with the 141st overall pick.
