= Danny Clark (American football) =

American football player (born 1977)

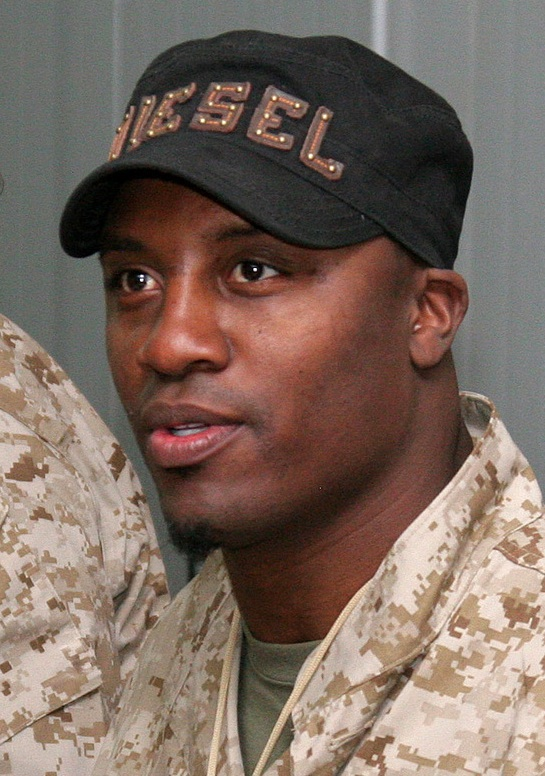
- Clark in 2009

No. 55, 54
- Position: Linebacker

Personal information
- Born: May 9, 1977 (age 49); Blue Island, Illinois, U.S.
- Listed height: 6 ft 2 in (1.88 m)
- Listed weight: 233 lb (106 kg)

Career information
- High school: Hillcrest (Country Club Hills, Illinois)
- College: Illinois
- NFL draft: 2000: 7th round, 245th overall pick

Career history
- Jacksonville Jaguars (2000–2003); Oakland Raiders (2004–2005); New Orleans Saints (2006); Houston Texans (2007); New York Giants (2008–2009); Houston Texans (2010)*; New Orleans Saints (2010)
- * Offseason or practice squad member only

Career NFL statistics
- Total tackles: 689
- Sacks: 7
- Forced fumbles: 9
- Fumble recoveries: 2
- Interceptions: 2
- Stats at Pro Football Reference

Danny Clark IV (born May 9, 1977) is an American former professional football player who was a linebacker in the National Football League (NFL). He was selected by the Jacksonville Jaguars in the seventh round of the 2000 NFL draft. He played college football for the Illinois Fighting Illini.

Clark has previously played for the Oakland Raiders, Houston Texans, New York Giants, and New Orleans Saints.

== Early life ==
Clark was born in Blue Island, Illinois.

He played quarterback and linebacker at Hillcrest High School in Country Club Hills, Illinois, where he was All-conference as a quarterback and linebacker. He was an All-area pick and also chosen All-State as a defensive back. On offense, Clark rushed for 505 yards on 77 attempts and seven touchdowns and passed for 913 yards and five touchdowns as a senior and he also lettered in basketball and baseball.

== College career ==
Clark attended the University of Illinois, where he played for the Fighting Illini football team. He started 44 of 45 games played in 4 seasons was named honorable mention All-Big Ten three times as a linebacker, and finished his college career with the sixth most (384) tackles at Illinois, finishing just ahead of Pro Football Hall of Fame linebacker Dick Butkus. As a senior in 1999, was named honorable mention All-Big Ten after started all 12 games and recorded a career-high 122 tackles, 3 sacks and an interception. He had a team-high 115 tackles as a junior and also had 2 interceptions, 7 passes defensed, a forced fumble and a fumble recovery. Clark graduated Illinois with a bachelor's degree in communications.

== Professional career ==
Pre-draft measurables
| Height | Weight | Arm length | Hand span | 40-yard dash | 10-yard split | 20-yard split | Bench press |
|---|---|---|---|---|---|---|---|
| 6 ft 2 1/8 in (1.88 m) | 245 lb (111 kg) | 33 in (0.84 m) | 10 1/2 in (0.27 m) | 4.82 s | 1.67 s | 2.81 s | 20 reps |
All values from NFL Combine

=== Jacksonville Jaguars ===
Clark was selected by the Jacksonville Jaguars in the seventh round of the 2000 NFL draft, with the 245th overall selection. He signed a four-year contract with the Jaguars. In four seasons with the Jaguars, Clark played in 61 games, starting 27, and saw action both at linebacker and on special teams. In 2001, played in 13 games with 3 starts and finished with 48 tackles, 1 pass defensed and 1 forced fumble along with 17 special teams tackles. In the 2002 NFL season, he started all 16 games for them and finished as the Jaguars’ 2nd-leading tackler with a career-high 152 tackles, 2 sacks, 1 interception, a pass defensed and a forced fumble. In 2003, his final season in Jacksonville, Clark played in all 16 games with 8 starts and finished with 73 tackles and 11 special teams tackles.

=== Oakland Raiders ===
In 2004, Clark signed a two-year contract by the Oakland Raiders on March 11, 2004, and became a full-time starter at linebacker with the Raiders. He started all 16 games in 2004, and led the Raiders in tackles with 129 tackles (98 solo), 2 sacks and 5 passes defensed. In 2005, he started 15 of 16 games for Oakland and led the Raiders in tackles for the 2nd consecutive season with 113 stops (82 solo), a sack and 7 passes defensed.

=== New Orleans Saints (first stint) ===
Clark signed a one-year contract with the New Orleans Saints on September 5, 2006, and played one season with the team. He appeared in all 16 games, starting none, and recorded 29 tackles—13 tackles (10 solo) and 13 tackles on special teams as Saints appeared in the NFC Championship game.

=== Houston Texans ===
Clark signed a one-year contract with the Houston Texans on March 7, 2007, and he went on to appear in 13 games including eight starts, and recorded 51 tackles and an interception and a forced fumble.

=== New York Giants ===
On March 13, 2008, Clark was signed by the New York Giants to a two-year contract. In 2008, he played in all 16 regular season games with 15 starts and started the NFC Divisional Playoff game vs. Philadelphia and finished 3rd on the team 74 tackles (36 solo), 6 tackles for losses, 1 pass defensed, 1 forced fumble and 2 special teams tackles.

=== New Orleans Saints (second stint) ===
Clark signed with the New Orleans Saints on September 6, 2010. He started 10 games and had 59 tackles during the season. He retired from the Saints on August 10, 2011.

== NFL career statistics ==
Legend
| **Bold** | Career high |

=== Regular season ===
| Year | Team | Games | | Tackles | | | | | Interceptions | | | | | Fumbles | | | |
| Year | Team | GP | GS | Cmb | Solo | Ast | Sck | TFL | Int | Yds | TD | Lng | PD | FF | FR | Yds | TD |
|---|---|---|---|---|---|---|---|---|---|---|---|---|---|---|---|---|---|
| 2000 | JAX | **16** | 0 | 22 | 21 | 1 | 0.0 | 0 | 0 | 0 | 0 | 0 | 0 | 1 | **2** | **44** | 0 |
| 2001 | JAX | 13 | 3 | 30 | 25 | 5 | 0.0 | 2 | 0 | 0 | 0 | 0 | 0 | **2** | 0 | 0 | 0 |
| 2002 | JAX | **16** | **16** | 92 | 70 | 22 | **2.0** | 6 | **1** | **7** | 0 | **7** | 2 | 0 | 0 | 0 | 0 |
| 2003 | JAX | **16** | 8 | 41 | 30 | 11 | 0.0 | 4 | 0 | 0 | 0 | 0 | 0 | 1 | 0 | 0 | 0 |
| 2004 | OAK | **16** | **16** | **130** | **99** | **31** | **2.0** | **10** | 0 | 0 | 0 | 0 | 5 | 1 | 0 | 0 | 0 |
| 2005 | OAK | **16** | 15 | 113 | 82 | **31** | 1.0 | 6 | 0 | 0 | 0 | 0 | **7** | 0 | 0 | 0 | 0 |
| 2006 | NOR | **16** | 0 | 29 | 23 | 6 | 0.0 | 4 | 0 | 0 | 0 | 0 | 0 | 0 | 0 | 0 | 0 |
| 2007 | HOU | 13 | 8 | 51 | 40 | 11 | 0.0 | 1 | **1** | 1 | 0 | 1 | 1 | 1 | 0 | 0 | 0 |
| 2008 | NYG | **16** | 15 | 69 | 43 | 26 | 0.0 | 6 | 0 | 0 | 0 | 0 | **1** | **2** | 0 | 0 | 0 |
| 2009 | NYG | **16** | 11 | 53 | 34 | 19 | **2.0** | 6 | 0 | 0 | 0 | 0 | 3 | 0 | 0 | 0 | 0 |
| 2010 | NOR | 14 | 10 | 59 | 47 | 12 | 0.0 | 4 | 0 | 0 | 0 | 0 | 1 | 1 | 0 | 0 | 0 |
| | | 168 | 102 | 689 | 514 | 175 | 7.0 | 49 | 2 | 8 | 0 | 7 | 20 | 9 | 2 | 44 | 0 |

=== Playoffs ===
| Year | Team | Games | | Tackles | | | | | Interceptions | | | | | Fumbles | | | |
| Year | Team | GP | GS | Cmb | Solo | Ast | Sck | TFL | Int | Yds | TD | Lng | PD | FF | FR | Yds | TD |
|---|---|---|---|---|---|---|---|---|---|---|---|---|---|---|---|---|---|
| 2006 | NOR | **2** | 0 | 4 | **4** | 0 | 0.0 | 0 | 0 | 0 | 0 | 0 | **1** | 0 | 0 | 0 | 0 |
| 2008 | NYG | 1 | 0 | **5** | 3 | **2** | 0.0 | 0 | 0 | 0 | 0 | 0 | 0 | 0 | 0 | 0 | 0 |
| | | 3 | 0 | 9 | 7 | 2 | 0.0 | 0 | 0 | 0 | 0 | 0 | 1 | 0 | 0 | 0 | 0 |
