= Kiwaukee Thomas =

American football player and coach (born 1977)

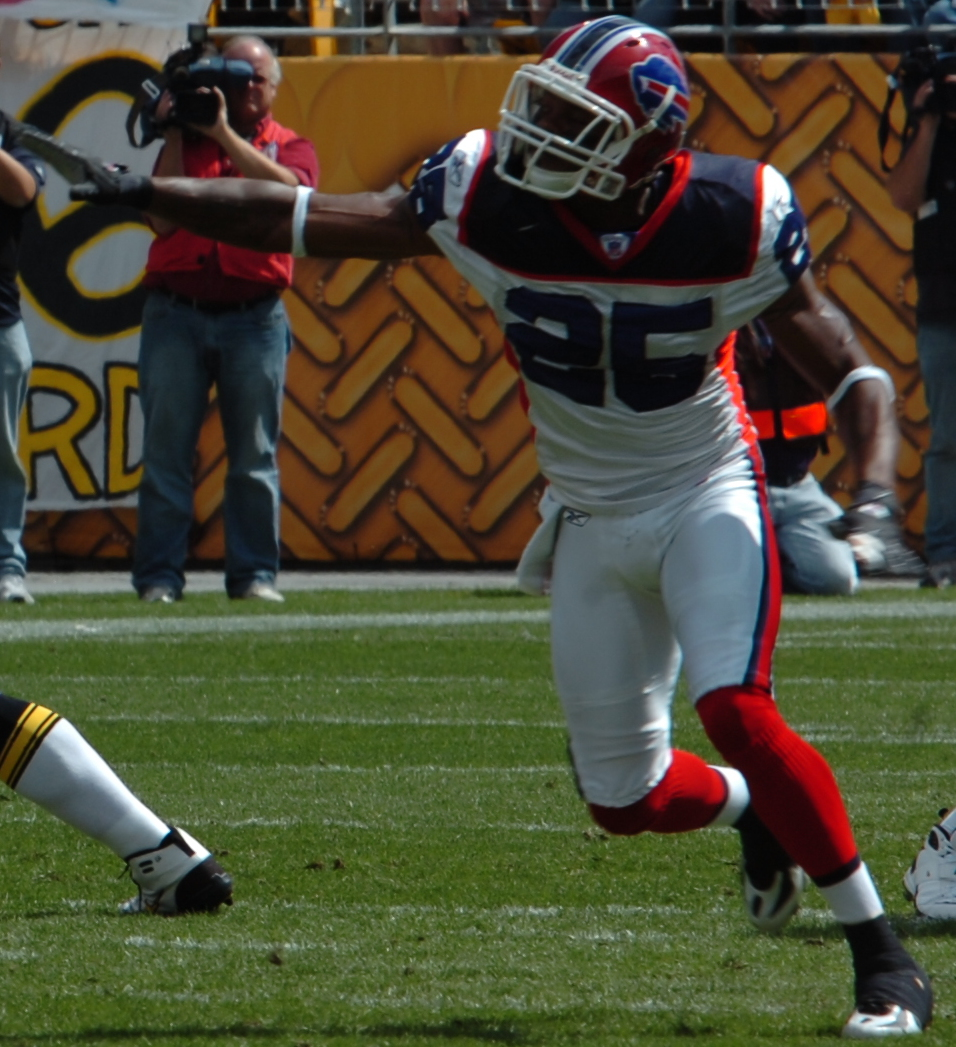
- Thomas with the Buffalo Bills in 2007

No. 41, 24, 20, 25
- Position: Cornerback

Personal information
- Born: June 19, 1977 (age 49); Warner Robins, Georgia, U.S.
- Listed height: 5 ft 11 in (1.80 m)
- Listed weight: 188 lb (85 kg)

Career information
- High school: Perry (Perry, Georgia)
- College: Georgia Southern (1996–1999)
- NFL draft: 2000: 5th round, 159th overall pick

Career history
- Jacksonville Jaguars (2000–2004); Miami Dolphins (2005); Buffalo Bills (2006–2007); Detroit Lions (2008)*; Montreal Alouettes (2008)
- * Offseason or practice squad member only

Awards and highlights
- First-team All-SoCon (1999)

Career NFL statistics
- Games played: 110
- Total tackles: 240
- Sacks: 4
- Fumble recoveries: 2
- Pass deflections: 24
- Interceptions: 1
- Stats at Pro Football Reference

Kiwaukee Sanchez Thomas [kee-WA-kee] (born June 19, 1977) is an American former professional football player who was a cornerback in the National Football League (NFL) and Canadian Football League (CFL). He played college football for the Georgia Southern Eagles and was selected by the Jacksonville Jaguars in the fifth round of the 2000 NFL draft.

Thomas was also a member of the Miami Dolphins, Buffalo Bills, Detroit Lions and Montreal Alouettes. He was also the head football coach at Middle Georgia State University.

== NFL career statistics ==
Legend
**Bold**	Career high

Year	Team	Games		Tackles					Interceptions					Fumbles			
Year	Team	GP	GS	Cmb	Solo	Ast	Sck	TFL	Int	Yds	TD	Lng	PD	FF	FR	Yds	TD
2000	JAX	16	3	33	31	2	0.0	0	0	0	0	0	4	0	**1**	0	0
2001	JAX	16	5	48	**46**	2	**3.0**	**5**	0	0	0	0	**5**	0	**1**	0	0
2002	JAX	16	0	34	31	3	0.0	0	0	0	0	0	**5**	0	0	0	0
2003	JAX	11	1	15	12	3	1.0	1	0	0	0	0	3	**1**	0	0	0
2004	JAX	16	2	17	14	3	0.0	2	0	0	0	0	0	0	0	0	0
2005	MIA	10	0	8	8	0	0.0	0	0	0	0	0	0	0	0	0	0
2006	BUF	16	3	**50**	39	11	0.0	1	0	0	0	0	**5**	0	0	0	0
2007	BUF	9	3	35	21	**14**	0.0	1	**1**	**8**	0	**8**	2	0	0	0	0
		110	17	240	202	38	4.0	10	1	8	0	8	24	1	2	0	0
