= Leon Searcy =

American football player and coach (born 1969)

No. 72
- Position: Offensive tackle

Personal information
- Born: December 21, 1969 (age 56); Washington, D.C., U.S.
- Listed height: 6 ft 4 in (1.93 m)
- Listed weight: 313 lb (142 kg)

Career information
- High school: Maynard Evans (Orlando, Florida)
- College: Miami (FL)
- NFL draft: 1992: 1st round, 11th overall pick

Career history

Playing
- Pittsburgh Steelers (1992–1995); Jacksonville Jaguars (1996–2000); Baltimore Ravens (2001); Miami Dolphins (2002)*
- * Offseason or practice squad member only

Coaching
- FIU (2004–2006) Offensive line coach

Awards and highlights
- Second-team All-Pro (1999); Pro Bowl (1999); 3× National champion (1987, 1989, 1991); First-team All-American (1991); University of Miami Sports Hall of Fame (2003)

Career NFL statistics
- Games played: 126
- Games started: 111
- Fumble recoveries: 3
- Stats at Pro Football Reference

Leon Searcy Jr. (born December 21, 1969) is an American football coach and former player. He currently works as a radio personality in Jacksonville, Florida.

Pre-draft measurables
Height	Weight	Arm length	Hand span	40-yard dash	10-yard split	20-yard split	20-yard shuttle	Vertical jump
6 ft 3 1/4 in (1.91 m)	296 lb (134 kg)	34 1/2 in (0.88 m)	9 1/2 in (0.24 m)	5.19 s	1.91 s	3.08 s	4.50 s	25.0 in (0.64 m)

Searcy is a former NFL offensive lineman who played primarily for the Pittsburgh Steelers and Jacksonville Jaguars in an 11-year career spanning from 1992 to 2002. He was drafted in the first-round and 11th overall by the Pittsburgh Steelers following his graduation from the University of Miami in the 1992 NFL draft. This was the first draft pick in the post-Chuck Noll era. Beginning in 1993 (his second year), Searcy was installed at the right tackle position. He stayed in this position until he left the team for the Jacksonville Jaguars as a free agent in 1996.

In the 2000 offseason, Searcy tore his right quadriceps muscle and spent the entire 2000 season on injured reserve. In 2001 Searcy signed a six year, $31.5 million contract with the Baltimore Ravens in 2001 where he would tear his left triceps tendon in preseason and miss his second straight full season due to injury. The Ravens would waive Searcy following the 2001 season and he'd be signed by Miami Dolphins during the 2002 offseason. Searcy once again dealt with injury concerns as he'd tear his right triceps while warming up for a preseason game against the Chicago Bears and was cut by the Dolphins prior to the regular season rather than being sent to the injured reserve for the third straight year in a row. He would never be signed to an NFL roster again after missing three straight seasons due to injuries following his lone All-Pro season in 1999.

From 2004 to 2006, Searcy was the offensive line coach at Florida International University in Miami, Florida.

Searcy was interviewed about his time at the University of Miami for the documentary The U, which premiered December 12, 2009 on ESPN.

Searcy also appeared in the episode "Broke," part of ESPN's 30 for 30 series of sports documentaries discussing the high percentage of professional athletes who suffer financial problems. He gave details on an incident in which a girlfriend stole $600,000 from him.

== Career highlights ==
- Member of 1987, 1989, and 1991 University of Miami National Championship teams.
- First-team All-America (Football Writers Association of America), 1991.
- Second-team All-America (The Sporting News, The Football News and Associated Press), 1991.
- Played in Super Bowl XXX for the Steelers.
- 2003 inductee of University of Miami Sports Hall of Fame.
