= Aaron Koch =

American football player (born 1978)

No. 64
- Position: Offensive guard

Personal information
- Born: February 21, 1978 (age 48); Portland, Oregon, U.S.

Career information
- College: Oregon State
- NFL draft: 2000: undrafted

Career history
- Tennessee Titans (2000)*; Jacksonville Jaguars (2000–2002)
- * Offseason or practice squad member only

Awards and highlights
- First-team All-Pac-10 (1999)
- Stats at Pro Football Reference

Aaron Paul Koch (born February 21, 1978) is a former National Football League (NFL) offensive guard for the Jacksonville Jaguars from 2000 to 2001. He played college football at Oregon State University and was initially signed as an undrafted free agent after the 2000 NFL draft by the Tennessee Titans. After being assigned to the Titan practice squad, he was then signed by the Jaguars later that season. He played in 24 games over two seasons.
