= Craig Miller (American football) =

American football player (born 1977)

No. 24, 21
- Position: Cornerback

Personal information
- Born: October 4, 1977 (age 49); Bakersfield, California, U.S.
- Listed height: 5 ft 11 in (1.80 m)
- Listed weight: 199 lb (90 kg)

Career information
- High school: Bakersfield
- College: Utah State
- NFL draft: 1999: undrafted

Career history
- Indianapolis Colts (1999–2000)*; Jacksonville Jaguars (2000); Barcelona Dragons (2001)
- * Offseason or practice squad member only

Career NFL statistics
- Games played: 4
- Games started: 2
- Pass deflections: 1
- Tackles: 2
- Stats at Pro Football Reference

Craig T. Miller (born October 4, 1977) is an American former professional football player who was a cornerback for one season with the Jacksonville Jaguars of the National Football League (NFL). He also played for the Barcelona Dragons in 2001. He played college football for the Utah State Aggies.
