= Erik Olson (American football) =

American football player (born 1977)

No. 45
- Position: Safety

Personal information
- Born: January 4, 1977 (age 49); Ventura, California, U.S.
- Listed height: 6 ft 1 in (1.85 m)
- Listed weight: 210 lb (95 kg)

Career information
- High school: Ventura
- College: Colorado State
- NFL draft: 2000: 7th round, 236th overall pick

Career history
- Jacksonville Jaguars (2000–2001)

Awards and highlights
- First-team All-Mountain West (1999)

Career NFL statistics
- Games: 14
- Tackles: 7
- Stats at Pro Football Reference

Erik James Olson (born January 4, 1977) is an American former professional football player who was a defensive back in the National Football League (NFL) who played for the Jacksonville Jaguars. He was selected in the seventh round of the 2000 NFL draft. He played college football for the Colorado State Rams.
