= Shadwick Criss =

American gridiron football player (born 1976)

No. 27
- Position: Defensive back

Personal information
- Born: January 11, 1976 (age 50); Sherman, Texas
- Listed height: 5 ft 11 in (1.80 m)
- Listed weight: 184 lb (83 kg)

Career information
- High school: Denison (TX)
- College: Missouri

Career history
- Calgary Stampeders (1999); San Diego Chargers (2000)*; Jacksonville Jaguars (2000); Dallas Cowboys (2002)*; Minnesota Vikings (2002)*; BC Lions (2003)
- * Offseason or practice squad member only
- Stats at Pro Football Reference

Shadwick Criss (born January 11, 1976) is an American former football defensive back. He played for the Calgary Stampeders in 1999, the Jacksonville Jaguars in 2000 and for the BC Lions in 2003.
