= Erik Storz =

American football player (born 1975)

No. 50
- Position: Linebacker

Personal information
- Born: June 24, 1975 (age 51); Rockaway, New Jersey, U.S.
- Listed height: 6 ft 2 in (1.88 m)
- Listed weight: 234 lb (106 kg)

Career information
- High school: Morris Catholic (Denville Township, New Jersey)
- College: Boston College
- NFL draft: 1998: undrafted

Career history
- Cincinnati Bengals (1998)*; Jacksonville Jaguars (1998–2000)
- * Offseason or practice squad member only

Career NFL statistics
- Tackles: 18
- Fumble recoveries: 1
- Passes defended: 1
- Stats at Pro Football Reference

Erik Storz (born June 24, 1975) is an American former professional football player who was a linebacker for the Jacksonville Jaguars of the National Football League (NFL) from 1998 to 2000. He played college football for the Boston College Eagles.
