= R. Jay Soward =

American gridiron football player (born 1978)

No. 81, 18, 3
- Position: Wide receiver

Personal information
- Born: January 16, 1978 (age 48); Rialto, California, U.S.
- Listed height: 5 ft 11 in (1.80 m)
- Listed weight: 184 lb (83 kg)

Career information
- High school: Fontana (CA)
- College: USC
- NFL draft: 2000: 1st round, 29th overall pick

Career history
- Jacksonville Jaguars (2000–2004) (Note: Soward was suspended by the NFL in January 2002, but it is unknown when or if he had been released from the reserve/suspended list by the team or reinstated by the league. His NFL.com profile indicates he was last on the Jaguars' roster for the 2004 NFL season.); Toronto Argonauts (2004–2006); Ontario Warriors (2012)

Awards and highlights
- Grey Cup champion (2004); 2× Second-team All-Pac-10 (1997, 1998)

Career NFL statistics
- Receptions: 14
- Receiving yards: 154
- Receiving touchdowns: 1
- Stats at Pro Football Reference
- Stats at CFL.ca (archive)

Rodney Jay Soward (born January 16, 1978) is an American former professional football player who was a wide receiver in the National Football League (NFL) and Canadian Football League (CFL). He played college football for the USC Trojans and was selected by the Jacksonville Jaguars in the first round of the 2000 NFL draft. Multiple suspensions derailed his career and he was indefinitely suspended by the NFL in 2002. He later played for the Toronto Argonauts of the Canadian Football League (CFL), with whom he won the Grey Cup.

== College career ==
Soward burst onto the college football scene with a 4-touchdown game against UCLA in his freshman season with USC.

== Professional career ==
Pre-draft measurables
Height	Weight	Arm length	Hand span	40-yard dash	10-yard split	20-yard split	Vertical jump	Broad jump
5 ft 9 1/2 in (1.77 m)	177 lb (80 kg)	31 3/4 in (0.81 m)	9 1/2 in (0.24 m)	4.34 s	1.46 s	2.52 s	35.0 in (0.89 m)	10 ft 4 in (3.15 m)
All values from NFL Combine

=== Jacksonville Jaguars ===
The Jacksonville Jaguars selected Soward with their first-round selection (29th overall) in the 2000 NFL draft. He did not take the pressure of being a first-round selection very well stating: "I think the hardest part for me was dealing with all the pressure after getting drafted. I didn’t play well my first year so people wore on me a lot. I wish I would have went [sic?] to New Orleans in the second round. I wish I hadn't ever been a first round draft pick. I felt that New Orleans had a better staff to suit me at that time. I think being with those guys would have changed my future in the NFL." He signed a five-year contract with the team for $5.5 million on July 14, 2000.

After wearing out his welcome with the Jaguars in training camp, before playing in his first game under head coach Tom Coughlin (who had gone so far as to send a limousine, at the team's expense, to pick up Soward every day for practice, just to make sure he would come), he was suspended several times by the NFL for violating the league's substance abuse policy.

He was ruled inactive for the team's first game in 2000, but played in the next 12 games. He was ruled inactive for the team's week 15 game against the Arizona Cardinals for violating a team rule. He returned to play in week 16, until he was placed on the team's non-football illness list on December 21, 2000, ending his season.

On June 9, 2001, he was suspended for the first four games of the 2001 season for violating the league's substance abuse policy. He was suspended an additional six games on October 11 for violating the policy a second time. On December 3, he was activated from the suspended list, but was inactive for the week 12 game. The Jaguars suspended him for one game on December 8 for violating team rules. He was suspended indefinitely by the team on December 11, but had to be reactivated for the season-finale against the Chicago Bears per league rules that state a team can only suspend a player for four games at a time. He was inactive for the game. He was suspended by the NFL for the entire 2002 season on January 10, 2002, for violating the league's substance abuse policy again. The Florida Times-Union reported that Soward remained on the Jaguars' roster through the 2002 season for salary cap purposes.

He did not file for reinstatement after his last suspension. Though many media outlets attributed the suspension to marijuana, his suspension came as a result of alcohol abuse. Soward recollected: "I can honestly say I was an alcoholic at that time in my life. That's why I'm not playing in the NFL, because I was an alcoholic at that time." After entering the NFL's substance abuse program, Soward was critical about its effectiveness, stating: "It was horrible counseling. I've been in every rehab centre known to man. They even had the nerve to put me in rehab in Miami, the drug capital of the world. I don't really think the rehabilitation process is very good for players down there. I think it is more of a disciplinary kind of rehabilitation which doesn't teach anybody anything. For me, the more they took away from me the more it made me want to drink, the more it made me want to feel depressed, the more it made me want to feel bad about me."

Soward ended his lone season in the NFL appearing in 13 games, and caught 14 passes for 154 yards with one touchdown. That touchdown came against the Washington Redskins, in which he beat Deion Sanders to the end zone. It was the second time in the game that Sowell had beaten Sanders, but he had dropped the ball. This fact was highlighted in the Jaguars media guide for the 2001 season.

=== Toronto Argonauts ===
On May 18, 2004, the Toronto Argonauts signed Soward to a contract while he was still under contract with the Jaguars. As an Argonaut, his primary role in the offense was as a fly route receiver that stretched the defense and whose long receptions usually translated into touchdowns. In his first year with the team—his first meaningful game action in four years—Soward went on to win a Grey Cup Championship.

In 2005, Soward and the Argonauts were unable to repeat as back-to-back champions, losing the Eastern Division Championship to the Montreal Alouettes. In that game, Soward was dubiously remembered for an overzealous touchdown celebration. After scoring a touchdown, he ran into a concession stand setup behind the end zone, grabbed a bag of popcorn, and shared it with a teammate and nearby fans. Though his touchdown helped to put his team up 14–0 after the first quarter, the Argos got outscored 33–3 for the next three quarters. That led many to believe that Soward's timing for his celebration stunt was not only premature, but a catalyst that fired up the Alouettes. He said: "It was a very spontaneous thing and I apologize to the people of Toronto if they feel I took away our opportunity, but I was just making an atmosphere where people can enjoy the game and see something different."

In 2006, when asked about the popcorn incident prior to a rematch against the Alouettes, Soward stated that he felt the criticism against him was unjust and that he would do it again if the opportunity presented itself. He told Los Angeles radio station KLAC that he got the popcorn idea from seeing Keyshawn Johnson do it after scoring a touchdown when he was playing football for West Los Angeles College. During the East Division semi-final that year, Soward caught the game-winning touchdown to help the Argonauts advance to the division finals which they went on to lose against the Alouettes in Montreal.

On December 15, 2006, Soward was released by the Argonauts. Since then he has been making a living in repairing televisions and working in a warehouse.

=== Ontario Warriors ===
For the 2012 season, Soward signed to play with the Ontario Warriors.
