= Emanuel Smith =

American football player (born 1976)

No. 89
- Position: Wide receiver

Personal information
- Born: February 3, 1976 (age 50); Jackson, Mississippi, U.S.
- Listed height: 6 ft 1 in (1.85 m)
- Listed weight: 210 lb (95 kg)

Career information
- High school: Clinton (Clinton, Mississippi)
- College: Arkansas (1995–1999)
- NFL draft: 2000: 6th round, 196th overall pick

Career history
- Jacksonville Jaguars (2000–2001)

Career NFL statistics
- Games played: 1
- Stats at Pro Football Reference

Emanuel Smith Jr. (born February 3, 1976) is an American former professional football wide receiver who played in the National Football League (NFL) for the Jacksonville Jaguars. He played college football for the Arkansas Razorbacks.

== Early life ==
Smith was born on February 3, 1976, in Jackson, Mississippi. He attended Clinton High School in Clinton, Mississippi.

== College career ==
Smith played college football for the Arkansas Razorbacks from 1995 to 1999. He redshirted his first year and was a four-year letterman from 1996 to 1999. Smith played in 43 games, recording 101 receptions for 1,235 yards and four touchdowns.

== Professional career ==
Smith was selected in the sixth round, with the 196th overall selection, by the Jacksonville Jaguars in the 2000 NFL draft. On August 27, 2000, he was waived by the team and signed to the practice squad the following day. On December 13, Smith was elevated to the active roster. On December 23, he played in his first and only game against the New York Giants. On August 17, 2001, Smith was placed on the injured reserve with a finger and toe injury. He missed the entire 2001 season and on March 1, 2002, he became an unrestricted free agent.
