= T. J. Slaughter =

American football player (born 1977)

No. 53, 57, 52
- Position: Linebacker

Personal information
- Born: February 20, 1977 (age 49); Birmingham, Alabama, U.S.
- Listed height: 6 ft 0 in (1.83 m)
- Listed weight: 233 lb (106 kg)

Career information
- High school: John Carroll Catholic (Birmingham)
- College: Southern Mississippi
- NFL draft: 2000: 3rd round, 92nd overall pick

Career history
- Jacksonville Jaguars (2000–2003); Green Bay Packers (2003); Baltimore Ravens (2003–2004); New Orleans Saints (2005); San Francisco 49ers (2006); New England Patriots (2008)*
- * Offseason or practice squad member only

Career NFL statistics
- Tackles: 252
- Sacks: 2
- Pass deflections: 8
- Interceptions: 1
- Forced fumbles: 4
- Fumble recoveries: 2
- Stats at Pro Football Reference

Tavaris Jermell Slaughter (born February 20, 1977) is an American former professional football player who was a linebacker in the National Football League (NFL). He was selected by the Jacksonville Jaguars in the third round of the 2000 NFL draft. He played college football at Southern Mississippi.

Pre-draft measurables
Height	Weight	Arm length	Hand span	40-yard dash	10-yard split	20-yard split	20-yard shuttle	Three-cone drill	Vertical jump	Broad jump	Bench press
6 ft 0 1/8 in (1.83 m)	247 lb (112 kg)	32 1/4 in (0.82 m)	10 in (0.25 m)	4.87 s	1.63 s	2.78 s	4.26 s	7.08 s	30.0 in (0.76 m)	9 ft 4 in (2.84 m)	24 reps
All values from NFL Combine

Slaughter was also a member of the Green Bay Packers, Baltimore Ravens, New Orleans Saints, San Francisco 49ers and New England Patriots.
