= Larry Smith (defensive tackle) =

American football player (born 1974)

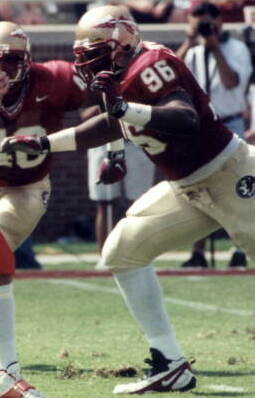
- Smith at Florida State in 1997

No. 94, 96
- Position: Defensive tackle

Personal information
- Born: December 4, 1974 (age 51); Kingsland, Georgia, U.S.
- Listed height: 6 ft 5 in (1.96 m)
- Listed weight: 310 lb (141 kg)

Career information
- High school: Charlton County (Folkston, Georgia)
- College: Florida State
- NFL draft: 1999: 2nd round, 56th overall pick

Career history
- Jacksonville Jaguars (1999–2002); Green Bay Packers (2003–2004)

Awards and highlights
- Second-team All-ACC (1998)

Career NFL statistics
- Tackles: 39
- Sacks: 5.5
- Games: 64
- Stats at Pro Football Reference

Larry Smith Jr. (born December 4, 1974) is an American former professional football player who was a defensive tackle in the National Football League (NFL). He played for the Jacksonville Jaguars and the Green Bay Packers during his career. He attended Charlton County High school where he played with teammate Champ Bailey. They were both drafted in the 1999 NFL draft.Though Larry Smith Jr. may not have reached Pro Bowl or Hall of Fame status, he carved out a solid six seasons in the NFL as a defensive tackle—a respectable career for any second-round draft pick. He’s also one of the most prominent professional athletes to hail from Kingsland and Camden County.
