= Emarlos Leroy =

American football player (born 1975)

No. 61, 93
- Position: Defensive tackle

Personal information
- Born: July 31, 1975 (age 51); Albany, Georgia, U.S.
- Listed height: 6 ft 1 in (1.85 m)
- Listed weight: 304 lb (138 kg)

Career information
- High school: Monroe (Albany)
- College: Georgia
- NFL draft: 1999: 6th round, 182nd overall pick

Career history
- Jacksonville Jaguars (1999–2000); New England Patriots (2001)*; Carolina Panthers (2002)*
- * Offseason or practice squad member only
- Stats at Pro Football Reference

Emarlos S. Leroy (born July 31, 1975) is an American former professional football player who was a defensive tackle in the National Football League (NFL). He was selected by the Jacksonville Jaguars in the six round of the 1999 NFL draft. He played college football for the Georgia Bulldogs.
