= Jim Tarle =

American football player (born 1972)

No. 5
- Position: Placekicker

Personal information
- Born: December 27, 1972 (age 53); Akron, Ohio, U.S.
- Listed height: 6 ft 0 in (1.83 m)
- Listed weight: 221 lb (100 kg)

Career information
- High school: Jacksonville (FL) Bishop Kenny
- College: South Carolina; Arkansas State
- NFL draft: 1996: undrafted

Career history
- Jacksonville Tomcats (2000); Jacksonville Jaguars (2000–2001); Frankfurt Galaxy (2001)
- Stats at Pro Football Reference

Jim Tarle (born December 27, 1972) is an American former professional football player who was a placekicker in the National Football League (NFL). He played college football for the South Carolina Gamecocks and Arkansas State Red Wolves. He played for the Jacksonville Tomcats of the Arena Football 2 league (AF2) in 2000, before signing with the NFL's Jacksonville Jaguars from 2000 to 2001.
