= Shyrone Stith =

American football player (born 1978)

No. 33, 30
- Position: Running back

Personal information
- Born: April 2, 1978 (age 48); Portsmouth, Virginia, U.S.

Career information
- College: Virginia Tech
- NFL draft: 2000: 7th round, 243rd overall pick

Career history
- Jacksonville Jaguars (2000); Indianapolis Colts (2001–2002)

Career NFL statistics
- Rushing yards: 55
- Average: 2.8
- Touchdowns: 1
- Stats at Pro Football Reference

Shyrone Stith (born April 2, 1978) is an American former professional football player who was a running back in the National Football League (NFL) for the Jacksonville Jaguars and Indianapolis Colts. He played college football for the Virginia Tech Hokies and was selected in the seventh round of the 2000 NFL draft. After Stith’s professional playing career he became a physical education teacher for Arlington public schools where he currently works.
