= Burnell =

Burnell is both a given name and a surname. Notable people with the surname include:

== Given name ==
- Burnell Dent (born 1963), American former football player
- Burnell Keith Herring, former member of German Eurodance band Magic Affair
- Burnell Poole (1884–1933), American painter and marine artist
- Burnell Taylor (born 1993), American singer
- Burnell Michael Wallace III, birth name of Mike Wallace (American football) (born 1986), American former footballer

== Surname ==
- Alf Burnell (1924–2019), English rugby league player
- Arthur Coke Burnell (1840–1882), British civil servant and translator
- Barker Burnell (1798–1843), U.S. Representative from Massachusetts
- Benjamin Burnell (1769–1828), British painter
- Broughton Benjamin Pegge Burnell (c. 1774–1850), British landowner
- Burnell family, Irish family
- Cassandra Burnell Southwick (c. 1600–1660), English-American Quaker immigrant
- Cerrie Burnell (born 1979), English actress, singer, playwright, children's author, and former television presenter
- Charles Burnell (1876–1969), British rower
- Charles S. Burnell (1874–1949), American judge
- Dana Burnell (born 1963), American drummer
- Enid Lyons (1897–1981; born Enid Muriel Burnell), Australian politician
- Fiona Burnell (born 1979), Canadian-American physicist
- Francis Burnell (1863–1926), American politician
- Frederick Spencer Burnell (1880–1958), Australian journalist and radio presenter
- Freda Burnell, Welsh murder victim
- Henry Burnell (disambiguation), several people
- Isaiah Burnell (1871–1951), British music teacher and composer
- Jack Burnell (born 1993), English retired swimmer
- Jason Burnell (born 1997), American basketball player
- Jocelyn Bell Burnell (born 1943), Northern Irish astrophysicist
- Joe Burnell (born 1980), English former footballer
- Joe Burnell (engineer), British engineer
- John Burnell (died 1490s), Irish judge
- Justin Burnell (born 1967), Welsh rugby union coach and former rugby footballer
- Keith Burnell (born 1979), American former footballer and Canadian footballer
- Mads Burnell (born 1994), Danish mixed martial artist
- Mary Burnell (1907–1996), Australian anaesthetist
- Matt Burnell (born 1978), Australian politician
- Mike Burnell, actor that starred in Deviant (2018 film)
- Patrick Burnell (died 1491), Irish judge and Crown official
- Paul Burnell (born 1965), Scottish former rugby union player
- Philip Burnell, English cricketer
- Ransom Burnell (1821–1880), American politician
- Richard Burnell (1917–1995), English rower
- Robert Burnell (c. 1239–1292), English bishop and Lord Chancellor of England
- Will Burnell (born 1984), English cricketer
- William Burnell (fl. 1292–1295), English dean

== Middle name ==
- Barry Watkins (1921–2004, born Randall Burnell Watkins), Welsh footballer
- Casey Bauman (born 2000), American footballer
- David Burnell Smith (1941–2014), American politician
- Eric Zentner (1981–2011), American fashion model
- Esther Burnell Mills (1889–1964), American pioneer and homesteader
- Gary B. Beikirch (1947–2021), United States Army soldier and Medal of Honor recipient
- Harold Burnell Carter (1910–2005), Australian scientist
- Les Jepsen (born 1967), American former basketball player
- Mary Clark-Glass (born 1944), academic, medical administrator and former politician from Northern Ireland
- Oswald Trellis (born 1935; second and third names Fitz Burnell), Guyanese dean
- Richard B. Beckett (1919–1983) Canadian politician
- Robert Burnell Skinner (1893–1969), Dominican and Trinidad and Tobagonian businessman, administrator and colonial governor
- Tanner Roark (born 1986), American former baseball player
- Thomas Claiborne (Virginia politician), American planter and politician
- Willie Hurst (born 1980), American former football player

== See also ==
- Brunel (disambiguation)
- Brunel (surname)
- Brunell
- Burnel
- Acton Burnell, village and civil parish in Shropshire, England
- Atqasuk Edward Burnell Sr. Memorial Airport, airport in Atqasuk, Alaska
- Bernie Babcock (1868–1962; born Julia Burnelle Smade Babcock), American writer
- Burnell-Nugent, compound surname
- Burnell Tavern, historic former tavern in West Baldwin, Maine
- Edmund Dunch (Roundhead), 1st Baron Burnell of East Wittenham (1602–1678), English politician and Member of Parliament
- Ernest Burnelle (1908–1968), Belgian politician
- Hincks and Burnell, English glass designing and manufacturing firm
- Holcombe Burnell, village and civil parish in Devon, England
- Vincent Burnelli (1895–1964), American aeronautics engineer
