= Brunel (surname) =

Brunel is a French surname. Notable people with the surname include:

== People ==
- Adrian Brunel (1892–1958), English film director and screenwriter
- Alfred-Arthur Brunel de Neuville (1852–1941), French painter
- Bunny Brunel (born 1950), French-born American bass guitarist
- Chantal Brunel (born 1948), French politician and mayor
- Francine Brunel-Reeves (1933–2018), Québécois singer, caller and researcher
- Gérard Brunel (born 1957), French hurdler
- Jacques Brunel (died 1564), 16th century French organist and composer
- Jacques Brunel (rugby player) (born 1954), French rugby union player and coach
- Jean-Luc Brunel (1946–2022), French model scout and agency manager
- June Brunel or Brunell, Australian actress, June Newton (1923–2021)
- Marc Isambard Brunel (1769–1849), engineer and father of Isambard Kingdom Brunel
  - Isambard Kingdom Brunel (1806–1859), famed British engineer
    - Henry Marc Brunel (1842–1903), engineer and the second son of Isambard Kingdom Brunel
- Olivier Brunel (born 16th century), Flemish merchant and explorer
- Philippe Brunel (born 1973), French footballer
- Todd Brunel, American clarinetist
- Valentin Brunel (born 1996), French DJ and musician better known as Kungs

== Fictional characters ==
- Colette Brunel, a character in Tales of Symphonia

== See also ==
- Brunel (disambiguation)
- Brunell
- Burnel
