= Brunell =

Brunell is a surname of French origin meaning "brown (haired / skinned) one" same as Burnell (metathesis). Notable people with the surname include:

- Angel Brunell (born 1945), former Uruguayan footballer
- Beatriz Stix-Brunell (born 1993), ballet dancer
- Caitlin Brunell (born 1992), won the Miss America's Outstanding Teen 2008 title in 2007
- Catherine Brunell (born 1975), Broadway actress from Shrewsbury, Massachusetts
- Johan Brunell, Finnish footballer
- Mark Brunell (born 1970), American football quarterback
- Mia Brunell Livfors (born 1965), Swedish businesswoman
- Ole Brunell or Shlomo Brunell, (born 1953), Lutheran minister who converted to Judaism
- Snyder Brunell (born 2007), American soccer player

== See also ==
- Brumel
- Brunaille
- Brunei
- Brunelle
- Brunelles
- Burnell
- Brunel (disambiguation)
- Bruneau (disambiguation)
