= Henry Villiers Parker, Viscount Boringdon =

British nobleman

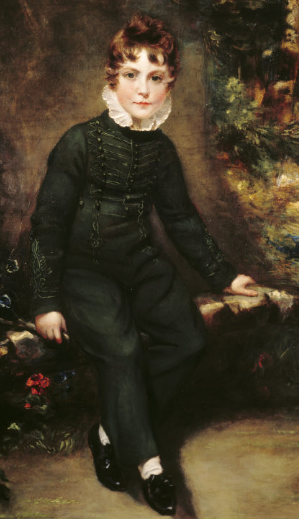
Henry Villiers Parker by Benjamin Burrell, 1813.

Henry Villiers Parker, Viscount Boringdon (28 May 1806 – 1 November 1817) was a British nobleman.

== Life ==
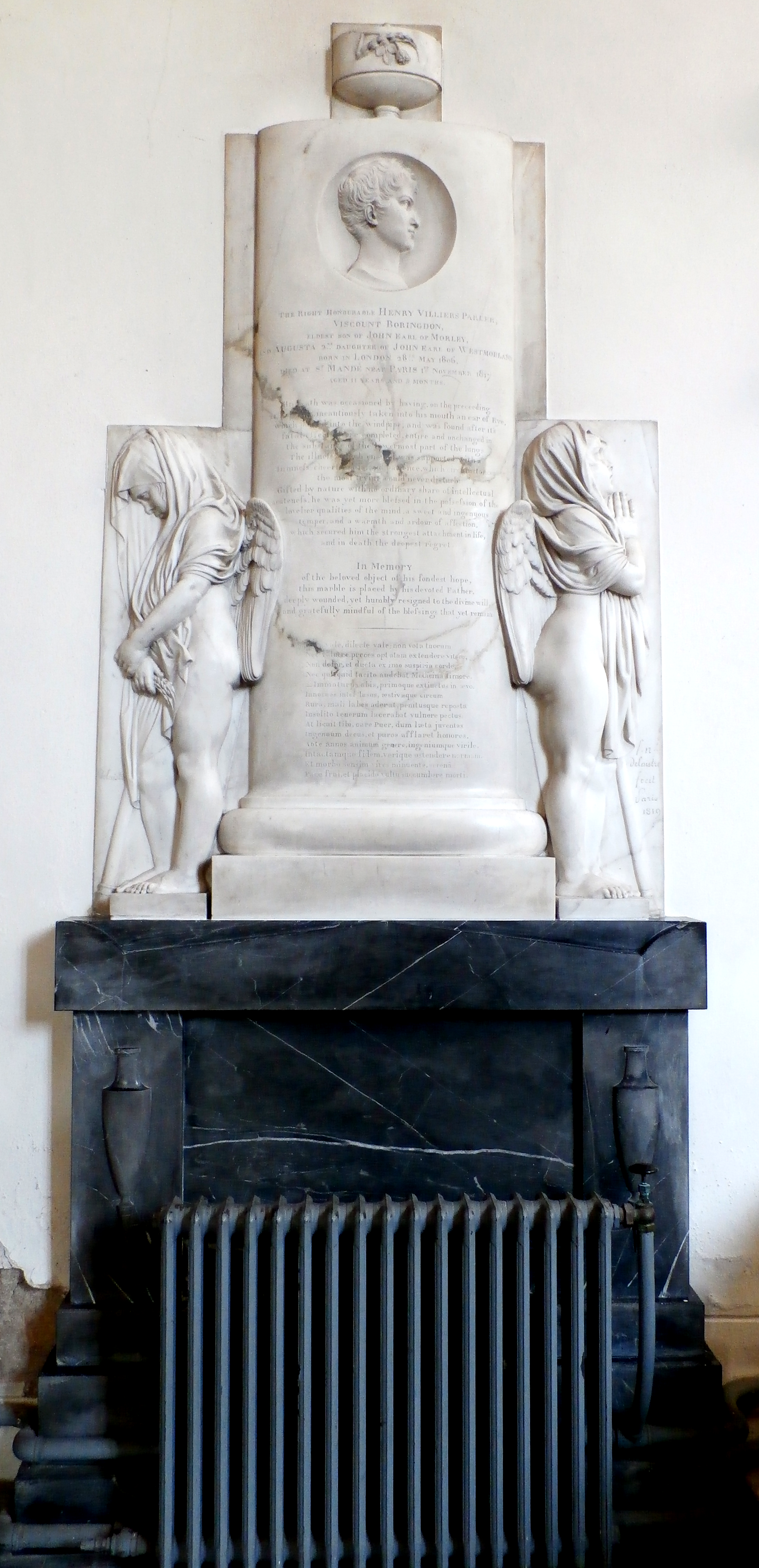
Monument by Delaistre to Henry Parker, Viscount Boringdon (1806-1817), St Mary's Church, Plympton

He was the son and heir apparent of John Parker, who had him painted by Benjamin Burnell in 1813. His mother was Lady Augusta Fane, second daughter of John Fane, 10th Earl of Westmorland, whom Parker had married in 1804 but from whom he was divorced by Act of Parliament in 1809 - she re-married to Sir Arthur Paget later in 1809.

In 1815, his father was created Earl of Morley and Henry assumed the courtesy title of Viscount Boringdon. However, Henry died at Saint-Mandé near Paris in 1817 aged 11, having "incautiously taken into his mouth an ear of rye" which having lodged in the "lowermost part of the lungs", caused his slow and painful death over several days, which he "supported with a firmness, cheerfulness and patience which circumstances the most trying could never disturb", as the monument by Delaistre erected to his memory by his father in 1819 in St Mary's Church, Plympton, relates. He was replaced as Viscount Boringdon and heir-apparent to the earldom of Morley by his half-brother Edmund Parker, who eventually succeeded to it in 1840.
