= Burnell-Nugent =

Burnell-Nugent is a compound surname formed from combining Burnell and Nugent, arising from the 1905 marriage of Frank Burnell-Nugent (né Nugent) and Ellen Burnell. Frank Burnell-Nugent was the son of Albert Llewellyn Nugent, 3rd Baron Nugent, whose father, Walter, had been created a Baron of Austria in 1859. Walter Nugent was a descendant of the Barons Delvin, later created Earls of Westmeath.

Notable people with the surname include:

- Frank Burnell-Nugent (1880–1942), British Army officer and an English cricketer
- James Burnell-Nugent (born 1949), British Commander-in-Chief Fleet of the Royal Navy
