= List of Jacksonville Jaguars team records =

This page details the team and NFL records for the Jacksonville Jaguars American football team.

== Team records ==
=== Wins and losses ===
- Most consecutive wins: 11, October 3, 1999 through December 19, 1999
- Most consecutive home wins: 13, September 29, 1996 through November 30, 1997
- Most consecutive road wins: 8, December 11, 2022 through November 26, 2023
- Most consecutive losses: 20, September 20, 2020 through October 10, 2021
- Most consecutive home losses: 10, September 24, 2020 through October 10, 2021
- Most consecutive road losses: 17, December 22, 2019 through January 9, 2022
- Most consecutive wins to start of season: 5, September 6, 1998 to October 12, 1998
- Most consecutive losses to start of season: 8, September 8, 2013 to October 27, 2013
- Most consecutive wins to end of season: 8, November 16, 2025 to January 4, 2026
- Most consecutive losses to end of season: 15, September 20, 2020 to January 3, 2021

=== Scoring ===
Most

- Most points scored in a season: 474 (2025)
- Most points scored in a regular season game at home: 51, vs. Indianapolis Colts, December 13, 2015
- Most points scored in a regular season game on road: 45, at Baltimore Ravens, November 1, 1998
- Most points scored in a postseason game: 62, vs. Miami Dolphins, January 15, 2000
- Most points scored in a first quarter at home: 21, vs. Philadelphia Eagles, October 12, 1997
- Most points scored in a first quarter on road: 17: (three times)
  - at New Orleans Saints, November 4, 2007
  - at Baltimore Ravens, September 10, 2000
  - at Tennessee Oilers, November 2, 1997
- Most points scored in a second quarter at home: 28, vs. Tampa Bay Buccaneers, December 11, 2011
- Most points scored in a second quarter on road: 28, at Baltimore Ravens, November 1, 1998
- Most points scored in a third quarter at home: 21: (five times)
  - vs. Seattle Seahawks, December 10, 2017
  - vs. Indianapolis Colts, December 13, 2015
  - vs. Oakland Raiders, December 12, 2010
  - vs. Cincinnati Bengals, November 11, 2001
  - vs. Cleveland Browns, December 3, 2000
- Most points scored in a third quarter on road: 17: (two times)
  - at Pittsburgh Steelers, November 19, 2000
  - at Cleveland Browns, December 4, 2005
- Most points scored in a fourth quarter at home: 21: (three times)
  - vs. Indianapolis Colts, December 13, 2015
  - vs. Houston Texans, October 14, 2007
  - vs. Indianapolis Colts, December 10, 1995
- Most points scored in a fourth quarter on road: 23, at Baltimore Ravens, November 28, 1999
- Most points scored in a first half at home: 31: (three times)
  - vs. Tennessee Titans, January 4, 2026
  - vs. New York Jets, December 14, 2025
  - vs. Houston Texans, December 17, 2017
- Most points scored in a first half on road: 42, at Baltimore Ravens, November 1, 1998
- Most points scored in a second half at home: 42, vs. Indianapolis Colts, December 13, 2015
- Most points scored in a second half on road: 28, at Houston Texans, December 24, 2005
- Most points scored in a first quarter postseason: 24, vs. Miami Dolphins, January 15, 2000
- Most points scored in a second quarter postseason: 17, vs. Miami Dolphins, January 15, 2000
- Most points scored in a third quarter postseason: 14, vs. Miami Dolphins, January 15, 2000
- Most points scored in a fourth quarter postseason: 17, at Pittsburgh Steelers, January 14, 2018
- Most points scored in a first half postseason: 41, vs. Miami Dolphins, January 15, 2000
- Most points scored in a second half postseason: 24, vs. Los Angeles Chargers, January 14, 2023
- Most points allowed in a season: 492 (2020)
- Most points allowed in a game at home: 47, Seattle Seahawks, November 12, 1995
- Most points allowed in a game on road: 52, at Detroit Lions, November 17, 2024
- Most points allowed in a postseason game: 42, at Denver Broncos, December 27, 1997; at Pittsburgh Steelers, January 14, 2018
- Most points allowed in first quarter at home: 17: (three times)
  - vs. Kansas City Chiefs, September 8, 2019
  - vs. Los Angeles Rams, October 15, 2017
  - vs. Minnesota Vikings, November 23, 2008
- Most points allowed in first quarter on road: 21, at Cincinnati Bengals, November 23, 1997
- Most points allowed in second quarter at home: 21: (four times)
  - vs. San Diego Chargers, November 29, 2015
  - vs. New York Giants, November 30, 2014
  - vs. Detroit Lions, November 4, 2012
  - vs. Indianapolis Colts, December 17, 2009
- Most points allowed in second quarter on road: 24: (two times)
  - at Tennessee Titans, October 27, 2016
  - at Denver Broncos, October 25, 1998
- Most points allowed in third quarter at home: 21, vs. Chicago Bears, December 27, 2020
- Most points allowed in third quarter on road: 28, at Tennessee Titans, November 24, 2019
- Most points allowed in fourth quarter at home: 28, vs. Chicago Bears, October 7, 2012
- Most points allowed in fourth quarter on road: 26, at Houston Texans, November 9, 2025
- Most points allowed in first half at home: 30, vs. Indianapolis Colts, September 21, 2014
- Most points allowed in first half on road: 34, at Buffalo Bills, September 23, 2024
- Most points allowed in second half at home: 38, vs. Chicago Bears, October 7, 2012
- Most points allowed in second half on road: 38, at Minnesota Vikings, December 20, 1998
- Most points allowed in first quarter postseason: 17, vs. Los Angeles Chargers, January 14, 2023
- Most points allowed in second quarter postseason: 14, at Pittsburgh Steelers, January 14, 2018
- Most points allowed in third quarter postseason: 16, vs. Tennessee Titans, January 23, 2000
- Most points allowed in fourth quarter postseason: 21, at Denver Broncos, December 27, 1997; at Pittsburgh Steelers, January 14, 2018
- Most points allowed in first half postseason: 27, vs. Los Angeles Chargers, January 14, 2023
- Most points allowed in second half postseason: 28, at Pittsburgh Steelers, January 14, 2018
- Most points in a game, both teams at home: 77, Jaguars (30) vs. Seattle Seahawks (47), November 12, 1995
- Most points in a game, both teams on road: 81, Jaguars (39) at Tennessee Titans (42), December 6, 2015
- Most points in a postseason game, both teams: 87, Jaguars (45) at Pittsburgh Steelers (42), January 14, 2018
- Most points in first quarter, both teams at home: 31, Jaguars (14) vs. Los Angeles Rams (17), October 15, 2017
- Most points in first quarter, both teams on road: 34, Jaguars (17) at New Orleans Saints (17), November 4, 2007
- Most points in second quarter, both teams at home: 37, Jaguars (27) vs. Buffalo Bills (10), October 25, 2015
- Most points in third quarter, both teams at home: 31, Jaguars (21) vs. Seattle Seahawks (10), December 10, 2017
- Most points in third quarter, both teams on road: 36, Jaguars (8) at Tennessee Titans (28), November 24, 2019
- Most points in fourth quarter, both teams at home: 41, Jaguars (17) vs. Indianapolis Colts (24), October 6, 2024
- Most points in fourth quarter, both teams on road: 41, Jaguars (20) at Tennessee Titans (21), December 6, 2015
- Most points in first half, both teams at home: 48, Jaguars (27) vs. Seattle Seahawks (21), November 12, 1995
- Most points in first half, both teams on road: 55, Jaguars (42) at Baltimore Ravens (13), November 1, 1998
- Most points in second half, both teams at home: 51, Jaguars (27) vs. Seattle Seahawks (24), December 10, 2017
- Most points in second half, both teams on road: 52, Jaguars (17) at Tennessee Titans (35), November 24, 2019
- Most points in first quarter postseason, both teams: 24, Jaguars (10) at Buffalo Bills (14), December 28, 1996; Jaguars (24) vs. Miami Dolphins (0), January 15, 2000
- Most points in second quarter postseason, both teams: 28, Jaguars (14) at Pittsburgh Steelers (14), January 14, 2018
- Most points in third quarter postseason, both teams: 21, Jaguars (7) at New York Jets (14), January 10, 1999
- Most points in fourth quarter postseason, both teams: 38, Jaguars (17) at Pittsburgh Steelers (21), January 14, 2018
- Most points in first half postseason, both teams: 48, Jaguars (41) vs. Miami Dolphins (7), January 15, 2000
- Most points in second half postseason, both teams: 45, Jaguars (17) at Pittsburgh Steelers (28), January 14, 2018
- Most consecutive games scoring: 199, from October 18, 2009 to December 5, 2021
- Most consecutive quarter scoring: 19, from October 3, 1999 in the 2nd quarter to November 7, 1999 in the 4th quarter; from December 2, 2007 in the 2nd quarter to December 30, 2007 in the 4th quarter
- Most consecutive quarter scoring by an opponent: 20, from December 5, 2021 in the 1st quarter to January 2, 2022 in the 4th quarter
- Most safeties scored in a game: 2, at Pittsburgh Steelers, October 3, 1999

Fewest

- Fewest points scored in a season: 243 (2011)
- Fewest points scored in a regular season game, 0: (four times)
  - at Tennessee Titans, December 12, 2021
  - at Seattle Seahawks, October 11, 2009
  - vs. Houston Texans, December 26, 2004
  - at Detroit Lions, December 17, 1995
- Fewest points scored in a postseason game: 3, at New England Patriots, January 7, 2006
- Fewest points allowed in a season: 217 (1999)
- Fewest points allowed in a game; 0: (nine times)
  - vs. Carolina Panthers, December 31, 2023
  - vs. Indianapolis Colts, September 18, 2022
  - vs. Indianapolis Colts, December 2, 2018
  - at Indianapolis Colts, October 22, 2017
  - vs. New York Jets, October 8, 2006
  - vs. Pittsburgh Steelers, September 18, 2006
  - vs. Houston Texans December 7, 2003
  - vs. Cleveland Browns, December 3, 2000
  - vs. Cincinnati Bengals, September 17, 2000
- Fewest points allowed in a postseason game: 3, vs. Buffalo Bills, January 7, 2018
- Fewest points in a game, both teams: 6, Jaguars (6) vs. Indianapolis Colts (0), December 2, 2018
- Fewest points in a postseason game, both teams: 13, Jaguars (10) vs. Buffalo Bills (3), January 7, 2018
- Fewest points in a first half postseason: 3, at New England Patriots, January 12, 1997; at New England Patriots, January 7, 2006; vs. Buffalo Bills, January 7, 2018
- Fewest points in a second half postseason: 0, vs. Tennessee Titans, January 23, 2000; at New England Patriots, January 7, 2006
- Fewest points allowed in a first half postseason: 0, vs. New England Patriots, January 3, 1999
- Fewest points allowed in a second half postseason: 0, vs. Miami Dolphins, January 15, 2000; vs. Buffalo Bills, January 7, 2018
- Fewest points in a first half, both teams: 0, Jaguars at Indianapolis Colts, September 18, 2005; Jaguars vs. Pittsburgh Steelers, September 18, 2006
- Fewest points in a second half, both teams: 0, Jaguars vs. Pittsburgh Steelers, September 9, 2001; Jaguars vs. Denver Broncos, September 19, 2004
- Fewest points in a first half postseason, both teams: 6, Jaguars (3) vs. Buffalo Bills (3), January 7, 2018
- Fewest points in a second half postseason, both teams: 7, Jaguars (7) vs. Buffalo Bills (0), January 7, 2018
- Longest scoreless streak by a Jaguars team: 115 minutes and 41 seconds: from December 5, 2021, 2nd quarter 13:23 left to December 19, 2021, 1st quarter 1:42 left
- Longest scoreless streak by opponents: 100 minutes and 3 seconds: from November 30, 2003, 2nd quarter 5:05 left to December 14, 2003, 1st quarter 10:02 left
- Longest scoreless streak by both teams: 50 minutes and 7 seconds: from September 19, 2004, end of 2nd quarter to September 26, 2004, 2nd quarter 9:53 left

=== Touchdowns ===
- Most touchdowns scored in a season: 55 (2025)
- Most touchdowns scored in a game: 7, vs. Indianapolis Colts, December 13, 2015; vs. Oakland Raiders, December 23, 2007
- Most touchdowns scored in one half: 6, at Baltimore Ravens, November 1, 1998 (1st half); vs. Indianapolis Colts, December 13, 2015 (2nd half)
- Most touchdowns scored in one quarter: 4: (three times)
  - at Baltimore Ravens, November 1, 1998 (2nd quarter)
  - vs. Tampa Bay Buccaneers, December 11, 2011 (2nd quarter)
  - vs. Buffalo Bills, October 25, 2015 (2nd quarter)
- Most touchdowns allowed in a season: 57 (2020)
- Most touchdowns allowed in a game: 7, at Detroit Lions, November 17, 2024; at New England Patriots, January 2, 2022
- Most touchdowns allowed in one half: 5: (three times)
  - at Minnesota Vikings, December 20, 1998 (2nd half)
  - vs. Chicago Bears, October 7, 2012 (2nd half)
  - at Buffalo Bills, September 23, 2024 (1st half)
- Most touchdowns allowed in one quarter: 4, vs. Chicago Bears, October 7, 2012 (2nd half); at Houston Texans, November 9, 2025 (4th quarter)
- Most touchdowns scored in a game by both teams: 12, Jaguars (6) at Tennessee Titans (6), December 6, 2015
- Most touchdowns scored in a postseason game by both teams: 12, Jaguars (6) at Pittsburgh Steelers (6), January 14, 2018
- Most touchdowns scored in one half by both teams: 8, Jaguars (6) at Baltimore Ravens (2), November 1, 1998 (1st half)
- Most touchdowns scored in one quarter by both teams: 6, Jaguars (3) at Tennessee Titans (3), December 6, 2015 (4th quarter)
- Fewest touchdowns scored in a game by both teams; 0: (five times)
  - Jaguars vs. Buffalo Bills, November 7, 2021
  - Jaguars vs. Indianapolis Colts, December 2, 2018
  - Jaguars vs. Tennessee Titans, September 23, 2018
  - Jaguars vs. Pittsburgh Steelers, September 18, 2006
  - Jaguars vs. Baltimore Ravens, November 14, 1999
- Most consecutive games scoring touchdown: 61, from November 21, 1999 to November 9, 2003
- Fastest touchdowns scored to start the game: 20 seconds, Fred Taylor, vs. Miami Dolphins, October 12, 1998
- Fastest touchdowns allowed to start the game: 13 seconds, Napoleon Harris, vs. Minnesota Vikings, November 23, 2008
- Fastest two touchdowns scored to start the game: 7 minutes and 45 seconds, vs. Tennessee Titans, January 1, 2006
- Fastest two touchdowns allowed to start the game: 1 minutes and 41 seconds, vs. Minnesota Vikings, November 23, 2008
- Fastest two touchdowns scored by both teams to start the game: 25 seconds, vs. Los Angeles Rams, October 15, 2017
- Fastest three touchdowns scored by both teams to start the game: 4 minutes and 6 seconds, at St. Louis Rams, October 30, 2005

=== Points after touchdown ===
- Most extra points scored in a season: 46 (2007)
- Most extra points scored in a game: 7, vs. Oakland Raiders, December 23, 2007
- Most extra points allowed in a season: 53 (2013)
- Most extra points allowed in a game: 7, at Detroit Lions, November 17, 2024
- Most extra points scored by both teams in a game: 10, Jaguars (4) at Houston Texans (6), December 30, 2007
- Most extra points scored by both teams in a postseason game: 12, Jaguars (6) at Pittsburgh Steelers (6), January 14, 2018
- Fewest extra points scored by both teams in a game; 0: (five times)
  - Jaguars vs. Buffalo Bills, November 7, 2021
  - Jaguars vs. Indianapolis Colts, December 2, 2018
  - Jaguars vs. Tennessee Titans, September 23, 2018
  - Jaguars vs. Pittsburgh Steelers, September 18, 2006
  - Jaguars vs. Baltimore Ravens, November 14, 1999
- Most two-point conversions scored in a season: 5 (1996)
- Most two-point conversions scored in a game; 2: (three times)
  - at Philadelphia Eagles, November 3, 2024
  - at Los Angeles Chargers, October 25, 2020
  - at Baltimore Ravens, November 28, 1999
- Most two-point conversions allowed in a season: 4 (2023)
- Most two-point conversions allowed in a game: 1, in 32 games
- Defensive two-point conversion allowed: Bobby Okereke, at Indianapolis Colts, November 17, 2019

=== Field goals ===
- Most field goals scored in a season: 33 (2019)
- Most field goals scored in a game: 5 (five times)
  - Last: at Buffalo Bills, October 10, 2010
- Most field goals allowed in a season: 38 (2016)
- Most field goals allowed in a game: 6, vs. Pittsburgh Steelers, December 1, 2002
- Most field goals scored by both teams in a game: 8, Jaguars (4) at Cincinnati Bengals (4), October 4, 2020
- Most field goals scored by both teams in one half: 6, Jaguars (3) vs. Minnesota Vikings (3), December 11, 2016 (1st half)
- Most field goals scored by both teams in one quarter: 4 (seven times)
  - Jaguars (1) at Baltimore Ravens (3), November 24, 1996 (2nd quarter)
  - Jaguars (1) at Minnesota Vikings (3), September 9, 2012 (4th quarter)
  - Jaguars (3) vs. Minnesota Vikings (1), December 11, 2016 (2nd quarter)
  - Jaguars (2) vs. Kansas City Chiefs (2), September 8, 2019 (2nd quarter)
  - Jaguars (2) at Cincinnati Bengals (2), October 4, 2020 (4th quarter)
  - Jaguars (1) at Detroit Lions (3), December 4, 2022 (2nd quarter)
  - Jaguars (2) at Indianapolis Colts (2), January 5, 2025 (2nd quarter)

=== Defensive/special teams touchdowns ===
- Most defensive touchdowns in a season: 7 (2017)
- Most defensive touchdowns in a game; 2: (five times)
  - at Pittsburgh Steelers, October 8, 2017
  - vs. Buffalo Bills, October 25, 2015
  - vs. New York Giants, November 30, 2014
  - vs. Tampa Bay Buccaneers, December 11, 2011
  - vs. San Francisco 49ers, September 12, 1999
- Most opponent defensive touchdowns in a season: 7 (2015)
- Most opponent defensive touchdowns in a game: 3, at Tennessee Titans, December 17, 2006
- Most special teams return touchdowns in a season: 2 (1999, 2021)
- Most special teams return touchdowns in a game: 1 (eighteen times)
  - Last: at Houston Texans, November 9, 2025

=== Point differential ===
- Largest margin of victory in a regular season game: 48, vs. Cleveland Browns, December 3, 2000
- Largest margin of victory in a postseason game: 55, vs. Miami Dolphins, January 15, 2000
- Largest comeback in a game: 21, vs. New York Giants, November 30, 2014
- Largest postseason comeback in a game: 27, vs. Los Angeles Chargers, January 14, 2023
- Largest margin of defeat in a regular season game: 46, at Detroit Lions, November 17, 2024
- Largest margin of defeat in a postseason game: 25, at New England Patriots, January 17, 2005; at Denver Broncos, December 27, 1997
- Largest blown lead in a game: 19, at Houston Texans, November 9, 2025
- Largest postseason blown lead in a game: 11, at New England Patriots, January 21, 2018

=== Drives ===
- Longest scoring drive (yards): 98, at Pittsburgh Steelers, October 8, 2017; at Cincinnati Bengals, October 31, 1999
- Longest scoring drive (plays): 20, at Pittsburgh Steelers, December 16, 2007
- Longest scoring drive (time): 12:18, at Indianapolis Colts, September 21, 2008
- Longest scoring drive allowed (yards): 99, at Dallas Cowboys, November 24, 2002; vs. Buffalo Bills, September 14, 2003; at Tennessee Titans, December 6, 2018
- Longest scoring drive allowed (plays): 20, vs. San Francisco 49ers, November 21, 2021
- Longest scoring drive allowed (time): 13:05, vs. San Francisco 49ers, November 21, 2021

=== Possession/first downs ===
Time of possession

- Highest time of possession: 44:22, at Tennessee Titans, December 17, 2006
- Highest opponent time of possession: 43:17, vs. Houston Texans, September 16, 2012
- Lowest time of possession: 16:43, vs. Houston Texans, September 16, 2012
- Lowest opponent time of possession: 15:38, at Tennessee Titans, December 17, 2006

First downs

- Most first downs in a season: 352 (2022)
- Most first downs in a game: 36, at St. Louis Rams, October 20, 1996
- Fewest first downs in a season: 251 (2011)
- Fewest first downs in a game: 6, at Houston Texans, December 30, 2018; vs. Houston Texans December 26, 2004
- Fewest first downs in one half: 0, vs. Green Bay Packers, September 24, 1995 (1st half)
- Most first downs allowed in a season: 394 (2020)
- Most first downs allowed in a game: 39, at Houston Texans, November 18, 2012
- Fewest first downs allowed in a season: 248 (1999)
- Fewest first downs allowed in a game: 2, vs. Cleveland Browns, December 3, 2000
- Fewest first downs allowed in one half: 0, vs. Cleveland Browns, December 3, 2000 (2nd half); vs Baltimore Ravens, October 24, 2011 (1st half)
- Most first downs, both teams, in a game: 58, Jacksonville (32) at San Francisco 49ers (26), December 24, 2017
- Fewest first downs, both teams, in a game: 22, Jaguars (9) vs. Baltimore Ravens (13), November 14, 1999
- Fewest first downs, both teams, in one half: 4, Jaguars (4) vs. Baltimore Ravens (0), October 24, 2011 (1st half)
- Fewest first downs, both teams, in one quarter: 2, Jaguars (2) vs. Baltimore Ravens (0), October 24, 2011 (1st and 2nd quarter)

=== First downs rushing ===
- Most first downs rushing in a season: 148 (2010)
- Most first downs rushing in a game: 16, at Tennessee Titans, December 5, 2010; vs. Indianapolis Colts, December 10, 2006
- Fewest first downs rushing in a season: 69 (2015)
- Fewest first downs rushing in a game: 0, vs. Indianapolis Colts, September 29, 2013

=== First downs passing ===
- Most first downs passing in a season: 215 (2015)
- Most first downs passing in a game: 24, at St. Louis Rams, October 20, 1996
- Fewest first downs passing in a season: 122 (2011)
- Fewest first downs passing in a game: 2, vs. Houston Texans, December 26, 2004

=== First downs by penalty ===
- Most first downs by penalty in a season: 39 (2016, 2023)
- Most first downs by penalty in a game: 7, vs. Houston Texans, December 5, 2013; at Buffalo Bills, December 2, 2012
- Fewest first downs by penalty in a season: 14 (2002)

=== Total net yards ===
- Most net yards gained in a season: 6,075 (2022)
- Most net yards gained in a game: 538, at St. Louis Rams, October 20, 1996
- Most net yards gained in one half: 342, at Indianapolis Colts, October 22, 2017 (1st half)
- Most net yards gained in one quarter: 219, at Indianapolis Colts, October 22, 2017 (2nd quarter)
- Fewest net yards gained in a season: 4,149 (2011)
- Fewest net yards gained in a game: 117, vs. Houston Texans, September 16, 2012
- Fewest net yards gained in one half: 18, vs. Green Bay Packers, September 24, 1995 (1st half)
- Fewest net yards gained in one quarter: -1, vs. Houston Texans, December 26, 2004 (1st quarter)
- Most net yards allowed in a season: 6,683 (2020)
- Most net yards allowed in a game: 653, at Houston Texans, November 18, 2012
- Most net yards allowed in a regulation game: 645, at Detroit Lions, November 17, 2024
- Most net yards allowed in one half: 399, at New Orleans Saints, November 4, 2007 (1st half)
- Most net yards allowed in one quarter: 246, at Tennessee Titans, October 27, 2016 (2nd quarter)
- Fewest net yards allowed in a season: 4,334 (1999)
- Fewest allowed yards gained in a game: 53, vs. Cleveland Browns, December 3, 2000
- Fewest allowed yards gained in one half: 13, at Tennessee Titans, December 17, 2006 (2nd half)
- Fewest allowed yards gained in one quarter: -10, vs. Carolina Panthers, December 31, 2023 (2nd quarter)
- Most net yards gained, both teams, in a season: 12,081 (2022)
- Most net yards gained, both teams, in a game: 1,111, Jaguars (458) at Houston Texans (653), November 18, 2012
- Most net yards gained, both teams, in a regulation game: 970, Jaguars (432) at New Orleans Saints (538), November 4, 2007
- Most net yards gained, both teams, in one half: 592, Jaguars (193) at New Orleans Saints (399), November 4, 2007 (1st half)
- Most net yards gained, both teams, in one quarter: 398, Jaguars (194) vs. Indianapolis Colts (204), October 6, 2024 (4th quarter)
- Fewest net yards gained, both teams, in a season: 9,157 (2011)
- Fewest net yards gained, both teams, in a game: 351, Jaguars (205) vs. Baltimore Ravens (146), October 24, 2011
- Fewest net yards gained, both teams, in one half: 101, Jaguars (85) vs. Baltimore Ravens (16), October 24, 2011 (1st half)
- Fewest net yards gained, both teams, in one quarter: 48, Jaguars (46) vs. Baltimore Ravens (2), October 24, 2011 (2nd quarter)

=== Passing ===
Passing yards

- Most net yards passing in a season: 4,126 (2023)
- Most net yards passing in a game: 420, at St. Louis Rams, October 20, 1996
- Fewest net yards passing in a season: 2,179 (2011)
- Fewest net yards passing in a game: 20, vs. Washington Redskins, December 16, 2018
- Most net yards passing allowed in a season: 4,291 (2015)
- Most net yards passing allowed in a game: 504, at Houston Texans, November 18, 2012
- Fewest net yards passing allowed in a season: 2,718 (2017)
- Fewest net yards passing allowed in a game: -9, vs. Cleveland Browns, December 3, 2000
- Most net yards passing, both teams, in a season: 8,399 (2015)
- Most net yards passing, both teams, in a game: 876, Jaguars (372) at Houston Texans (504), November 18, 2012
- Fewest net yards passing, both teams, in a season: 5,520 (2011)
- Fewest net yards passing, both teams, in a game: 125, Jaguars (45) vs. Houston Oilers (80), September 3, 1995
- Most gross yards passing in a season: 4,428 (2015)
- Most gross yards passing in a game: 432, at New England Patriots (OT), September 22, 1996
- Fewest gross yards passing in a season: 2,510 (2011)
- Fewest gross yards passing in a game: 54, vs. Houston Texans, December 26, 2004
- Most gross yards passing allowed in a season: 4,528 (2015)
- Most gross yards passing allowed in a game: 527, at Houston Texans, November 18, 2012
- Fewest gross yards passing allowed in a season: 3,074 (2017)
- Fewest gross yards passing allowed in a game: 33, vs. Cleveland Browns, December 3, 2000
- Most 300-yard passing games by an individual in a season: 6, Blake Bortles (2015); Mark Brunell (1996)

Passing attempts

- Most passing attempts in a season: 626 (2016)
- Most passing attempts in a game: 61, at Kansas City Chiefs, October 7, 2018
- Fewest passing attempts in a season: 446 (2006)
- Fewest passing attempts in a game: 13, at Tennessee Titans, October 13, 2002
- Most passing attempts allowed in a season: 617 (2023)
- Most passing attempts allowed in a game: 58, at Indianapolis Colts, October 16, 2022; vs. Houston Texans, December 5, 2013
- Fewest passing attempts allowed in a season: 458 (2000)
- Fewest passing attempts allowed in a game: 11, at Cleveland Browns, January 3, 2010

=== Completions ===
- Most pass completions in a season: 412 (2023)
- Most pass completions in a game: 37, at St. Louis Rams, October 20, 1996
- Fewest pass completions in a season: 240 (2011)
- Fewest pass completions in a game: 7, at Tampa Bay Buccaneers, October 28, 2007; at Tennessee Titans, October 13, 2002
- Most pass completions allowed in a season: 404 (2023)
- Most pass completions allowed in a game: 43, at Houston Texans, November 18, 2012
- Fewest pass completions allowed in a season: 258 (2000)
- Fewest pass completions allowed in a game, 7:
  - at Cleveland Browns, January 3, 2010
  - vs. Cleveland Browns, December 3, 2000
  - at Pittsburgh Steelers, November 17, 1996

=== Touchdown passes ===
- Most touchdown passes in a season: 35 (2015)
- Most touchdown passes in a game: 5, vs. New York Jets, December 14, 2025; at Tennessee Titans, December 6, 2015
- Most touchdown passes allowed in a season: 34 (2020)
- Most touchdown passes allowed in a game, 5:
  - at Seattle Seahawks, September 22, 2013
  - at Houston Texans, November 18, 2012
  - at Baltimore Ravens, September 10, 2000
  - at Tennessee Titans, December 26, 1999
- Most touchdown passes by both teams in a game: 9, Jaguars (4) at Houston Texans (5), November 18, 2012
- Most consecutive games with a passing touchdown: 17, December 18, 2014 vs. Tennessee Titans to December 27, 2015 at New Orleans Saints
- Most consecutive games allowing a passing touchdown: 16, September 13, 2020 vs. Indianapolis Colts to January 3, 2021 at Indianapolis Colts

=== Interceptions ===
- Most interceptions thrown in a season: 22 (2025)
- Most interceptions thrown in a game: 5, at St. Louis Rams, October 20, 1996
- Most interceptions thrown in one half: 4, at Tennessee Titans, December 12, 2021 (2nd half)
- Fewest interceptions thrown in a season: 6 (2005)
- Most interceptions thrown by opponents in a season: 21 (2017)
- Most interceptions thrown by an opponent in a game: 5, at Pittsburgh Steelers, October 8, 2017
- Most interceptions thrown by an opponent in one half: 4, at Pittsburgh Steelers, October 8, 2017 (2nd half)
- Fewest interceptions thrown by opponents in a season: 6 (2014)
- Most interceptions thrown by both teams in a game: 6, (five times)
  - Jaguars (4) at Kansas City Chiefs (2), October 7, 2018
  - Jaguars (1) at Pittsburgh Steelers (5), October 8, 2017
  - Jaguars (4) at New York Jets (2), September 18, 2011
  - Jaguars (4) at San Diego Chargers (2), September 19, 2010
  - Jaguars (5) at St. Louis Rams (1), October 20, 1996
- Most interceptions thrown by both teams in one half: 5, Jaguars (3) at San Diego Chargers (2), September 19, 2010 (1st half)
- Most interceptions thrown by both teams in one quarter: 4, Jaguars (2) vs. Baltimore Ravens (2), September 25, 2016 (4th quarter)

=== Times sacked ===
- Most times sacked in a season: 71 (2014)
- Most times sacked in a game: 10 (2014)
- Most sacks in a season: 57 (1999)
- Most sacks in a game: 10, at Indianapolis Colts, October 22, 2017; at Houston Texans, September 10, 2017
- Fewest times sacked in a season: 24 (2017, 2022)
- Fewest sacks in a season: 14 (2009)

=== Rushing ===
Rushing yards

- Most rushing yards in a season: 2,541 (2006)
- Most rushing yards in a game: 375, vs. Indianapolis Colts, December 10, 2006
- Fewest rushing yards in a season: 1,260 (2013)
- Fewest rushing yards in a game: 12, vs. Denver Broncos, October 2, 2005
- Most rushing yards allowed in a season: 2,452 (2020)
- Most rushing yards allowed in a game: 305, at Tennessee Titans, November 1, 2009
- Fewest rushing yards allowed in a season: 1,406 (2003)
- Fewest rushing yards allowed in a game: 10, at Kansas City Chiefs, October 7, 2007
- Most rushing yards by both teams in a season: 4,340 (2010)
- Most rushing yards by both teams in a game: 522, Jaguars (217) at Tennessee Titans (305), November 1, 2009
- Fewest rushing yards by both teams in a season: 3,182 (2015)
- Fewest rushing yards by both teams in a game: 46, Jaguars (32) vs. Arizona Cardinals (14), November 17, 2013
- Most 100-yard rushing games by an individual in a season: 9, Fred Taylor (2000)

=== Rushing attempts ===
- Most rushing attempts in a season: 527 (2017)
- Most rushing attempts in a game: 53, at Tennessee Titans, December 5, 2010
- Fewest rushing attempts in a season: 337 (2020)
- Fewest rushing attempts in a game: 9, at Indianapolis Colts, November 17, 2019
- Most rushing attempts allowed in a season: 545 (2012)
- Most rushing attempts allowed in a game: 50, at Philadelphia Eagles, October 2, 2022
- Fewest rushing attempts allowed in a season: 369 (2025)
- Fewest rushing attempts allowed in a game:10, at Kansas City Chiefs, October 7, 2007

=== Rushing average ===
- Highest rushing average in a season: 4.95 (2006)
- Highest rushing average in a game: 13.56, at Tennessee Titans, November 1, 2009
- Lowest rushing average in a season: 3.33 (2013)
- Lowest rushing average in a game: 1.09, vs. Denver Broncos, October 2, 2005
- Highest rushing average allowed in a season: 5.12 (2019)
- Highest rushing average allowed in a game: 10.56, at Carolina Panthers, October 6, 2019
- Lowest rushing average allowed in a season: 3.18 (2003)
- Lowest rushing average allowed in a game: 0.58, vs. Arizona Cardinals, November 17, 2013

=== Rushing touchdowns ===
- Most rushing touchdowns in a season: 23 (2006)
- Most rushing touchdowns allowed in a season: 23 (2019, 2020)
- Most rushing touchdowns in a game: 5, vs. Cleveland Browns, December 3, 2000; vs. Philadelphia Eagles, October 12, 1997
- Most rushing touchdowns allowed in a game: 4 (seven times)
  - Last: at Philadelphia Eagles, October 2, 2022
- Most rushing touchdowns by both teams in a game: 6 (four times)
  - Jaguars (2) at Tennessee Titans (4), November 24, 2019
  - Jaguars (3) at Kansas City Chiefs (3), December 31, 2006
  - Jaguars (4) vs. Indianapolis Colts (2), December 10, 2006
  - Jaguars (2) vs. Seattle Seahawks (4), November 12, 1995
- Most consecutive games with a rushing touchdown: 8 (two times)
  - November 12, 2006 vs. Houston Texans to December 31, 2006 at Kansas City Chiefs
  - November 21, 1999 vs. New Orleans Saints to September 3, 2000 at Cleveland Browns
- Most consecutive games with a rushing touchdown by an opponent: 10, December 20, 2015 vs. Atlanta Falcons to October 27, 2016 at Tennessee Titans

=== Receiving ===
Receptions

- Most receptions in a season: 412 (2023)
- Most receptions in a game: 37, at St. Louis Rams, October 20, 1996
- Fewest receptions in a season: 240 (2011)
- Fewest receptions in a game: 7, at Tampa Bay Buccaneers, October 28, 2007; at Tennessee Titans, October 13, 2002
- Most receptions allowed in a season: 404 (2023)
- Most receptions by an opponent in a game: 43, at Houston Texans, November 18, 2012
- Fewest receptions allowed in a season: 258 (2000)
- Fewest receptions allowed in a game; 7 (three times)
  - at Cleveland Browns, January 3, 2010
  - vs. Cleveland Browns, December 3, 2000
  - at Pittsburgh Steelers, November 17, 1996
- Most receiving touchdowns allowed in a season: 34 (2020)

=== Receiving yards ===
- Most receiving yards in a season: 4,428 (2015)
- Most receiving yards in a game: 432, at New England Patriots (OT), September 22, 1996
- Fewest receiving yards in a season: 2,510 (2011)
- Fewest receiving yards in a game: 54, vs. Houston Texans, December 26, 2004
- Most receiving yards allowed in a season: 4,528 (2015)
- Most receiving yards allowed in a game: 527, at Houston Texans, November 18, 2012
- Fewest receiving yards allowed in a season: 3,074 (2017)
- Fewest receiving yards allowed in a game: 33, vs. Cleveland Browns, December 3, 2000
- Most 100-yard receiving games by an individual in a season: 12, Jimmy Smith (1999, 2000)

=== Receiving touchdowns ===
- Most receiving touchdowns in a season: 35 (2015)
- Most receiving touchdowns in a game: 5, vs. New York Jets, December 14, 2025; at Tennessee Titans, December 6, 2015
- Most receiving touchdowns allowed in a season: 34 (2020)
- Most receiving touchdowns allowed in a game; 5 (four times)
  - at Seattle Seahawks, September 22, 2013
  - at Houston Texans, November 18, 2012
  - at Tennessee Titans, December 26, 1999
  - at Baltimore Ravens, September 10, 2000

=== Receiving average ===
- Highest receiving average in a season: 12.5 (1997, 2015)
- Highest receiving average in a game: 22.1, vs. Kansas City Chiefs, November 9, 1997
- Highest receiving average allowed in a season: 13.2 (2000)
- Highest receiving average allowed in a game: 20.4, vs. Tennessee Oilers, November 16, 1997

=== Punting ===
- Most punts in a season: 99 (2011)
- Most punts in a game: 11, vs. Kansas City Chiefs, September 8, 2013
- Fewest punts in a game: 0 (six times)
  - at St. Louis Rams, October 20, 1996
  - vs. Houston Texans, October 14, 2007
  - at Indianapolis Colts, December 2, 2007
  - at San Diego Chargers, September 19, 2010
  - at Buffalo Bills, October 10, 2010
  - vs. Los Angeles Chargers, November 16, 2025
- Most punts in a game by an opponent: 12, vs. Cleveland Browns, December 3, 2000
- Fewest punts in a game by an opponent: 0 (five times)
  - at New England Patriots, September 27, 2015
  - vs. Indianapolis Colts, September 13, 2020
  - at Baltimore Ravens, December 20, 2020
  - at Detroit Lions, December 4, 2022
  - at Detroit Lions, November 17, 2024
- Most punts by both teams in a game: 21, Jaguars (11) vs. Kansas City Chiefs (10), September 8, 2013
- Fewest punts by both teams in a game: 2 (five times)
  - Jaguars (1) at New York Jets (1), December 26, 2021
  - Jaguars (0) at San Diego Chargers (2), September 19, 2010
  - Jaguars (0) at Indianapolis Colts (2), December 2, 2007
  - Jaguars (0) vs. Houston Texans (2), October 14, 2007
  - Jaguars (1) vs. Chicago Bears (1), October 15, 1995
- Most punts by both teams in one half: 13, Jaguars (5) vs. Baltimore Ravens (8), October 24, 2011 (1st half)
- Most punts by both teams in one quarter: 7, Jaguars (3) vs. Baltimore Ravens (4), October 24, 2011 (2nd quarter)
- Fewest punts in a season: 54 (2007)
- Most punting yards in a season: 4,464 (2014)
- Highest punting average in a season: 49.3 (2022)
- Highest punting average in a game: 68.7, vs. Baltimore Ravens, November 27, 2022

=== Returns ===
Kickoff returns

- Most kickoff returns in a season: 80 (2010)
- Most kickoff returns in a game: 9, at Detroit Lions, December 17, 1995
- Most kickoff returns yards in a season: 1,903 (2010)
- Most kickoff returns yards in a game: 223, at Denver Broncos, October 25, 1998
- Most kickoff returns yards allowed in a season: 1,858 (1998)
- Most kickoff returns yards allowed in a game: 234, at Houston Texans, December 30, 2007
- Highest kickoff return average in a season: 25.9 (2013)
- Highest kickoff return average in a game (min. 4 returns): 40.5, at New Orleans Saints, November 4, 2007
- Most kickoff return touchdowns in a game: 1 (nine times)
  - Last: vs. Denver Broncos, September 19, 2021
- Most kickoff return touchdowns allowed in a game: 2, André Davis, at Houston Texans, December 30, 2007

=== Punt returns ===
- Most punt returns in a season: 53 (2005)
- Most punt returns in a game; 7 (five times)
  - vs. Los Angeles Chargers, November 12, 2017
  - vs. Washington Redskins, December 26, 2010
  - vs. San Francisco 49ers, December 18, 2005
  - vs. Baltimore Ravens, November 13, 2005
  - vs. Cleveland Browns, December 3, 2000
- Most punt return yards in a season: 581 (1998)
- Highest punt return average in a season: 12.9 (1998)
- Highest punt return average in a game (min. 3 returns): 44.7, vs. Kansas City Chiefs, September 13, 1998
- Most punt returns touchdowns allowed in a game: 2 (two times)
  - Eddie Drummond, vs. Detroit Lions, November 14, 2004
  - Darius Reynaud, at Tennessee Titans, December 30, 2012

=== Interceptions ===
- Most interceptions in a season: 21 (2017)
- Most interceptions in a game: 5, at Pittsburgh Steelers, October 8, 2017
- Most interceptions thrown in a season: 21 (2010, 2013)
- Most interceptions thrown in a game: 5, at St. Louis Rams, October 20, 1996
- Most interception return yards in a season: 330 (1999)
- Most interception return yards in a game: 110, vs. Tennessee Titans, November 5, 2006
- Most interceptions returned for a touchdown in a season: 3 (1999)
- Most interceptions returned for a touchdown in a game: 2, at Pittsburgh Steelers, October 8, 2017
- Most interceptions returned for a touchdown allowed in a season: 5 (2012)
- Most interceptions returned for a touchdown allowed in a game; 2 (five times)
  - vs. Miami Dolphins, October 26, 2014
  - at Tennessee Titans, December 30, 2012
  - at Chicago Bears, October 7, 2012
  - at Tennessee Titans, December 17, 2006
  - at Pittsburgh Steelers, November 22, 1998

=== Sacks ===
- Most sacks in a season: 57 (1999)
- Most sacks in a game: 10, at Indianapolis Colts, October 22, 2017; at Houston Texans, September 10, 2017
- Most sacks allowed in a season: 71 (2014)
- Most sacks allowed in a game: 10, at Washington Redskins, September 14, 2014
- Most sack yards in a season: 373 (1999)
- Most sack yards in a game: 64, at Indianapolis Colts, October 22, 2017
- Most sack yards allowed in a season: 450 (2014)
- Most sack yards allowed in a game: 71, at Denver Broncos, October 25, 1998

=== Penalties ===
- Most penalties in a season: 132 (2019)
- Most penalties in a game: 17, at New England Patriots (OT), September 22, 1996
- Fewest penalties in a season: 70 (2009)
- Fewest penalties in a game: 0, vs. Pittsburgh Steelers, December 1, 2002
- Most yards penalized in a season: 1,187 (2016)
- Most yards penalized in a game: 148, at New England Patriots (OT), September 22, 1996
- Fewest yards penalized in a season: 542 (2009)
- Fewest yards penalized in a game: 0, vs. Pittsburgh Steelers, December 1, 2002
- Most opponent penalties drawn in a season: 130 (2005)
- Most opponent penalties drawn in a game: 18, vs. Tennessee Titans, January 1, 2006

=== Other records ===
- Hottest game: 97 °F (36 °C), vs. New England Patriots, September 16, 2018
- Coldest game: 9 °F (-13 °C), at Cincinnati Bengals, December 17, 2000
- Successful onside kick recovery (eleven times):
  - vs. Chicago Bears, October 15, 1995
  - vs. Houston Oilers, September 8, 1996
  - vs. Indianapolis Colts, December 11, 2005
  - vs. Houston Texans, October 14, 2007
  - vs. Buffalo Bills, September 14, 2008
  - at Oakland Raiders, October 21, 2012
  - at Tennessee Titans, October 12, 2014
  - at Baltimore Ravens; December 14, 2014
  - at San Francisco 49ers, December 24, 2017
  - at Kansas City Chiefs, October 7, 2018
  - at Kansas City Chiefs, November 13, 2022
- Most 4th down conversions in a game: 4, at Buffalo Bills, September 23, 2024
- Most 4th down attempts in a game: 8, at Buffalo Bills, September 23, 2024

== Individual records ==
=== Service ===
- Seasons: 14, Brad Meester (2000–2013)
- Games played: 209, Brad Meester (2000–2013)
- Games started: 209, Brad Meester (2000–2013)
- Games played and games started in a postseason: 9, Jimmy Smith (1996–2005)
- Consecutive games played: 140, Tyler Shatley from November 8, 2015 to January 7, 2024
- Consecutive games started: 92, Brad Meester, from September 3, 2000 to December 4, 2005
- Consecutive games started by a quarterback: 72, Blake Bortles, from September 28, 2014 to November 25, 2018
- Games started by a quarterback: 117, Mark Brunell (1995–2003)
- Games started by a quarterback in a postseason: 8, Mark Brunell (1995–1999)
- Consecutive wins by a starting quarterback: 11, Mark Brunell, from October 3, 1999 to December 19, 1999
- Consecutive home wins by a starting quarterback: 11, Mark Brunell, from September 29, 1996 to December 7, 1997
- Consecutive road wins by a starting quarterback: 8, Mark Brunell, from November 29, 1998 to December 19, 1999; Trevor Lawrence, from December 11, 2022 to November 26, 2023
- Consecutive losses by a starting quarterback: 10, Blaine Gabbert, from September 30, 2012 to October 6, 2013; Chad Henne, from December 2, 2012 to October 27, 2013
- Consecutive home losses by a starting quarterback: 7, Blaine Gabbert, from September 16, 2012 to September 29, 2013
- Consecutive road losses by a starting quarterback: 10, Blake Bortles, from September 28, 2014 to November 8, 2015

=== Scoring ===
- Points: 1,022, Josh Scobee (2004–2014)
- Consecutive games scoring touchdown: 8, Maurice Jones-Drew, from November 12 to December 31, 2006; Fred Taylor, from September 20 to November 22, 1998
- Consecutive games scoring field goal: 15, Josh Scobee, from November 14, 2010 to October 24, 2011
- Consecutive games scoring: 67, Mike Hollis, from December 24, 1995 to September 10, 2000
- Field goals made: 235, Josh Scobee (2004–2014)
- Field goal attempts: 291, Josh Scobee (2004–2014)
- Field goal percentage (min. 25 attempts): 91.6, Josh Lambo (2017–2021)
- Extra points made: 317, Josh Scobee (2004–2014)
- Extra-point percentage (min. 25 attempts): 100.0, Brandon McManus (2023); Seth Marler (2003)
- Touchdowns: 81, Maurice Jones-Drew (2006–2013)
- Consecutive field goals made: 24, Josh Lambo, from December 2, 2018 to November 3, 2019, November 19, 2017 to November 11, 2018
- Longest field goal at home: 67 yards, Cam Little, vs. Tennessee Titans, January 4, 2026
- Longest field goal on road: 68 yards, Cam Little, at Las Vegas Raiders, November 2, 2025 (NFL Records)
- Longest postseason field goal: 54 yards, Josh Lambo, at New England Patriots, January 21, 2018
- Consecutive extra points made: 220, Mike Hollis, from October 22, 1995 to December 9, 2001
- Missed field goal returned for a touchdown: Jamal Agnew, vs. Arizona Cardinals, September 26, 2021
- Defensive two-point conversion: Aaron Colvin, at San Francisco 49ers, December 24, 2017
- Two-point conversions: 4, Keenan McCardell (1996–2001); Willie Jackson (1995–1997)
- Safety scored; 1 (nine times):
  - Josh Hines-Allen vs. Indianapolis Colts, December 7, 2025
  - Leon Jacobs at Tennessee Titans, December 6, 2018
  - Marcell Dareus vs. New York Jets, September 30, 2018
  - J. T. Thomas vs. Kansas City Chiefs, September 8, 2013
  - Daryl Smith vs. Chicago Bears, December 12, 2004
  - Greg Favors vs. Tennessee Titans, November 21, 2004
  - Rob Meier at Dallas Cowboys, November 24, 2002
  - Tony Brackens vs. Cincinnati Bengals, November 11, 2001
  - Joel Smeenge at Pittsburgh Steelers, October 3, 1999

=== Passing ===
- Yards: 25,698, Mark Brunell (1995–2003)
- Attempts: 3,616, Mark Brunell (1995–2003)
- Completions: 2,184, Mark Brunell (1995–2003)
- Consecutive pass completions: 17, David Garrard, November 14 to 21, 2010
- Completion percentage (min. 200 attempts): 62.9, Gardner Minshew (2019–2020)
- Longest pass completion: 90t, Blake Bortles, December 27, 2015 at New Orleans Saints
- Touchdown passes: 144, Mark Brunell (1995–2003)
- Longest passing touchdown: 90, Blake Bortles, December 27, 2015 at New Orleans Saints
- Interceptions thrown: 86, Mark Brunell (1995–2003)
- Interception percentage (min. 125 attempts): 1.4, Gardner Minshew (2019–2020)
- 300-yard passing games: 22, Mark Brunell (1995–2003)
- Consecutive 300-yard passing games: 3, Mark Brunell, from November 21, 1999 to December 2, 1999
- 400-yard passing games: 2, Mark Brunell (1995–2003)
- Consecutive games with a touchdown pass: 15, Blake Bortles, from September 13 to December 27, 2015
- Consecutive games without an interception: 8, David Garrard, from September 9 to November 25, 2007
- Consecutive passes with no interceptions: 209, David Garrard, from September 9 to November 25, 2007
- Passer rating (min. 200 attempts): 93.1, Gardner Minshew (2019–2020)

=== Rushing ===
- Yards: 11,271, Fred Taylor (1998–2008)
- Attempts: 2,428, Fred Taylor (1998–2008)
- Touchdowns: 68, Maurice Jones-Drew (2006–2013)
- Consecutive games with a rushing touchdown: 8, Maurice Jones-Drew, from November 12 to December 31, 2006
- Rushing average (min. 100 attempts): 6.32, Blake Bortles (2014–2018)
- Longest run from scrimmage in a regular season game: 90t, Leonard Fournette, at Pittsburgh Steelers, October 8, 2017
- Longest run from scrimmage in a postseason game: 90, Fred Taylor, vs. Miami Dolphins, January 15, 2000
- Longest rushing touchdown in a regular season game: 90, Leonard Fournette, at Pittsburgh Steelers, October 8, 2017
- Longest rushing touchdown in a postseason game: 90, Fred Taylor, vs. Miami Dolphins, January 15, 2000
- Longest run from scrimmage in a game no touchdown scored: 81, Leonard Fournette, at Denver Broncos, September 29, 2019
- Longest run from scrimmage in a game by a opponent: 99, Derrick Henry, at Tennessee Titans, December 6, 2018 (NFL Records)
- 200-yard rushing games: 1, Leonard Fournette (2017–2019); Fred Taylor (1998–2008)
- 100-yard rushing games: 48, Fred Taylor (1998–2008)
- Consecutive 100-yard games: 9, Fred Taylor, from October 16 to December 17, 2000

=== Receiving ===
- Receptions: 862, Jimmy Smith (1995–2005)
- Consecutive games with a reception: 86, Jimmy Smith, from October 29, 1995 to December 17, 2000
- Receiving yards: 12,287, Jimmy Smith (1995–2005)
- Receiving touchdowns: 67, Jimmy Smith (1995–2005)
- Consecutive games with a receiving touchdown: 7, Allen Hurns, from September 27 to November 15, 2015
- Yards per reception (min. 100 receptions): 14.25, Jimmy Smith (1995–2005)
- 200-yard receiving games: 2, Jimmy Smith (1995–2005)
- 100-yard receiving games: 46, Jimmy Smith (1995–2005)
- Consecutive 100-yard games; 3, Jimmy Smith, (seven times)
  - from October 24 to November 14, 2004
  - from December 19, 1999 to January 2, 2000
  - from November 21 to December 2, 1999
  - from September 12 to 26, 1999
  - from November 29 to December 13, 1998
  - from November 9 to 23, 1997
  - from August 31 to September 22, 1997
- Longest reception: 90t, Allen Robinson, at New Orleans Saints, December 27, 2015
- Longest receiving touchdown: 90, Allen Robinson, at New Orleans Saints, December 27, 2015

=== Yardage ===
- Scrimmage yards: 13,632, Fred Taylor (1998–2008)
- All-purpose yards: 13,640, Fred Taylor (1998–2008)

=== Punting ===
- Punts: 468, Logan Cooke (2018–present)
- Longest punt: 83, Bryan Barker, at New York Jets, October 11, 1999
- Punt yards: 22,188, Logan Cooke (2018–present)
- Punts inside the 20: 196, Logan Cooke (2018–present)
- Gross average (min. 100 punts): 47.4, Logan Cooke (2018–present)
- Net average (min. 100 punts): 43.5, Logan Cooke (2018–present)
- Fewest touchbacks (min. 100 punts): 17, Brad Nortman (2016–2017)

=== Returns ===
- Kickoff returns: 79, Maurice Jones-Drew (2006–2013)
- Kickoff return yards: 2,054, Maurice Jones-Drew (2006–2013)
- Kick return average (min. 50 returns): 26.00, Maurice Jones-Drew (2006–2013)
- Longest kickoff return: 102t, Jamal Agnew, vs. Denver Broncos, September 19, 2021
- Kick return touchdowns: 2, Maurice Jones-Drew (2006–2013)
- Punt returns: 146, Reggie Barlow (1996–2000)
- Punt return yards: 1,581, Reggie Barlow (1996–2000)
- Punt return average (min. 25 returns): 12.40, Bobby Shaw (2002)
- Longest punt return: 96t, Parker Washington, vs. New England Patriots, October 20, 2024
- Punt return touchdowns: 3, Parker Washington (2023–present)

=== Defense ===
- Interceptions: 30, Rashean Mathis (2003–2012)
- Longest interception return: 99, Devin Lloyd, vs. Kansas City Chiefs, October 6, 2025
- Interceptions returned for touchdown: 3, Telvin Smith (2014–2018); Rashean Mathis (2003–2012)
- Consecutive games with an interception: 3: (four times)
  - Devin Lloyd, from September 21 to October 6, 2025
  - Darious Williams, from October 1 to October 15, 2023
  - Brian Williams, from October 14 to November 11, 2007
  - Rashean Mathis, from January 1 to September 18, 2006
- Sacks: 60, Josh Hines-Allen (2019–present)
- Consecutive games with a sack: 8, Tony Brackens, November 11 to December 30, 2001
- Tackles: 1,089, Daryl Smith (2004–2012)
- Takeaways: 35, Rashean Mathis (2003–2012)

=== Fumbles ===
- Fumbles: 53, Mark Brunell (1995–2003)
- Fumbles lost: 25, Trevor Lawrence (2021–present)
- Forced fumbles: 27, Tony Brackens (1996–2003)
- Longest fumble recovery return: 90t, Aaron Beasley, vs. Cincinnati Bengals, November 8, 1998
- Fumble recovery touchdowns: 2, Aaron Beasley (1996–2001); Calais Campbell (2017–2019)
- Fumbles in a game: 4, Trevor Lawrence, at Philadelphia Eagles, October 2, 2022

=== Blocks ===
- Blocked kicks: 3, Clyde Simmons (1996–1997)
- Blocked kicks in a postseason: 1 (three times)
  - Clyde Simmons, vs Denver Broncos, January 4, 1997
  - Travis Davis, at Denver Broncos, December 27, 1997
  - Corey Chamblin, vs. Miami Dolphins, January 15, 2000
- Blocked field goals: 2, Marcus Stroud (2001–2007); Clyde Simmons (1996–1997)
- Blocked field goal returns: 1, Chris Hudson, vs. Pittsburgh, Sept. 22, 1997; Mickey Washington, vs. Cincinnati Bengals, December 1, 1996
- Blocked punts: 2, Donovin Darius (1998–2006); Dave Thomas (1995–1999)
- Blocked punt returns; 1 (five times)
  - Daniel Thomas, at Los Angeles Chargers, October 25, 2020
  - Mike Harris, at Tennessee Titans, December 30, 2012
  - Zach Potter, at Atlanta Falcons, December 15, 2011
  - Alvis Whitted, at Baltimore Ravens, November 1, 1998
  - Jimmy Smith, at Denver Broncos, December 3, 1995
- Blocked extra points; 1 (nine times):
  - Roy Robertson-Harris, at Buffalo Bills, September 23, 2024
  - Adam Gotsis, at New England Patriots, January 2, 2022; at New York Jets, December 26, 2021
  - Cody Davis, vs. Houston Texans, November 3, 2019
  - Telvin Smith, at Tennessee Titans, December 31, 2017
  - Jalen Myrick, at San Francisco 49ers, December 24, 2017
  - Sen'Derrick Marks, at Detroit Lions, November 20, 2016
  - Tony Brackens, vs. Cincinnati Bengals, October 5, 1997
  - Clyde Simmons, at New England Patriots, September 22, 1996
- Blocked extra points by an opponent: 1 (six times):
  - Nick McCloud, vs. New York Giants, October 23, 2022
  - Denico Autry, at Indianapolis Colts, November 11, 2018
  - Corey Liuget, vs. Los Angeles Chargers, November 12, 2017
  - Bernard Pollard, vs. Tennessee Titans, December 22, 2013
  - Matt Kalil, at Minnesota Vikings, September 9, 2012
  - Michael Boulware, vs. Houston Texans, October 14, 2007

== Single-game records ==
Scoring

- Points: 30, James Stewart vs. Philadelphia Eagles, October 12, 1997
- Points by an opponent: 24, Derrick Henry at Tennessee Titans, December 6, 2018
- Touchdowns: 5, James Stewart vs. Philadelphia Eagles, October 12, 1997
- Touchdowns in one half: 3 (three times)
  - James Stewart vs. Philadelphia Eagles, October 12, 1997 (1st half)
  - Maurice Jones-Drew at Detroit Lions, November 9, 2008 (1st half)
  - Allen Robinson at Tennessee Titans, December 6, 2015 (2nd half)
- Touchdowns in one quarter: 3, James Stewart vs. Philadelphia Eagles, October 12, 1997 (1st quarter); Maurice Jones-Drew at Detroit Lions, November 9, 2008 (2nd quarter)
- Touchdowns by an opponent: 4, Derrick Henry at Tennessee Titans, December 6, 2018
- Touchdowns in one half by an opponent: 3: (four times)
  - Eric Ebron, at Indianapolis Colts, November 11, 2018 (1st half)
  - LeGarrette Blount, at New England Patriots, September 27, 2015 (2nd half)
  - Knowshon Moreno, at Denver Broncos, October 13, 2013 (2nd half)
  - Mikel Leshoure, vs. Detroit Lions, November 4, 2011 (1st half)
- Touchdowns in one quarter by an opponent: 3, Mikel Leshoure, vs. Detroit Lions, November 4, 2011 (2nd quarter)
- Field goals: 5 (five times)
  - Josh Scobee, at Buffalo Bills, October 10, 2010; vs. Buffalo Bills November 25, 2007
  - Mike Hollis, at Baltimore Ravens, September 10, 2000; vs. Baltimore Ravens, November 30, 1997; vs. Cincinnati Bengals, December 1, 1996
- Field goals in one quarter; 3:
  - Josh Scobee, at Buffalo Bills, October 10, 2010 (4th quarter)
  - Jason Myers, vs. Minnesota Vikings, December 11, 2016 (2nd quarter)
  - Josh Lambo, vs. Pittsburgh Steelers, November 18, 2018 (2nd quarter)
  - Riley Patterson, at Los Angeles Chargers, September 25, 2022 (2nd quarter)
- Field goals 50 or longer made: 3, Josh Scobee, vs. Baltimore Ravens, October 24, 2011
- Extra points: 7, Josh Scobee vs. Oakland Raiders, December 23, 2007

=== Passing ===
- Attempts: 61, Blake Bortles vs. Kansas City Chiefs, October 7, 2018
- Completions: 37, Mark Brunell at St. Louis Rams, October 20, 1996
- Completion percentage (min. 20 attempts): 95, Gardner Minshew vs. Indianapolis Colts, September 13, 2020
- Yards: 432, Mark Brunell at New England Patriots, September 22, 1996
- Yards in one half: 315, Mark Brunell at New England Patriots, September 22, 1996 (2nd half)
- Yards in one quarter: 200, Blake Bortles vs. Kansas City Chiefs, October 7, 2018 (4th quarter)
- Touchdowns: 5, Trevor Lawrence vs. New York Jets, December 14, 2025; Blake Bortles at Tennessee Titans, December 6, 2015
- Touchdowns in one half: 4, Blake Bortles at Tennessee Titans, December 6, 2015 (2nd half)
- Touchdowns in one quarter: 3 (four times):
  - Mark Brunell vs. Indianapolis Colts, December 10, 1995 (4th quarter)
  - Mark Brunell vs. Pittsburgh Steelers, September 9, 2001 (2nd quarter)
  - Blake Bortles at Tennessee Titans, December 6, 2015 (4th quarter)
  - Blake Bortles vs. Houston Texans, December 17, 2017 (2nd quarter)
- Touchdowns by an opponent: 5: (four times)
  - Matthew Stafford, vs. Los Angeles Rams, October 19, 2025
  - Matt Schaub, at Houston Texans, November 18, 2012
  - Tony Banks, September 10, 2000
  - Steve McNair, at Tennessee Titans, December 26, 1999
- Touchdowns in one half by an opponent: 4: (two times)
  - Josh Allen, at Buffalo Bills, September 23, 2024 (1st half)
  - Tony Banks, at Baltimore Ravens, September 10, 2000 (2nd half)
- Touchdowns in one quarter by an opponent: 3, Philip Rivers, vs. San Diego Chargers, November 29, 2015 (2nd quarter)
- Combined touchdowns passing and rushing: 6, Trevor Lawrence vs. New York Jets, December 14, 2025
- Interceptions: 5, Mark Brunell at St. Louis Rams, October 20, 1996
- Average gain per attempt (min. 20 attempts): 12.7, Blake Bortles at Indianapolis Colts, October 22, 2017

=== Rushing ===
- Attempts: 37, Fred Taylor at New York Jets, September 25, 2005
- Yards: 234, Fred Taylor at Pittsburgh Steelers, November 19, 2000
- Yards in one half: 190, Leonard Fournette at Denver Broncos, September 29, 2019 (2nd half)
- Yards in one quarter: 147, Leonard Fournette at Denver Broncos, September 29, 2019 (3rd quarter)
- Touchdowns: 5, James Stewart vs. Philadelphia Eagles, October 12, 1997
- Touchdowns in one half: 3, James Stewart vs. Philadelphia Eagles, October 12, 1997 (1st half); Maurice Jones-Drew at Detroit Lions, November 9, 2008 (1st half)
- Touchdowns in one quarter: 3, James Stewart vs. Philadelphia Eagles, October 12, 1997 (1st quarter); Maurice Jones-Drew at Detroit Lions, November 9, 2008 (2nd quarter)
- Touchdowns by an opponent: 4, Derrick Henry at Tennessee Titans, December 6, 2018
- Touchdowns in one half by an opponent: 3: (three times)
  - LeGarrette Blount, at New England Patriots, September 27, 2015 (2nd half)
  - Knowshon Moreno, at Denver Broncos, October 13, 2013 (2nd half)
  - Mikel Leshoure, vs. Detroit Lions, November 4, 2011 (1st half)
- Touchdowns in one quarter by an opponent: 3, Mikel Leshoure, vs. Detroit Lions, November 4, 2011 (2nd quarter)
- Rushing average (min. 10 attempts): 11.07, Maurice Jones-Drew vs. Indianapolis Colts, December 10, 2006

=== Receiving ===
- Receptions: 16, Keenan McCardell at St. Louis Rams, October 20, 1996
- Yards: 291, Jimmy Smith at Baltimore Ravens, September 10, 2000
- Yards in one half: 194, Jimmy Smith at Baltimore Ravens, September 10, 2000 (1st half)
- Yards in one quarter: 134, Allen Robinson at New Orleans Saints, December 27, 2015 (3rd quarter)
- Touchdowns; 3:
  - Travis Etienne vs. New York Jets, December 14, 2025
  - Zay Jones vs. Dallas Cowboys, December 18, 2022
  - Marcedes Lewis vs. Baltimore Ravens, September 24, 2017
  - Allen Robinson at Tennessee Titans, December 6, 2015
  - Jimmy Smith at Baltimore Ravens, September 10, 2000
- Touchdowns in one half: 3, Allen Robinson at Tennessee Titans, December 6, 2015 (2nd half)
- Yards per reception (min. 4 receptions): 36.5, D. J. Chark vs. Kansas City Chiefs, September 8, 2019

=== Yardage ===
- Scrimmage yards: 291, Jimmy Smith at Baltimore Ravens, September 10, 2000
- All-purpose yards: 303, Maurice Jones-Drew vs. Indianapolis Colts, December 10, 2006

=== Punting ===
- Punts: 11, Bryan Anger vs. Kansas City Chiefs, September 8, 2013
- Punts inside 20 (since 2000): 6, Bryan Anger vs. Arizona Cardinals, November 17, 2013
- Gross average (min. 4 punts): 59.6, Logan Cooke vs. Green Bay Packers, October 27, 2024
- Net average (min. 4 punts): 52.2, Brad Nortman at Chicago Bears, October 16, 2016

=== Returns ===
- Kickoff returns: 7, Michael Walker at Tennessee Titans, November 24, 2019
- Kickoff return yards: 206, Reggie Barlow at Denver Broncos, October 25, 1998
- Kickoff return average (min. 3 returns): 47.3, Maurice Jones-Drew at New Orleans Saints, November 4, 2007
- Kick return touchdowns (nine times):
  - Jamal Agnew vs. Denver Broncos, September 20, 2021
  - Marqise Lee at Houston Texans, December 18, 2016
  - Maurice Jones-Drew at New Orleans Saints, November 4, 2007; vs. Indianapolis Colts, December 10, 2006
  - Derrick Wimbush at Arizona Cardinals, November 27, 2005
  - Elvis Joseph at Pittsburgh Steelers, November 18, 2001
  - Alvis Whitted at Tennessee Titans, December 26, 1999
  - Reggie Barlow vs. New England Patriots, December 7, 1997
  - Jimmy Smith at Denver Broncos, December 3, 1995
- Punt returns: 7, Jaydon Mickens vs. Los Angeles Chargers, November 12, 2017
- Punt return yards: 134, Reggie Barlow vs. Kansas City Chiefs, September 13, 1998
- Punt return average (min. 3 returns): 44.7, Reggie Barlow vs. Kansas City Chiefs, September 13, 1998
- Punt return touchdowns (eleven times):
  - Parker Washington at Houston Texans, November 9, 2025; at San Francisco 49ers, September 28, 2025; vs. New England Patriots, October 20, 2024
  - Keelan Cole vs. Green Bay Packers, November 15, 2020
  - Dede Westbrook vs. Washington Redskins, December 16, 2018
  - Jaydon Mickens vs. Cincinnati Bengals, November 5, 2017
  - Rashad Greene vs. Indianapolis Colts, December 13, 2015
  - Mike Thomas at Indianapolis Colts, December 19, 2010
  - Bobby Shaw vs. Philadelphia Eagles, October 6, 2002
  - Reggie Barlow vs. Kansas City Chiefs, September 13, 1998; vs. New Orleans Saints, November 21, 1999

=== Defense ===
- Tackles: 23, Hardy Nickerson vs. Baltimore Ravens, November 25, 2001
- Sacks: 4, Calais Campbell at Houston Texans, September 10, 2017
- Interceptions (2 in a game) (eighteen times):
  - Devin Lloyd at San Francisco 49ers, September 28, 2025
  - Rayshawn Jenkins vs. Dallas Cowboys, December 18, 2022
  - Tre Herndon vs. New York Jets, October 27, 2019
  - Jalen Ramsey vs. Pittsburgh Steelers, November 18, 2018
  - A. J. Bouye vs. Seattle Seahawks, December 10, 2017
  - Tashaun Gipson at Pittsburgh Steelers, October 8, 2017
  - Davon House at Baltimore Ravens, November 15, 2015
  - Derek Cox at Dallas Cowboys, October 31, 2010
  - Rashean Mathis vs. Tennessee Titans, November 5, 2006; vs. Pittsburgh Steelers, September 18, 2006; at St. Louis Rams, October 30, 2005; at Green Bay Packers, December 19, 2004
  - Terry Cousin vs. Baltimore Ravens, November 13, 2005
  - Donovin Darius at Oakland Raiders, January 2, 2005
  - Marlon McCree at Kansas City Chiefs, September 15, 2002
  - Rayna Stewart at Baltimore Ravens, September 10, 2000
  - Aaron Beasley vs. San Francisco 49ers, September 12, 1999
  - Deon Figures at Baltimore Ravens, August 31, 1997
- Interception in one half: (2 in one half) (seven times):
  - Tashaun Gipson at Pittsburgh Steelers, October 8, 2017 (2nd half)
  - Davon House at Baltimore Ravens, November 15, 2015 (2nd half)
  - Rashean Mathis vs. Tennessee Titans, November 5, 2006 (1st half); vs. Pittsburgh Steelers, September 18, 2006 (2nd half)
  - Terry Cousin vs. Baltimore Ravens, November 13, 2005 (2nd half)
  - Rashean Mathis at St. Louis Rams, October 30, 2005 (1st half)
  - Deon Figures at Baltimore Ravens, August 31, 1997 (2nd half)
- Interception in one quarter: (2 in one quarter) (three times):
  - Tashaun Gipson at Pittsburgh Steelers, October 8, 2017 (4th quarter)
  - Davon House at Baltimore Ravens, November 15, 2015 (3rd quarter)
  - Rashean Mathis, vs. Pittsburgh Steelers, September 18, 2006 (4th quarter)
- Interception by an opponent: 3, Samari Rolle, at Tennessee Titans, December 26, 1999
- Interception in one half by an opponent: 2: (thirteen times):
  - Martin Emerson, at Cleveland Browns, December 10, 2023 (1st half)
  - Kevin Byard, at Tennessee Titans, December 31, 2017 (2nd half)
  - Tre Boston, vs. Los Angeles Chargers, November 12, 2017 (2nd half)
  - Casey Hayward, at San Diego Chargers, September 18, 2016 (1st half)
  - Tashaun Gipson, vs. Cleveland Browns, October 19, 2014 (1st half)
  - Patrick Chung, vs. New England Patriots, December 23, 2012 (2nd half)
  - Darius Butler, vs. Indianapolis Colts, November 8, 2011 (2nd half)
  - T. J. Ward, vs. Cleveland Browns, November 21, 2010 (2nd half)
  - Antoine Cason, at San Diego Chargers, September 19, 2010 (1st half)
  - Cortland Finnegan, at Tennessee Titans, September 7, 2008 (2nd half)
  - Tyrone Poole, at New England Patriots, December 14, 2003 (2nd half)
  - Samari Rolle, at Tennessee Titans, December 26, 1999 (2nd half)
  - Anthony Parker, at St. Louis Rams, October 20, 1996 (1st half)
- Interception in one quarter by an opponent: 2: (five times):
  - Martin Emerson, at Cleveland Browns, December 10, 2023 (2nd quarter)
  - Kevin Byard, at Tennessee Titans, December 31, 2017 (4th quarter)
  - Tre Boston, vs. Los Angeles Chargers, November 12, 2017 (4th quarter)
  - Patrick Chung, vs. New England Patriots, December 23, 2012 (4th quarter)
  - Tyrone Poole, at New England Patriots, December 14, 2003 (4th quarter)
- Interceptions returned for touchdown (1 in a game) (twenty-seven times):
  - Antonio Johnson, vs. Tennessee Titans, January 4, 2026
  - Devin Lloyd vs. Kansas City Chiefs, October 6, 2025
  - Foyesade Oluokun at New Orleans Saints, October 19, 2023
  - Darious Williams vs. Atlanta Falcons, October 1, 2023
  - Rayshawn Jenkins vs. Dallas Cowboys, December 18, 2022
  - Andre Cisco at Philadelphia Eagles, October 2, 2022
  - Joe Schobert at Minnesota Vikings, December 6, 2020
  - Yannick Ngakoue at Cincinnati Bengals, October 20, 2019
  - Telvin Smith at Miami Dolphins, December 23, 2018; at Pittsburgh Steelers, October 8, 2017; vs. Buffalo Bills, October 25, 2015
  - Myles Jack at New York Giants, September 9, 2018
  - Barry Church at Pittsburgh Steelers, October 8, 2017
  - Jalen Ramsey vs. Tennessee Titans, December 24, 2016
  - Dwayne Gratz at Houston Texans, December 28, 2014
  - Paul Posluszny at Denver Broncos, October 13, 2013
  - Rashean Mathis vs. Pittsburgh Steelers, October 5, 2008; at Indianapolis Colts, September 21, 2008; at Pittsburgh Steelers, October 16, 2005
  - Clint Ingram vs. Carolina Panthers, December 9, 2007
  - Aaron Glenn at Tampa Bay Buccaneers, October 28, 2007
  - Scott Starks vs. Tennessee Titans, November 5, 2006
  - Mike Peterson vs. Baltimore Ravens, November 13, 2005
  - Tony Brackens at Baltimore Ravens, November 28, 1999
  - Aaron Beasley vs. Tennessee Titans, September 26, 1999; vs. San Francisco 49ers, September 12, 1999
  - Mickey Washington at Cleveland Browns, October 22, 1995
- Opponent fumbles recovered:
  - Telvin Smith at Indianapolis Colts, November 23, 2014
  - Donovin Darius at Buffalo Bills, September 12, 2004
  - Tony Brackens vs. Carolina Panthers, September 29, 1996
- Forced fumbles: 3, Tony Brackens vs. Pittsburgh Steelers, October 3, 1999
- Blocked field goals: 1, (twelve times):
  - Calais Campbell at Carolina Panthers, October 6, 2019
  - Tyson Alualu at New Orleans Saints, December 27, 2015
  - Chris Clemons vs. Carolina Panthers, September 13, 2015
  - Gerald Sensabaugh at Detroit Lions, November 9, 2008
  - Rashean Mathis vs. Denver Broncos, October 2, 2005
  - Akin Ayodele vs. Houston Texans, December 26, 2004
  - Marcus Stroud vs. Indianapolis Colts, September 8, 2002; vs. Green Bay Packers, December 3, 2001
  - Clyde Simmons, vs. Pittsburgh Steelers, September 22, 1997; vs. Cincinnati Bengals, December 1, 1996
  - Don Davey vs. Atlanta Falcons, December 22, 1996
- Blocked punts: 1, (fourteen times):
  - Daniel Thomas vs. Los Angeles Chargers, October 25, 2020
  - Dan Skuta at Indianapolis Colts, January 1, 2017
  - Hayes Pullard vs. San Diego Chargers, November 29, 2015
  - J. T. Thomas vs. Kansas City Chiefs, September 8, 2013
  - Mike Harris at Tennessee Titans, December 30, 2012
  - Kassim Osgood at Atlanta Falcons, December 15, 2011
  - Rashad Jennings at San Diego Chargers, September 19, 2010
  - Jorge Cordova vs. Indianapolis Colts, December 10, 2006
  - Gerald Sensabaugh vs. New York Jets, October 8, 2006
  - Derrick Wimbush vs. Cincinnati Bengals, October 9, 2005
  - Eric Westmoreland vs. Houston Texans, October 27, 2002
  - Donovin Darius vs. Pittsburgh Steelers, September 10, 2001; vs. Pittsburgh Steelers, October 1, 2000
  - Dave Thomas vs. Baltimore Ravens, November 14, 1999; Philadelphia Eagles, October 12, 1999
  - Alvis Whitted at Baltimore Ravens, November 1, 1998
  - Mike Dumas at Denver Broncos, December 3, 1995

== Single-season records ==
=== Scoring ===
- Points: 140, Cam Little (2025)
- Most total touchdowns: 38, Trevor Lawrence (2025)
- Touchdowns: 17, Fred Taylor (1998)
- Field goals: 33, Josh Lambo (2019)
- Field goal percentage: 97.1%, Josh Lambo (2019)
- Extra points: 45, Mike Hollis (1998)

=== Passing ===
- Completions: 387, Trevor Lawrence (2022)
- Attempts: 625, Blake Bortles (2016)
- Completion percentage (min. 300 attempts): 66.3%, Trevor Lawrence (2022)
- Yards: 4,428, Blake Bortles (2015)
- Average gain per attempt (min. 300 attempts): 7.8, Mark Brunell (1996)
- Touchdowns: 35, Blake Bortles (2015)
- Interceptions: 20, Mark Brunell (1996)
- Interception percentage: 0.9, David Garrard (2007)
- 400-yard passing games: 2, Mark Brunell (1996)
- 300-yard passing games: 6, Blake Bortles (2015); Mark Brunell (1996)
- Rating (min. 300 attempts): 102.2, David Garrard (2007)
- Least interceptions (min. 200 attempts): 3, David Garrard (2007)

=== Rushing ===
- Attempts: 345, Fred Taylor (2003)
- Yards: 1,606, Maurice Jones-Drew (2011)
- Touchdowns: 15, Maurice Jones-Drew (2009)
- Rushing average (min. 150 attempts): 5.67, Maurice Jones-Drew (2006)
- 200-yard rushing games: 1, Leonard Fournette (2019); Fred Taylor (2000)
- 100-yard rushing games: 9, Fred Taylor (2000)

=== Receiving ===
- Receptions: 116, Jimmy Smith (1999)
- Receiving yards: 1,636, Jimmy Smith (1999)
- Receiving touchdowns: 14, Allen Robinson (2015)
- Yards per reception (min. 50 receptions): 17.8, Cecil Shorts III (2012)
- 200-yard receiving games:
  - Justin Blackmon (2012)
  - Jimmy Smith (1999 & 2000)
  - Keenan McCardell (1996)
- 100-yard receiving games: 9, Jimmy Smith (1999)

=== Yardage ===
- Scrimmage yards: 1,980, Maurice Jones-Drew (2011)
- All-purpose yards: 2,250, Maurice Jones-Drew (2006)

=== Punting ===
- Punts: 95, Bryan Anger (2013)
- Gross average (min. 50 punts): 49.3, Logan Cooke (2022)
- Net average (min. 50 punts): 44.5, Logan Cooke (2019)
- Inside the 20: 37, Logan Cooke (2018)
- Touchbacks (min. 50 punts): 1, Logan Cooke (2021)

=== Returns ===
- Kickoff returns: 52, Brian Witherspoon (2008)
- Kickoff return yards: 1,250, Brian Witherspoon (2008)
- Kickoff return average (min. 15 returns): 30.3, Marqise Lee (2016)
- Kickoff return touchdowns: 1, Jimmy Smith (1995); Reggie Barlow (1997); Alvis Whitted (1999); Elvis Joseph (2001); Derrick Wimbush (2005); Maurice Jones-Drew (2006 & 2007); Marqise Lee (2016); Jamal Agnew (2021)
- Punt returns: 49, Alvin Pearman (2005)
- Punt return yards: 555, Reggie Barlow (1998)
- Punt return average (min. 15 returns): 16.7, Rashad Greene (2015)
- Punt return touchdowns: 2, Parker Washington (2025)

=== Defense ===
- Interceptions: 8, Rashean Mathis (2006)
- Interceptions returned for touchdown: 2, Rashean Mathis (2008); Aaron Beasley (1999)
- Sacks: 17.5, Josh Hines-Allen (2023)
- Tackles: 184, Foyesade Oluokun (2022)
- Takeaways: 9, Donovin Darius (2004)

=== Fumbles ===
- Fumbles: 14, Blake Bortles (2015), Blaine Gabbert (2011), David Garrard (2009), Mark Brunell (1996)
- Fumbles lost: 9, Trevor Lawrence (2022)
- Forced fumbles: 8, Tony Brackens (1999)
- Opponent fumbles recovered: 4, Donovin Darius (2004)

== Rookie records ==
=== Scoring ===
- Points in a season: 108, Cam Little (2024)
- Touchdowns in a season: 17, Fred Taylor (1998)

=== Passing ===
- Pass completions in a season: 359, Trevor Lawrence (2021)
- Pass completions in a game: 32, Trevor Lawrence, at Seattle Seahawks, October 31, 2021; Blake Bortles, at Tennessee Titans, October 12, 2014
- Pass attempts in a season: 602, Trevor Lawrence (2021)
- Pass attempts in a game: 54, Trevor Lawrence, at Seattle Seahawks, October 31, 2021
- Passing yards in a season: 3,641, Trevor Lawrence (2021)
- Passing yards in a game: 374, Gardner Minshew, at Carolina Panthers, October 6, 2019
- Passing touchdowns in a season: 21, Gardner Minshew (2019)
- Passing touchdowns in a game: 3, Trevor Lawrence, at Houston Texans, September 13, 2021; Gardner Minshew, vs. Indianapolis Colts, December 29, 2019; October 27, 2019 vs. New York Jets
- Interceptions in a season: 17, Trevor Lawrence (2021); Blake Bortles (2014)
- Interceptions in a game: 4, Jake Luton, vs. Pittsburgh Steelers, November 20, 2020

=== Rushing ===
- Rushing attempts in a season: 268, Leonard Fournette (2017)
- Rushing attempts in a game: 32, Fred Taylor, vs. Detroit Lions, December 6, 1998
- Rushing yards in a season: 1,223, Fred Taylor (1998)
- Rushing yards in a game: 183, Fred Taylor, vs. Detroit Lions, December 6, 1998
- Rushing touchdowns in a season: 14, Fred Taylor (1998)
- Rushing touchdowns in a game: 3, Fred Taylor, vs. Tampa Bay Buccaneers, November 15, 1998

=== Receiving ===
- Receptions in a season: 87, Brian Thomas Jr. (2024)
- Receptions in a game: 10, Brian Thomas Jr., vs. New York Jets, December 15, 2024; Pete Mitchell, at Tampa Bay Buccaneers, November 19, 1995
- Receiving yards in a season: 1,282, Brian Thomas Jr. (2024)
- Receiving touchdowns in a season: 10, Brian Thomas Jr. (2024)
- Yards per reception in a season (min. 25 receptions): 17.8, Keelan Cole (2017)
- Yards per reception in a game (min. 4 receptions): 33.7, Justin Blackmon, at Houston Texans, November 18, 2012
- 100-yard receiving games in a season: 4, Brian Thomas Jr. (2024)

=== Yardage ===
- Scrimmage yards in a season: 1,644, Fred Taylor (1998)
- All-purpose yards in a season: 2,250, Maurice Jones-Drew (2006)

=== Defense ===
- Tackles in a season: 161, Bryan Schwartz (1995)
- Tackles in a game: 21, Bryan Schwartz, at Detroit Lions, December 17, 1995
- Sacks in a season: 10.5, Josh Hines-Allen (2019)
- Interceptions in a season: 5, Reggie Nelson (2007)
- Takeaways in a season; 5:
  - Derek Cox (2009)
  - Reggie Nelson (2007)
  - Fernando Bryant (1999)

== Firsts ==
- First win: vs. Houston Oilers, 1 October 1995
- First touchdown: Steve Beuerlein (QB) to Randy Jordan (RB), vs. Cincinnati Bengals, 10 September 1995
- First passing/receiving touchdown: Steve Beuerlein (QB) to Randy Jordan (RB), vs. Cincinnati Bengals, 10 September 1995
- First rushing touchdown: Mark Brunell, vs. Cincinnati Bengals, 10 September 1995
- First fumble returned for a touchdown: Chris Hudson vs. Tennessee Oilers, 2 November 1997
- First interception returned for a touchdown: Mickey Washington, vs. Cleveland Browns, 22 October 1995
- First kick return for a touchdown: Jimmy Smith, vs. Denver Broncos, 3 December 1995
- First punt return for a touchdown: Reggie Barlow, vs. New England Patriots, 7 December 1997
- First 3,000 yard passer in a season: Mark Brunell, 1996
- First 4,000 yard passer in a season: Mark Brunell, 1996
- First 1,000 yard rusher in a season: Fred Taylor, 1998
- First 1,000 yard receiver in a season: Jimmy Smith (1,244), Keenan McCardell (1,129), 1996
