= Brunel (disambiguation) =

Isambard Kingdom Brunel (1806–1859) was an English mechanical and civil engineer.

Brunel may also refer to:

== People ==
- Brunel (surname), a surname (and a list of people with the name)
- Brunel Fucien, Haitian footballer
- Marc Isambard Brunel, French-British engineer

== Places ==
- Brunel Bridge (disambiguation)
- Brunel College, a predecessor to City of Bristol College
- Brunel Manor, mansion near Torquay, Devon, England
- Brunel Museum, London
- Brunel University London, England

== Others ==
- Brunel Award, an international award for good railway design
- Brunel FM, a radio station in Swindon, England
- NR Brunel, the standard typeface for signing at Network Rail managed stations

== See also ==
- Team Brunel, a Volvo Ocean 65 yacht
- Brunel Sunergy, a yacht
- Brunell
