= Burnel =

Burnel is a surname and a given name. Notable people with the name include:

== Surname ==
- Étienne-Laurent-Pierre Burnel (1762–1835), French colonial administrator
- Jean-Jacques Burnel (born 1952), English musician with the punk rock band the Stranglers

== Given name ==
- Burnel Okana-Stazi (born 1983), Congolese football player

== See also ==
- Brunel (surname)
