= Fiona Burnell =

American physicist (born 1979)

Fiona J. Burnell (born 1979) is a Canadian-American condensed matter physicist who studies exotic states of matter including fractional quantum Hall states and topological insulators. She is Tang Family Professor in the School of Physics and Astronomy at the University of Minnesota, and a quondam fellow of All Souls College, Oxford.

== Education and career ==
Burnell graduated from the University of British Columbia in 2002, and received a Ph.D. from Princeton University in 2009. At Princeton, she was a student of Shivaji Sondhi. Her dissertation was On exotic orders in strongly correlated systems.

She was a postdoctoral researcher at All Souls College from 2009 to 2013, and continues to be listed as a quondam fellow at All Souls. She joined the University of Minnesota in 2013; she became a full professor, and was appointed as the inaugural Tang Family Professor, in 2024.

== Recognition ==
Burnell was named as a Fellow of the American Physical Society (APS) in 2023, after a nomination from the APS Division of Condensed Matter Physics, "for outstanding contributions toward the elucidation of exotic phases of matter, including topological phases that are not described by the conventional Landau classification based on broken symmetries".
