= Ole Brunell =

Finnish minister

Ole Brunell, currently known as Shlomo Brunell (born 1953 in Swedish-speaking Kokkola, Finland), is a Finnish former Lutheran minister; he converted to Judaism.

Brunell was ordained as a minister in the Evangelical Lutheran Church of Finland in 1978. He served as a pastor in both Finland and Australia. He preached and ministered in Swedish, English, and Finnish during his career as a minister.

Eventually, he ceased to believe in the teachings of the Lutheran Church and ultimately came not to believe in Christianity at all and left the Church. He never stopped believing in God. For six years, he and his family had no formal religion.

Six years later, he, his wife, and four daughters converted to Judaism. The conversion was rejected by Orthodox Jews. Eventually, the leaders allowed it and all were converted. Upon conversion, Brunell changed his first name from “Ole” to “Shlomo ben Avraham”, and his wife changed her name from “Runa” to “Ruth”. The family retained the name “Brunell” and moved to Israel, where they currently live.

Brunell wrote of his experience in a book entitled Strangers No More: One Family’s Exceptional Journey from Christianity to Judaism, ISBN 965-229-304-0 published by Gefen Publishing House in Jerusalem in 2005.
