= Mark Brunell =

American football player and coach (born 1970)

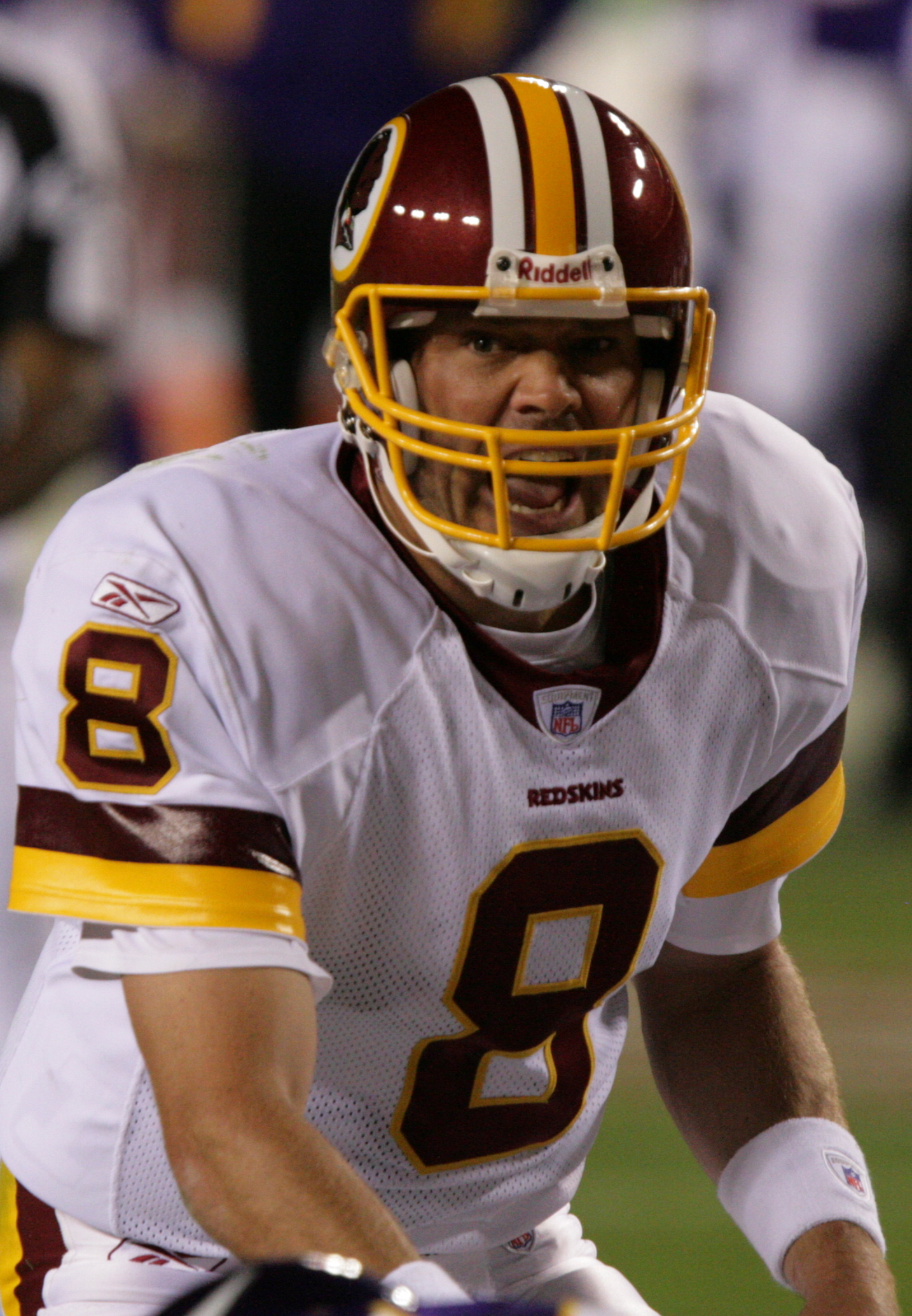
- Brunell with the Washington Redskins in 2006

Detroit Lions
- Title: Quarterbacks coach

Personal information
- Born: September 17, 1970 (age 56); Los Angeles, California, U.S.
- Listed height: 6 ft 1 in (1.85 m)
- Listed weight: 215 lb (98 kg)

Career information
- Position: Quarterback (No. 8, 11)
- High school: St. Joseph (Santa Maria, California)
- College: Washington (1988–1992)
- NFL draft: 1993: 5th round, 118th overall pick

Career history

Playing
- Green Bay Packers (1993–1994); Jacksonville Jaguars (1995–2003); Washington Redskins (2004–2007); New Orleans Saints (2008–2009); New York Jets (2010–2011)

Coaching
- Providence School (2012) Assistant coach; Episcopal School of Jacksonville (2013–2020) Head coach; Detroit Lions (2021–present) Quarterbacks coach

Awards and highlights
- Super Bowl champion (XLIV); 3× Pro Bowl (1996, 1997, 1999); NFL passing yards leader (1996); Pride of the Jaguars; National champion (1991); 2× Second-team All-Pac-10 (1990, 1992); Rose Bowl MVP (1991); Rose Bowl Hall of Fame (2015)

Career NFL statistics
- Passing attempts: 4,640
- Passing completions: 2,761
- Completion percentage: 59.5%
- TD–INT: 184–108
- Passing yards: 32,072
- Passer rating: 84
- Stats at Pro Football Reference

Mark Allen Brunell (born September 17, 1970) is an American professional football coach and former quarterback who is the quarterbacks coach for the Detroit Lions of the National Football League (NFL). He previously played in the NFL for 19 seasons, most notably with the Jacksonville Jaguars. For his accomplishments in Jacksonville, he was inducted to the Pride of the Jaguars in 2013.

Brunell played college football for the Washington Huskies and was selected by the Green Bay Packers in the fifth round of the 1993 NFL draft. After two seasons, Brunell was traded to the expansion Jaguars for their inaugural 1995 season. Within their second season, he helped the team obtain the franchise's first winning record, playoff berth, postseason victory, and AFC Championship Game appearance. Brunell went on to guide Jacksonville to four consecutive playoff runs within their first five seasons, making them the first NFL expansion team to do so, and clinched the franchise's first division title in 1999 en route to a second AFC Championship appearance. He also received three Pro Bowl selections with the Jaguars.

Following his 2004 departure from Jacksonville, Brunell played for the Washington Redskins, New Orleans Saints, and New York Jets until retiring in 2011. With the Saints, he was part of the team that won the franchise's first Super Bowl title in Super Bowl XLIV, where he served as a backup and holder. Since retiring, he has pursued a coaching career and became the Lions' quarterbacks coach in 2021.

== Early life ==
Brunell was the starting quarterback for the St. Joseph High School Knights of Santa Maria, California, in the 1985, 1986, and 1987 seasons. Brunell led his team to two league championships and one appearance in the CIF Central Section finals.

As a senior with SJHS, he completed 172 of 323 passes for 2,376 yards and 13 touchdowns, averaged 36.3 yards per punt, and added nine rushing touchdowns.

== College career ==
Brunell signed with the University of Washington out of high school in 1988, joining a highly touted recruiting class that included future fellow NFL players Lincoln Kennedy and Steve Emtman.

Brunell saw his first action in his redshirt freshman year, and took over the starting duties in his sophomore season in 1990. Brunell's abilities as a run-pass combo quarterback flashed potential from his first start. In his third start, Brunell led the Huskies in a 31–0 romp over a highly ranked USC team, which established the Huskies of the early 1990s as a potential force in Pac-10 football. While Brunell continued to develop throughout his first season as a starter, the Huskies climbed in the rankings. An early-season loss to the eventual national champion Colorado and a late-season 25–22 loss to UCLA were the only setbacks for what, by season's end, was a dominant Husky team. With the Huskies crowned Pac-10 champions, Brunell played his best game yet in the Rose Bowl and was named the game's MVP as Washington coasted to a 46–34 win over Big Ten Conference champion Iowa. After building a 39–14 lead after three quarters, Washington heavily substituted with reserves; the Hawkeyes scored twenty points in the fourth quarter.

Though the Huskies finished the season ranked 5th in the Associated Press poll, one poll crowned them national champions. Irrespective of their final ranking, the Huskies, with Brunell's star rising, seemed set to soar to even loftier heights in 1991. Brunell was expected to lead the Huskies in 1991, but a devastating knee injury in the annual Husky spring game would sideline Brunell and cast the Husky hopes for a national championship run in doubt. Brunell, however, was capably replaced by Puyallup native Billy Joe Hobert, and the University of Washington went on to win their first two games in Brunell's absence. Though Brunell was not yet fully recovered, he returned months ahead of schedule to action in Washington's third game in 1991. Brunell received a standing ovation upon his return in the 56–3 victory over Kansas State.

Brunell would be given an opportunity to lead series on a part-time basis in the remainder of Husky games as the season progressed, typically at least one drive in each 2nd quarter in addition to the second half. The 1991 Washington team defeated every regular-season opponent with most games providing plenty of playing time for younger and backup players.

On January 1, 1992, Brunell played a small role (throwing a touchdown pass to Mario Bailey) in Washington's second straight Rose Bowl victory, this time over Michigan. Washington finished the season ranked first in the coaches poll, winning the National Championship, and 2nd in the Associated Press poll, behind undefeated Miami.

In 1992, with two successful quarterbacks returning (Hobert and Brunell), Brunell was unable to wrestle the starting QB spot away from Hobert and as such contributed in a limited role during their first eight games (all wins). However, during the week of November 2, 1992, the Los Angeles Times ran an exposé on Washington football wherein current starter Hobert was implicated in actions seemingly in violation of NCAA rules. As a result, Hobert was immediately suspended and Brunell was thrust back into the starting role for the Huskies. Now a senior, Brunell steered the devastated Huskies to one win in their last three regular-season games. The Huskies, however, again won the Pac-10 and Brunell started his second Rose Bowl game, this time against Michigan.

In 2015, Brunell was inducted into the Rose Bowl Hall of Fame.

== Professional career ==
Pre-draft measurables
Height	Weight	Arm length	Hand span	40-yard dash	10-yard split	20-yard split	20-yard shuttle	Vertical jump	Wonderlic
6 ft 1 in (1.85 m)	206 lb (93 kg)	32 1/4 in (0.82 m)	9 1/8 in (0.23 m)	4.70 s	1.63 s	2.73 s	4.19 s	30 1/2 in (0.77 m)	22
All values from NFL Combine

=== Green Bay Packers ===
The Green Bay Packers selected Brunell in the fifth round (118th overall) of the 1993 NFL draft. Brunell was the fourth quarterback drafted in 1993 and was the second quarterback drafted from Washington after Billy Joe Hobert was selected in the third round (58th overall) by the Los Angeles Raiders. This became only the second time two quarterbacks were drafted from the same school in the same draft. It was speculated that Brunell's fall to the fifth round was due to fears that he might not be able to adapt to the pro game.

Brunell entered training camp as a backup quarterback and competed to be the primary backup against Ty Detmer. Brunell and Detmer ended up alternating as the primary backup quarterback, behind Brett Favre, throughout 1993 and 1994. As a rookie, Brunell did not appear in any games.

On October 20, 1994, Brunell made his professional regular season debut during a 13–10 overtime loss at the Minnesota Vikings in Week 8. Brunell entered the game during the second quarter after Brett Favre suffered a hip pointer. He immediately engineered a 49-yard drive that ended with his first career touchdown on a five-yard rush. Brunell finished the game completing 11 of 24 pass attempts for 79 passing yards and was held without a touchdown pass or interception.

Brunell became a restricted free agent after the 1994 NFL season and received a contract offer from the Philadelphia Eagles, who had just hired former Green Bay Packers’ defensive coordinator Ray Rhodes as their new head coach. Rhodes hired former Green Bay Packers’ wide receivers coach Jon Gruden to be the Philadelphia Eagles’ offensive coordinator and worked out a trade to acquire Brunell. Brunell was reluctant to accept the five-year contract offer from the Philadelphia Eagles as he did not want to spend his twenties as a backup quarterback behind Randall Cunningham. The Packers and Eagles agreed on the terms of a trade, but were unable to finalize the deal after Brunell declined to sign a long-term deal with the Philadelphia Eagles.

=== Jacksonville Jaguars ===
On 21 April 1995, in the first trade in the history of the new Jacksonville Jaguars, the franchise traded third (66th overall) and fifth round (170th overall) picks in the 1995 NFL draft to the Green Bay Packers in exchange for Brunell. The Jacksonville Jaguars signed Brunell to a three-year contract. Brunell started 13 games in 1995, completed 201 out of 346 passes, for 2,168 yards, with 15 touchdowns and 7 interceptions. He also rushed for 480 yards.

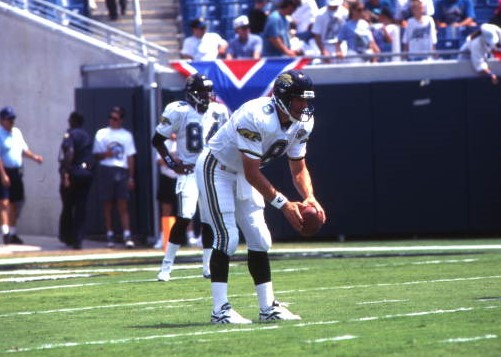
Brunell warming up before the Jaguars first game in 1995

During his years in Jacksonville, Brunell was selected to the Pro Bowl three times, during the 1996, 1997, and 1999 seasons and awarded the Pro Bowl MVP in the 1996 game. With Brunell starting, the Jaguars went to the playoffs four times, won an AFC Central Division title, and became the first NFL expansion team to make the playoffs three times in its first four seasons of play. He led the Jaguars to the AFC Championship Game twice, once in 1996 in which they lost to the New England Patriots, and again in 1999 where they lost to the Tennessee Titans.

Brunell injured his elbow during the Jaguars Week 3 game versus the Indianapolis Colts and was replaced by rookie first round pick Byron Leftwich. It would be the final time Brunell took the field as a member of the Jaguars as Leftwich would start the rest of the 2003 season.

As a starter since their inaugural season, Brunell left the team holding all of the Jacksonville Jaguars passing records and as of 2026, still holds many of them.

In December 2013, Brunell was inducted into the Pride of the Jaguars, the team's Hall of Fame equivalent.

=== Washington Redskins ===
He was traded to the Washington Redskins prior to the 2004 season.

During the 2004 season, limited by a hamstring injury, Brunell struggled and would be benched midseason for backup quarterback Patrick Ramsey. Ramsey's play towards the end of that season and following pre-season would lead to a quarterback controversy where Brunell would be benched going into the 2005 season. This would change in 2005 after Ramsey suffered an early season injury that thrust Brunell back into the starter's role.

In 2005, Brunell played much better and led the team to a 10–6 record and a playoff victory over the Tampa Bay Buccaneers. He finished third in the 2005 NFL Comeback Player of the Year awards.

Brunell's most prolific moment in the 2005 season was during Week 2, when he completed two long passes to wide receiver Santana Moss for two touchdowns in the final four minutes of the fourth quarter to defeat the Dallas Cowboys on Monday Night Football, 14–13.

On September 24, 2006, Brunell broke the NFL record for most consecutive completions in single game when he completed his first 22 passes against the Houston Texans. Brunell also set the Redskins franchise record for highest completion percentage in a single game (88.9%). The previous record was held by Hall of Fame quarterback Sammy Baugh for 66 years (87.5%). On November 13, 2006, after winning only three of their first nine games of 2006, Brunell was benched in favor of Jason Campbell, Washington's 2005 first round draft pick.

He served as the Redskins third-string quarterback in 2007 and did not appear in a game.

=== New Orleans Saints ===
On March 13, 2008, Brunell was signed by the New Orleans Saints. As the Saints have not issued number 8 since Archie Manning retired, Brunell changed his jersey number to 11, the only time in his career he would wear a jersey number besides his customary number 8.

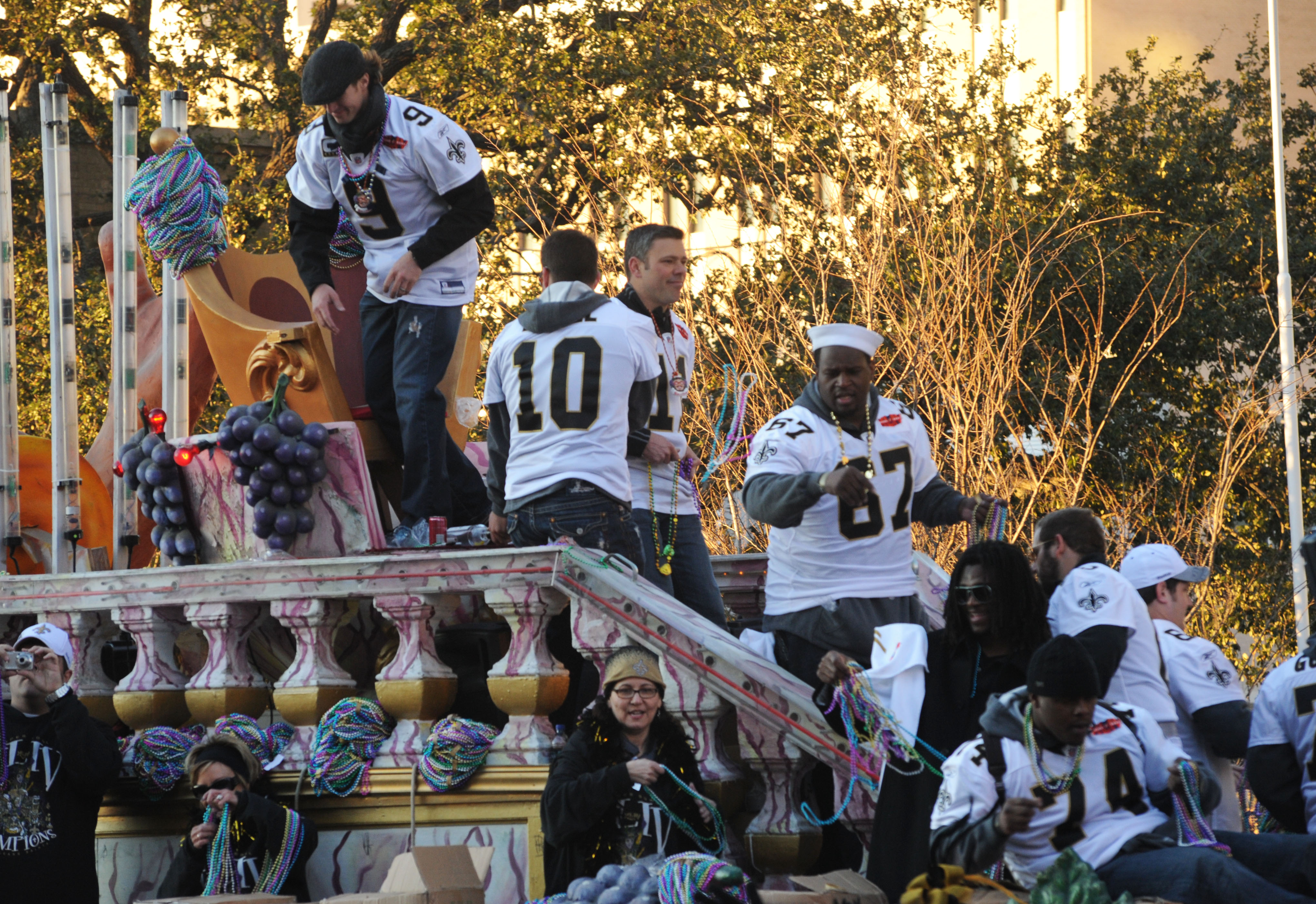
As backup quarterback behind Drew Brees (#9), Brunell (next to Chase Daniel (#10)) won his first Super Bowl title after the 2009 season with the New Orleans Saints

He entered the 2008 season as the backup to Drew Brees, appearing in just two games. In 2009, he appeared in all 16 games as the holder on the Saints place-kicking unit, and saw his first playing time at quarterback in three years during a week 17 loss to the Carolina Panthers, as the Saints had already clinched homefield advantage and rested starter Drew Brees, as well as many other starters. Although he played little for the Saints, he was noted for his role as a veteran advisor to the Saints' starting quarterback, Drew Brees.

During the Saints playoff run on January 24, 2010, Brunell was the holder on the 40-yard field goal kicked by Garrett Hartley in overtime against the Minnesota Vikings in the NFC Championship Game to send the New Orleans Saints to the team's first ever Super Bowl. On February 7, 2010, for the Super Bowl, Brunell served as the backup QB behind Drew Brees, and the holder for Garrett Hartley. Brunell and Hartley's role as the kicking unit helped the Saints convert some critical kicks, going 3 for 3 on three long field goals (46 yards, 44 yards, 47 yards), and an extra point, to score a total of 10 points in the first three quarters, helping keep the score close going into the fourth quarter, with the Saints down by only one point (16–17). The Colts would never score again, as the momentum shifted the Saints way. Brunell earned his first and only Super Bowl ring with the New Orleans Saints when the team won its first franchise championship by defeating the Indianapolis Colts 31–17 in Super Bowl XLIV.

=== New York Jets ===
Brunell was a free agent after the 2009 season, and did not re-sign with the Saints. On July 28, 2010, he signed a two-year deal to play for the New York Jets. Brunell completed his first pass for the Jets on October 3 against the Buffalo Bills. In the last regular game of the 2010 season, while filling in for starting quarterback Mark Sanchez, Brunell threw his first scoring pass since 2006, a 17-yard touchdown pass to Santonio Holmes with 15 seconds left in the opening half. He then went on to throw a second scoring pass for 52 yards to Braylon Edwards in the second half. Brunell sat on the bench as the Jets made it to the AFC Championship but eventually lost to the Steelers 24–19.

After one season with the Jets, he was released on July 29, 2011. He was re-signed two days later at a reduced salary.

In April 2012, Brunell stated that he would like to play another season if the opportunity presented itself, contradicting a report from the Florida Times-Union that he was ready to retire.

=== Legacy ===
When Washington Redskins quarterback Jason Campbell, who played quarterback for the team after Brunell, was asked what player he learned the most from in his career, Campbell said it was Mark Brunell. Campbell said "a nice tribute about how the man he replaced helped him become a better person off the field."

In 2012, Football Nation ranked Brunell the twenty-ninth best quarterback of the post-merger era.

== Career statistics ==
=== NFL ===
==== Regular season ====
Legend
	Won the Super Bowl
	Led the league
**Bold**	Career high

Year	Team	Games			Passing								Rushing				Sacked		Fumbles	
Year	Team	GP	GS	Record	Cmp	Att	Pct	Yds	Avg	TD	Int	Rtg	Att	Yds	Avg	TD	Sck	SckY	Fum	Lost
1993	GB	0	0	—	DNP															
1994	GB	2	0	—	12	27	44.4	95	3.5	0	0	53.8	6	7	1.2	1	2	16	1	1
1995	JAX	13	10	3–7	201	346	58.1	2,168	6.3	15	7	82.6	67	**480**	**7.2**	**4**	39	238	5	2
1996	JAX	**16**	**16**	9–7	**353**	**557**	63.4	**4,367**	7.8	19	**20**	84.0	**80**	396	5.0	3	50	257	**14**	3
1997	JAX	14	14	9–5	264	435	60.7	3,281	7.5	18	7	**91.2**	48	257	5.4	2	33	189	4	2
1998	JAX	13	13	10–3	208	354	58.8	2,601	7.3	20	9	89.9	49	192	3.9	0	28	172	3	2
1999	JAX	15	15	**13–2**	259	441	58.7	3,060	6.9	14	9	82.0	47	208	4.4	1	29	174	6	1
2000	JAX	**16**	**16**	7–9	311	512	60.7	3,640	7.1	20	14	84.0	48	236	4.9	2	54	289	7	3
2001	JAX	15	15	6–9	289	473	61.1	3,309	7.0	19	13	84.1	39	224	5.7	1	**57**	**387**	8	3
2002	JAX	15	15	6–9	245	416	58.9	2,788	6.7	17	7	85.7	43	207	4.8	0	34	210	5	2
2003	JAX	3	3	0–3	54	82	**65.9**	484	5.9	2	0	89.7	8	19	2.4	1	9	46	1	0
2004	WAS	9	9	3–6	118	237	49.8	1,194	5.0	7	6	63.9	19	62	3.3	0	15	105	6	3
2005	WAS	**16**	15	9–6	262	454	57.7	3,050	6.7	**23**	10	85.9	42	111	2.6	0	27	213	11	**6**
2006	WAS	10	9	3–6	162	260	62.3	1,789	6.9	8	4	86.5	13	34	2.6	0	12	92	5	1
2007	WAS	0	0	—	DNP															
2008	NO	2	0	—	0	0	0.0	0	0.0	0	0	0.0	0	0	0.0	0	0	0	0	0
2009	NO	4	1	0–1	15	30	50.0	102	3.4	0	1	44.0	4	-12	-3.0	0	0	0	0	0
2010	NYJ	2	0	—	6	12	50.0	117	**9.2**	2	1	86.8	0	0	0.0	0	1	7	0	0
2011	NYJ	**16**	0	—	1	3	33.3	27	9.0	0	0	67.4	0	0	0.0	0	0	0	0	0
Total		176	151	78–73	2,754	4,625	59.5	32,072	6.9	184	108	84.0	513	2,421	4.7	15	389	2,388	76	29

==== Playoffs ====
Year	Team	Games			Passing								Rushing			
Year	Team	GP	GS	Record	Cmp	Att	Pct	Yds	Avg	TD	Int	Rtg	Att	Yds	Avg	TD
1993	GB	0	0	—	DNP											
1994	GB	1	0	—	3	11	27.3	25	2.3	0	0	39.6	4	26	**6.5**	0
1996	JAX	**3**	**3**	**2–1**	**56**	**100**	56.0	**674**	6.7	3	**4**	70.2	**16**	**87**	5.4	0
1997	JAX	1	1	0–1	18	32	56.3	203	6.3	0	1	62.4	3	4	1.3	0
1998	JAX	2	2	1–1	38	65	**58.5**	317	4.9	**4**	3	72.4	6	7	1.2	0
1999	JAX	2	2	1–1	24	47	51.1	331	**7.0**	3	2	**77.5**	2	5	2.5	0
2005	WAS	2	2	1–1	29	52	55.8	283	5.4	1	1	69.6	8	18	2.3	0
2009	NO	0	0	—	DNP											
2010	NYJ	0	0	—	DNP											
Total		11	10	5–5	168	307	54.7	1,833	6.0	11	11	69.6	39	147	3.8	0

=== College ===
Season	Team	GP	Passing									Rushing			
Season	Team	GP	Cmp	Att	Pct	Yds	Avg	AY/A	TD	Int	Rtg	Att	Yds	Avg	TD
1989	Washington	3	6	12	50	57	4.8	-2.8	0	2	56.6	4	12	3	0
1990	Washington	11	118	253	46.6	1,732	6.8	6.5	14	8	116.1	105	444	4.2	10
1991	Washington	8	26	44	59.1	333	7.6	7.3	4	2	143.6	13	25	1.9	1
1992	Washington	11	109	189	57.7	1,301	6.9	6.5	5	4	120.0	68	197	2.9	8
Career		33	259	498	52	3,423	6.9	6.4	23	16	118.6	190	678	3.6	19

== Coaching career ==
=== High school coaching ===
Brunell was an assistant football coach at Providence School in Jacksonville, Florida in 2012. In January 2013, Brunell became the new head football coach and program director at Episcopal School of Jacksonville. Episcopal went 2–8 in Brunell's first season, then improved to 8–3 in 2014.

=== Detroit Lions ===
On January 28, 2021, Brunell was hired by the Detroit Lions as quarterbacks coach.

=== Head coaching record ===
Year	Team	Overall	Conference	Standing	Bowl/playoffs
Episcopal School of Jacksonville Eagles () (2013–2022)
2013	Episcopal School of Jacksonville	2–8	0–2	3rd	
2014	Episcopal School of Jacksonville	8–4	0–2	3rd	
2015	Episcopal School of Jacksonville	6–5	1–2	3rd	
2016	Episcopal School of Jacksonville	8–2	1–1	1st	
2017	Episcopal School of Jacksonville	3–5–1	0–0	T–5th	
2018	Episcopal School of Jacksonville	7–3	1–0	1st	
2019	Episcopal School of Jacksonville	10–2	0–0		
2020	Episcopal School of Jacksonville	7–3	0–0		
Episcopal School of Jacksonville:		51–32–1	3–7		
Total:		51–32–1			
National championship Conference title Conference division title or championship game berth

== Personal life ==
=== Family ===
Brunell is married and has a daughter, and three sons.
