= Brunel Bridge =

Brunel Bridge is an informal or local reference to any one of several famous bridges in England built by Isambard Kingdom Brunel, including:

- The Clifton Suspension Bridge across the Avon Gorge in Bristol
  - Cumberland Basin (Bristol) swing bridge marketed as the other Brunel bridge
- The Royal Albert Bridge across the River Tamar from Devon to Cornwall
- Maidenhead Railway Bridge across the River Thames in Maidenhead

or:

- The proposed pedestrian and cycle bridge over the River Thames between Rotherhithe and Canary Wharf

== Other ==
- The Brunel Bridge Roundabout in Slough, famous by its appearance in the opening titles of the Ricky Gervais sitcom The Office
