= Benjamin Burnell =

British painter

Benjamin Burnell (1769–1828) was a British portrait painter. His works include portraits of Sir Jacob Astley (sometime between 1780 and 1817), Harvey Christian Combe (1800) and Henry Villiers Parker, Viscount Boringdon (1813). The National Portrait Gallery also contains his chalk drawings of William Holwell Carr (1798) and Sir Samuel Egerton Brydges, 1st Baronet (1817), whilst others are in private collections.
