= Todd Brunel =

American clarinetist

Todd Brunel is an American clarinetist who leads a dual life as a crossover classical and jazz musician. In the world premiere event, 'From Requiem to Renewal' at Boston College, "clarinetist Todd Brunel and pianist Synthia Sture played with tremendous virtuosity and heart."

He has premiered numerous works by such composers as Matthew D. Harder, Rick Sowash, Ara Sarkissian, the Alta Voz Composers Alliance, Vuk Kulenovic, Ludmilla Germain, Arnesto Klar, Pamela Watson, Vache Sharyfyan and composer/conductor Lawrence 'Butch' Morris. He collaborated with saxophonist Bobby Watson (as principal clarinetist with the Opera Ebony of Harlem) and has performed with such groups as ALEA III, the American Opera Musical Theater Company, the Andover Chamber Players, the Greenwich Village Orchestra and many New York and Boston area orchestras.

Brunel has made guest appearances at Carnegie Hall, Harvard University, the Boston and New England Conservatories, the Manhattan School, the SEAMUS Festival and the Winter Sun Music Festival, where he collaborated with legendary pianist Dalton Baldwin. Brunel is the artistic director of the Black Dust Ensemble, a featured performance group with the 'Musica Eclectica' Series at Eastern Nazarene College. As a jazz/improvisational musician and composer, he produced and performed in the critically acclaimed 'Vortex Series' for improvisational music, which was the jazz "pick of the week" in the Boston Phoenix and The Boston Globe.

He has been a featured artist at Rob Chalfen's Subconscious Cafe in collaboration with such groups as Andalusian Dream, the Circadian Rhythm Kings and such artists as pianist David Maxwell, violinist Katt Hernandez and cellist Daniel Levin. In New York, Brunel recorded the electro-acoustic work 'She Stood Weeping' by composer George 'Skip' Brunner, which gained international recognition. He has worked with saxophonists James Carter and Blaise Siwula, and continues his collaborations with singer/songwriter Lilli Lewis, with whom he has made numerous radio and television appearances across the United States. In a review of the recording "The Blind Man" from the album The Coming of John, the gods of music.com described his playing in the plural: "Sweeping solos blown in a diverse stream of study nothingness.........played by true cats, heavy pros".

Brunel has been a guest artist at ABC No Rio, Art Beat Festival, Smalls, CGBG's Gallery, the National Black Arts Festival and the Montreal Jazz Festival. He has premiered his own compositions at Dartmouth College, the Longy School of Music, Boston University and the Electric Rainbow Coalition Festival. His website clarinetconspiracy.com is dedicated to innovative music and challenges mainstream musical convention.
