= Barry Watkins =

Welsh footballer

Personal information
- Full name: Randall Burnell Watkins
- Date of birth: 30 November 1921
- Place of birth: Bedlinog, Wales
- Date of death: 20 June 2004 (aged 82)
- Positions: Inside forward; full back

Senior career*
Years	Team	Apps	(Gls)
1945–1957	Bristol Rovers	116	(7)
- * Club domestic league appearances and goals

Randall Burnell 'Barry' Watkins (30 November 1921 – 20 June 2004) was a footballer, who played in The Football League for Bristol Rovers after the Second World War.

Having been born in Bedlinog, South Wales, Watkins played local football for Merthyr and Bedlinog before joining Wolverhampton Wanderers as an amateur wartime player in 1939. Towards the end of the conflict he joined Bristol Rovers, also as an amateur, before becoming a part-time professional with the club in October 1945. He went on to make 116 League appearances for The Pirates and scored seven goals, playing as both an inside forward and a full back during this spell, before finally retiring from football in 1957, aged 35.

He remained a part-time pro throughout his football career, combining this with a job in the engines division of the Bristol Aeroplane Company in Patchway. He died in June 2004.

== Sources ==
- Jay, Mike; Byrne, Stephen (1994). Pirates in Profile: A Who's Who of Bristol Rovers Players. Bristol: Potten, Baber & Murray. p. 281. ISBN 0-9524835-0-5.
- Byrne, Stephen; Jay, Mike (2003). Bristol Rovers Football Club - The Definitive History 1883-2003. Stroud: Tempus. p. 507. ISBN 0-7524-2717-2.
