= François-Nicolas Delaistre =

French sculptor

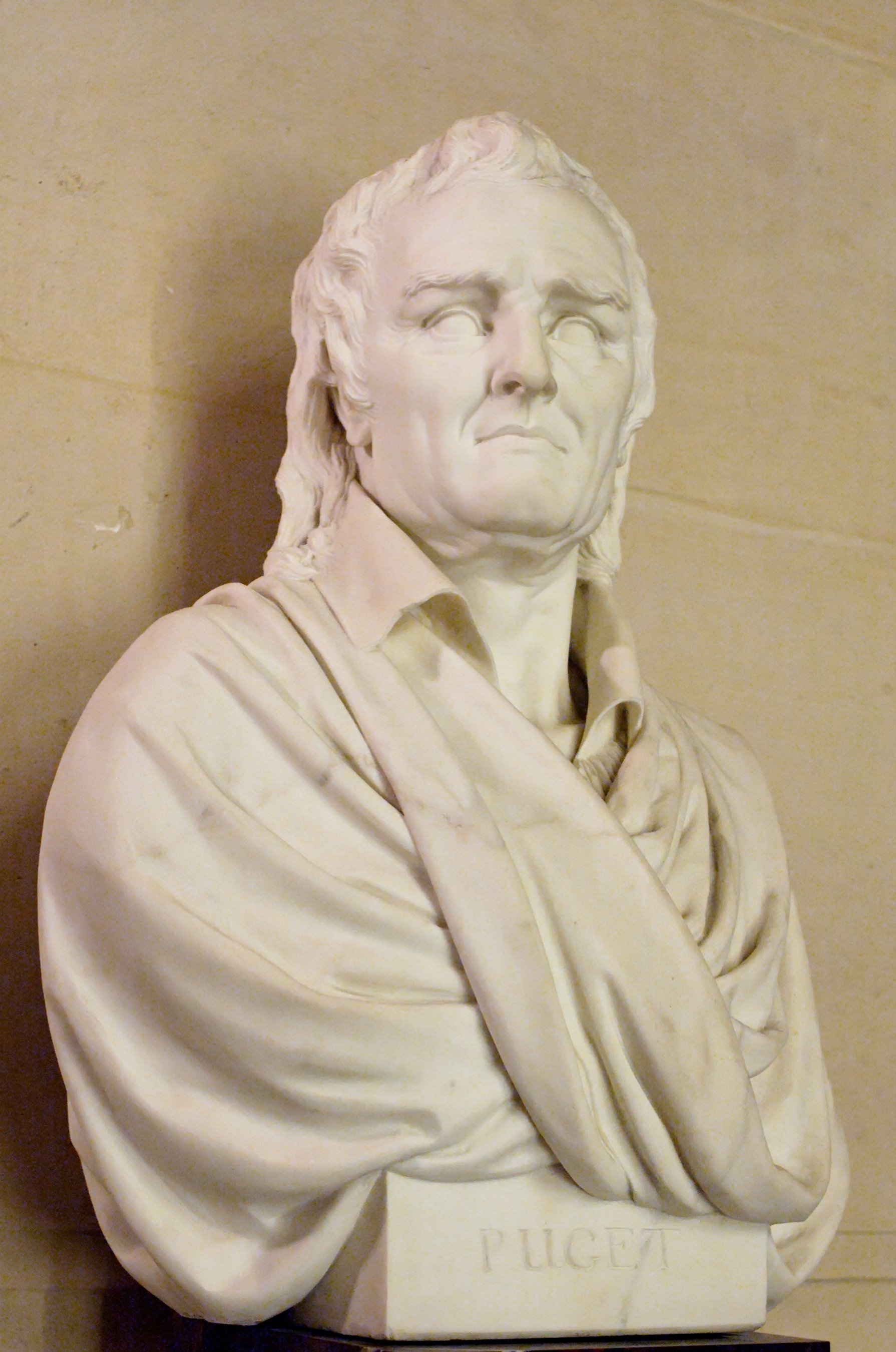
Bust of French sculptor Pierre Puget by François-Nicolas Delaistre, The Louvre, 1827

François-Nicolas Delaistre (Paris 9 March 1746 – 23 April 1832 Paris) was a French sculptor.

Delaistre was educated by Félix Lecomte and Louis-Claude Vassé. Delaistre won the Prix de Rome in 1772; he studied a year at the École royale des élèves protégés at the French Academy and later at the Académie de France in Rome between 1773 and 1777. It was there that he probably first met the architect Pierre-Adrien Pâris, with whom he later collaborated. His best-known work, the group Cupid and Psyche, was originally executed in Rome (the later marble version is in the Louvre at Paris).

The Nuttall Encyclopedia mentions "Delaistre, a French statuary, born in Paris (1836-1891)": this may be a relative of François Delaistre.
