= Burnell Tavern =

- U.S. National Register of Historic Places
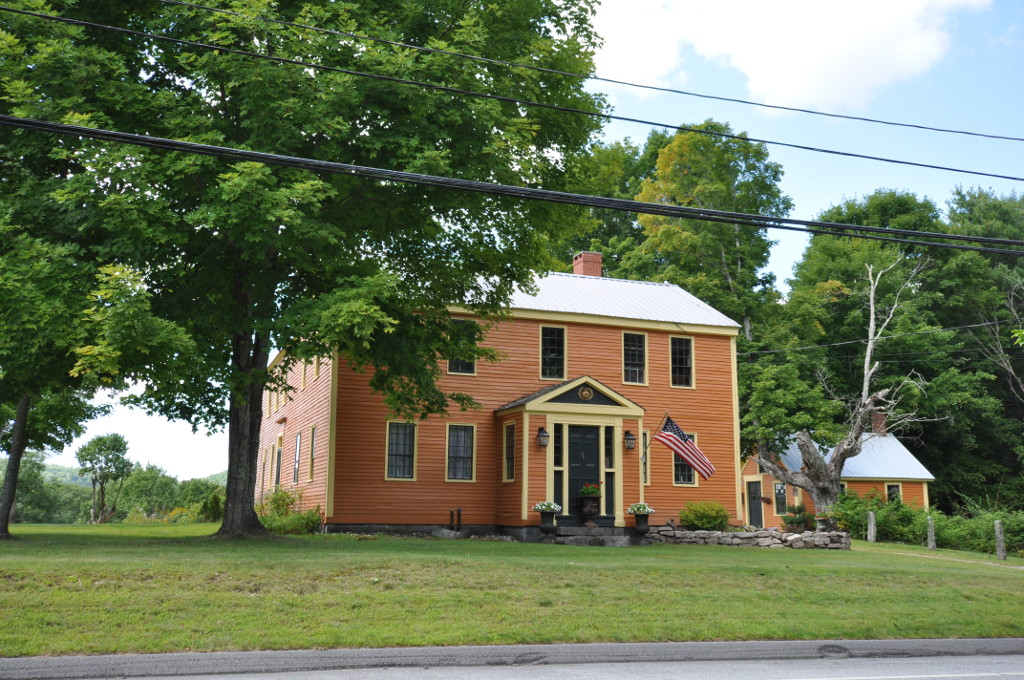

- Location within Maine Location within the United States
- Location: ME Route 113, Baldwin, Maine
- Coordinates: 43°50′1″N 70°46′46″W
- Area: less than one acre
- Built: 1737
- Architectural style: Colonial
- NRHP reference No.: 83003638
- Added to NRHP: December 29, 1983

The Burnell Tavern is an historic former tavern on Maine State Route 113 in West Baldwin, Maine. Built in 1737, it is the oldest building in the rural community, and has long been a local landmark. It was listed on the National Register of Historic Places on December 29, 1983. It is now a private residence, not open to the public.

== Description and history ==
The Burnell Tavern is located in West Baldwin, a dispersed rural area. It is set on the west side of the Pequawket Trail (Maine State Routes 5, 113 and 117), historically the principal route between the coast of southern Maine and Fryeburg, which was the location of the Native American community known as Pequawket. Its main block is a 2 1/2-story wood-frame structure, five bays wide, with a side-gable roof, two asymmetrically placed chimneys, clapboard siding, and a stone foundation. The front, facing east, is symmetrically arranged, with the entrance set in a gable-roofed vestibule projecting at the center, flanked by sidelight windows. A secondary entrance is located on the south side, topped by a transom window and entablature. A two-story ell extends to the rear, flush with the main block's south side, giving the building an L shape. At the rear of the property stands a 19th-century carriage barn.

The tavern was built in 1737 by Gideon Burnell, a local farmer, and is believed to be the oldest building standing in Baldwin. Burnell also operated local grist and saw mills, and a store. The tavern catered to travelers en route between Portland and central New Hampshire, and remained in the hands of Burnell's descendants into the 20th century. It is now a private residence.

== See also ==
- National Register of Historic Places listings in Cumberland County, Maine
