= Baltimore Ravens all-time roster =

748 players have appeared in at least one regular season or postseason game in the National Football League (NFL) for the Baltimore Ravens since 1996. This list is accurate through the end of the 2025 NFL season.

== A ==
- Andrew Adams
- Sam Adams
- Vashone Adams
- Quincy Adeboyejo
- Aaron Adeoye
- Nelson Agholor
- Kamar Aiken
- Otaro Alaka
- Derrick Alexander
- Jaire Alexander
- Rasheen Ali
- Anthony Allen
- Javorius Allen
- Terry Allen
- Bennie Anderson
- Mike Anderson
- Willie Anderson
- Mark Andrews
- Justin Armour
- Jalyn Armour-Davis
- Kyle Arrington
- Herman Arvie
- James Atkins
- Jeremiah Attaochu
- Malaesala Aumavae–Laulu
- Anthony Averett
- Chidobe Awuzie
- Brendon Ayanbadejo
- Obafemi Ayanbadejo

== B ==
- Jason Babin
- Robert Bailey
- Billy Bajema
- Randy Baldwin
- Tony Banks
- Justin Bannan
- Alex Bannister
- Antwan Barnes
- Rashod Bateman
- Gary Baxter
- Odell Beckham Jr.
- Le'Veon Bell
- Tony Bergstrom
- Justin Bethel
- Brennen Beyer
- Christo Bilukidi
- Matt Birk
- Harold Bishop
- Jeff Blackshear
- Jeff Blake
- Chris Board
- Orlando Bobo
- Anquan Boldin
- Kyle Boller
- Terrell Bonds
- Issac Booth
- Peter Boulware
- Luke Bowanko
- Tyus Bowser
- Miles Boykin
- Nick Boyle
- Bradley Bozeman
- Beau Brade
- Bam Bradley
- Donny Brady
- Ben Bredeson
- Dorian Brew
- O. J. Brigance
- Lamont Brightful
- Jason Brookins
- Ethan Brooks
- Nate Brooks
- Terrence Brooks
- Anthony Brown
- Arthur Brown
- Chykie Brown
- Cornell Brown
- Daniel Brown
- Jason Brown
- John Brown
- Marlon Brown
- Marquise Brown
- Omar Brown
- Orlando Brown (born 1970)
- Orlando Brown (born 1996)
- Taven Bryan
- Dez Bryant
- Teddye Buchanan
- Corey Bullock
- Prescott Burgess
- Rob Burnett
- Jeremy Butler
- Earnest Byner
- Josh Bynes
- Shawn Byrdsong

== C ==
- Mike Caldwell
- Michael Campanaro
- Calais Campbell
- Maurice Canady
- Trenton Cannon
- Chris Canty
- James Carpenter
- Brandon Carr
- Chris Carr
- Chris Carter
- Dale Carter
- Stoney Case
- Antoine Cason
- Ben Cavil
- Martin Chase
- Chris Chester
- Dan Chisena
- Chuck Clark
- Dallas Clark
- Sedric Clark
- Jimmy Clausen
- Kaelin Clay
- Mark Clayton
- Ben Cleveland
- Jadeveon Clowney
- Ben Coates
- Dan Cody
- Terrence Cody
- Chris Collier
- Alex Collins
- Ryan Collins
- Trystan Colon
- Sean Considine
- Dalvin Cook
- Damion Cook
- Emanuel Cook
- Bump Cooper
- Brandon Copeland
- Terrance Copper
- Kamalei Correa
- Kenyon Cotton
- Oniel Cousins
- Morgan Cox
- Michael Crabtree
- Aaron Crawford
- Mike Croel
- Sean Culkin
- Billy Cundiff
- Malik Cunningham
- Randall Cunningham

== D ==
- Bernard Dafney
- Lional Dalton
- Eugene Daniel
- Robertson Daniel
- Dexter Daniels
- Owen Daniels
- Ronald Darby
- Devard Darling
- Anthony Davis
- Billy Davis
- Carl Davis
- Mike Davis
- Will Davis
- Greg DeLong
- Will Demps
- Pierre Desir
- Ed Dickson
- Trent Dilfer
- Darnell Dinkins
- Lamar Divens
- Kenneth Dixon
- J. K. Dobbins
- Andrew Donnal
- Khalil Dorsey
- Tandon Doss
- Marques Douglas
- Corey Dowden
- Kenyan Drake
- Shaun Draughn
- Vladimir Ducasse
- Elvis Dumervil
- Devin Duvernay

== E ==
- Dwan Edwards
- Gus Edwards
- Parker Ehinger
- Matt Elam
- Dannell Ellerbe
- Aaron Elling
- DeShon Elliott
- Justin Ellis
- Jermaine Eluemunor
- Gavin Escobar
- Ray Ethridge
- Chuck Evans
- Lee Evans
- Steve Everitt

== F ==
- Daniel Faalele
- Jaylon Ferguson
- Yamon Figurs
- Joe Flacco
- Zay Flowers
- D. J. Fluker
- Mike Flynn
- Spencer Folau
- Dan Footman
- Justin Forsett
- L. J. Fort
- Elliott Fortune
- Domonique Foxworth
- Aubrayo Franklin
- Dominique Franks
- Paul Frase
- Mike Frederick
- Devonta Freeman
- Jonathan Freeny
- Corey Fuller
- Kyle Fuller

== G ==
- Jared Gaither
- Carwell Gardner
- Sam Gash
- Willie Gaston
- K. J. Gerard
- Marcus Gilchrist
- Crockett Gillmore
- Alohi Gilman
- Chris Givens
- Tim Goad
- Leo Goeas
- Keith Goganious
- Tavares Gooden
- Amon Gordon
- Melvin Gordon
- Danny Gorrer
- Gino Gradkowski
- Corey Graham
- Jay Graham
- Shayne Graham
- Janarion Grant
- Hroniss Grasu
- Elvis Grbac
- Eric Green
- Howard Green
- Justin Green
- Mike Green
- Roderick Green
- Kelly Gregg
- Nick Greisen
- Robert Griffin III
- Ben Grubbs
- Andre Gurode
- Lawrence Guy

== H ==
- David Hale
- Dennis Haley
- Bryan Hall
- Adrian Hamilton
- Kyle Hamilton
- Ken Hamlin
- Jim Harbaugh
- Ramon Harewood
- Justin Harper
- Bernardo Harris
- Corey Harris
- Davontae Harris
- Malik Harrison
- Frank Hartley
- Edgerton Hartwell
- Deonte Harty
- Stephen Hauschka
- Daelin Hayes
- Todd Heap
- Dale Hellestrae
- Derrick Henry
- Willie Henry
- Kim Herring
- Devin Hester
- Jay Higgins
- Jaylen Hill
- Justice Hill
- Will Hill
- Leroy Hoard
- Will Holden
- Ka'dar Hollman
- Priest Holmes
- DeAndre Hopkins
- Kevin Houser
- T. J. Houshmandzadeh
- Justin Houston
- DeAndre Houston-Carson
- Austin Howard
- John Hudson
- Marqueston Huff
- Michael Huff
- Jake Hummel
- Marlon Humphrey
- Dameon Hunter
- Earnest Hunter
- Javin Hunter
- Tyler Huntley
- Hayden Hurst
- James Hurst
- Randy Hymes

== I ==
- James Ihedigbo
- Mark Ingram II
- Adisa Isaac
- Andy Isabella
- Sale Isaia
- Qadry Ismail
- Corey Ivy

== J ==
- Asa Jackson
- Bennett Jackson
- Brad Jackson
- DeSean Jackson
- Eddie Jackson
- Keondre Jackson
- Lamar Jackson
- Michael Jackson
- Robert Jackson
- Tramain Jacobs
- Ja'Wuan James
- Robert James
- Stanley Jean-Baptiste
- Tony Jefferson
- DeRon Jenkins
- J. R. Jenkins
- John Jenkins
- Ryan Jensen
- Timmy Jernigan
- Chris Johnson
- Diontae Johnson
- J.R. Johnson
- Jarret Johnson
- Josh Johnson
- Kaleb Johnson
- Kevin Johnson
- Patrick Johnson
- Ron Johnson
- Steven Johnson
- Tim Johnson
- Arthur Jones
- Carl Jones
- Cyrus Jones
- Dre'Mont Jones
- Edgar Jones
- Emery Jones Jr.
- Jacoby Jones
- James Jones
- John Jones
- Josh Jones
- Rondell Jones
- Terry Jones
- Tony Jones
- Travis Jones
- Jaryd Jones-Smith
- Matthew Judon
- Kyle Juszczyk

== K ==
- Sanoussi Kane
- Matt Katula
- Bronson Kaufusi
- John Kelly
- Maʻake Kemoeatu
- Devon Kennard
- Danny Kight
- Brian Kinchen
- Sergio Kindle
- Desmond King
- A. J. Klein
- Tom Knight
- Sam Koch
- Charlie Kolar
- Jeff Kopp
- Mike Kracalik
- Paul Kruger
- William Kwenkeu

== L ==
- Carnell Lake
- Dawan Landry
- Antonio Langham
- Matt Lawrence
- Carl Lawson
- Vonta Leach
- Harper LeBel
- Jim Leonhard
- Anthony Levine
- Mark LeVoir
- Alex Lewis
- Jamal Lewis
- Jermaine Lewis
- Kendrick Lewis
- Ray Lewis
- Chris Lewis-Harris
- Kapron Lewis-Moore
- Isaiah Likely
- Tyler Linderbaum
- Everett Lindsay
- Rhys Lloyd
- Tyler Loop
- Clarence Love
- Reuben Lowery
- Rick Lyle
- Lamar Lyons

== M ==
- Daylon Mack
- Isaiah Mack
- Jeremy Maclin
- Nnamdi Madubuike
- Joe Maese
- Terrence Magee
- Ryan Mallett
- Iman Marshall
- Chandler Martin
- Derrick Martin
- Keyon Martin
- Ben Mason
- Derrick Mason
- Chris Matthews
- Bryan Mattison
- Arthur Maulet
- Vince Mayle
- Chris McAlister
- Bryan McCann
- Jameel McClain
- Le'Ron McClain
- Albert McClellan
- Tyrus McCloud
- Michael McCrary
- Nate McCrary
- Robert McCune
- Kevin McDermott
- Willis McGahee
- Kahlil McKenzie
- Brandon McKinney
- Bryant McKinnie
- Steve McNair
- Pernell McPhee
- Tony McRae
- Trace McSorley
- Steven Means
- Patrick Mekari
- Rashaan Melvin
- Jeromy Miles
- Anthony Miller
- Anthony Mitchell
- Jeff Mitchell
- Keaton Mitchell
- Scott Mitchell
- Zaire Mitchell-Paden
- Tony Moll
- Eugene Monroe
- Greg Montgomery
- Ty Montgomery
- Jeremiah Moon
- Chris Moore
- Clarence Moore
- Nick Moore
- Stevon Moore
- Bam Morris
- Harold Morrow
- Morgan Moses
- C. J. Mosley
- Raheem Mostert
- Ovie Mughelli
- Edwin Mulitalo
- Nick Murphy
- Latavius Murray
- Sam Mustipher

== N ==
- Haruki Nakamura
- Marcus Nash
- Ikechuku Ndukwe
- Lorenzo Neal
- Jim Nelson
- Quentin Neujahr
- Yannick Ngakoue
- Haloti Ngata
- Rayshad Nichols
- Jake Nordin
- Zach Norton
- Joe Noteboom
- David Nugent

== O ==
- A. J. Ofodile
- Cedric Ogbuehi
- Jeff Ogden
- Jonathan Ogden
- Evan Oglesby
- Michael Oher
- David Ojabo
- C. J. Okoye
- Josh Oliver
- Jerry Olsavsky
- Patrick Onwuasor
- Zach Orr
- Amani Oruwariye
- Kelechi Osemele
- Tyler Ott
- Odafe Oweh

== P ==
- J'Vonne Parker
- Riddick Parker
- Jalen Parmele
- Marcus Paschal
- Tony Pashos
- Aeneas Peebles
- Domata Peko
- Breshad Perriman
- Ray Perryman
- Marcus Peters
- Tyrell Peters
- Anwar Phillips
- Del'Shawn Phillips
- Jason Phillips
- Tyre Phillips
- Aaron Pierce
- Bernard Pierce
- Michael Pierce
- Jason Pierre-Paul
- Dennis Pitta
- David Pittman
- Anthony Pleasant
- Anthony Poindexter
- Tony Poljan
- Bernard Pollard
- Tommy Polley
- Tauren Poole
- Alvin Porter
- Roosevelt Potts
- Carl Powell
- Craig Powell
- Ben Powers
- Jerraud Powers
- Sheldon Price
- James Proche
- Ronnie Prude
- Trevor Pryce
- Lovett Purnell

== Q ==
- Patrick Queen

== R ==
- Casey Rabach
- Bobby Rainey
- Cory Redding
- Chris Redman
- David Reed
- Ed Reed
- Jah Reid
- Konrad Reuland
- Errict Rhett
- Alan Ricard
- Patrick Ricard
- Ray Rice
- Jordan Richards
- Kyle Richardson
- Wally Richardson
- Wade Richey
- Brian Rimpf
- Chauncey Rivers
- Seth Roberts
- Demarcus Robinson
- Marcus Robinson
- Tavius Robinson
- James Roe
- Jumal Rolle
- Samari Rolle
- Roger Rosengarten
- Cory Ross
- Jeremy Ross
- Josh Ross
- Cooper Rush

== S ==
- B. J. Sams
- Deion Sanders
- Frank Sanders
- Gerome Sapp
- Patrick Scales
- Matt Schaub
- Bart Scott
- Bernard Scott
- Jaleel Scott
- Kevon Seymour
- David Sharpe
- Shannon Sharpe
- Jamie Sharper
- A. Q. Shipley
- Zach Sieler
- John Simon
- John Simpson
- Trenton Simpson
- Steven Sims
- Nate Singleton
- Tony Siragusa
- Matt Skura
- Chad Slaughter
- T. J. Slaughter
- Andre Smith
- Daryl Smith)
- Fernando Smith
- Jimmy Smith
- L. J. Smith
- Marcus Smith
- Mike Smith
- Musa Smith
- Roquan Smith
- Steve Smith
- Torrey Smith
- Troy Smith
- Za'Darius Smith
- Willie Snead
- Mike Solwold
- Marcus Spears
- Donté Stallworth
- Julian Stanford
- Ronnie Stanley
- Duane Starks
- Malaki Starks
- Ralph Staten
- Brandon Stephens
- Darian Stewart
- Kordell Stewart
- Gary Stills
- Brandon Stokley
- Daren Stone
- Geno Stone
- Jordan Stout
- Matt Stover
- Terrell Suggs
- Phillip Supernaw
- Eddie Sutter
- Harry Swayne
- Quinn Sypniewski
- Thatcher Szalay

== T ==
- Kelly Talavou
- Lorenzo Taliaferro
- T. J. Tampa
- Robert Tate
- Chester Taylor
- Leland Taylor
- Shannon Taylor
- Travis Taylor
- Tyrod Taylor
- Adam Terry
- Vinny Testaverde
- Adalius Thomas
- De'Anthony Thomas
- Earl Thomas
- Jason Thomas
- Joe Thomas
- Bennie Thompson
- Christian Thompson
- Deonte Thompson
- Eric Tomlinson
- Fitzgerald Toussaint
- Johnny Townsend
- James Trapp
- Brynden Trawick
- Laquon Treadwell
- Justin Tucker
- Josh Tupou
- De'Lance Turner
- Eric Turner
- Floyd Turner
- David Tyree
- DeAngelo Tyson

== U ==
- Courtney Upshaw
- Brent Urban
- John Urschel

== V ==
- Kyle Van Noy
- Cassius Vaughn
- Kipp Vickers
- Lee Vickers
- Binjimen Victor
- Alejandro Villanueva
- Keydrick Vincent
- Carson Vinson
- Tony Vinson
- Andrew Vorhees

== W ==
- Reggie Waddell
- Rick Wagner
- Frank Wainright
- Casey Walker
- Devontez Walker
- Frank Walker
- Tray Walker
- Mike Wallace
- Tylan Wallace
- Darren Waller
- Raymond Walls
- B. J. Ward
- Chris Ward
- Dedric Ward
- Jihad Ward
- Ar'Darius Washington
- Broderick Washington
- Fabian Washington
- Keith Washington
- Kelley Washington
- Sammy Watkins
- Benjamin Watson
- Anthony Weaver
- Lardarius Webb
- Raleigh Webb
- Larry Webster
- Eric Weddle
- Kristian Welch
- De'Ondre Wesley
- Terrance West
- LaJohntay Wester
- Chris Westry
- Griff Whalen
- Ernie Wheelwright
- Jamel White
- Tim White
- Tre'Davious White
- Nate Wiggins
- Daniel Wilcox
- Mazzi Wilkins
- Bobbie Williams
- Brandon Williams
- Calvin Williams
- Cary Williams
- Chad Williams
- Chavis Williams
- Damarion Williams
- Darious Williams
- Demetrius Williams
- Erik Williams
- Jerrol Williams
- John Williams
- LaQuan Williams
- Marcus Williams
- Maxx Williams
- Moe Williams
- Ricky Williams
- Sammy Williams
- Tim Williams
- Tramon Williams
- Ty'Son Williams
- Wally Williams
- Matt Willis
- Luke Willson
- Josh Wilson
- Kris Wilson
- Jamaine Winborne
- Derek Wolfe
- Zac Woodfin
- Danny Woodhead
- Rod Woodson
- Daryl Worley
- Chris Wormley
- Anthony Wright
- Owen Wright
- Shareece Wright
- Milton Wynn

== Y ==
- Rock Ya-Sin
- Marshal Yanda
- Ryan Yarborough
- Kenny Young
- Tavon Young

== Z ==
- Dave Zastudil
- Tom Zbikowski
- Eric Zeier
- Kevin Zeitler
- Jeremy Zuttah
