= Baltimore Ravens draft history =

This page is a list of the Baltimore Ravens NFL draft selections. The Ravens franchise began when the Cleveland Browns moved to Baltimore in 1996, leaving their team name, uniforms, and franchise records in Cleveland. The first draft the Ravens participated in was 1996, and they selected offensive tackle Jonathan Ogden of UCLA for their first selection as the Ravens. Their first two selections, Ogden and linebacker Ray Lewis, played their entire careers in Baltimore, and both were inducted into the Pro Football Hall of Fame.

== Key ==
= Pro Bowler
= Hall of Famer

== 1996 draft ==
Round	Pick #	Overall	Name	Position	College
1	4	4	Jonathan Ogden	Offensive tackle	UCLA
1	26	26	Ray Lewis	Linebacker	Miami (FL)
2	25	55	DeRon Jenkins	Cornerback	Tennessee
5	21	153	Jermaine Lewis	Wide receiver	Maryland
6	5	172	Dexter Daniels	Linebacker	Florida
6	19	186	James Roe	Wide receiver	Norfolk State
7	29	238	Jon Stark	Quarterback	Trinity

== 1997 draft ==
Round	Pick #	Overall	Name	Position	College
1	4	4	Peter Boulware	Linebacker	Florida State
2	4	34	Jamie Sharper	Linebacker	Virginia
2	28	58	Kim Herring	Safety	Penn State
3	4	64	Jay Graham	Running back	Tennessee
4	22	118	Tyrus McCloud	Linebacker	Louisville
5	4	134	Jeff Mitchell	Center	Florida
6	4	167	Steve Lee	Running back	Indiana
6	31	194	Cornell Brown	Linebacker	Virginia Tech
7	4	205	Chris Ward	Defensive end	Kentucky
7	33	234	Wally Richardson	Quarterback	Penn State
7	35	236	Ralph Staten	Linebacker	Alabama
7	37	238	Leland Taylor	Defensive tackle	Louisville

== 1998 draft ==
Round	Pick #	Overall	Name	Position	College
1	10	10	Duane Starks	Cornerback	Miami (FL)
2	12	42	Patrick Johnson	Wide receiver	Oregon
5	1	124	Martin Chase	Defensive tackle	Oklahoma
5	10	133	Ryan Sutter	Safety	Colorado
6	1	154	Ron Rogers	Linebacker	Georgia Tech
6	11	164	Sammy Williams	Offensive tackle	Oklahoma
7	52	241	Cam Qualey	Tight end	Weber State

== 1999 draft ==
Round	Pick #	Overall	Name	Position	College
1	10	10	Chris McAlister	Cornerback	Arizona
4	10	105	Brandon Stokley	Wide receiver	Louisiana-Lafayette
4	34	129	Edwin Mulitalo	Guard	Arizona
7	10	216	Anthony Poindexter	Safety	Virginia

== 2000 draft ==
Round	Pick #	Overall	Name	Position	College
1	5	5	Jamal Lewis	Running back	Tennessee
1	10	10	Travis Taylor	Wide receiver	Florida
3	13	75	Chris Redman	Quarterback	Louisville
5	19	148	Richard Mercier	Guard	Miami (FL)
6	20	186	Adalius Thomas	Linebacker	Southern Mississippi
6	25	191	Cedric Woodard	Defensive tackle	Texas

== 2001 draft ==
Round	Pick #	Overall	Name	Position	College
1	31	31	Todd Heap	Tight end	Arizona State
2	31	62	Gary Baxter	Defensive back	Baylor
3	30	92	Casey Rabach	Center	Wisconsin
4	31	126	Edgerton Hartwell	Linebacker	Western Illinois
5	30	161	Chris Barnes	Running back	New Mexico State
6	31	194	Joe Maese	Long snapper	New Mexico
7	31	231	Dwayne Missouri	Defensive end	Northwestern

== 2002 draft ==
Round	Pick #	Overall	Name	Position	College
1	24	24	Ed Reed	Safety	Miami (FL)
2	20	52	Anthony Weaver	Defensive end	Notre Dame
4	14	112	Dave Zastudil	Punter	Ohio
4	25	123	Ron Johnson	Wide receiver	Minnesota
5	20	155	Terry Jones	Tight end	Alabama
6	23	195	Lamont Brightful	Cornerback	Eastern Washington
6	34	206	Javin Hunter	Wide receiver	Notre Dame
6	35	207	Chester Taylor	Running back	Toledo
6	37	209	Chad Williams	Safety	Southern Mississippi
7	25	236	Wes Pate	Quarterback	Stephen F. Austin

== 2003 draft ==
Round	Pick #	Overall	Name	Position	College
1	10	10	Terrell Suggs	Defensive end	Arizona State
1	19	19	Kyle Boller	Quarterback	California
3	13	77	Musa Smith	Running back	Georgia
4	12	109	Jarret Johnson	Linebacker	Alabama
4	37	134	Ovie Mughelli	Fullback	Wake Forest
5	11	146	Aubrayo Franklin	Defensive tackle	Tennessee
5	35	173	Tony Pashos	Offensive tackle	Illinois
6	9	182	Gerome Sapp	Safety	Notre Dame
7	9	223	Trent Smith	Tight end	Oklahoma
7	36	250	Mike Mabry	Center	Central Florida
7	44	258	Antwoine Sanders	Defensive back	Utah

== 2004 draft ==
Round	Pick #	Overall	Name	Position	College
2	19	51	Dwan Edwards	Defensive tackle	Oregon State
3	19	82	Devard Darling	Wide receiver	Washington State
5	21	153	Roderick Green	Linebacker	Central Missouri State
6	22	187	Josh Harris	Quarterback	Bowling Green
6	34	199	Clarence Moore	Wide receiver	Northern Arizona
7	43	244	Derek Abney	Wide receiver	Kentucky
7	43	246	Brian Rimpf	Guard	East Carolina

== 2005 draft ==
Round	Pick #	Overall	Name	Position	College
1	22	22	Mark Clayton	Wide receiver	Oklahoma
2	21	53	Dan Cody	Defensive end	Oklahoma
2	32	64	Adam Terry	Offensive tackle	Syracuse
4	23	124	Jason Brown	Guard	North Carolina
5	22	158	Justin Green	Fullback	Montana
6	39	213	Derek Anderson	Quarterback	Oregon State
7	20	234	Mike Smith	Linebacker	Texas Tech

== 2006 draft ==
Round	Pick #	Overall	Name	Position	College
1	12	12	Haloti Ngata	Defensive tackle	Oregon
2	24	56	Chris Chester	Center	Oklahoma
3	23	87	David Pittman	Cornerback	Northwestern State
4	14	111	Demetrius Williams	Wide receiver	Oregon
4	35	132	P. J. Daniels	Running back	Georgia Tech
5	13	146	Dawan Landry	Safety	Georgia Tech
5	34	166	Quinn Sypniewski	Tight end	Colorado
6	34	203	Sam Koch	Punter	Nebraska
6	39	208	Derrick Martin	Cornerback	Wyoming
7	11	219	Ryan LaCasse	Linebacker	Syracuse

== 2007 draft ==
Round	Pick #	Overall	Name	Position	College
1	29	29	Ben Grubbs	Guard	Auburn
3	10	74	Yamon Figurs	Wide receiver	Kansas State
3	23	86	Marshal Yanda	Offensive tackle	Iowa
4	35	134	Antwan Barnes	Linebacker	Florida International
4	38	137	Le'Ron McClain	Fullback	Alabama
5	37	174	Troy Smith	Quarterback	Ohio State
6	33	207	Prescott Burgess	Linebacker	Michigan

== 2008 draft ==
Round	Pick #	Overall	Name	Position	College
1	18	18	Joe Flacco	Quarterback	Delaware
2	24	55	Ray Rice	Running back	Rutgers
3	8	71	Tavares Gooden	Linebacker	Miami (FL)
3	23	86	Tom Zbikowski	Safety	Notre Dame
3	36	99	Oniel Cousins	Guard	UTEP
4	7	106	Marcus Smith	Wide receiver	New Mexico
4	34	133	David Hale	Offensive tackle	Weber State
6	40	206	Haruki Nakamura	Safety	Cincinnati
7	8	215	Justin Harper	Wide receiver	Virginia Tech
7	33	240	Allen Patrick	Running back	Oklahoma

== 2009 draft ==
Round	Pick #	Overall	Name	Position	College
1	23	23	Michael Oher	Offensive tackle	Mississippi
2	25	57	Paul Kruger	Defensive end	Utah
3	24	88	Lardarius Webb	Cornerback	Nicholls State
5	1	137	Jason Phillips	Linebacker	Texas Christian
5	13	149	Davon Drew	Tight end	East Carolina
6	12	185	Cedric Peerman	Running back	Virginia

== 2010 draft ==
Round	Pick #	Overall	Name	Position	College
2	11	43	Sergio Kindle	Linebacker	Texas
2	25	57	Terrence Cody	Defensive tackle	Alabama
3	6	70	Ed Dickson	Tight end	Oregon
4	16	114	Dennis Pitta	Tight end	BYU
5	25	156	David Reed	Wide receiver	Utah
5	26	157	Arthur Jones	Defensive tackle	Syracuse
6	25	194	Ramon Harewood	Offensive tackle	Morehouse

== 2011 draft ==
Round	Pick #	Overall	Name	Position	College
1	27	27	Jimmy Smith	Cornerback	Colorado
2	26	58	Torrey Smith	Wide receiver	Maryland
3	21	85	Jah Reid	Offensive tackle	Central Florida
4	26	123	Tandon Doss	Wide receiver	Indiana
5	33	164	Chykie Brown	Cornerback	Texas
5	34	165	Pernell McPhee	Defensive end	Mississippi State
6	15	180	Tyrod Taylor	Quarterback	Virginia Tech
7	22	225	Anthony Allen	Running back	Georgia Tech

== 2012 draft ==
Round	Pick #	Overall	Name	Position	College
2	3	35	Courtney Upshaw	Linebacker	Alabama
2	28	60	Kelechi Osemele	Offensive tackle	Iowa State
3	21	84	Bernard Pierce	Running back	Temple
4	3	98	Gino Gradkowski	Guard	Delaware
4	35	130	Christian Thompson	Safety	South Carolina State
5	34	169	Asa Jackson	Cornerback	Cal Poly
6	28	198	Tommy Streeter	Wide receiver	Miami (FL)
7	29	236	DeAngelo Tyson	Defensive end	Georgia

== 2013 draft ==
Round	Pick #	Overall	Name	Position	College
1	32	32	Matt Elam	Safety	Florida
2	24	56	Arthur Brown	Linebacker	Kansas State
3	32	94	Brandon Williams	Defensive tackle	Missouri Southern State
4	32	129	John Simon	Defensive end	Ohio State
4	33	130	Kyle Juszczyk	Fullback	Harvard
5	35	168	Ricky Wagner	Offensive tackle	Wisconsin
6	32	200	Kapron Lewis-Moore	Defensive end	Notre Dame
6	35	203	Ryan Jensen	Offensive center	Colorado State-Pueblo
7	32	238	Aaron Mellette	Wide receiver	Elon
7	41	247	Marc Anthony	Cornerback	California

== 2014 draft ==
Round	Pick #	Overall	Name	Position	College
1	17	17	C. J. Mosley	Linebacker	Alabama
2	16	48	Timmy Jernigan	Defensive tackle	Florida State
3	15	79	Terrence Brooks	Safety	Florida State
3	35	99	Crockett Gillmore	Tight end	Colorado State
4	34	134	Brent Urban	Defensive tackle	Virginia
4	38	138	Lorenzo Taliaferro	Running back	Coastal Carolina
5	35	175	John Urschel	Guard	Penn State
6	18	194	Keith Wenning	Quarterback	Ball State
7	3	218	Michael Campanaro	Wide receiver	Wake Forest

== 2015 draft ==
Round	Pick #	Overall	Name	Position	College
1	26	26	Breshad Perriman	Wide receiver	Central Florida
2	23	55	Maxx Williams	Tight end	Minnesota
3	26	90	Carl Davis	Defensive tackle	Iowa
4	23	122	Za'Darius Smith	Defensive end	Kentucky
4	26	125	Javorius Allen	Running back	USC
4	37	136	Tray Walker	Cornerback	Texas Southern
5	35	171	Nick Boyle	Tight end	Delaware
5	40	176	Robert Myers	Guard	Tennessee State
6	28	204	Darren Waller	Wide receiver	Georgia Tech

== 2016 draft ==
Round	Pick #	Overall	Name	Position	College
1	6	6	Ronnie Stanley	Offensive tackle	Notre Dame
2	11	42	Kamalei Correa	Linebacker	Boise State
3	7	70	Bronson Kaufusi	Defensive end	BYU
4	6	104	Tavon Young	Cornerback	Temple
4	9	107	Chris Moore	Wide receiver	Cincinnati
4	32	130	Alex Lewis	Offensive tackle	Nebraska
4	34	132	Willie Henry	Defensive tackle	Michigan
4	36	134	Kenneth Dixon	Running back	Louisiana Tech
5	7	146	Matthew Judon	Defensive end	Grand Valley State
6	7	182	Keenan Reynolds	Running back	Navy
6	34	209	Maurice Canady	Cornerback	Virginia

== 2017 draft ==
Round	Pick #	Overall	Name	Position	College
1	16	16	Marlon Humphrey	Cornerback	Alabama
2	15	47	Tyus Bowser	Linebacker	Houston
3	10	74	Chris Wormley	Defensive end	Michigan
3	14	78	Tim Williams	Linebacker	Alabama
4	16	122	Nico Siragusa	Guard	San Diego State
5	15	159	Jermaine Eluemunor	Guard	Texas A&M
6	2	186	Chuck Clark	Defensive back	Virginia Tech

== 2018 draft ==
Round	Pick #	Overall	Name	Position	College
1	25	25	Hayden Hurst	Tight end	South Carolina
1	32	32	Lamar Jackson	Quarterback	Louisville
3	19	83	Orlando Brown Jr.	Offensive tackle	Oklahoma
3	22	86	Mark Andrews	Tight end	Oklahoma
4	18	118	Anthony Averett	Cornerback	Alabama
4	22	122	Kenny Young	Linebacker	UCLA
4	32	132	Jaleel Scott	Wide receiver	New Mexico State
5	25	162	Jordan Lasley	Wide receiver	UCLA
6	16	190	DeShon Elliott	Safety	Texas
6	38	212	Greg Senat	Offensive tackle	Wagner
6	41	215	Bradley Bozeman	Center	Alabama
7	20	238	Zach Sieler	Defensive end	Ferris State

== 2019 draft ==
Round	Pick #	Overall	Name	Position	College
1	25	25	Marquise Brown	Wide receiver	Oklahoma
3	22	85	Jaylon Ferguson	Defensive end	Louisiana Tech
3	30	93	Miles Boykin	Wide receiver	Notre Dame
4	11	113	Justice Hill	Running back	Oklahoma State
4	21	123	Ben Powers	Guard	Oklahoma
4	25	127	Iman Marshall	Cornerback	USC
5	22	160	Daylon Mack	Defensive tackle	Texas A&M
6	25	197	Trace McSorley	Quarterback	Penn State

== 2020 draft ==
Round	Pick #	Overall	Name	Position	College
1	28	28	Patrick Queen	Linebacker	LSU
2	23	55	J. K. Dobbins	Running back	Ohio State
3	7	71	Justin Madubuike	Defensive tackle	Texas A&M
3	28	92	Devin Duvernay	Wide receiver	Texas
3	34	98	Malik Harrison	Linebacker	Ohio State
3	42	106	Tyre Phillips	Offensive tackle	Mississippi State
4	37	143	Ben Bredeson	Guard	Michigan
5	25	170	Broderick Washington Jr.	Defensive tackle	Texas Tech
6	22	201	James Proche	Wide receiver	SMU
7	5	219	Geno Stone	Safety	Iowa

== 2021 draft ==
Round	Pick #	Overall	Name	Position	College
1	27	27	Rashod Bateman	Wide receiver	Minnesota
1	31	31	Odafe Oweh	Defensive end	Penn State
3	31	94	Ben Cleveland	Guard	Georgia
3	41	104	Brandon Stephens	Cornerback	SMU
4	26	131	Tylan Wallace	Wide receiver	Oklahoma State
5	16	160	Shaun Wade	Cornerback	Ohio State
5	27	171	Daelin Hayes	Defensive end	Notre Dame
5	40	184	Ben Mason	Fullback	Michigan

== 2022 draft ==
Round	Pick #	Overall	Name	Position	College
1	14	14	Kyle Hamilton	Safety	Notre Dame
1	25	25	Tyler Linderbaum	Center	Iowa
2	13	45	David Ojabo	Linebacker	Michigan
3	12	76	Travis Jones	Defensive tackle	UConn
4	5	110	Daniel Faalele	Offensive tackle	Minnesota
4	14	119	Jalyn Armour-Davis	Cornerback	Alabama
4	23	128	Charlie Kolar	Tight end	Iowa State
4	25	130	Jordan Stout	Punter	Penn State
4	34	139	Isaiah Likely	Tight end	Coastal Carolina
4	36	141	Damarion Williams	Cornerback	Houston
6	18	196	Tyler Badie	Running back	Missouri

== 2023 draft ==
Round	Pick #	Overall	Name	Position	College
1	22	22	Zay Flowers	Wide receiver	Boston College
3	23	86	Trenton Simpson	Linebacker	Clemson
4	22	124	Tavius Robinson	Defensive end	Ole Miss
5	22	157	Kyu Blu Kelly	Cornerback	Stanford
6	22	199	Malaesala Aumavae–Laulu	Offensive tackle	Oregon
7	12	229	Andrew Vorhees	Guard	USC

== 2024 draft ==
Round	Pick #	Overall	Name	Position	College
1	30	30	Nate Wiggins	Cornerback	Clemson
2	30	62	Roger Rosengarten	Offensive tackle	Washington
3	30	93	Adisa Isaac	Defensive end	Penn State
4	13	113	Devontez Walker	Wide receiver	North Carolina
4	30	130	T. J. Tampa	Cornerback	Iowa State
5	30	165	Rasheen Ali	Running back	Marshall
6	42	218	Devin Leary	Quarterback	Kentucky
7	8	228	Nick Samac	Center	Michigan State
7	30	250	Sanoussi Kane	Safety	Purdue

== 2025 draft ==
Round	Pick #	Overall	Name	Position	College
1	27	27	Malaki Starks	Safety	Georgia
2	27	59	Mike Green	Defensive end	Marshall
3	27	91	Emery Jones	Guard	LSU
4	27	129	Teddye Buchanan	Linebacker	California
5	3	141	Carson Vinson	Offensive tackle	Alabama A&M
6	2	178	Bilhal Kone	Cornerback	Western Michigan
6	10	186	Tyler Loop	Kicker	Arizona
6	27	203	LaJohntay Wester	Wide receiver	Colorado
6	34	210	Aeneas Peebles	Defensive tackle	Virginia Tech
6	36	212	Robert Longerbeam	Cornerback	Rutgers
7	27	243	Garrett Dellinger	Guard	LSU

== 2026 draft ==
Round	Pick #	Overall	Name	Position	College
1	14	14	Vega Ioane	Guard	Penn State
2	13	45	Zion Young	Defensive end	Missouri
3	16	80	Ja'Kobi Lane	Wide receiver	USC
4	15	115	Elijah Sarratt	Wide receiver	Indiana
4	33	133	Matthew Hibner	Tight end	SMU
5	22	162	Chandler Rivers	Cornerback	Duke
5	33	173	Josh Cuevas	Tight end	Alabama
5	34	174	Adam Randall	Running back	Clemson
6	30	211	Ryan Eckley	Punter	Michigan State
7	34	250	Rayshaun Benny	Defensive tackle	Michigan
7	37	253	Evan Beerntsen	Guard	Northwestern

== See also ==
- History of the Baltimore Ravens
- List of Baltimore Ravens first-round draft picks
- List of professional American football drafts
