= 1997 Baltimore Ravens season =

NFL team season

- Owner: Art Modell
- Head coach: Ted Marchibroda
- Defensive coordinator: Marvin Lewis
- Home stadium: Memorial Stadium

Results
- Record: 6–9–1
- Division place: 5th AFC Central
- Playoffs: Did not qualify
- Pro Bowlers: LT Jonathan Ogden; LB Ray Lewis

The 1997 season was the Baltimore Ravens’ second season in the National Football League (NFL) and second under coach Ted Marchibroda. While Baltimore failed to finish above 5th in the AFC Central, they improved from 4–12 in 1996 to 6–9–1. It would be the final season they finished at the bottom of their division for 10 years.

The Ravens updated their uniforms with a new style of numbers featuring a shadow in the back. White pants were introduced for use with home jerseys, while the black pants continued to be worn on the road.

This was the final NFL season played in Baltimore’s Memorial Stadium.

== Offseason ==
=== NFL draft ===
1997 Baltimore Ravens draft
Round	Pick	Player	Position	College	Notes
1	4	Peter Boulware *	Linebacker	Florida State	
2	34	Jamie Sharper	Linebacker	Virginia	
2	58	Kim Herring	Safety	Penn State	
3	64	Jay Graham	Running back	Tennessee	
4	118	Tyrus McCloud	Linebacker	Louisville	
5	134	Jeff Mitchell	Center	Florida	
6	167	Steve Lee	Running back	Indiana	
6	194	Cornell Brown	Linebacker	Virginia Tech	
7	205	Chris Ward	Defensive end	Kentucky	
7	234	Wally Richardson	Quarterback	Penn State	
7	236	Ralph Staten	Safety	Alabama	
7	238	Leland Taylor	Defensive tackle	Louisville	
Made roster * Made at least one Pro Bowl during career

=== Undrafted free agents ===
1997 undrafted free agents of note
Player	Position	College
Mike Flynn	Center	Maine
Priest Holmes	Running back	Texas

== Personnel ==
=== Staff / Coaches ===
1997 Baltimore Ravens staff
Front office: Owner and president – Art Modell; Vice-president of player personnel – Ozzie Newsome; Director of college scouting – Phil Savage; Director of pro personnel – James Harris; Head coaches: Head coach – Ted Marchibroda; Assistant head coach/offensive line – Kirk Ferentz; Offensive coaches: Quarterbacks – Don Strock; Running backs – Al Lavan; Wide receivers – Richard Mann; Tight ends – Ken Whisenhunt; Offensive assistant – John Settle; Offensive quality control – Lester Erb	Defensive coaches: Defensive coordinator – Marvin Lewis; Defensive line – Jacob Burney; Linebackers – Maxie Baughan; Secondary – Alvin Reynolds; Defensive assistant/quality control – Jim Schwartz; Special teams coaches: Special teams – Scott O'Brien; Strength and conditioning: Head athletic trainer – Bill Tessendorf; Strength and conditioning – Jerry Simmons

=== Roster ===
1997 Baltimore Ravens roster
Quarterbacks (QB): 14 Wally Richardson; 12 Vinny Testaverde; 10 Eric Zeier; Running backs (RB): 21 Earnest Byner; 40 Kenyon Cotton FB; 34 Jay Graham; 33 Priest Holmes; 33 Bam Morris FB; 44 Tony Vinson FB; Wide receivers (WR): 82 Derrick Alexander; 81 Michael Jackson; 84 Jermaine Lewis; 83 James Roe; 80 Ryan Yarborough; Tight ends (TE): 86 Eric Green; 88 Brian Kinchen LS; 89 A. J. Ofodile	Offensive linemen (OL): 76 Alex Bernstein G; 69 Jeff Blackshear G; 77 Orlando Brown T; 65 Ben Cavil G; 72 Mike Flynn G; 71 Spencer Folau T; 67 Quentin Neujahr C; 75 Jonathan Ogden T; 63 Wally Williams C; Defensive linemen (DL): 90 Rob Burnett DE; 94 Mike Frederick DE; 97 James Jones DT; 99 Michael McCrary DE; 98 Tony Siragusa DT; 95 Chris Ward DE; 93 Keith Washington DE; 79 Larry Webster DT	Linebackers (LB): 58 Peter Boulware OLB; 51 Cornell Brown OLB; 52 Ray Lewis MLB; 54 Tyrus McCloud MLB; 53 Tyrell Peters OLB; 55 Jamie Sharper OLB; Defensive backs (DB): 24 Donny Brady CB; 30 Eugene Daniel CB; 20 Kim Herring FS; 25 DeRon Jenkins CB; 31 Rondell Jones FS; 38 Antonio Langham CB; 29 Lamar Lyons S; 27 Stevon Moore SS; 41 Ralph Staten SS; 37 Bennie Thompson SS; 36 John Williams CB; Special teams (ST): 9 Greg Montgomery P; 3 Matt Stover K	Practice squad: 13 Donald Richard WR; -- Dwaine Robinson DT; 74 Robert Walker DT; Reserve: 16 Eddie Britton WR (IR); 85 Ray Ethridge WR (IR); 62 Leo Goeas G (IR); 64 Sale Isaia G (IR); 60 Jeff Mitchell C (IR); 87 Nate Singleton WR (IR); 92 Leland Taylor DT (IR); 53 active, 7 inactive, 3 practice squad Rookies in italics

== Preseason ==
=== Schedule ===
Week	Date	Opponent	Result	Record	Venue
1	August 2	New York Giants	L 20–21	0–1	Memorial Stadium
2	August 8	at New York Jets	L 29–39	0–2	Giants Stadium
3	August 16	at Philadelphia Eagles	L 13–24	0–3	Veterans Stadium
4	August 22	Buffalo Bills	L 28–31	0–4	Memorial Stadium

== Regular season ==
=== Schedule ===
Week	Date	Opponent	Result	Record	Venue	Attendance
1	August 31	**Jacksonville Jaguars**	**L** 27–28	0–1	Memorial Stadium	61,018
2	September 7	**Cincinnati Bengals**	**W** 23–10	1–1	Memorial Stadium	52,968
3	September 14	at New York Giants	**W** 24–23	2–1	Giants Stadium	69,768
4	September 21	at **Tennessee Oilers**	**W** 36–10	3–1	Liberty Bowl Memorial Stadium	17,737
5	September 28	at San Diego Chargers	**L** 17–21	3–2	Qualcomm Stadium	54,094
6	October 5	**Pittsburgh Steelers**	**L** 34–42	3–3	Memorial Stadium	64,421
7	Bye					
8	October 19	Miami Dolphins	**L** 13–24	3–4	Memorial Stadium	64,354
9	October 26	at Washington Redskins	**W** 20–17	4–4	Jack Kent Cooke Stadium	75,067
10	November 2	at New York Jets	**L** 16–19 (OT)	4–5	Giants Stadium	59,524
11	November 9	at **Pittsburgh Steelers**	**L** 0–37	4–6	Three Rivers Stadium	56,669
12	November 16	Philadelphia Eagles	**T** 10–10 (OT)	4–6–1	Memorial Stadium	63,546
13	November 23	Arizona Cardinals	**L** 13–16	4–7–1	Memorial Stadium	53,976
14	November 30	at **Jacksonville Jaguars**	**L** 27–29	4–8–1	Jacksonville Municipal Stadium	63,712
15	December 7	Seattle Seahawks	**W** 31–24	5–8–1	Memorial Stadium	54,395
16	December 14	**Tennessee Oilers**	**W** 21–19	6–8–1	Memorial Stadium	60,558
17	December 21	at **Cincinnati Bengals**	**L** 14–16	6–9–1	Cinergy Field	50,917
Note: Intra-division opponents are in **bold** text.

=== Standings ===
AFC Central
	W	L	T	PCT	PF	PA	STK
^{(2)} Pittsburgh Steelers	11	5	0	.688	372	307	L1
^{(5)} Jacksonville Jaguars	11	5	0	.688	394	318	W2
Tennessee Oilers	8	8	0	.500	333	310	W1
Cincinnati Bengals	7	9	0	.438	355	405	W3
Baltimore Ravens	6	9	1	.406	326	345	L1
