= 1998 Baltimore Ravens season =

NFL team season

- Owner: Art Modell
- Head coach: Ted Marchibroda
- Home stadium: Ravens Stadium at Camden Yards

Results
- Record: 6–10
- Division place: 4th AFC Central
- Playoffs: Did not qualify
- Pro Bowlers: T Jonathan Ogden; LB Ray Lewis; LB Peter Boulware; RS Jermaine Lewis; DE Michael McCrary; S Bennie Thompson

The 1998 season was the Baltimore Ravens' third season in the National Football League (NFL) and the last of Ted Marchibroda's three-year tenure as head coach of the organization. This was the Ravens' first year playing at Ravens Stadium at Camden Yards, now known as M&T Bank Stadium.

The season also included a November 29 visit from the city's former team, the Colts, for the first time since their controversial relocation in 1984.

After the season, Donny Brady retired after being with the team since their time as the Cleveland Browns. He later returned to the Canadian Football League, playing from 2002–2006.

== Offseason ==
=== NFL draft ===
1998 Baltimore Ravens draft
Round	Pick	Player	Position	College	Notes
1	10	Duane Starks	Cornerback	Miami (FL)	
2	42	Patrick Johnson	Wide receiver	Oregon	
5	124	Martin Chase	Defensive tackle	Oklahoma	
5	133	Ryan Sutter	Safety	Colorado	
6	154	Ron Rogers	Linebacker	Georgia Tech	
6	164	Sammy Williams	Offensive tackle	Oklahoma	
7	241	Cam Quayle	Tight end	Weber State	
Made roster

=== Undrafted free agents ===
1998 undrafted free agents of note
Player	Position	College
Jeff Saturday	Center	North Carolina

== Personnel ==
=== Staff / Coaches ===
1998 Baltimore Ravens staff
Front office: Owner and president – Art Modell; Vice-president of player personnel – Ozzie Newsome; Director of college scouting – Phil Savage; Director of pro personnel – James Harris; Personnel assistant – Joe Hortiz; Head coaches: Head coach – Ted Marchibroda; Assistant head coach/offense – Kirk Ferentz; Offensive coaches: Quarterbacks – Don Strock; Running backs – Al Lavan; Wide receivers – Richard Mann; Tight ends – Ken Whisenhunt; Quality control/offense – Lester Erb	Defensive coaches: Defensive coordinator – Marvin Lewis; Defensive line – Jacob Burney; Linebackers – Maxie Baughan; Defensive backs – Alvin Reynolds; Quality control/defense – Jim Schwartz; Special teams coaches: Special teams – Scott O'Brien; Quality control/special teams – Darrin Simmons; Strength and conditioning: Strength and conditioning – Jerry Simmons

=== Roster ===
1998 Baltimore Ravens roster
Quarterbacks (QB): 4 Jim Harbaugh; 14 Wally Richardson; 10 Eric Zeier; Running backs (RB): 23 Kenyon Cotton FB; 33 Priest Holmes; 32 Errict Rhett; 42 Roosevelt Potts FB; Wide receivers (WR): 81 Michael Jackson; 85 Patrick Johnson KR; 84 Jermaine Lewis; 83 James Roe PR; 87 Floyd Turner; Tight ends (TE): 86 Eric Green; 88 Brian Kinchen LS; 89 A. J. Ofodile	Offensive linemen (OL): 74 James Atkins G/T; 69 Jeff Blackshear G; 77 Orlando Brown T; 65 Ben Cavil G; 62 Mike Flynn C/G; 71 Spencer Folau T; 60 Jeff Mitchell C; 75 Jonathan Ogden T; 63 Wally Williams C/G; Defensive linemen (DL): 90 Rob Burnett DE; 91 Lional Dalton DT; 78 Larry Fitzpatrick DT; 95 Paul Frase DE/DT; 94 Mike Frederick DE/DT; 97 James Jones DT; 99 Michael McCrary DE; 98 Tony Siragusa DT; 93 Keith Washington DE; 79 Larry Webster DT	Linebackers (LB): 58 Peter Boulware OLB; 51 Cornell Brown OLB; 50 Brad Jackson OLB; 57 Jeff Kopp OLB; 52 Ray Lewis MLB; 56 Jerry Olsavsky MLB; 53 Tyrell Peters OLB; 55 Jamie Sharper OLB; Defensive backs (DB): 24 Donny Brady CB; 45 Corey Harris; 25 DeRon Jenkins CB; 27 Stevon Moore SS; 22 Duane Starks CB; 41 Ralph Staten FS; 37 Bennie Thompson SS; 36 John Williams CB; 26 Rod Woodson CB; Special teams (ST): 5 Kyle Richardson P; 3 Matt Stover K	Practice squad: 16 Mike Bowman WR; 96 Chuck Darby DT; 68 Brandon Dyson C; 67 Dwaine Robinson DT; 17 Phil Savoy WR; Reserve: 92 Martin Chase DT (IR); 34 Jay Graham RB (IR); 20 Kim Herring S (IR); 64 Sale Isaia G (IR); 82 Harper LeBel (IR); 54 Tyrus McCloud LB (IR); 61 Kareem Robinson DE (IR); 44 Tony Vinson RB (IR); 72 Sammy Williams T (IR); 53 active, 9 inactive, 5 practice squad Rookies in italics

== Preseason ==
=== Schedule ===
Week	Date	Opponent	Result	Record
1	August 8	Chicago Bears	W 19–14	1–0
2	August 15	at New York Jets	W 33–0	2–0
3	August 24	Philadelphia Eagles	W 23–6	3–0
4	August 28	at New York Giants	W 10–6	4–0

== Regular season ==
=== Schedule ===
Week	Date	Opponent	Result	Record	Venue	Attendance
1	September 6	**Pittsburgh Steelers**	**L** 13–20	0–1	Ravens Stadium at Camden Yards	68,847
2	September 13	at New York Jets	**W** 24–10	1–1	Giants Stadium	70,063
3	September 20	at **Jacksonville Jaguars**	**L** 10–24	1–2	Jacksonville Municipal Stadium	67,069
4	September 27	**Cincinnati Bengals**	**W** 31–24	2–2	Ravens Stadium at Camden Yards	68,154
5	Bye					
6	October 11	**Tennessee Oilers**	**L** 8–12	2–3	Ravens Stadium at Camden Yards	68,561
7	October 18	at **Pittsburgh Steelers**	**L** 6–16	2–4	Three Rivers Stadium	58,620
8	October 25	at Green Bay Packers	**L** 10–28	2–5	Lambeau Field	59,860
9	November 1	**Jacksonville Jaguars**	**L** 19–45	2–6	Ravens Stadium at Camden Yards	68,915
10	November 8	Oakland Raiders	**W** 13–10	3–6	Ravens Stadium at Camden Yards	69,037
11	November 15	at San Diego Chargers	**L** 13–14	3–7	Qualcomm Stadium	54,388
12	November 22	at **Cincinnati Bengals**	**W** 20–13	4–7	Cinergy Field	52,571
13	November 29	Indianapolis Colts	**W** 38–31	5–7	Ravens Stadium at Camden Yards	68,898
14	December 6	at **Tennessee Oilers**	**L** 14–16	5–8	Vanderbilt Stadium	31,124
15	December 13	Minnesota Vikings	**L** 28–38	5–9	Ravens Stadium at Camden Yards	69,074
16	December 20	at Chicago Bears	**L** 3–24	5–10	Soldier Field	40,853
17	December 27	Detroit Lions	**W** 19–10	6–10	Ravens Stadium at Camden Yards	68,045
Note: Intra-division opponents are in **bold** text.

=== Standings ===
AFC Central
	W	L	T	PCT	PF	PA	STK
^{(3)} Jacksonville Jaguars	11	5	0	.688	392	338	W1
Tennessee Oilers	8	8	0	.500	330	320	L2
Pittsburgh Steelers	7	9	0	.438	263	303	L5
Baltimore Ravens	6	10	0	.375	269	335	W1
Cincinnati Bengals	3	13	0	.188	268	452	L1

== Milestones ==
- This was the Ravens' first season at Ravens Stadium at Camden Yards (now M&T Bank Stadium)
