= Michael McCrary =

American football player (born 1970)

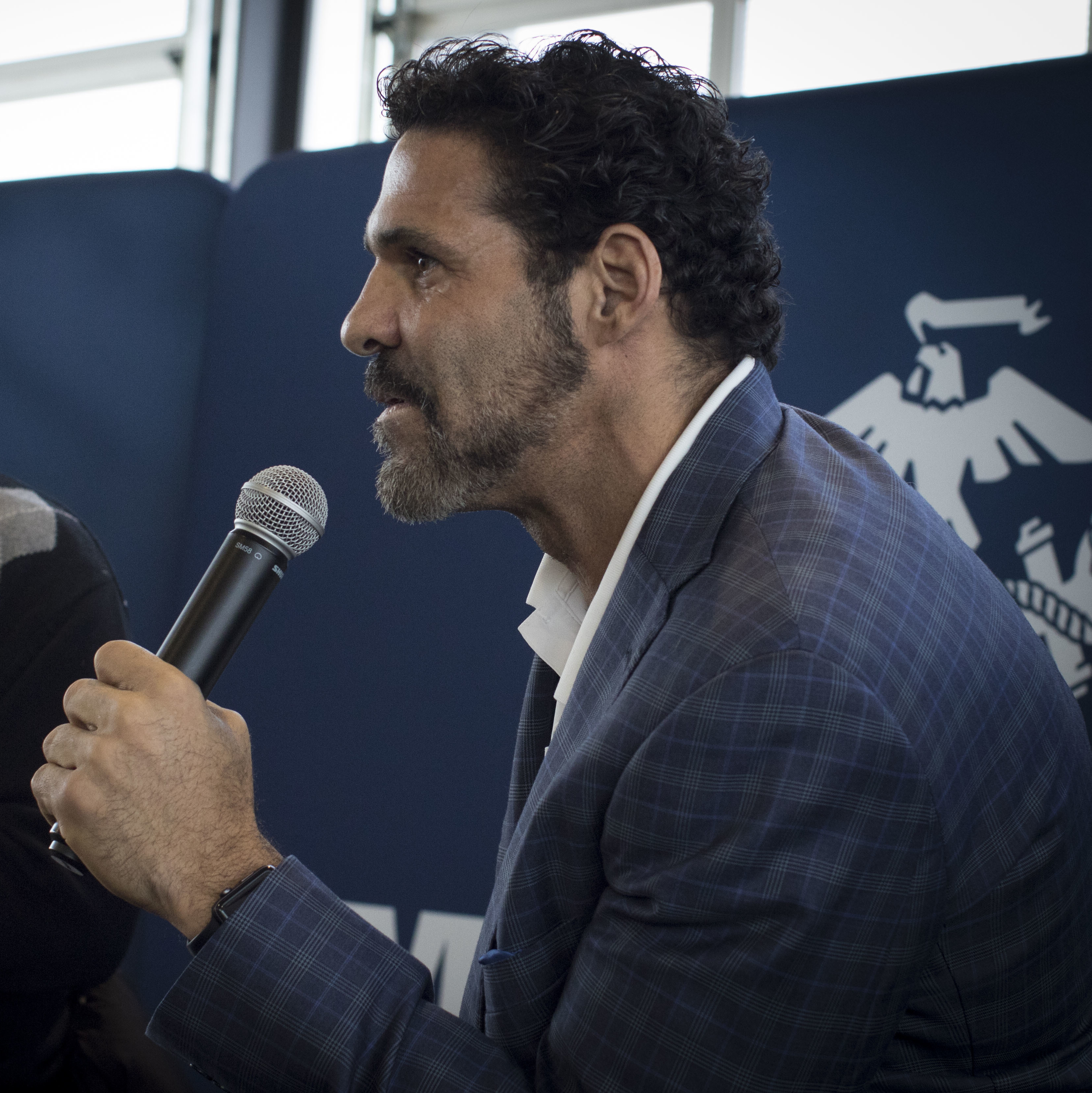
- McCrary in Baltimore in 2017

No. 75, 99
- Position: Defensive end

Personal information
- Born: July 7, 1970 (age 56); Vienna, Virginia, U.S.
- Listed height: 6 ft 4 in (1.93 m)
- Listed weight: 260 lb (118 kg)

Career information
- High school: George C. Marshall (Falls Church, Virginia)
- College: Wake Forest
- NFL draft: 1993: 7th round, 170th overall pick

Career history
- Seattle Seahawks (1993–1996); Baltimore Ravens (1997–2002)

Awards and highlights
- Super Bowl champion (XXXV); 2× Pro Bowl (1998, 1999); "Whizzer" White NFL Man of the Year (2000); Baltimore Ravens Ring of Honor; Second-team All-ACC (1992)

Career NFL statistics
- Tackles: 403
- Sacks: 71
- Interceptions: 1
- Stats at Pro Football Reference

Michael Curtis McCrary (born July 7, 1970) is an American former professional football player who was a defensive end for ten seasons with the Seattle Seahawks and the Baltimore Ravens of the National Football League (NFL) between 1993 and 2002. McCrary was a two-time Pro Bowler in 1998 and 1999. McCrary was inducted to the Ravens Ring of Honor in 2004. McCrary is now doing commentary for the Ravens on WBAL-AM.

== Early life ==
When McCrary was a young boy his mother wanted to place him in a day care which was located across the street from his home. However, it wasn't racially integrated and she sued the day care to allow Michael's admittance. The case went to the United States Supreme Court Runyon v. McCrary in 1976. One of the justices who dissented was former football star Byron "Whizzer" White; a quarter-century later, in 2000, McCrary won the Byron "Whizzer" White NFL Man of the Year Award. He later attended George C. Marshall High School in Fairfax County, Virginia.

== College career ==
McCrary played college football at Wake Forest University from 1989 to 1992, setting school records for sacks in a season (16) and in a career (30), records he still holds.

When being scouted by NFL scouts they found his vertical leap was measured at 36 inches; and at 250 pounds, he came in at 4.59 seconds in the 40-yard sprint.

== Professional career ==
McCrary was drafted in the seventh round by the Seattle Seahawks in the 1993 NFL draft. He spent four seasons as a defensive end as well as playing on special teams before signing with Baltimore following the 1996 season.

McCrary started all 16 games with the Ravens at defensive end during the 1998 season. That season, he led the team in quarterback sacks, and he finished second on the team in tackles. He was elected to the Pro Bowl along with five other Ravens' teammates, Bennie Thompson, Peter Boulware, Jermaine Lewis, Ray Lewis, and Jonathan Ogden.

In 1999, he again started all 16 games for the Ravens, and was elected to his second Pro Bowl. The following season, McCrary would again start all 16 games as the Ravens would have one of the greatest statistical defenses in NFL history, finishing 12-4 and allowing an NFL record 10.3 points per game. In the playoffs, McCrary would have 6 sacks, including 2 in Super Bowl XXXV, which McCrary and the Ravens won 34–7.

Due to various injuries, McCrary retired in August 2003, ending his stint with the Ravens. McCrary finished 2nd on franchise sack list with 51 sacks, now 3rd behind Terrell Suggs (125 QB sacks) and Peter Boulware (70 QB sacks).

== NFL career statistics ==
Legend
	Won the Super Bowl
	Led the league
**Bold**	Career high

=== Regular season ===
Year	Team	Games		Tackles					Fumbles				Interceptions					
Year	Team	GP	GS	Cmb	Solo	Ast	Sck	Sfty	FF	FR	Yds	TD	Int	Yds	Avg	Lng	TD	PD
1993	SEA	15	0	8	0	0	4.0	0	**2**	0	0	0	0	0	0.0	0	0	0
1994	SEA	16	0	11	9	2	1.5	0	0	0	0	0	0	0	0.0	0	0	0
1995	SEA	11	0	9	7	2	1.0	0	0	0	0	0	0	0	0.0	0	0	0
1996	SEA	16	13	**76**	57	**19**	13.5	0	1	1	0	0	0	0	0.0	0	0	0
1997	BAL	15	15	69	56	13	9.0	0	1	2	0	0	0	0	0.0	0	0	0
1998	BAL	16	16	72	**66**	6	**14.5**	0	1	0	0	0	0	0	0.0	0	0	0
1999	BAL	16	16	58	43	15	11.5	0	1	1	0	0	0	0	0.0	0	0	2
2000	BAL	16	16	44	35	9	6.5	**1**	1	**3**	0	0	0	0	0.0	0	0	**3**
2001	BAL	10	10	51	34	17	7.5	0	0	0	0	0	**1**	**1**	**1.0**	**1**	0	1
2002	BAL	5	2	5	3	2	2.0	0	0	0	0	0	0	0	0.0	0	0	1
Career		136	88	403	310	85	71.0	1	7	7	0	0	1	1	1.0	1	0	7
