= Byrdsong =

Byrdsong is a surname. Notable people with the surname include:

- Ricky Byrdsong (1956–1999), American basketball coach and insurance executive
- Shawn Byrdsong (born 1979), American football player
