= Rondell Jones =

American football player (born 1971)

No. 31
- Position: Safety

Personal information
- Born: May 7, 1971 (age 55); Sunderland, Maryland, U.S.
- Listed height: 6 ft 2 in (1.88 m)
- Listed weight: 210 lb (95 kg)

Career information
- High school: Owings (MD) Northern
- College: North Carolina
- NFL draft: 1993: 3rd round, 69th overall pick

Career history
- Denver Broncos (1993–1996); Baltimore Ravens (1997)

Awards and highlights
- Second-team All-ACC (1992)

Career NFL statistics
- Games played - started: 76 - 15
- Tackles: 86
- Interceptions: 3
- Stats at Pro Football Reference

Rondell Tony Jones (born May 7, 1971) is an American former professional football player who was a safety for five seasons with the Denver Broncos and Baltimore Ravens of the National Football League (NFL). He was selected by the Broncos in the third round of the 1993 NFL draft with the 69th overall pick.
