= Broderick Washington =

American football player (born 1996)

Broderick Washington Jr.
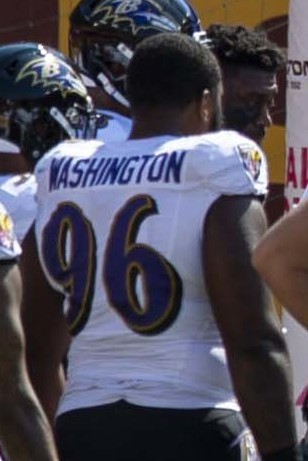
- Washington with the Baltimore Ravens in 2020

No. 96 – Baltimore Ravens
- Position: Defensive end
- Roster status: Active

Personal information
- Born: December 4, 1996 (age 29); Longview, Texas, U.S.
- Listed height: 6 ft 2 in (1.88 m)
- Listed weight: 315 lb (143 kg)

Career information
- High school: Longview
- College: Texas Tech (2015–2019)
- NFL draft: 2020: 5th round, 170th overall pick

Career history
- Baltimore Ravens (2020–present)

Career NFL statistics as of 2025
- Total tackles: 110
- Sacks: 6
- Pass deflections: 9
- Forced fumbles: 1
- Fumble recoveries: 2
- Stats at Pro Football Reference

Broderick Washington Jr. (born December 4, 1996) is an American professional football defensive end for the Baltimore Ravens of the National Football League (NFL). He played college football for the Texas Tech Red Raiders.

== College career ==
Despite playing on the offensive line at Longview High School, Texas Tech offered Washington as a defensive lineman. He started three seasons, was a team captain his junior and senior seasons, and participated in the 2020 Senior Bowl and NFLPA Collegiate Bowl.

== Professional career ==
Pre-draft measurables
Height	Weight	Arm length	Hand span	Wingspan	Bench press
6 ft 2 1/4 in (1.89 m)	305 lb (138 kg)	32 1/2 in (0.83 m)	10 3/8 in (0.26 m)	6 ft 7 in (2.01 m)	23 reps
All values from NFL Combine

Washington was selected in the fifth round (170th overall) of the 2020 NFL draft by the Baltimore Ravens. The Ravens received the 170th pick used to select Washington as a result from a trade that sent Kaare Vedvik to the Minnesota Vikings. Washington signed his rookie contract on May 5, 2020. He was placed on the reserve/COVID-19 list by the team on November 28, and activated two days later.

On August 9, 2023, Washington signed a three-year, $17.5 million contract extension with the Ravens.

== Personal life ==
Washington was arrested in March 2021 in Arlington, Virginia and charged with several property damage-related misdemeanors and felony destruction of property after an incident at a local apartment complex where police alleged that he damaged several vehicles and an apartment exterior. Washington, who admitted to being intoxicated at the time of the incident and did not have a previous criminal record, later pled no contest to a single charge of misdemeanor destruction of property. He received a suspended sentence and fine conditional on his completion of both community service and a restitution plan.
