= T. J. Tampa =

American football player (born 2002)

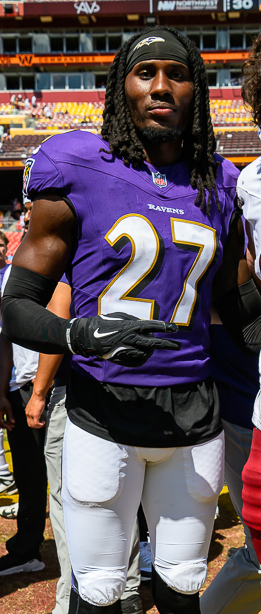
- Tampa with the Baltimore Ravens in 2025

No. 27 – Baltimore Ravens
- Position: Cornerback
- Roster status: Active

Personal information
- Born: March 13, 2002 (age 24); Norristown, Pennsylvania, U.S.
- Listed height: 6 ft 1 in (1.85 m)
- Listed weight: 190 lb (86 kg)

Career information
- High school: Lakewood (Saint Petersburg, Florida)
- College: Iowa State (2020–2023)
- NFL draft: 2024: 4th round, 130th overall pick

Career history
- Baltimore Ravens (2024–present)

Awards and highlights
- First-team All-Big 12 (2023); Second-team All-Big 12 (2022)

Career NFL statistics as of Week 7, 2026
- Total tackles: 34
- Interceptions: 1
- Pass deflections: 2
- Stats at Pro Football Reference

Marques "T. J." Tampa Jr. (born March 13, 2002) is an American professional football cornerback for the Baltimore Ravens of the National Football League (NFL). He played college football for the Iowa State Cyclones and was selected by the Ravens in the fourth round of the 2024 NFL draft.

== Early life ==
Marques Tampa Jr. was born in Norristown, Pennsylvania and moved to Jonesboro, Georgia at age three. At 15, he moved to St. Petersburg, Florida and attended Lakewood High School. In his high school career he played on both offense and defense. On offense he caught 67 passes for 1,323 yards and 15 touchdowns. On defense he tallied 33 tackles with nine being for a loss, four sacks, two pass deflections, an interception, a fumble recovery, and two forced fumbles. Tampa would decide to commit to play college football at Iowa State over schools such as Georgia, Maryland, Rutgers, Toledo, UCF, and South Florida.

== College career ==
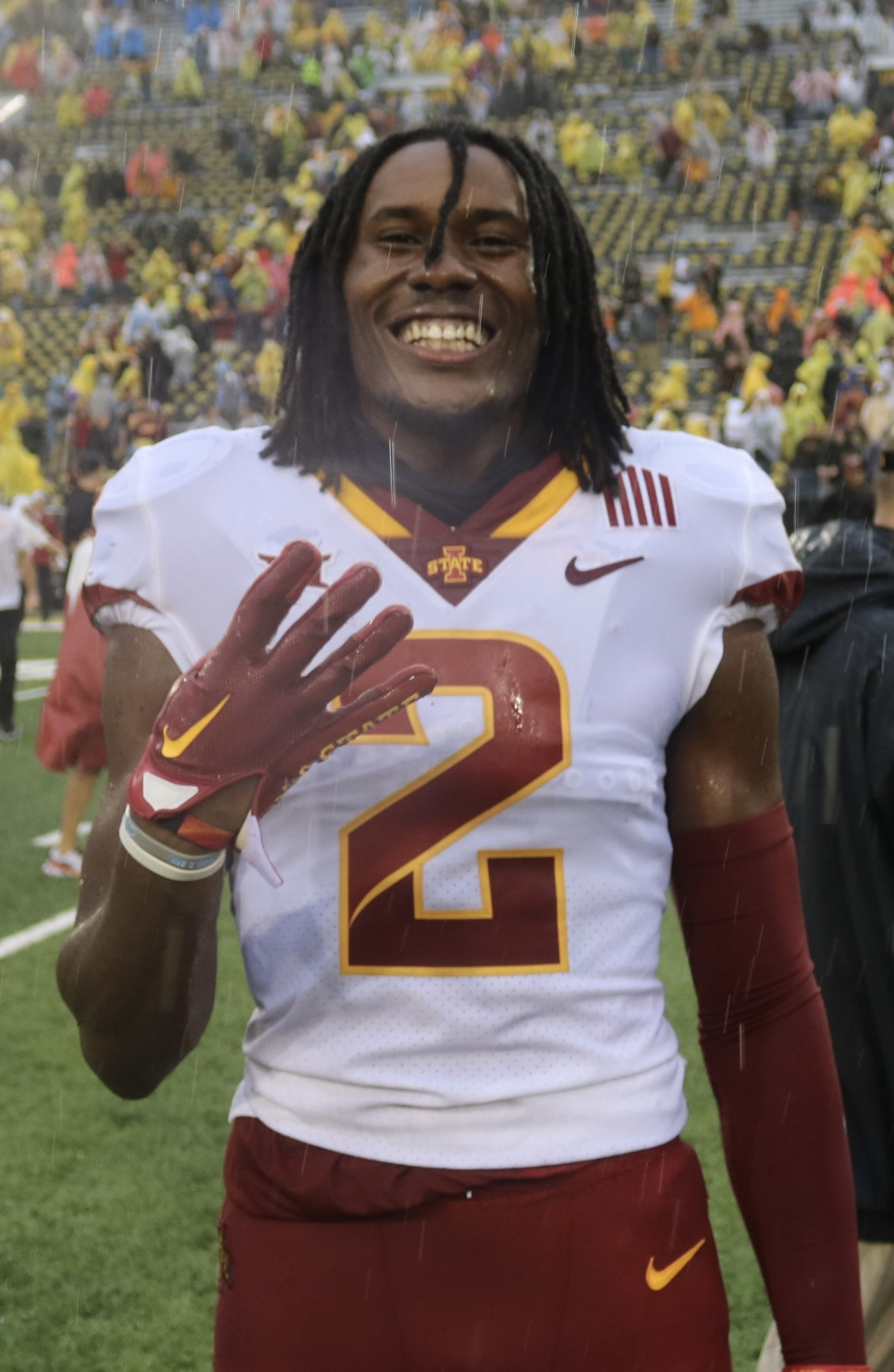
Tampa with the Iowa State Cyclones in 2022

In Tampa's first season in 2020, he recorded five tackles with one being for a loss. In Tampa's second year he took a step up racking up 18 tackles with 0.5 going for a loss, and three pass deflections. In week nine of the 2022 season, Tampa had a career day, tallying seven tackles with one going for a loss, and four pass deflections, but the Cyclones fell to Oklahoma. In week eleven, Tampa recorded his first career interception, picking off a pass by Gunnar Gundy, but Iowa State lost to Oklahoma State. Tampa finished his breakout 2022 season with 40 tackles including five going for a loss, nine pass defelections, an interception, and a forced fumble. For his performance on the season, Tampa was selected to the second-team all-Big-12. Tampa was named preseason first-team all-Big-12, for the 2023 season. Tampa was also named to the Jim Thorpe Award watch list, which is awarded to the best defensive back in the country, and to the Bronko Nagurski Trophy watch list, which is given to nation's best defensive player.

== Professional career ==
Pre-draft measurables
Height	Weight	Arm length	Hand span	Wingspan	40-yard dash	10-yard split	20-yard split	20-yard shuttle	Three-cone drill
6 ft 0 7/8 in (1.85 m)	189 lb (86 kg)	32 1/8 in (0.82 m)	9 5/8 in (0.24 m)	6 ft 6 5/8 in (2.00 m)	4.59 s	1.64 s	2.65 s	4.07 s	6.97 s
All values from NFL Combine/Pro Day

The Baltimore Ravens selected Tampa in the fourth round of the 2024 NFL draft. On July 15, 2024, He was placed on the Physically Unable to Perform (PUP) list.

During the Ravens' Week 12 matchup of the 2025 NFL season, against the New York Jets, Tampa recorded his first career interception, off a pass from Tyrod Taylor.

On September 19, 2026, Tampa was placed on injured reserve after suffering a knee injury that ruled him out for at least four games. He was activated on October 31.
