= Justin Green (fullback) =

American football player (born 1982)

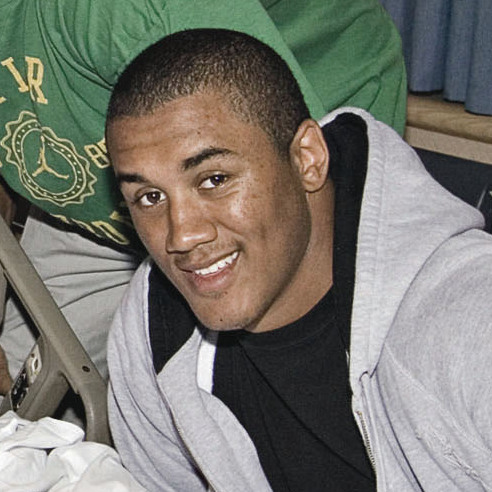
- Green in 2006

Washington State Cougars
- Title: Assistant head coach & running backs coach

Personal information
- Born: April 30, 1982 (age 44); San Diego, California, U.S.
- Listed height: 6 ft 0 in (1.83 m)
- Listed weight: 246 lb (112 kg)

Career information
- Position: Fullback
- High school: University of San Diego
- College: Montana
- NFL draft: 2005: 5th round, 158th overall pick

Career history

Playing
- Baltimore Ravens (2005–2007); New York Jets (2008)*; Arizona Cardinals (2009)
- * Offseason or practice squad member only

Coaching
- Berean Christian HS (CA) (RB/LB/CB) (2008); Berean Christian HS (CA) (RB/LB/CB) (2010); Montana (GA) (2011); Montana (RB/RC) (2012–2025); Washington State (AHC/RB) (2026–present)

Awards and highlights
- Big Sky Newcomer of the Year (2003)

Career NFL statistics
- Receptions: 13
- Receiving yards: 65
- Stats at Pro Football Reference

Justin Green (born April 30, 1982) is an American former professional football player who was a fullback in the National Football League (NFL). He was selected by the Baltimore Ravens in the fifth round of the 2005 NFL draft. He played college football for the Montana Grizzlies.

Green was also a member of the New York Jets and Arizona Cardinals.

== Early life ==
Green attended the University of San Diego High School and was a student and earned three varsity letters in football and two in basketball. In football, he was a two-time League MVP and a two-time first-team All-California Interscolastic Federation honoree. In basketball, he helped his team win the state championship. He finished his high school career in the year 2000 with 5,397 yards rushing, which, at the time, was the most rushing yards in the history of San Diego high school football. That record has since been broken in 2005 by Demetrius Sumler, who also attended the University of San Diego High School.

== College career ==
Green started out his career at San Diego State, then transferred to San Diego Mesa College in San Diego, California. He then transferred to the University of Montana, and finished his career with 1,784 yards on 412 carries (4.3 yards per carry avg.), and 15 receptions for 93 yards (6.2 yd. per rec. avg.). As a junior, he was named the Big Sky Conference's Newcomer of the Year and as a senior, he won Honorable Mention All-Big Sky Conference honors. He was a sociology major.

== Professional career ==
=== Baltimore Ravens ===
Green was selected by the Baltimore Ravens in the fifth round (158th overall) in the 2005 NFL draft. He was utilized mostly as a blocking fullback in 2005 by the Baltimore Ravens. His solid play was rewarded with 4 starts and 12 games played in his rookie campaign. Green played in both the Ravens Monday Night Football games in 2005, and started one of them. His game worn jersey from the Monday Night game with Green Bay was auctioned on eBay and sold for a few hundred dollars. Green also played on special teams. He made his NFL debut on September 11 versus the Indianapolis Colts. Green finished the year with 4 yards rushing on 5 attempts, and 32 yards on 7 catches with no touchdowns.

In 2006, he played in 12 games and made three starts. He finished the campaign with four catches for 17 yards. He shredded his knee with just four weeks left during the 2006 season, however, had earned his way back into the starting lineup during the preseason in 2007.

=== New York Jets ===
Green was claimed off waivers by the New York Jets on August 14, 2008, however he was waived just a day later.

=== Arizona Cardinals ===
After spending the 2008 season out of football, Green was signed to a future contract by the Arizona Cardinals on January 13, 2009. He was placed on season-ending injured reserve on September 5.

== Coaching career ==
In February 2012, Green was hired as the running backs coach for the Montana Grizzlies, his alma mater.

In 2026, he was hired as the assistant head coach and running backs coach for the Washington State Cougars.

== Personal life ==
Green married in 2007 to Meghan Korsmeier and has 3 children.
