= Cornell Brown =

American football player and coach (born 1975)

Eastern Michigan Eagles
- Title: Defensive tackles coach

Personal information
- Born: March 15, 1975 (age 51); Englewood, New Jersey, U.S.
- Listed height: 6 ft 0 in (1.83 m)
- Listed weight: 240 lb (109 kg)

Career information
- High school: Lynchburg (VA) E. C. Glass
- College: Virginia Tech (1993–1996)
- NFL draft: 1997: 6th round, 194th overall pick

Career history

Playing
- Baltimore Ravens (1997–2000); Oakland Raiders (2002)*; Baltimore Ravens (2002–2004)
- * Offseason or practice squad member only

Coaching
- Cologne Centurions (2005) Linebackers coach; Frankfurt Galaxy (2006–2007 (Spring)) Defensive line coach; Virginia Tech (2006–2007 (Fall)) Graduate assistant; Virginia Tech (2011–2015) Outside linebackers & defensive ends coach; Norfolk State (2016) Co-defensive coordinator & linebackers coach; Marshall (2017–2020) Defensive ends coach; Tarleton State (2021) Defensive line coach; Calgary Stampeders (2022) Defensive line coach; New Orleans Breakers (2023) Linebackers coach; Bowling Green (2024) Assistant coach & defensive line coach; Eastern Michigan (2025–present) Defensive tackles coach

Awards and highlights
- Super Bowl champion (XXXV); Consensus All-American (1995); Dudley Award (1995); First-team All-American (1996); Big East Defensive Player of the Year (1995); Virginia Tech Sports Hall of Fame; Virginia Sports Hall of Fame

Career NFL statistics
- Tackles: 193
- Sacks: 7
- Forced fumbles: 3
- Stats at Pro Football Reference

Cornell Desmond Brown (born March 15, 1975) is an American football coach and former American college and professional football player who was a linebacker in the National Football League (NFL) for seven seasons. He is currently the defensive tackles coach for Eastern Michigan, a position he has held since 2025. He played college football for Virginia Tech, and earned All-American honors twice. Drafted late in the sixth round of the 1997 NFL draft, he played professionally for the NFL's Baltimore Ravens. In 2013, Brown was inducted into the Virginia Sports Hall of Fame (the state-wide organization that honors sports figures from the state, or who contributed to sports programs in the state).

== Early life ==
Born in Englewood, New Jersey, Brown attended E.C. Glass in Lynchburg, Virginia. He played high school football for the E.C. Glass Hilltoppers, and led them to the state championship game in his senior year in 1992, losing to the Bethel High School team.

== College career ==
Brown attended Virginia Polytechnic Institute and State University, where he played for coach Frank Beamer's Virginia Tech Hokies football team from 1993 to 1996. He earned first-team All-American honors as a defensive end in 1995, and was recognized as a consensus first-team All-American in 1996. He was inducted into the Virginia Tech Sports Hall of Fame in 2007.

== Professional career ==
Pre-draft measurables
Height	Weight	Arm length	Hand span	40-yard dash	10-yard split	20-yard split	20-yard shuttle	Three-cone drill	Vertical jump	Broad jump	Bench press
6 ft 1 1/8 in (1.86 m)	244 lb (111 kg)	33 3/4 in (0.86 m)	9 1/8 in (0.23 m)	5.00 s	1.76 s	2.88 s	4.33 s	7.81 s	32.0 in (0.81 m)	9 ft 7 in (2.92 m)	19 reps

The Baltimore Ravens selected Brown in the sixth round (194th pick overall) of the 1997 NFL draft. He played for the Ravens from 1997 to 2000. With the Ravens, he had success as a backup outside linebacker. He earned a Super Bowl ring when Baltimore defeated the New York Giants 34–7 in Super Bowl XXXV. Brown was hit with a drug charge in 2001 however, and was cut, although the charge was eventually dropped. After going back to Virginia Tech for a year, Brown was picked up by the Oakland Raiders. Cut again, he was re-signed by the Ravens, and played the remainder of his career for them from 2002 to 2004. In his seven NFL seasons, he played in 108 regular season games, started twenty-five of them, and compiled 147 tackles, seven quarterback sacks and three forced fumbles. Brown was inducted into the Virginia Sports Hall of Fame in 2013.

== NFL career statistics ==
Legend
	Won the Super Bowl
**Bold**	Career high

=== Regular season ===
Year	Team	Games		Tackles				Interceptions				Fumbles			
Year	Team	GP	GS	Comb	Solo	Ast	Sck	Int	Yds	TD	Lng	FF	FR	Yds	TD
1997	BAL	16	1	11	11	0	0.5	**1**	**21**	0	**21**	1	0	0	0
1998	BAL	16	1	5	3	2	0.0	0	0	0	0	0	0	0	0
1999	BAL	16	5	36	29	7	1.0	0	0	0	0	0	0	0	0
2000	BAL	16	1	23	17	6	**3.0**	0	0	0	0	**2**	0	0	0
2002	BAL	16	14	**63**	**40**	**23**	1.5	0	0	0	0	0	0	0	0
2003	BAL	16	3	36	31	5	1.0	0	0	0	0	0	0	0	0
2004	BAL	13	0	19	15	4	0.0	0	0	0	0	0	0	0	0
Career		109	25	193	146	47	7.0	1	21	0	21	3	0	0	0

=== Playoffs ===
Year	Team	Games		Tackles				Interceptions				Fumbles			
Year	Team	GP	GS	Comb	Solo	Ast	Sck	Int	Yds	TD	Lng	FF	FR	Yds	TD
2000	BAL	3	0	2	2	0	0.0	0	0	0	0	0	0	0	0
2003	BAL	1	1	**3**	**3**	0	0.0	0	0	0	0	0	0	0	0
Career		4	1	5	5	0	0.0	0	0	0	0	0	0	0	0

== Coaching ==
Brown began his coaching career as an intern with the NFL Europe Cologne Centurions in 2005, then spent 2006 and 2007 as defensive line coach for the Frankfurt Galaxy in the spring and a graduate assistant on Frank Beamer's Virginia Tech coaching staff in the fall. Brown joined the Calgary staff in 2008.

Brown was hired by Virginia Tech as the outside linebackers and assistant defensive line coach in 2011.

Brown was hired by Norfolk State to be the defensive coordinator in 2016.

Brown was hired by Marshall to be the defensive ends coach in 2017.

Brown was hired by Tarleton State to be the defensive line coach in June 2021.

In February 2022, Brown was hired by the Calgary Stampeders as their defensive line coach.

In March 2024, Brown was hired by Bowling Green as their defensive line coach.

In April 2025, Brown was hired by Eastern Michigan as their defensive tackles coach.

== Football family ==
Brown's brother is Ruben Brown, who was a Pro Bowl offensive lineman for the Buffalo Bills and Chicago Bears.
