= David Pittman (American football) =

American gridiron football player (born 1983)

No. 24, 20, 36, 29
- Position: Cornerback

Personal information
- Born: October 14, 1983 (age 43); Gramercy, Louisiana, U.S.
- Listed height: 5 ft 11 in (1.80 m)
- Listed weight: 182 lb (83 kg)

Career information
- High school: Lutcher (Lutcher, Louisiana)
- College: Northwestern State
- NFL draft: 2006: 3rd round, 87th overall pick

Career history
- Baltimore Ravens (2006–2007); New Orleans Saints (2008); Houston Texans (2008); New York Sentinels (2009); Pittsburgh Steelers (2010)*; Hartford Colonials (2010); Edmonton Eskimos (2011); Calgary Stampeders (2012)*
- * Offseason or practice squad member only

Career NFL statistics
- Total tackles: 10
- Pass deflections: 3
- Interceptions: 2
- Stats at Pro Football Reference

David Earl Pittman (born October 14, 1983) is an American former professional football player who was a cornerback in the National Football League (NFL). He was selected by the Baltimore Ravens in the third round of the 2006 NFL draft. He played college football for the Northwestern State Demons.

Pittman was also a member of the New Orleans Saints, Houston Texans, New York Sentinels, Pittsburgh Steelers, Hartford Colonials, Edmonton Eskimos, and Calgary Stampeders.

== Early life ==
Pittman was a three-year letterman at Lutcher High School, where he played safety and cornerback.

== Professional career ==
Pre-draft measurables
Height	Weight	Arm length	Hand span	40-yard dash	10-yard split	20-yard split	20-yard shuttle	Three-cone drill	Vertical jump	Broad jump	Bench press
5 ft 11 1/4 in (1.81 m)	182 lb (83 kg)	31 3/8 in (0.80 m)	9 1/2 in (0.24 m)	4.52 s	1.58 s	2.62 s	4.12 s	6.96 s	36.0 in (0.91 m)	10 ft 8 in (3.25 m)	16 reps
All values from NFL Combine/Pro Day

=== Baltimore Ravens ===
With the Baltimore Ravens, Pittman did not play in 2006, but had 10 tackles and two interceptions in 2007.

=== New Orleans Saints and Houston Texans ===
Pittman split the 2008 NFL season with the New Orleans Saints and Houston Texans, but did not play in a game with either team.

=== New York Sentinels ===
Pittman was signed by the New York Sentinels of the United Football League on November 7, 2009.

=== Pittsburgh Steelers ===
On February 10, 2010, Pittman signed with the Pittsburgh Steelers.

=== Hartford Colonials ===
Pittman was signed by the Hartford Colonials on October 27, 2010.

=== Edmonton Eskimos ===
After playing with the Edmonton Eskimos in 2011, Pittman was released on May 22, 2012.

=== Calgary Stampeders ===
Pittman was signed during the 2012 preseason but was released on June 23, 2012.
