= Christian Thompson (American football) =

American football player (born 1990)

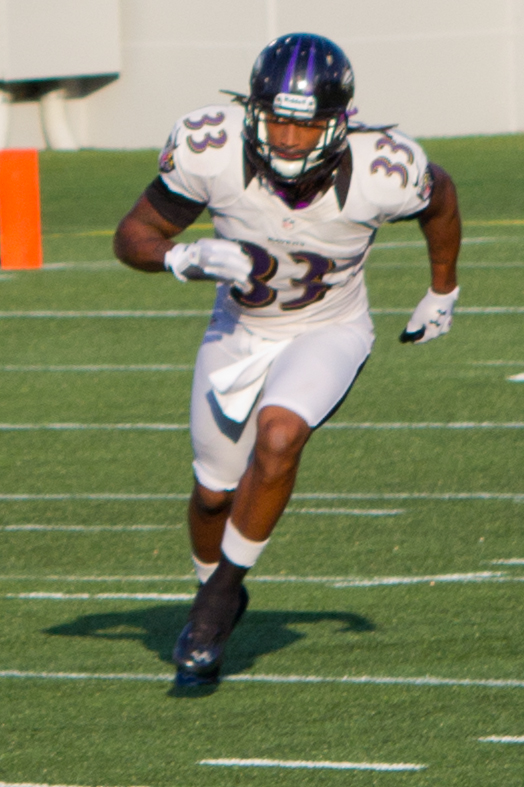
- Thompson during Ravens practice at Navy–Marine Corps Memorial Stadium, August 2012.

No. 33
- Position: Safety

Personal information
- Born: June 14, 1990 (age 36); Melbourne, Florida, U.S.
- Listed height: 6 ft 0 in (1.83 m)
- Listed weight: 211 lb (96 kg)

Career information
- High school: St. Thomas Aquinas (Fort Lauderdale, Florida)
- College: South Carolina State
- NFL draft: 2012: 4th round, 130th overall pick

Career history
- Baltimore Ravens (2012–2013)

Awards and highlights
- Super Bowl champion (XLVII)

Career NFL statistics
- Games played: 7
- Stats at Pro Football Reference

Christian Thompson (born June 14, 1990) is an American former professional football player who was a safety for the Baltimore Ravens of the National Football League (NFL). He played college football for the South Carolina State Bulldogs. He was selected by the Ravens in the fourth round of the 2012 NFL draft.

== Early life ==
He attended St. Thomas Aquinas High School in Fort Lauderdale, Florida.

== College career ==
He played college football at South Carolina State University.

== Professional career ==
Thompson signed a four-year contract with Baltimore Ravens after being drafted in the fourth round of the 2012 NFL draft with the 130th overall pick.

On April 1, 2013, it was announced that Thompson would be suspended for the first four games of the 2013 season for violating the league's substance abuse policy. The Ravens released Thompson on October 1, 2013.
