= Lamar Lyons =

American football player (born 1973)

No. 23, 29
- Position: Defensive back

Personal information
- Born: March 25, 1973 (age 53); Los Angeles, California
- Listed height: 6 ft 3 in (1.91 m)
- Listed weight: 210 lb (95 kg)

Career information
- High school: University (Los Angeles)
- College: Washington

Career history
- Oakland Raiders (1996); Baltimore Ravens (1997)

Career statistics
- Games played: 6
- Stats at Pro Football Reference

Lamar Lyons (born March 25, 1973) is an American former professional football player who was a defensive back in the National Football League (NFL). Lyons played college football for the Washington Huskies. He played in the NFL for the Oakland Raiders in 1996 and for the Baltimore Ravens in 1997.

Lyons joined the Oakland Raiders on May 21, 1996. He was activated from the practice squad in October. He played six games on special teams and as a reserve safety. Lyons was signed by the Ravens in December and played on special teams in the season finale.
