= Ralph Staten =

American football player (born 1974)

No. 41, 38
- Positions: Linebacker, defensive back

Personal information
- Born: December 3, 1974 (age 51); Semmes, Alabama, U.S.
- Listed height: 6 ft 3 in (1.91 m)
- Listed weight: 205 lb (93 kg)

Career information
- High school: Mobile (AL) Montgomery
- College: Alabama
- NFL draft: 1997: 7th round, 236th overall pick

Career history
- Baltimore Ravens (1997–1998); Mobile Seagulls (2000); Edmonton Eskimos (2000–2001); Ottawa Renegades (2002)

Career NFL statistics
- Tackles: 45
- Interceptions: 5
- Sacks: 1
- Stats at Pro Football Reference

Ralph Lahquan Staten (born December 3, 1974) is an American former professional football player who was a linebacker and defensive back in the National Football League (NFL) and Canadian Football League (CFL). He played college football for the Alabama Crimson Tide before being selected by the Baltimore Ravens in the seventh round of the 1997 NFL draft with the 236th overall pick. He later also played for Edmonton Eskimos and Ottawa Renegades in the CFL.

In the 1995 Alabama season, Staten had three interceptions including one against Ole Miss returned 61 yards for a touchdown. He was named to the 1996 All-SEC football team after a 12 sack season. Staten wore number 41 for the Crimson Tide, a hallowed number at Alabama also worn by former All-Americans Courtney Upshaw, Roman Harper, and Vaughn Mancha

On December 4, 2013, Staten was arrested in George County, Mississippi, following a high-speed chase with the police. He was charged with driving under the influence, and was also being considered a "person of interest" in connection to a missing person case in George County, according to authorities. A white man, Welford Lee "Pork Chop" McCarty, was later convicted of the missing man's murder.

== See also ==
- List of NFL players with chronic traumatic encephalopathy
