= Lamont Brightful =

American football player (born 1979)

No. 45
- Position: Cornerback

Personal information
- Born: January 29, 1979 (age 47); Oak Harbor, Washington, U.S.

Career information
- College: Eastern Washington
- NFL draft: 2002: 6th round, 195th overall pick

Career history
- 2002–2003: Baltimore Ravens
- 2004: Miami Dolphins
- 2005: Frankfurt Galaxy
- 2005: New York Giants
- 2006: Montreal Alouettes
- 2007: Calgary Stampeders
- Stats at Pro Football Reference

Lamont Eugene Brightful (born January 29, 1979) is an American former professional football player. Prior to attending Eastern Washington University, Brightful graduated from Mariner High School in Everett, Washington, where he was a standout defensive back, wide receiver, and kick returner.

== College career ==
Brightful played college football at Eastern Washington University. He was also a skilled kick returner, and holds the Div 1AA record for average kick return yards at 30, with over 65 attempts from 1998 to 2001.

== Professional career ==
Brightful was selected by the Baltimore Ravens in the sixth round of the 2002 NFL draft with the 195th overall pick. He played for the Ravens during the 2002 and 2003 seasons, where he was used mostly as a return man.

Brightful was released by the Ravens at the conclusion of the preseason in 2004 and signed with the Miami Dolphins. He was released from the team in 2005. Brightful was cut after having three fumbles in a game as a punt returner against the Cincinnati Bengals.

Brightful was then picked up by the New York Giants and went overseas to play for the Frankfurt Galaxy as cornerback. In 2005, he was ranked the top returner in the league.

In 2006, he joined the Montreal Alouettes in the Canadian Football League as a punt returner and cornerback.

Brightful works as an elite sports performance coach in Richland, Washington at Power Alley Performance, LLC.
