= Anthony Allen (running back) =

American gridiron football player (born 1988)

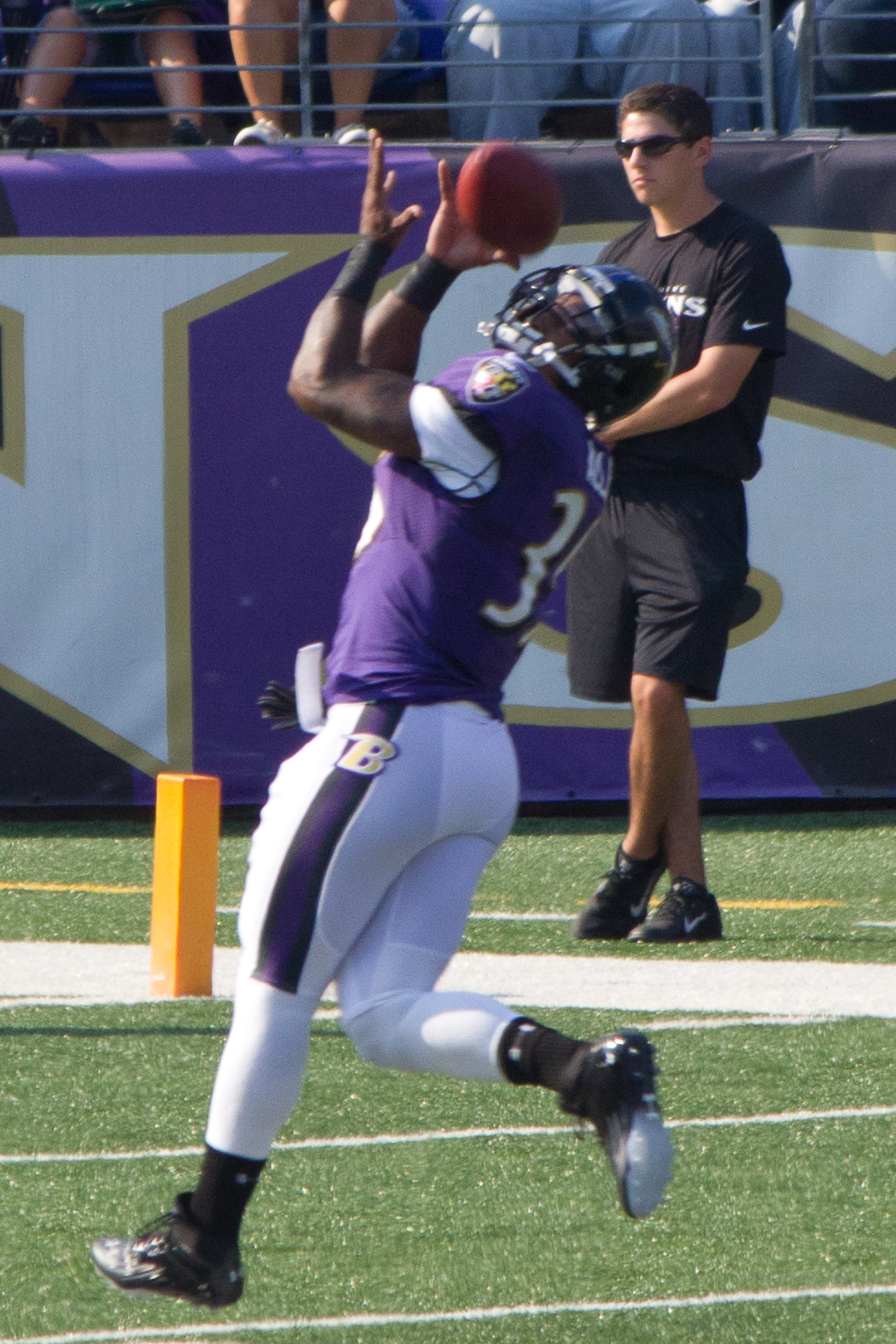
- Allen at Ravens M&T Bank Stadium practice in 2012

No. 35, 26
- Position: Running back

Personal information
- Born: August 6, 1988 (age 38); Tampa, Florida, U.S.
- Listed height: 6 ft 1 in (1.85 m)
- Listed weight: 223 lb (101 kg)

Career information
- High school: Jesuit (Tampa)
- College: Georgia Tech
- NFL draft: 2011: 7th round, 225th overall pick

Career history
- Baltimore Ravens (2011–2013); Buffalo Bills (2014)*; Saskatchewan Roughriders (2014–2015); BC Lions (2016); Saskatchewan Roughriders (2017)*
- * Offseason or practice squad member only

Awards and highlights
- Super Bowl champion (XLVII); First-team All-ACC (2010)

Career NFL statistics
- Rushing attempts: 19
- Rushing yards: 69
- Rushing touchdowns: 1
- Receptions: 2
- Receiving yards: 12
- Stats at Pro Football Reference
- Stats at CFL.ca

Anthony Allen (born August 6, 1988) is an American former professional football player who was a running back in the National Football League (NFL) and Canadian Football League (CFL). He was selected by the Baltimore Ravens in the seventh round of the 2011 NFL draft. His began his college football career with the Louisville Cardinals and set freshman rushing records. He then played the rest of his college career with the Georgia Tech Yellow Jackets.

== Early life ==
Allen attended Jesuit High School in Tampa, Florida.

== Professional career ==
Pre-draft measurables
Height	Weight	Arm length	Hand span	Wingspan	40-yard dash	10-yard split	20-yard split	20-yard shuttle	Three-cone drill	Vertical jump	Broad jump	Bench press
6 ft 0 3/4 in (1.85 m)	228 lb (103 kg)	30 3/8 in (0.77 m)	9 5/8 in (0.24 m)	6 ft 1 1/8 in (1.86 m)	4.59 s	1.60 s	2.60 s	4.06 s	6.79 s	41.5 in (1.05 m)	10 ft 0 in (3.05 m)	24 reps
All values from NFL Combine/Pro Day

=== Baltimore Ravens ===
Allen was selected in the seventh round of the 2011 NFL draft by the Baltimore Ravens. In 2011 as the team's third running back, Allen received three carries for eight yards against the St. Louis Rams. He won his first Super Bowl ring after the Ravens defeated the San Francisco 49ers in Super Bowl XLVII, 34–31. He was released by the team on August 30, 2013.

=== Buffalo Bills ===
On January 14, 2014, Allen signed a 2-year, $1.23M deal. On May 12, 2014, the Buffalo Bills released Allen.

=== Saskatchewan Roughriders (first stint) ===
On June 7, 2014, Allen joined the Saskatchewan Roughriders of the Canadian Football League at their training camp. During the off-season the Riders lost Grey Cup MVP Kory Sheets to the Oakland Raiders; leaving a vacancy at the running back position. Allen filled said position on the opening week of the season galloping to 158 rushing yards on 27 carries, with 1 rushing touchdown. Allen went on to be the main rushing back for the Riders in 2014, carrying the ball almost twice as much as any other player. By the close of the regular season he had 169 rushing attempts for 930 yards (5.5 average), with 5 touchdowns: Good enough for 2nd most rushing yards in the league, trailing only Jon Cornish who finished the campaign with 1,082 yards. He also made contributions in the passing game as well, amassing 244 yards on 36 receptions with 3 touchdowns.

=== BC Lions ===
Allen played in seven games for the BC Lions in 2016.

=== Saskatchewan Roughriders (second stint) ===
Allen signed with the Roighriders on June 2, 2017. He was released on June 17, 2017.
