= Shawn Byrdsong =

American gridiron football player (born 1979)

No. 25
- Position: Defensive back

Personal information
- Born: October 2, 1979 (age 47); Longview, Texas, U.S.
- Listed height: 5 ft 10 in (1.78 m)
- Listed weight: 188 lb (85 kg)

Career information
- High school: Longview (Texas)
- College: Mississippi State (1998–2001)
- NFL draft: 2002: undrafted

Career history
- Baltimore Ravens (2002); New Orleans Saints (2003)*; → Berlin Thunder (2003)*
- * Offseason or practice squad member only
- Stats at Pro Football Reference

Rodrick Shawn Byrdsong (born October 2, 1979) is an American former professional football defensive back who played one season with the Baltimore Ravens of the National Football League (NFL). He played college football at Mississippi State University.

== Early life and college ==
Rodrick Shawn Byrdsong was born on October 2, 1979, in Longview, Texas. He attended Longview High School in Longview.

Byrdsong was a four-year letterman for the Mississippi State Bulldogs of Mississippi State University from 1998 to 2001.

== Professional career ==
Byrdsong signed with the Baltimore Ravens on April 25, 2002, after going undrafted in the 2002 NFL draft. He played in one game for the Ravens during the 2002 season before being released on September 24, 2002.

Byrdsong was signed by the New Orleans Saints on February 4, 2003 and allocated to the Berlin Thunder of NFL Europe. Byrdsong was released by the Thunder on March 23, 2003. He was released by the Saints on July 23, 2003.
