= Leland Taylor (American football) =

American football player (born 1972)

No. 92
- Position: Defensive tackle

Personal information
- Born: October 25, 1972 (age 54); Louisville, Kentucky, U.S.
- Listed height: 6 ft 3 in (1.91 m)
- Listed weight: 305 lb (138 kg)

Career information
- High school: Fairdale (Fairdale, Kentucky)
- College: Tennessee (1992–1995); Louisville (1996)
- NFL draft: 1997: 7th round, 238th overall pick

Career history
- Baltimore Ravens (1997)

Awards and highlights
- Second-team All-C-USA (1996); All-SEC Freshman Team (1993)

Career NFL statistics
- Games played: 1
- Tackles: 1
- Stats at Pro Football Reference

Leland Morrisclay Taylor Jr. (born October 25, 1972) is an American former professional football defensive tackle who played in the National Football League (NFL) for the Baltimore Ravens. He played college football for the Tennessee Volunteers and Louisville Cardinals.

== Early life ==
Taylor was born on October 25, 1972, in Louisville, Kentucky. He attended Fairdale High School in Fairdale, Kentucky. As a senior, Taylor was the Kentucky Gatorade Football Player of the Year.

== College career ==
Taylor played college football for the Tennessee Volunteers from 1992 to 1995 and Louisville Cardinals in 1996. He redshirted his first season and missed the 1993 spring practice for his involvement in a fight. Taylor had 24 tackles and was named to the All-SEC Freshman Team. In 1994, he had 34 tackles, two sacks and five pass deflections in eight games. Taylor was suspended for the 1995 season after he was involved in a $25,000 telephone scandal. He and other athletes at Tennessee made long-distance phone calls using a stolen credit card of an athletics department employee.

Taylor transferred to the University of Louisville for his final year of eligibility. He had 78 tackles, including 14 for loss and seven sacks. Taylor earned second-team All-C-USA honors in 1996. He played in the 1997 East–West Shrine Game.

== Professional career ==
Taylor was selected in the seventh round, with the 238th overall selection, by the Baltimore Ravens in the 1997 NFL draft. On July 14, he officially signed with the team. Taylor played in one game against the San Diego Chargers, recording one tackle. On November 24, he suffered a broken right leg and multiple fractures and ligament damage in his right foot in a single-car accident in Pikesville, Maryland, ending his season. On March 13, 1998, Taylor was released.
