= Chris Ward (defensive lineman) =

American football player (born 1974)

No. 95, 99
- Position: Defensive end

Personal information
- Born: February 4, 1974 (age 52); Atlanta, Georgia, U.S.
- Listed height: 6 ft 3 in (1.91 m)
- Listed weight: 271 lb (123 kg)

Career information
- High school: Southwest DeKalb (Decatur, Georgia)
- College: Kentucky (1992–1996)
- NFL draft: 1997: 7th round, 205th overall pick

Career history
- Baltimore Ravens (1997); Tennessee Oilers (1998)*; Scottish Claymores (2000); Chicago Bears (2000)*; Chicago Enforcers (2001)*; Scottish Claymores (2001); San Diego Chargers (2001–2002)*; Scottish Claymores (2003)
- * Offseason or practice squad member only

Awards and highlights
- All-NFL Europe (2001)
- Stats at Pro Football Reference

Christopher Jamal Ward (born February 4, 1974) is an American former professional football defensive end who played for the Baltimore Ravens of the National Football League (NFL). He played college football for the Kentucky Wildcats and was selected by the Ravens in the seventh round of the 1997 NFL draft.

== Early life ==
Christopher Jamal Ward was born on February 4, 1974, in Atlanta, Georgia. He attended Southwest DeKalb High School in Decatur, Georgia.

== College career ==
Ward enrolled at the University of Kentucky to play college football for the Wildcats. He redshirted the 1992 season and was a four-year letterman from 1993 to 1996. He graduated from Kentucky in 1997 with a bachelor's degree in social work.

== Professional career ==
Ward was selected by the Baltimore Ravens in the seventh round, with the 205th overall pick, of the 1997 NFL draft. He signed with the team on July 14. He played in five games for the Ravens during the 1997 season as a reserve defensive end, posting two solo tackles. Ward was released on August 30, 1998, before the start of the regular season.

Ward was signed to the practice squad of the Tennessee Oilers on October 7, 1998. He became a free agent after the season and re-signed with the team. He was released by the renamed Tennessee Titans on September 3, 1999, before the start of the regular season.

On February 22, 2000, Ward was selected by the Scottish Claymores of NFL Europe in the 2000 NFL Europe draft. He signed with the Chicago Bears on February 28. He played in all ten games for the Claymores during the 2000 NFL Europe season, recording 24 tackles, 5.5 sacks, three forced fumbles, and one pass breakup. The Claymores went 6–4 and lost in World Bowl 2000. Ward was released by the Bears on August 27, 2000, before the start of the NFL regular season.

In October 2000, Ward was selected by the Chicago Enforcers in the 2001 XFL draft. He was waived on January 29, 2001, before the start of the 2001 XFL season.

Ward returned to the Claymores for the 2001 NFL Europe season, earning All-NFL Europe honors after posting 25 tackles, 7.5 sacks, one forced fumble, and four pass breakups. He signed with the San Diego Chargers on August 7, 2001, and was released on September 2, 2001. He was signed by the Chargers again on July 29, 2002, but released on August 24, 2002, after the third preseason game.

Ward returned to the Claymores again in 2003, appearing in all ten games as a backup defensive end while recording 12 tackles, two sacks, and six pass breakups.

== Coaching career ==
Ward was a defensive assistant for the Cologne Centurions of NFL Europe in 2005. He was the Centurions' defensive line coach in 2006. He was the manager of player personnel for the All American Football League from 2007 until the league folded in May 2008. He was later an assistant coach-defensive line coach for the Georgia State Panthers.
