= Wally Williams (American football) =

American football player (born 1971)

No. 67, 63
- Positions: Guard, center

Personal information
- Born: February 20, 1971 (age 55); Tallahassee, Florida, U.S.
- Listed height: 6 ft 2 in (1.88 m)
- Listed weight: 321 lb (146 kg)

Career information
- High school: James S. Rickards (Tallahassee)
- College: Florida A&M
- NFL draft: 1993: undrafted

Career history
- Cleveland Browns (1993–1995); Baltimore Ravens (1996–1998); New Orleans Saints (1999–2002)

Career NFL statistics
- Games played: 108
- Games started: 96
- Fumble recoveries: 3
- Stats at Pro Football Reference

Wally James Williams Jr. (born February 20, 1971) is an American former professional football player who was an offensive lineman in the National Football League (NFL). He played college football for the Florida A&M Rattlers.

== Professional career ==
During his tenure as a professional footballer with the Cleveland Browns, Baltimore Ravens, and New Orleans Saints, Williams was able to excel as an undrafted free agent.

He was the first franchised player in Baltimore Ravens history.

In 2015 was inducted to Florida A&M University Hall of Fame and was also elected to the Baltimore Ravens All-Time Team in 2020.
