= Mike Flynn (American football) =

American football player (born 1974)

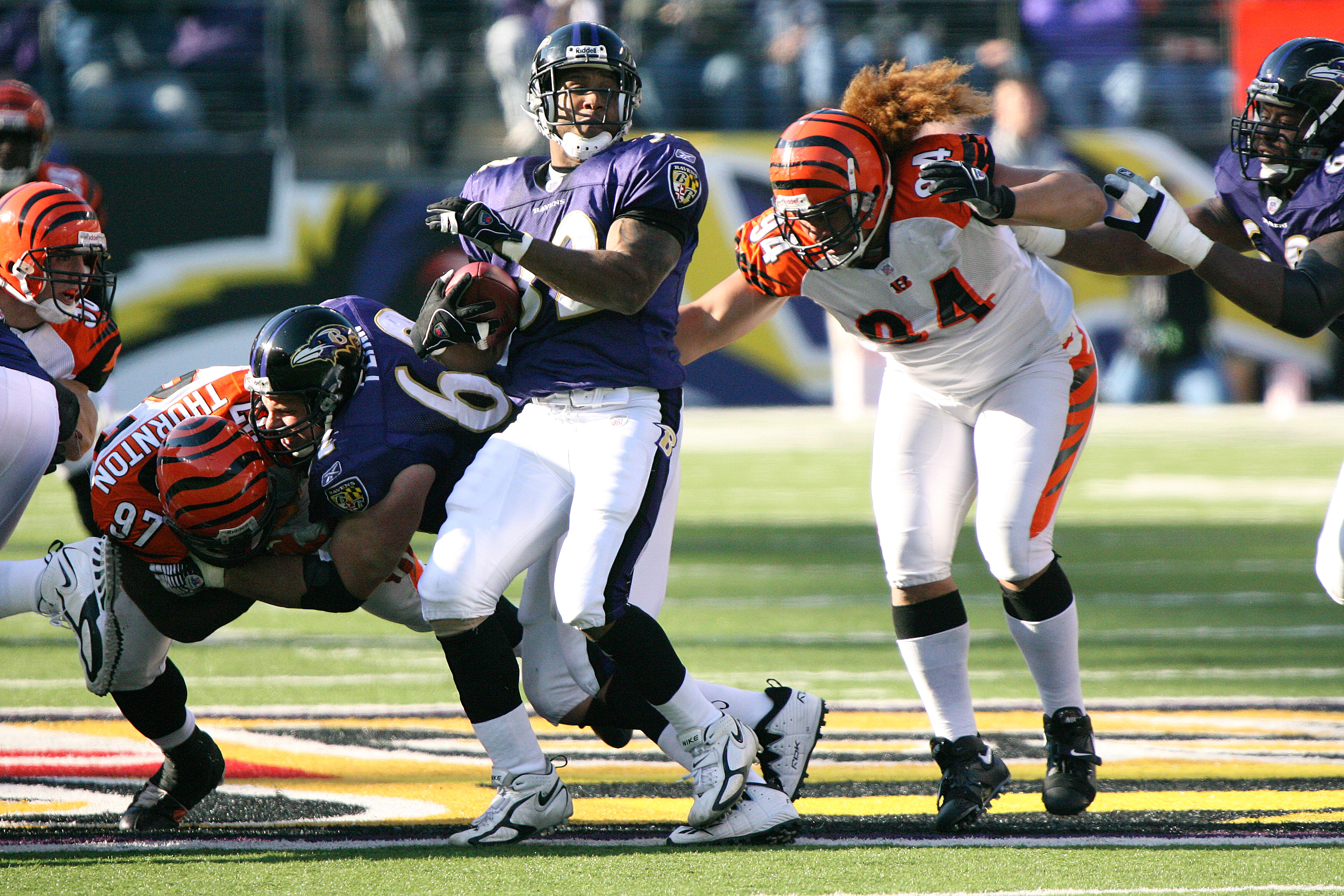
- Flynn (left, 62) playing against the Cincinnati Bengals in 2006.

No. 62
- Position: Center

Personal information
- Born: June 15, 1974 (age 52); Doylestown, Pennsylvania, U.S.
- Listed height: 6 ft 3 in (1.91 m)
- Listed weight: 305 lb (138 kg)

Career information
- High school: Springfield (MA) Cathedral
- College: Maine
- NFL draft: 1997: undrafted

Career history
- Baltimore Ravens (1997)*; Tampa Bay Buccaneers (1997)*; Jacksonville Jaguars (1997)*; Baltimore Ravens (1997–2007); New England Patriots (2008)*
- * Offseason or practice squad member only

Awards and highlights
- Super Bowl champion (XXXV)

Career NFL statistics
- Games played: 134
- Games Started: 115
- Fumble recoveries: 5
- Stats at Pro Football Reference

Michael Patrick Flynn (born June 15, 1974, in Doylestown, Pennsylvania) is a former NFL center. He was signed by the Baltimore Ravens as an undrafted free agent in 1997. He played college football at Maine.

== Early life ==
Flynn grew up in Agawam, Massachusetts and attended Cathedral High School in Springfield, Massachusetts, and was a letterman and a standout in football, basketball, and baseball. Flynn graduated from Cathedral High School in 1992.

== Professional career ==
Going undrafted into the NFL in 1997, Mike Flynn was first signed by the Baltimore Ravens, who released him. Flynn was then picked up by the Tampa Bay Buccaneers and Jacksonville Jaguars. Resigned by Baltimore, Flynn didn't make his debut until 1998. Two years later, the Ravens won Super Bowl XXXV with Flynn as the starting right guard. When center Jeff Mitchell signed elsewhere, Flynn shifted to center and played there for the Ravens through 2007. Picked up by the New England Patriots in 2008, Flynn was released before the season.

== After football ==
Flynn co-hosts a radio show on weekends with Ryan Johnston called "Johnston and Flynn" on 98.5 The Sports Hub in Boston. Flynn also joins "The Toucher and Rich Show" on Mondays both on 98.5 The Sports Hub in Boston during the football season. Flynn now works for the HWRSD and the town of Hamilton as a coach and helper at Miles River Middle School.
