= Courtney Upshaw =

American football player (born 1989)

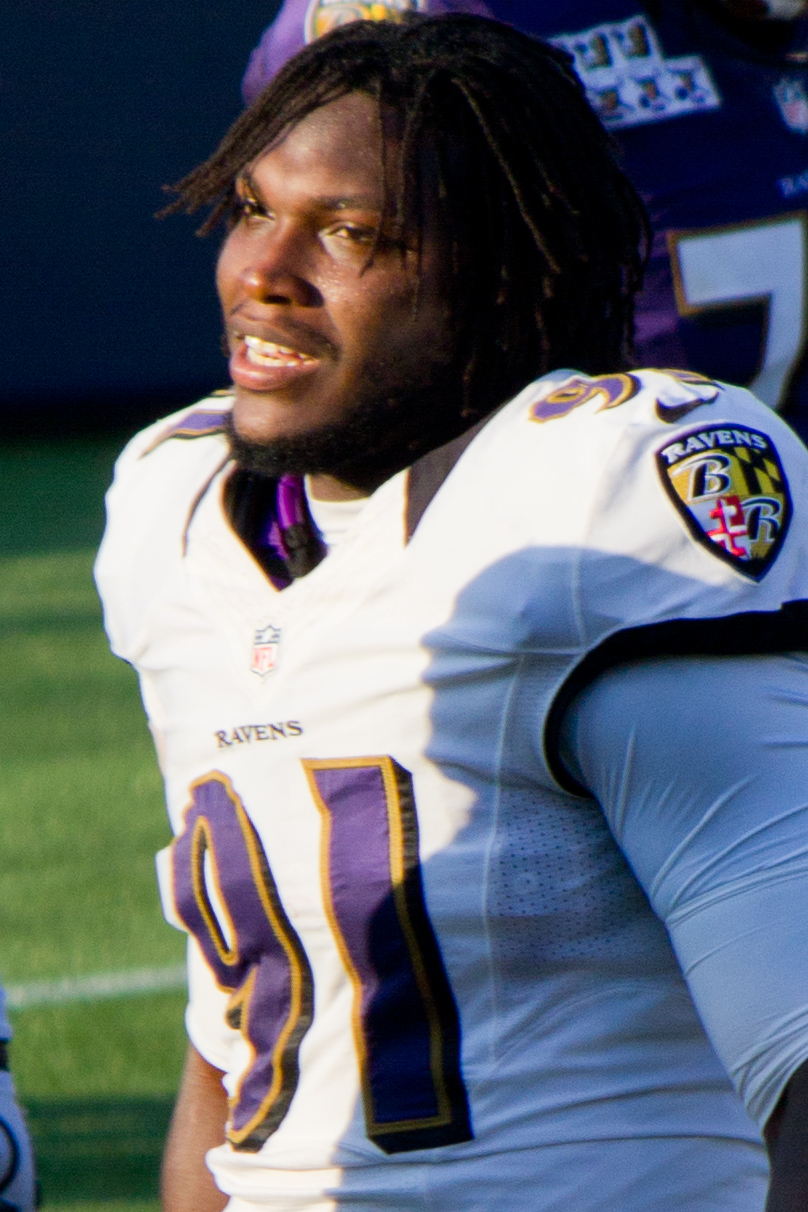
- Upshaw with the Baltimore Ravens in 2012

No. 91
- Position: Linebacker

Personal information
- Born: December 13, 1989 (age 36); Eufaula, Alabama, U.S.
- Listed height: 6 ft 2 in (1.88 m)
- Listed weight: 272 lb (123 kg)

Career information
- High school: Eufaula
- College: Alabama (2008–2011)
- NFL draft: 2012: 2nd round, 35th overall pick

Career history
- Baltimore Ravens (2012–2015); Atlanta Falcons (2016–2017); New York Jets (2018)*
- * Offseason or practice squad member only

Awards and highlights
- Super Bowl champion (XLVII); 2× BCS national champion (2009, 2011); First-team All-American (2011); First-team All-SEC (2011)

Career NFL statistics
- Total tackles: 216
- Sacks: 7.0
- Forced fumbles: 5
- Fumble recoveries: 6
- Stats at Pro Football Reference

Courtney Tremaine Upshaw (born December 13, 1989) is an American former professional football player who was a linebacker in the National Football League (NFL). He played college football for the Alabama Crimson Tide, earning first-team All-American honors in 2011. He was selected by the Baltimore Ravens in the second round of the 2012 NFL draft.

== Early life ==
Upshaw attended Eufaula High School, where he played for the Eufaula Tigers high school football team under head coach Dan Klages. In his junior season, Upshaw posted 96 tackles and three interceptions as he helped lead Eufaula to a 14–1 season record, including the Tigers first state championship finale appearances since 1981. They lost 10–7 to Athens. As a senior, Upshaw had 95 solo tackles, 65 assists, including 22 for loss and seven sacks to go with three fumble recoveries. He also had 20 receptions for 496 yards and three touchdowns as a tight end. He was the Alabama Class 5A Lineman of the Year by the Alabama Sports Writers Association and ASWA Class 5A All-State selection in 2007. Upshaw was ranked as a four-star prospect and ninth in the state of Alabama by Rivals.com.

== College career ==
After playing in all 13 games of his freshman season, Upshaw saw his playing time increase in his second season at Alabama. He made one start and appeared in all 14 games for the Crimson Tide in 2009. Upshaw made the most of his first career start against Kentucky, as he tallied four solo tackles, one sack and returned a fumble 45 yards for a key against the Wildcats. In the 2010 BCS National Championship Game against the Texas Longhorns, Upshaw recovered a Garrett Gilbert fumble on an Eryk Anders quarterback sack with just 3:08 remaining in the game, that sealed the title for the Crimson Tide.

In his junior season, Upshaw started 11 games for the Crimson Tide. He accounted for 52 total tackles, 14.5 tackles for loss, seven sacks, and four forced fumbles. In the 2011 Capital One Bowl against Michigan State, Upshaw led the defense for the Crimson Tide, who won 49–7, with a pair of sacks, five tackles, including three for a loss as well as forcing a fumble, and was voted the game's MVP for his effort.

In his senior season, Upshaw started all 13 games for the Crimson Tide. He accounted for 51 total tackles, 17 tackles for loss, 9.5 sacks, and two forced fumbles. For his on-field performance, Upshaw was named first-team All-America by the Football Writers Association of America and The Sporting News. He was also recognized as second-team All-America by the Walter Camp Football Foundation and the Associated Press. In the 2012 BCS National Championship Game, Upshaw was named the defensive MVP with his seven tackle performance, which included one sack and one tackle for a loss.

=== College statistics ===
Year	Games		Tackles							Interceptions				Fumbles				Blk
Year	GP	GS	Solo	Ast	Cmb	TfL	Yds	Sck	Yds	Int	Yds	BU	PD	QBH	FR	Yds	FF	Blk
2008	13	0	12	10	22	3	3	0	0	0	0	2	2	1	0	0	0	0
2009	14	1	7	8	15	1	1	1	1	0	0	0	0	4	2	45	0	0
2010	13	13	32	20	52	14.5	69	7	40	0	0	2	2	2	1	0	4	0
2011	13	13	37	15	52	18	90	9.5	62	1	45	12	13	10	0	0	2	0
Total	53	27	87	53	140	35.5	157	17.5	103	1	45	5	5	18	3	45	6	0

== Professional career ==
Pre-draft measurables
Height	Weight	Arm length	Hand span	Wingspan	40-yard dash	10-yard split	20-yard split	20-yard shuttle	Three-cone drill	Vertical jump	Broad jump	Bench press
6 ft 1 5/8 in (1.87 m)	272 lb (123 kg)	32 in (0.81 m)	9 in (0.23 m)	6 ft 3 3/4 in (1.92 m)	4.74 s	1.67 s	2.72 s	4.60 s	7.32 s	27.0 in (0.69 m)	9 ft 1 in (2.77 m)	22 reps
All values from NFL Combine/Alabama Pro Day

=== Baltimore Ravens ===
Upshaw was taken by the Baltimore Ravens with the third pick of the second round (35th overall) in the 2012 NFL draft.

On May 10, 2012, he signed a four-year, $5,296,698 contract (with $3,587,000 guaranteed) with the Ravens. During his rookie year in 2012, Upshaw played 16 games with 55 tackles, 1.5 sacks, two passes defended, one forced fumble, and two fumble recoveries. In Super Bowl XLVII, Upshaw recorded his first forced fumble against San Francisco 49ers running back LaMichael James, which the Ravens recovered and scored on the ensuing possession. The Ravens won the Super Bowl by a score of 34–31, giving Upshaw his first championship title.

In 2013, Upshaw played 16 games with 31 tackles, 1.5 sacks, and two passes defended. In 2014, he played 16 games with 46 tackles and one pass defended. In 2015, he played 16 games with 51 tackles, two sacks, two passes defended, two forced fumbles, and two fumble recoveries. After the 2015 season, he became a free agent.

=== Atlanta Falcons ===
On March 25, 2016, Upshaw signed a one-year contract with Atlanta Falcons worth $1.25 million. In 13 games of 2016, Upshaw finished the year with 24 tackles, a sack, and a forced fumble. The Falcons finished the season with an 11–5 record, and eventually made it to Super Bowl LI, where they would lose in overtime to the New England Patriots by a score of 34–28. In the game, Upshaw had one sack and one total tackle.

On March 9, 2017, the Falcons re-signed Upshaw. In the 2017 season, he appeared in 13 games and finished one sack and one forced fumble.

=== New York Jets ===
On June 14, 2018, Upshaw signed with the New York Jets. On July 28, Upshaw was released by the Jets.

== NFL career statistics ==
Legend
**Bold**	Career high

=== Regular season ===
Year	Team	Games		Tackles					Interceptions					Fumbles			
Year	Team	GP	GS	Cmb	Solo	Ast	Sck	TFL	Int	Yds	TD	Lng	PD	FF	FR	Yds	TD
2012	BAL	**16**	9	**60**	**38**	**22**	1.5	**8**	0	0	0	0	1	1	2	**5**	0
2013	BAL	**16**	13	30	19	11	1.5	2	0	0	0	0	**2**	0	0	0	0
2014	BAL	**16**	14	42	25	17	0.0	4	0	0	0	0	1	0	0	0	0
2015	BAL	**16**	**15**	51	29	**22**	**2.0**	3	0	0	0	0	**2**	**2**	**3**	0	0
2016	ATL	13	5	24	15	9	1.0	1	0	0	0	0	1	1	1	0	0
2017	ATL	13	0	9	5	4	1.0	2	0	0	0	0	0	1	0	0	0
Career		90	56	216	131	85	7.0	20	0	0	0	0	7	5	6	5	0

=== Playoffs ===
Year	Team	Games		Tackles					Interceptions					Fumbles			
Year	Team	GP	GS	Cmb	Solo	Ast	Sck	TFL	Int	Yds	TD	Lng	PD	FF	FR	Yds	TD
2012	BAL	**4**	**2**	**9**	**7**	**2**	0.0	**1**	0	0	0	0	0	**1**	0	0	0
2014	BAL	2	**2**	4	3	1	**1.0**	**1**	0	0	0	0	0	0	0	0	0
2016	ATL	3	0	1	1	0	**1.0**	**1**	0	0	0	0	0	0	0	0	0
2017	ATL	2	0	2	0	**2**	0.0	0	0	0	0	0	**1**	0	0	0	0
Career		11	4	16	11	5	2.0	3	0	0	0	0	1	1	0	0	0

== Personal life ==
In 2023, Upshaw was hired as defensive line coach under Rush Propst at Pell City High School (AL).
