= Tyrell Peters =

American football player (born 1974)

No. 53
- Position: Linebacker

Personal information
- Born: August 4, 1974 (age 52); Oklahoma City, Oklahoma, U.S.
- Listed height: 6 ft 0 in (1.83 m)
- Listed weight: 230 lb (104 kg)

Career information
- High school: Norman (OK)
- College: Oklahoma

Career history
- Seattle Seahawks (1997)*; Baltimore Ravens (1997–1999); New York/New Jersey Hitmen (2001)
- * Offseason or practice squad member only

Awards and highlights
- First-team All-Big Eight (1995); Second-team All-Big Eight (1994)
- Stats at Pro Football Reference

Tyrell Peters (born August 4, 1974) is an American former professional football player who was a linebacker for the Baltimore Ravens of the National Football League (NFL) from 1997 to 1999. He also played for the New York/New Jersey Hitmen in 2001.
