= Peter Boulware =

American football player (born 1974)

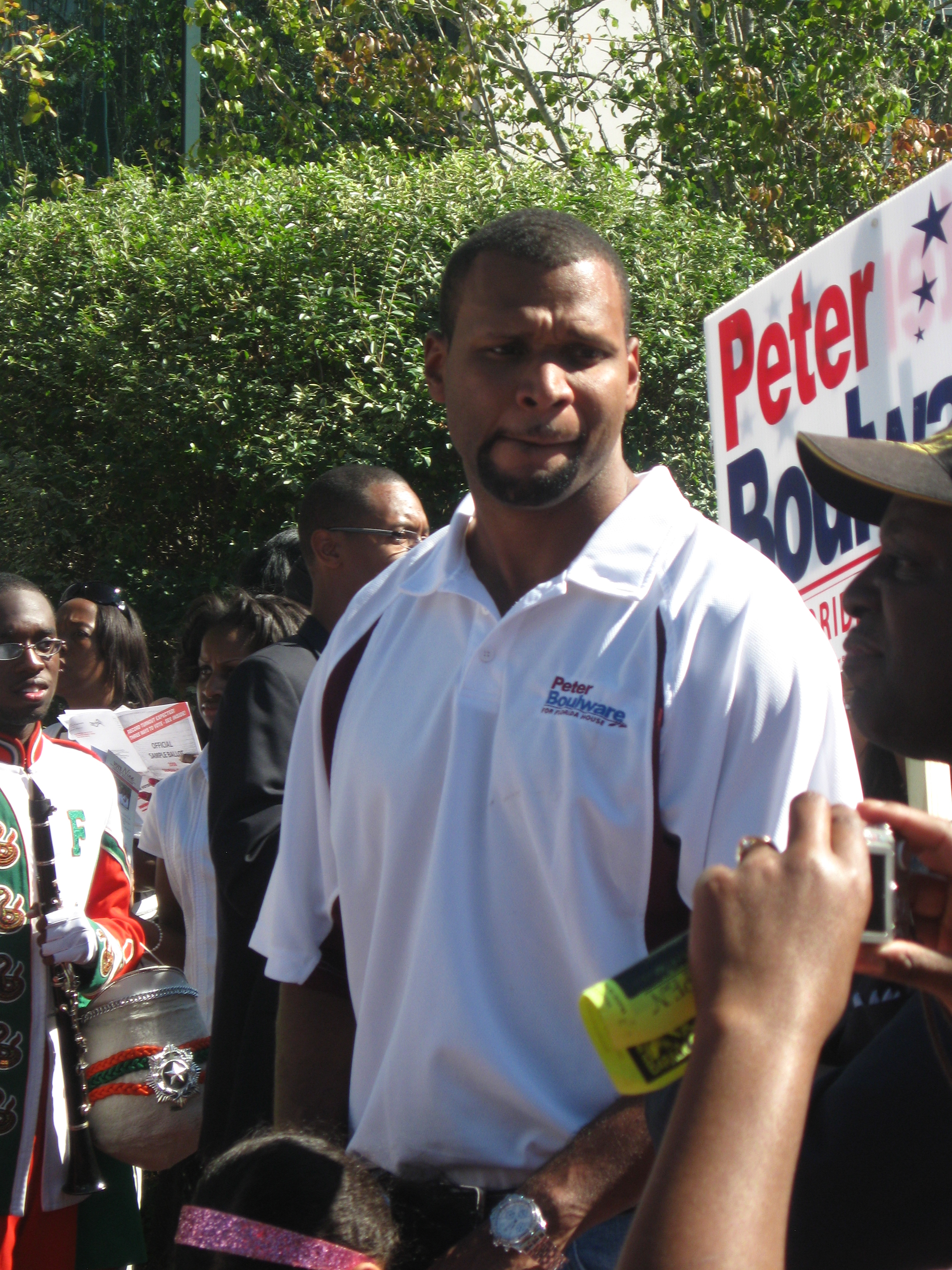
- Boulware campaigning in 2008 for a seat in the Florida House of Representatives

No. 58
- Position: Linebacker

Personal information
- Born: December 18, 1974 (age 51); Columbia, South Carolina, U.S.
- Listed height: 6 ft 4 in (1.93 m)
- Listed weight: 255 lb (116 kg)

Career information
- High school: Spring Valley (Columbia)
- College: Florida State (1993–1996)
- NFL draft: 1997: 1st round, 4th overall pick

Career history
- Baltimore Ravens (1997–2005)

Awards and highlights
- Super Bowl champion (XXXV); NFL Defensive Rookie of the Year (1997); Second-team All-Pro (1999); 4× Pro Bowl (1998, 1999, 2002, 2003); PFWA All-Rookie Team (1997); Baltimore Ravens Ring of Honor; National champion (1993); Consensus All-American (1996); ACC Defensive Player of the Year (1996); First-team All-ACC (1996)

Career NFL statistics
- Tackles: 401
- Sacks: 70.0
- Forced fumbles: 14
- Fumble recoveries: 5
- Interceptions: 1
- Stats at Pro Football Reference

Peter Nicholas Boulware (born December 18, 1974) is an American former professional football player who was a linebacker for nine seasons with the Baltimore Ravens of the National Football League (NFL). He played college football for the Florida State Seminoles, earning recognition as a consensus All-American. A first-round pick of Baltimore in the 1997 NFL draft, he played his entire pro career for the Ravens.

Boulware was a Republican candidate for the Florida House of Representatives in the 2008 general election.

== Early life ==
Boulware was born in Columbia, South Carolina. He played at Heathwood Hall Episcopal School, and then graduated first from Spring Valley High School, and went on to play for Florida State University. He was an all-state pick for Spring Valley High School in 1992. He recorded 132 tackles, 14 sacks, and two blocked punts and was named one of the top 50 athletes in the nation by The Atlanta Journal-Constitution. He was also named one of the nation's top 100 athletes by the Dallas Morning News.

== College career ==
Boulware accepted an athletic scholarship to attend Florida State University, where he played for coach Bobby Bowden's Seminoles teams from 1993 to 1996. He redshirted his freshman season in 1993; as a redshirt freshman in 1994, he recorded 37 tackles, five sacks, and five tackles for loss. One of his sacks was recorded against Florida Gators quarterback Danny Wuerffel in the 1995 Sugar Bowl.

As a sophomore, Boulware totaled 46 tackles, an ACC-leading ten sacks, and 18 tackles for losses, which ranked second in the ACC, and was named honorable mention All-ACC. As a junior, Boulware totaled 68 tackles, a school record 19 sacks, 20 tackles for losses, seven forced fumbles, and three fumble recoveries. He was a consensus first-team All-American, All-ACC, ACC Defensive Player of the Year, as well as National Defensive Player of the Year by Football News. His 19 sacks were the most in the nation. Boulware decided to enter the 1997 NFL draft. Boulware graduated on April 26, 1997, with a degree in management information systems.

Boulware was one of six defensive ends selected to Sports Illustrated's all-20th century college football team.

== Professional career ==
Pre-draft measurables
Height	Weight	Arm length	Hand span	40-yard dash	10-yard split	20-yard split	20-yard shuttle	Three-cone drill	Vertical jump
6 ft 4 1/8 in (1.93 m)	254 lb (115 kg)	33 3/4 in (0.86 m)	9 3/4 in (0.25 m)	4.76 s	1.66 s	2.79 s	4.20 s	7.64 s	34.0 in (0.86 m)

The Baltimore Ravens selected Boulware in the first round, with the fourth overall pick in the 1997 NFL draft. In 1997 Boulware recorded 66 total tackles, 11.5 sacks, and one forced fumble to receive the NFL Defensive Rookie of the Year by the Associated Press. He would play for the Ravens for eight years, going to four Pro Bowls and becoming the Ravens' all-time sack leader, a title he held until he was surpassed by Terrell Suggs in 2011. Boulware was also a member of the Baltimore Ravens' Super Bowl-winning team during the 2000 NFL season. The Ravens released Peter Boulware prior to the 2005 season, then re-signed him to a lower salary. Before the 2006 season, the Ravens released him again due to injuries and he decided to retire. Boulware finished his career with 493 tackles, a franchise record 70 sacks, 26.5 tackles for losses, 13 forced fumbles, five fumble recoveries, 19 pass deflections, and one interception for six yards in 126 career games.

== Personal life ==
Peter Boulware is married and has five children. He is also the owner/managing partner of Toyota dealerships in Tallahassee, Florida and Columbia, South Carolina. He has been featured in his dealerships’ commercials. He also founded a private school, Community Leadership Academy. His younger brother, Michael Boulware, also played in the NFL.

== Honors ==
Peter Boulware was officially inducted into the Baltimore Ravens' Ring of Honor in a ceremony held during halftime of the game between the Ravens and the Bengals on November 5, 2006.

== Politics ==
On September 10, 2007, Peter Boulware announced his candidacy for the Florida state house as a member of the Republican Party. On August 26, 2008, Boulware won the Republican primary with 84.1 percent of the vote. On November 7, with all ballots counted from the election held on November 4, Democrat Michelle Rehwinkle Vasilinda beat Boulware by 430 votes, for an open Florida House seat. Following the election Boulware was appointed to the Florida Board of Education by Governor Charlie Crist.

Boulware contributed the federally allowed maximum to the presidential candidacy of Mike Huckabee in the 2008 presidential election primary.

== NFL career statistics ==
Legend
	Won the Super Bowl
**Bold**	Career high

=== Regular season ===
Year	Team	Games		Tackles				Fumbles				Interceptions					
Year	Team	GP	GS	Cmb	Solo	Ast	Sck	FF	FR	Yds	TD	Int	Yds	Avg	Lng	TD	PD
1997	BAL	16	16	58	43	15	11.5	1	0	0	0	0	0	0.0	0	0	0
1998	BAL	16	16	61	38	**23**	8.5	0	1	0	0	0	0	0.0	0	0	0
1999	BAL	16	11	37	31	6	10.0	3	0	0	0	0	0	0.0	0	0	2
2000	BAL	16	15	39	33	6	7.0	2	0	0	0	0	0	0.0	0	0	1
2001	BAL	16	14	66	44	22	**15.0**	**4**	1	0	0	0	0	0.0	0	0	**4**
2002	BAL	16	16	**73**	**57**	16	7.0	0	**2**	**4**	0	**1**	**6**	**6.0**	**6**	0	**4**
2003	BAL	15	14	58	42	16	8.5	**4**	1	0	0	0	0	0.0	0	0	2
2004	BAL	Did not play due to injury															
2005	BAL	15	0	9	5	4	2.5	0	0	0	0	0	0	0.0	0	0	1
Career		126	102	401	293	108	70.0	14	5	4	0	1	6	6.0	6	0	14

=== Postseason ===
Year	Team	Games		Tackles				Fumbles				Interceptions					
Year	Team	GP	GS	Cmb	Solo	Ast	Sck	FF	FR	Yds	TD	Int	Yds	Avg	Lng	TD	PD
2000	BAL	4	4	**19**	**14**	**5**	**2.0**	**1**	0	0	0	0	0	0.0	0	0	**1**
2001	BAL	2	2	5	3	2	1.0	**1**	**1**	0	0	0	0	0.0	0	0	0
2003	BAL	Did not play due to injury															
Career		6	6	24	17	7	3.0	2	1	0	0	0	0.0	0	0	0	1

== See also ==
- List of Spring Valley High School alumni
