= Jermaine Lewis (American football, born 1974) =

American football player (born 1974)

No. 84
- Positions: Wide receiver, return specialist

Personal information
- Born: October 16, 1974 (age 52); Lanham, Maryland, U.S.
- Listed height: 5 ft 7 in (1.70 m)
- Listed weight: 183 lb (83 kg)

Career information
- High school: Eleanor Roosevelt (Greenbelt, Maryland)
- College: Maryland (1992–1995)
- NFL draft: 1996: 5th round, 153rd overall pick
- Expansion draft: 2002: 1st round, 6th overall pick

Career history
- Baltimore Ravens (1996–2001); Houston Texans (2002); Jacksonville Jaguars (2003–2004)

Awards and highlights
- Super Bowl champion (XXXV); First-team All-Pro (1998); Second-team All-Pro (2001); 2× Pro Bowl (1998, 2001); NFL punt return yards leader (2001); First-team All-ACC (1995); Second-team All-ACC (1993)

Career NFL statistics
- Receptions: 143
- Receiving yards: 2,129
- Return yards: 7,893
- Total touchdowns: 23
- Stats at Pro Football Reference

Jermaine Edward Lewis (born October 16, 1974) is an American former professional football player who was a wide receiver in the National Football League (NFL). He was selected in the fifth round (153rd overall) of the 1996 NFL draft by the Baltimore Ravens, who he played for until 2001. With the Ravens, he won Super Bowl XXXV. He played college football for the Maryland Terrapins.

In his career Lewis also played for the Houston Texans and Jacksonville Jaguars.

== Early life ==
Lewis attended Eleanor Roosevelt High School, where he was a two-time team MVP as a running back, while also as a sprinter on the track team, setting a national high school record in the 200 meters in 1992.

== College career ==
Lewis was a four-year starter at Maryland, where he set several ACC records, including a record 193 receptions.

=== Track and field ===
Lewis was also a track star at Maryland, where he competed in the 100 meters and 200 meters, posting personal bests of 10.33 seconds and 20.82 seconds, respectively.

==== Personal bests ====
Event	Time (seconds)	Venue	Date
100 meters	10.33	Sacramento, California	June 13, 1992
200 meters	20.82	Elmhurst, Illinois	June 20, 1992

== Professional career ==
Pre-draft measurables
Height	Weight	Arm length	Hand span	40-yard dash	10-yard split	20-yard split	20-yard shuttle	Vertical jump
5 ft 7 3/8 in (1.71 m)	172 lb (78 kg)	31 3/8 in (0.80 m)	9 in (0.23 m)	4.47 s	1.55 s	2.62 s	4.30 s	33.5 in (0.85 m)

Lewis was selected by the Baltimore Ravens in the fifth round (153rd overall) of the 1996 NFL draft. As a rookie, he established himself as the team's kick and punt returner, as well as their slot receiver.

From 1996 to 2001, Lewis scored 23 touchdowns (a franchise record passed by Jamal Lewis in 2003) and made the Pro Bowl in 1998 and 2001 as a returner. He led the NFL in punt return average in 1997 with 15.6 yards-per-return, punt return yards in 2001 with 519, and punt return touchdowns in 1998 and 2000 with two. In the Ravens 34–7 win over the New York Giants in Super Bowl XXXV, he had 152 all-purpose yards (111 kickoff return yards, 34 punt return yards, seven receiving yards, one rushing yard), including an 84-yard kickoff return for a touchdown in the second half that put the game out of reach.

In the 2002 expansion draft, Lewis was selected sixth by the Houston Texans, carrying a salary cap figure of US$4.29 million. However, he was released by the Texans after just one season. He then played for the Jacksonville Jaguars in 2003 and 2004 before being allocated to NFL Europe.

Lewis finished his nine NFL seasons with 148 rushing yards, 143 receptions for 2,129 yards, 295 punt returns for 3,282 yards, and 4,611 yards on kickoff returns. Overall, he recorded 10,170 total all-purpose yards and scored 23 touchdowns (17 receiving, six punt returns). With the Ravens, he gained 8,001 all-purpose yards, which stood as a franchise record until surpassed by Jamal Lewis in 2006. His 3,282 punt return yards ranked him 7th on the NFL all-time list.

== NFL career statistics ==
Legend
	Led the league
**Bold**	Career high

=== Regular season ===
Year	Team	Games		Receiving					Rushing					Kick returns					Punt returns					Fumbles	
Year	Team	GP	GS	Rec	Yds	Avg	Lng	TD	Att	Yds	Avg	Lng	TD	Ret	Yds	Avg	Lng	TD	Ret	Yds	Avg	Lng	TD	Fum	Lost
1996	BAL	16	1	5	78	15.6	24	1	1	-3	-0.3	-3	0	41	883	21.5	44	0	36	339	9.4	46	0	**4**	**2**
1997	BAL	14	7	**42**	648	15.4	42	**6**	3	35	11.7	**24**	0	41	905	22.1	51	0	28	437	15.6	**89**	**2**	3	0
1998	BAL	13	13	41	**784**	19.1	**73**	**6**	5	20	4.0	9	0	6	145	24.2	37	0	32	405	12.7	87	**2**	3	**2**
1999	BAL	15	6	25	281	11.2	46	2	5	11	2.2	4	0	8	158	19.8	25	0	**57**	452	7.9	33	0	1	1
2000	BAL	15	1	19	161	8.5	26	1	3	**38**	**12.7**	23	0	1	23	23.0	23	0	36	**578**	**16.1**	**89**	**2**	0	0
2001	BAL	15	2	4	32	8.0	12	0	**9**	33	3.7	14	0	42	**1,039**	**24.7**	**76**	0	42	519	12.4	62	0	2	0
2002	HOU	12	2	2	41	20.5	33	0	3	8	2.7	5	0	**46**	961	20.9	45	0	36	280	7.8	48	0	3	**2**
2003	JAX	2	0	4	100	**25.0**	65	1	1	6	6.0	6	0	6	111	18.5	26	0	5	45	9.0	14	0	0	0
2004	JAX	9	0	1	4	4.0	4	0	—	—	—	—	—	21	386	18.4	26	0	23	227	9.9	50	0	2	0
Career		111	32	143	2,129	14.9	73	17	30	148	4.9	24	0	212	4,611	21.8	76	0	295	3,282	11.1	89	6	18	7

=== Playoffs ===
Year	Team	Games		Receiving					Rushing					Kick returns					Punt returns					Fumbles	
Year	Team	GP	GS	Rec	Yds	Avg	Lng	TD	Att	Yds	Avg	Lng	TD	Ret	Yds	Avg	Lng	TD	Ret	Yds	Avg	Lng	TD	Fum	Lost
2000	BAL	4	1	**1**	**6**	**6.0**	**6**	0	**3**	**7**	**2.3**	**5**	0	5	**189**	**37.8**	**84**	**1**	**11**	**122**	11.1	39	0	**1**	0
2001	BAL	2	0	—	—	—	—	—	2	4	2.0	**5**	0	**6**	104	17.3	28	0	5	102	**20.4**	**88**	**1**	**1**	0
Career		6	1	1	6	6.0	6	0	5	11	2.2	5	0	11	293	26.6	84	1	16	224	14.0	88	1	2	0

== Awards and highlights ==
- Super Bowl champion (XXXV)
- 2× Pro Bowl (1998, 2001)
- First-team All-Pro (1998)
- Second-team All-Pro (2001)
- 3× AFC Special Teams Player of the Week (Week 15, 1997; Week 4, 1998; Week 17, 2000)
- 2× AFC Special Teams Player of the Month (September 1998; December 2000)

=== Ravens franchise records ===
- Most career punt return yards (2,730)
- Most career punt return touchdowns (6)
- Most career punt returns (231)
- Most career All-purpose yards (8,001)
- Most career kickoff returns (139)

== Personal life ==
Lewis has three sons. He also had a child named Geronimo, who was stillborn in 2000. Lewis has a charity in honor of Geronimo called the Geronimo Lewis Foundation.

On August 15, 2011, Lewis was arrested and charged with resisting arrest by the Baltimore County Police Department. The arrest occurred after a hit and run car accident. Lewis was arrested again on February 16, 2012.
