= James Jones (defensive lineman) =

American football player (born 1969)

No. 96, 93, 97, 98
- Position: Defensive tackle

Personal information
- Born: February 6, 1969 (age 57); Davenport, Iowa, U.S.
- Listed height: 6 ft 2 in (1.88 m)
- Listed weight: 295 lb (134 kg)

Career information
- High school: Davenport Central (IA)
- College: Northern Iowa
- NFL draft: 1991: 3rd round, 57th overall pick

Career history
- Cleveland Browns (1991–1994); Denver Broncos (1995); Baltimore Ravens (1996–1998); Detroit Lions (1999–2000)

Career NFL statistics
- Tackles: 373
- Sacks: 37
- Interceptions: 1
- Stats at Pro Football Reference

James Alfie Jones (born February 6, 1969) is an American former professional football player who was a defensive tackle in the National Football League (NFL). He played college football at Northern Iowa. Jones was selected 57th overall in the third round of the 1991 NFL Draft by the Cleveland Browns. He played ten professional seasons as a defensive tackle for four teams from 1991 to 2000. Jones never missed a game in his 10-year career.

Pre-draft measurables
Height	Weight	Arm length	Hand span	40-yard dash	10-yard split	20-yard split	20-yard shuttle	Vertical jump	Broad jump	Bench press
6 ft 1 3/8 in (1.86 m)	299 lb (136 kg)	32 1/2 in (0.83 m)	9 3/4 in (0.25 m)	5.19 s	1.79 s	2.99 s	4.61 s	27.5 in (0.70 m)	8 ft 4 in (2.54 m)	25 reps
All values from NFL Combine
