= Sammy Williams (American football) =

American football player (born 1974)

No. 72, 78, 79, 60
- Position: Offensive tackle

Personal information
- Born: December 14, 1974 (age 51); Magnolia, Mississippi, U.S.
- Listed height: 6 ft 5 in (1.96 m)
- Listed weight: 310 lb (141 kg)

Career information
- High school: Thornton Township (Harvey, Illinois)
- College: Oklahoma
- NFL draft: 1998: 6th round, 164th overall pick

Career history
- Baltimore Ravens (1998); Kansas City Chiefs (1999); Baltimore Ravens (1999–2001); Berlin Thunder (2001); San Diego Chargers (2002); Jacksonville Jaguars (2003)

Awards and highlights
- Super Bowl champion (XXXV)

Career NFL statistics
- Games played: 29
- Games started: 14
- Stats at Pro Football Reference

Sammy R. Williams (born December 14, 1974) is an American former professional football player who played offensive tackle for four seasons for the Kansas City Chiefs, Baltimore Ravens, and San Diego Chargers. He was selected by the Ravens in the sixth round of the 1998 NFL draft with the 164th overall pick.

Pre-draft measurables
Height	Weight	Arm length	Hand span	40-yard dash	10-yard split	20-yard split	20-yard shuttle	Vertical jump	Broad jump	Bench press
6 ft 4 1/2 in (1.94 m)	318 lb (144 kg)	34 1/8 in (0.87 m)	10 1/2 in (0.27 m)	5.50 s	1.93 s	3.17 s	5.16 s	25.5 in (0.65 m)	8 ft 2 in (2.49 m)	16 reps

Before Oklahoma, he was a two-year starter for Coffeyville Community College.
