= Sale Isaia =

American football player (1972–2022)

No. 64, 75, 76, 72
- Position: Guard

Personal information
- Born: June 13, 1972; Honolulu, Hawaii, U.S.
- Died: November 23, 2022 (aged 50); Topeka, Kansas, U.S.
- Listed height: 6 ft 5 in (1.96 m)
- Listed weight: 320 lb (145 kg)

Career information
- High school: Oceanside (Oceanside, California)
- College: UCLA
- NFL draft: 1995: undrafted

Career history
- Cleveland Browns (1995); Baltimore Ravens (1996–1998); Indianapolis Colts (1999)*; Frankfurt Galaxy (2000); Oakland Raiders (2000)*; New England Patriots (2000)
- * Offseason or practice squad member only

Career NFL statistics
- Games played: 25
- Games started: 14
- Fumble recoveries: 2
- Stats at Pro Football Reference

Sale Isaia Jr. (June 13, 1972 – November 23, 2022) was an American professional football player who was a guard in the National Football League (NFL). He played college football for the UCLA Bruins. He was originally signed as an undrafted free agent by the Cleveland Browns in 1995.

== College career ==
Isaia attended the University of California, Los Angeles (UCLA) and originally played on the defensive line his first three seasons before being moved to the offensive line.

== Professional career ==
After going undrafted in the 1995 NFL draft, Isaia was signed by the Cleveland Browns. As a rookie, he did not appear in any games. In 1996, he appeared in nine games. In 1997, he injured his knee and was placed on injured reserve on August 18, 1997. However, he didn't appear in another game until 2000.

On April 1, 1999, Isaia signed with the Indianapolis Colts. On February 17, 2000, he was signed by the Oakland Raiders. He was released on August 27, 2000. Three days later, he was signed by the New England Patriots. In 2000, he appeared in all 16 regular season games starting 14. On May 15, 2001, he was released by the Patriots.

== Death ==
Isaia Jr. died of a heart attack in Topeka, Kansas at age 50.

== Personal life ==
Isaia was of Samoan descent. His son Jacob was projected to be one of Hawaii's top prospects in the class of 2018, and played for Fresno State.
