= Tyrus McCloud =

American football player (born 1974)

No. 54
- Position: Linebacker

Personal information
- Born: November 23, 1974 (age 51); Fort Lauderdale, Florida, U.S.
- Listed height: 6 ft 1 in (1.85 m)
- Listed weight: 250 lb (113 kg)

Career information
- High school: Nova (Davie, Florida)
- College: Louisville
- NFL draft: 1997: 4th round, 118th overall pick

Career history
- Baltimore Ravens (1997–1998); Washington Redskins (2000); Miami Dolphins (2001)*
- * Offseason or practice squad member only

Awards and highlights
- Third-team All-American (1996); 2× C-USA Defensive Player of the Year (1995, 1996)

Career NFL statistics
- Tackles: 30
- Fumble recoveries: 1
- Stats at Pro Football Reference

Tyrus McCloud (born November 23, 1974) is an American former professional football player who was a linebacker in the National Football League (NFL). He played college football for the Louisville Cardinals and was selected 118th overall by the Baltimore Ravens in the fourth round of the 1997 NFL draft. He played two seasons for the Ravens.

McCloud attended Nova High School, where he played for Coach Willie Dodaro, as well as being on Coach Dodaro's staff at Olympic Heights High School for the 2002 and 2003 seasons.

McCloud was the first player at the University of Louisville to bench press 500 pounds in the Howard Schnellenberger era. Submitted by former strength coach Ed Ruscher.
