= 2001 Baltimore Ravens season =

NFL team season

- Owner: Art Modell
- General manager: Ozzie Newsome
- Head coach: Brian Billick
- Offensive coordinator: Matt Cavanaugh
- Defensive coordinator: Marvin Lewis
- Home stadium: PSINet Stadium

Results
- Record: 10–6
- Division place: 2nd AFC Central
- Playoffs: Won Wild Card Playoffs (at Dolphins) 20–3; Lost Divisional Playoffs (at Steelers) 10–27
- Pro Bowlers: T Jonathan Ogden; TE Shannon Sharpe; DT Sam Adams; LB Ray Lewis; FS Rod Woodson; KR Jermaine Lewis

Uniform
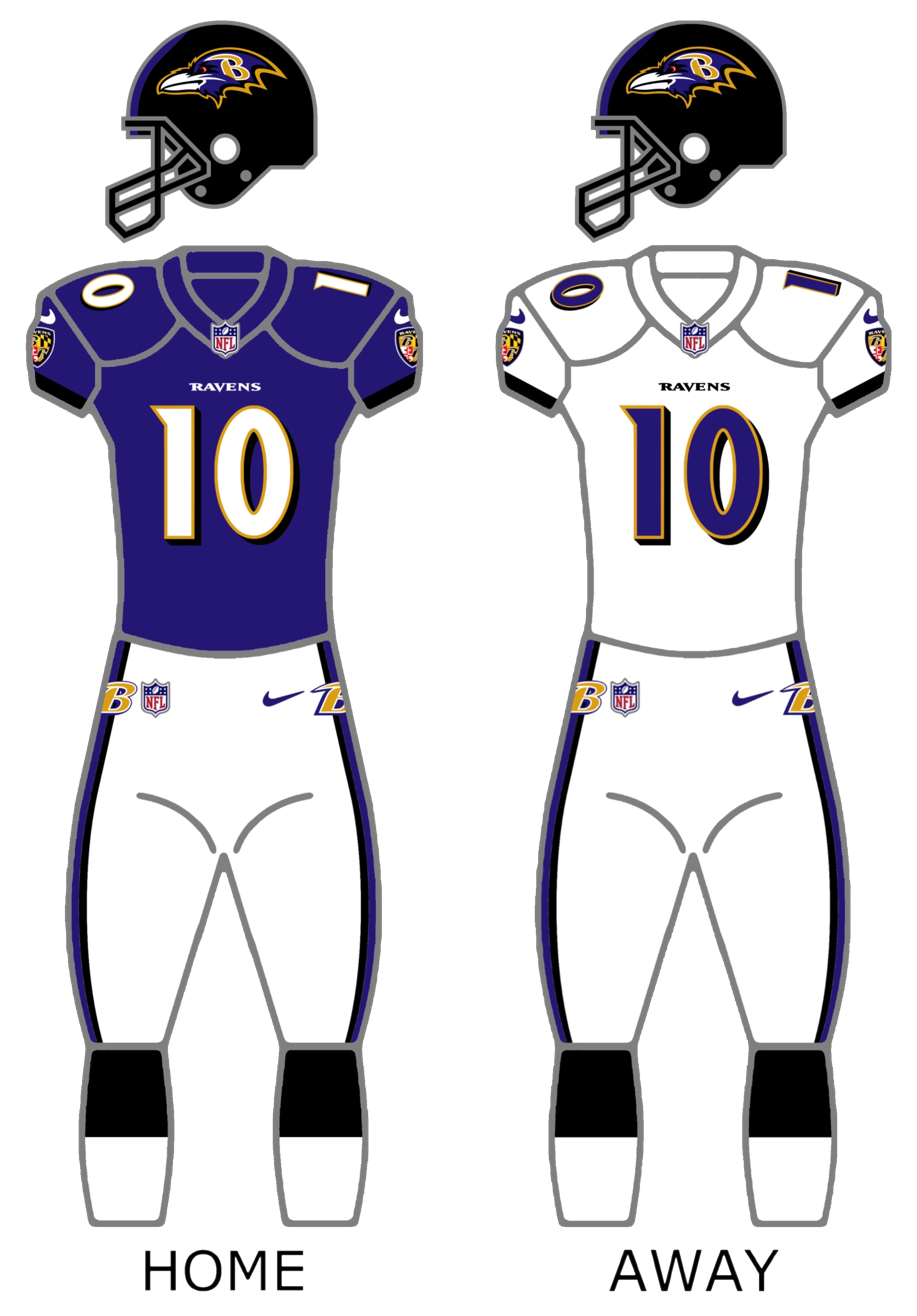

The 2001 season was the Baltimore Ravens' sixth season in the National Football League (NFL) and the third under head coach Brian Billick.

Fresh off their victory trip from Super Bowl XXXV, bad news struck the 2001 Ravens as running back Jamal Lewis suffered a knee injury in training camp and would miss the entire season. This weakened the Ravens’ running game. Trent Dilfer was allowed to leave in free agency, and the Ravens elected to have a quarterback room that had Elvis Grbac as the primary starter with Randall Cunningham as the backup. Grbac went 8-6 as a starter but threw 15 touchdowns to 18 interceptions while Cunningham won both of his two starts. Terry Allen led the Ravens in rushing with 658 yards while Jason Brookins had five rushing touchdowns. On the receiving side, Qadry Ismail had 1,059 receiving yards on 74 receptions for seven touchdowns while Shannon Sharpe had a Pro Bowl season with 73 receptions for 811 yards as a tight end. Jermaine Lewis returned 42 punts for 519 yards to go along with 42 kick returns for 1,039 yards and was a Pro Bowl player. Ray Lewis had a league-high 162 combined tackles with three interceptions while Peter Boulware had a career-high 15 sacks.

The Ravens were swept by the Browns for the first time since they returned to Cleveland, and the Ravens also failed to equal their 12–4 record from 2000, instead going 10–6 but eventually reaching the postseason for the second consecutive year. They easily shut down the Miami Dolphins, 20–3 in the wild-card round, but were unable to stop the 13–3 Pittsburgh Steelers, in the next round, due to a series of turnovers and penalties.

This was the final season Randall Cunningham, Dale Hellestrae, Erik Williams and Carnell Lake would play in the NFL.

== Offseason ==
Throughout training camp, the team was the first to be covered by and featured on the HBO series Hard Knocks.

=== Draft ===
2001 Baltimore Ravens draft
Round	Pick	Player	Position	College	Notes
1	31	Todd Heap *	TE	Arizona State	
2	62	Gary Baxter	CB	Baylor	
3	92	Casey Rabach	C	Wisconsin	
4	148	Edgerton Hartwell	LB	Western Illinois	
5	161	Chris Barnes	RB	New Mexico State	
6	194	Joe Maese	LS	New Mexico	
7	231	Dwayne Missouri	DE	Northwestern	
Made roster † Pro Football Hall of Fame * Made at least one Pro Bowl during career

== Personnel ==
=== Staff / Coaches ===
2001 Baltimore Ravens staff
Front office: Owner and CEO – Art Modell; President and coo – David Modell; Minority owner – Steve Bisciotti; Vice president of player personnel – Ozzie Newsome; Director of football administration – Pat Moriarty; Director of college scouting – Phil Savage; Director of pro personnel – James Harris; Assistant director of pro personnel – George Kokinis; Head coaches: Head coach – Brian Billick; Assistant head coach/secondary – Steve Shafer; Offensive coaches: Offensive coordinator – Matt Cavanaugh; Running backs – Matt Simon; Wide receivers – Mike Nolan; Tight ends/assistant offensive line – Wade Harman; Offensive line – Jim Colletto	Defensive coaches: Defensive coordinator – Marvin Lewis; Defensive line – Rex Ryan; Linebackers – Jack Del Rio; Defensive backs – Donnie Henderson; Defensive assistant/defensive line – Mike Smith; Special teams coaches: Special teams coordinator – Russ Purnell; Assistant special teams – Paul McCord; Assistant special teams – Bennie Thompson; Strength and conditioning: Head athletic trainer – Bill Tessendorf; Strength and conditioning – Jeff Friday; Assistant strength and conditioning – Chip Morton; Assistant strength and conditioning – Paul Ricci

=== Roster ===
2001 Baltimore Ravens roster
Quarterbacks (QB): 1 Randall Cunningham; 18 Elvis Grbac; 7 Chris Redman; Running backs (RB): 29 Terry Allen; 30 Obafemi Ayanbadejo FB; 44 Jason Brookins; 32 Sam Gash FB; 39 Alan Ricard; 23 Moe Williams; Wide receivers (WR): 87 Qadry Ismail; 83 Patrick Johnson; 84 Jermaine Lewis; 80 Brandon Stokley; 89 Travis Taylor; Tight ends (TE): 86 Todd Heap; 88 John Jones; 82 Shannon Sharpe	Offensive linemen (OL): 66 Bennie Anderson G; 74 Orlando Bobo G; 62 Mike Flynn C; 64 Edwin Mulitalo G; 75 Jonathan Ogden T; 65 Jason Thomas G/T; 77 Kipp Vickers G/T; 78 Sammy Williams T; Defensive linemen (DL): 95 Sam Adams DT; 90 Rob Burnett DE; 91 Lional Dalton DT; 94 Marques Douglas DE; 73 Kelly Gregg DT; 98 Tony Siragusa DT; 96 Adalius Thomas DE; 79 Larry Webster DT	Linebackers (LB): 58 Peter Boulware OLB; 56 Edgerton Hartwell MLB; 50 Brad Jackson OLB; 52 Ray Lewis MLB; 55 Jamie Sharper OLB; 54 Shannon Taylor OLB; Defensive backs (DB): 28 Gary Baxter CB/S; 45 Corey Harris SS/KR; 37 Carnell Lake SS; 21 Chris McAlister CB/PR; 42 Anthony Mitchell FS; 24 Alvin Porter CB; 22 Duane Starks CB; 38 James Trapp CB; 26 Rod Woodson FS; Special teams (ST): 70 Dale Hellestrae LS; 12 Danny Kight K; 5 Kyle Richardson P; 3 Matt Stover K	Practice squad: 85 Jonathan Burrough TE; 81 Kenyon Hambrick WR; 17 Bobby Newcombe QB; 53 Anthony Sessions LB; 33 Reggie Waddell CB; Reserve: 15 Albert Horsey WR (IR); 31 Jamal Lewis RB (IR); 59 Joe Maese LS (IR); 99 Michael McCrary DE (IR); 72 Leon Searcy T (IR); 76 Erik Williams; Rookies in italics 52 active, 6 reserve, 5 practice squad

== Schedule ==
=== Preseason ===
Week	Date	Opponent	Result	Record
1	August 13	at Philadelphia Eagles	Canceled	
2	August 18	at New York Jets	**L** 3–16	0–1
3	August 23	Carolina Panthers	**L** 17–20	0–2
4	August 31	New York Giants	**W** 38–9	1–2

=== Regular season ===
Week	Date	Opponent	Result	Record	Venue	Attendance
1	September 9	Chicago Bears	**W** 17–6	1–0	PSINet Stadium	69,365
2 (Note: The Ravens were originally scheduled to host the Minnesota Vikings during Week 2 of the original NFL schedule (September 17) at PSINet Stadium. However, due to the September 11 attacks, the game was rescheduled to Week 17.)	September 23	at **Cincinnati Bengals**	**L** 10–21	1–1	Paul Brown Stadium	51,121
3	September 30	at Denver Broncos	**W** 20–13	2–1	Invesco Field at Mile High	75,082
4	October 7	**Tennessee Titans**	**W** 26–7	3–1	PSINet Stadium	69,494
5	October 14	at Green Bay Packers	**L** 23–31	3–2	Lambeau Field	59,866
6	October 21	at **Cleveland Browns**	**L** 14–24	3–3	Cleveland Browns Stadium	72,818
7	October 28	**Jacksonville Jaguars**	**W** 18–17	4–3	PSINet Stadium	69,439
8	November 4	at **Pittsburgh Steelers**	**W** 13–10	5–3	Heinz Field	62,906
9	November 12	at **Tennessee Titans**	**W** 16–10	6–3	Adelphia Coliseum	68,798
10	November 18	**Cleveland Browns**	**L** 17–27	6–4	PSINet Stadium	69,353
11	November 25	at **Jacksonville Jaguars**	**W** 24–21	7–4	Alltel Stadium	53,530
12	December 2	Indianapolis Colts	**W** 39–27	8–4	PSINet Stadium	69,382
13	Bye					
14	December 16	**Pittsburgh Steelers**	**L** 21–26	8–5	PSINet Stadium	69,506
15	December 23	**Cincinnati Bengals**	**W** 16–0	9–5	PSINet Stadium	68,987
16	December 29	at Tampa Bay Buccaneers	**L** 10–22	9–6	Raymond James Stadium	65,619
17	January 7	Minnesota Vikings	**W** 19–3	10–6	PSINet Stadium	69,465
Note: Intra-division opponents are in **bold** text.

=== Postseason ===
Week	Date	Opponent	Result	Record	Attendance
Wild Card	January 13, 2002	at Miami Dolphins	**W** 20–3	1–0	72,251
Divisional	January 20, 2002	at Pittsburgh Steelers	**L** 10–27	1–1	63,976

== Division standings ==
AFC Central
	W	L	T	PCT	PF	PA	STK
^{(1)} Pittsburgh Steelers	13	3	0	.813	352	212	W1
^{(5)} Baltimore Ravens	10	6	0	.625	303	265	W1
Cleveland Browns	7	9	0	.438	285	319	L1
Tennessee Titans	7	9	0	.438	336	388	L2
Jacksonville Jaguars	6	10	0	.375	294	286	L2
Cincinnati Bengals	6	10	0	.375	226	309	W2

== Game summaries ==
=== AFC Wild Card game vs Miami Dolphins ===
Baltimore Ravens vs Miami Dolphins

Quarter	1	2	3	4	Total
Ravens	0	7	7	6	20
Dolphins	3	0	0	0	3

at Pro Player Stadium, Miami, Florida

- Game time: 4:00 p.m. EST
- Game weather: 73 °F or 22.8 °C, partly sunny
- Game attendance: 72,251
- Referee: Mike Carey
- TV announcers (CBS): Greg Gumbel (play-by-play), Phil Simms (color commentator), Armen Keteyian, and Bonnie Bernstein (sideline reporters)

Game information
- Scoring
  - MIA – field goal Mare 33 MIA 3–0
  - BAL – Allen 4 run (Stover kick) BAL 7–3
  - BAL – Taylor 4 pass from Grbac (Stover kick) BAL 14–3
  - BAL – field goal Stover 35 BAL 17–3
  - BAL – field goal Stover 40 BAL 20–3

=== AFC Divisional Playoff vs Pittsburgh Steelers ===
	1	2	3	4	Total
Ravens	0	3	7	0	10
Steelers	10	10	0	7	27

at Heinz Field, Pittsburgh, Pennsylvania

- Game time: 12:30 pm EST
- Game weather: 30 °F or −1.1 °C (Mostly Cloudy)
- Game attendance: 63,976
- Referee: Tony Corrente
- TV announcers: (CBS) Dick Enberg (play by play), Dan Dierdorf (color commentator), Bonnie Bernstein (sideline reporter)
