= 2002 Baltimore Ravens season =

NFL team season

- Owner: Art Modell
- General manager: Ozzie Newsome
- Head coach: Brian Billick
- Home stadium: Ravens Stadium

Results
- Record: 7–9
- Division place: 3rd AFC North
- Playoffs: Did not qualify
- All-Pros: T Jonathan Ogden (1st team)
- Pro Bowlers: T Jonathan Ogden; TE Todd Heap; LB Peter Boulware

Uniform
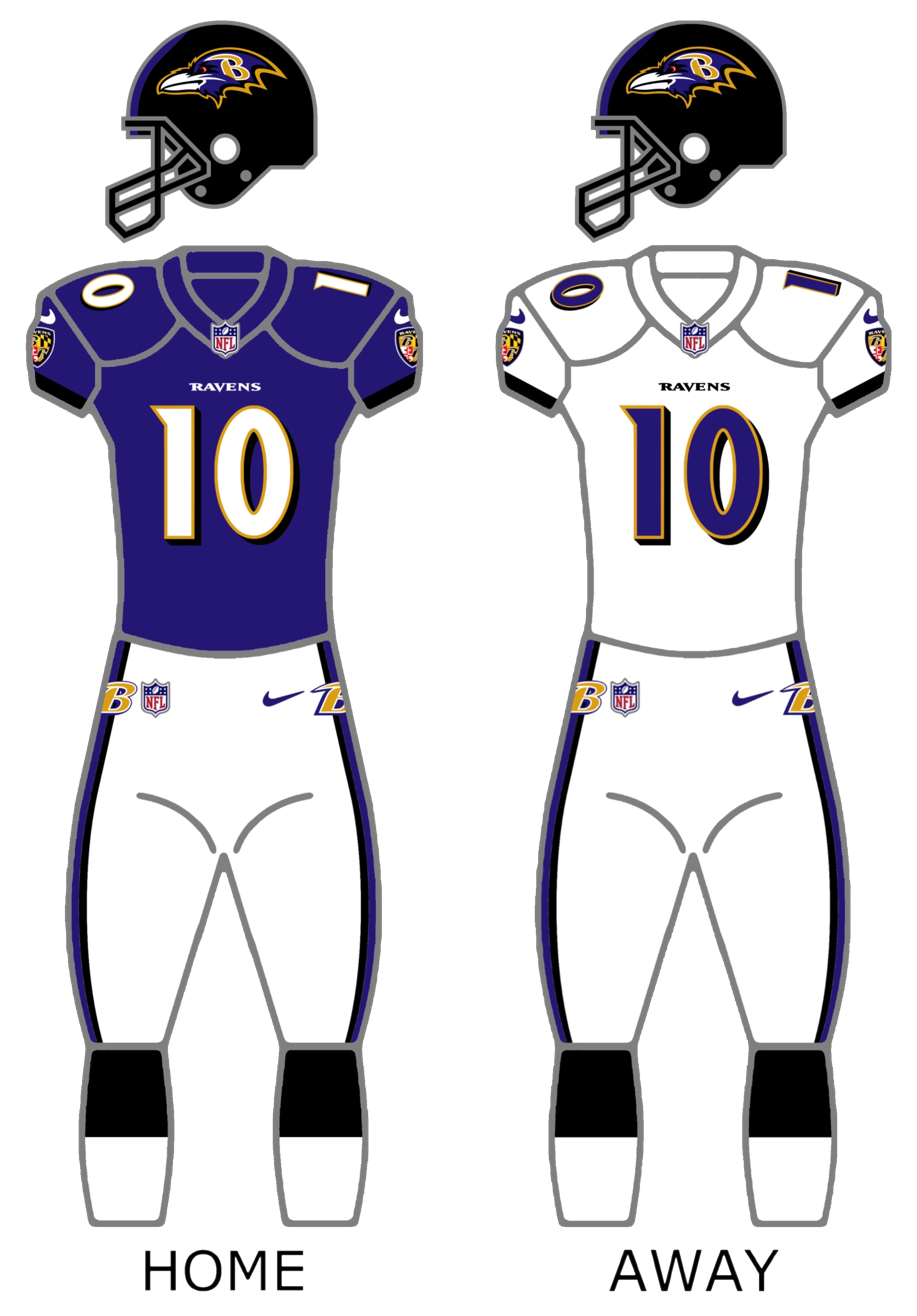

The 2002 Baltimore Ravens season was the team's seventh season in the National Football League (NFL). They were unable to improve upon their previous output of 10–6, instead winning only seven games and missing the playoffs for the first time in three years.

Running back Jamal Lewis made his return to the lineup after missing the previous season from a knee injury. Baltimore's defense took a large step back from its normally high level of play in 2002. Star linebacker Ray Lewis suffered a shoulder injury which limited him to playing in only five games during the season also standout defensive end Michael McCrary was limited to five games due to injury and would retire the following season, and the team finished 19th in scoring defense after finishing 4th in the NFL the previous year. The Ravens switched to the 3-4 defensive scheme under new coordinator Mike Nolan as Marvin Lewis left for the Washington Redskins in the off-season.

== Off-season ==
=== 2002 expansion draft ===
Baltimore Ravens selected during the expansion draft
Round	Overall	Name	Position	Expansion team
—	5	Jamie Sharper	Linebacker	Houston Texans
—	6	Jermaine Lewis	Wide receiver	Houston Texans

=== Draft ===
2002 Baltimore Ravens draft
Round	Pick	Player	Position	College	Notes
1	24	Ed Reed * ^{†}	FS	Miami (FL)	
2	52	Anthony Weaver	DE	Notre Dame	
4	112	Dave Zastudil	P	Ohio	
4	123	Ron Johnson	WR	Minnesota	
5	155	Terry Jones	TE	Alabama	
6	195	Lamont Brightful	CB	Eastern Washington	
6	206	Javin Hunter	WR	Notre Dame	
6	207	Chester Taylor	RB	Toledo	
6	209	Chad Williams	S	Southern Miss	
7	236	Wes Pate	QB	Stephen F. Austin	
Made roster † Pro Football Hall of Fame * Made at least one Pro Bowl during career

=== Undrafted free agents ===
2002 undrafted free agents of note
Player	Position	College
Alan Cox	Punter	Washington State
Gary Davis	Linebacker	New Mexico
Will Demps	Safety	San Diego State
Ma'ake Kemoeatu	Nose tackle	Utah
Mike Kraemer	Long snapper	Wisconsin–La Crosse
Tellis Redmon	Running back	Minnesota
Bart Scott	Linebacker	Southern Illinois
Yohance Scott	Cornerback	Utah
Salem Simon	Defensive tackle	Northwestern
Brian Smith	Long snapper	Hawaii
Lawrence Smith	Tackle	Tennessee State

The Ravens had lost 13 players during the offseason including several players from the 2000 Super Bowl championship team. Quarterbacks Elvis Grbac and Randall Cunningham retired, Tight End Shannon Sharpe returned to the Denver Broncos, Defensive Tackle Tony Siragusa retired, Defensive Tackle Sam Adams and Safety Rod Woodson left for the Oakland Raiders, Wide Receiver Patrick Johnson left for the Jacksonville Jaguars, Wide Receiver/return specialist Jermaine Lewis left for the Houston Texans, Punter Kyle Richardson went to the Minnesota Vikings, Running Back Terry Allen was already out of football, Wide Receiver Qadry Ismail went to the colts, Jamie Sharper went to the Texans.

== Personnel ==
=== Staff / Coaches ===
2002 Baltimore Ravens staff
Front office: Owner and CEO – Art Modell; President and coo – David Modell; Minority owner – Steve Bisciotti; Vice president of player personnel – Ozzie Newsome; Director of football administration – Pat Moriarty; Director of college scouting – Phil Savage; Director of pro personnel – James Harris; Assistant director of pro personnel – George Kokinis; Head coaches: Head coach – Brian Billick; Offensive coaches: Offensive coordinator – Matt Cavanaugh; Quarterbacks/wide receivers – David Shaw; Running backs – Matt Simon; Tight ends/assistant offensive line – Wade Harman; Offensive line – Jim Colletto	Defensive coaches: Defensive coordinator – Mike Nolan; Defensive line – Rex Ryan; Linebackers – Mike Smith; Defensive backs – Donnie Henderson; Defensive assistant – Dennis Thurman; Defensive assistant – Phil Zacharias; Special teams coaches: Special teams coordinator – Gary Zauner; Assistant special teams – Bennie Thompson; Coaches assistant – Mike Pettine; Strength and conditioning: Head athletic trainer – Bill Tessendorf; Assistant athletic trainer – Kevin Domboski; Strength and conditioning – Jeff Friday; Assistant strength and conditioning – Mark Asanovich; Assistant strength and conditioning – Paul Ricci

=== Roster ===
2002 Baltimore Ravens roster
Quarterbacks (QB): 11 Jeff Blake; 7 Chris Redman; 2 Anthony Wright; Running backs (RB): 32 Sam Gash FB; 23 Dameon Hunter; 31 Jamal Lewis; 39 Alan Ricard FB; 29 Chester Taylor KR; Wide receivers (WR): 81 Randy Hymes; 83 Ron Johnson; 87 Jeff Ogden PR; 89 Travis Taylor; 85 Milton Wynn; Tight ends (TE): 86 Todd Heap; 88 John Jones; 82 Terry Jones	Offensive linemen (OL): 66 Bennie Anderson G; 77 Ethan Brooks T; 63 Mike Collins G; 72 Damion Cook T; 62 Mike Flynn C; 64 Edwin Mulitalo G/T; 75 Jonathan Ogden T; 61 Casey Rabach C/G; 73 Lawrence Smith G; 65 Jason Thomas G/T; Defensive linemen (DL): 97 Kelly Gregg NT; 92 Maʻake Kemoeatu DE/NT; 70 David Nugent DE/NT; 91 Riddick Parker DE; 96 Adalius Thomas DE; 98 Anthony Weaver DE	Linebackers (LB): 58 Peter Boulware OLB; 90 Cornell Brown OLB; 51 Bernardo Harris ILB; 56 Edgerton Hartwell ILB; 57 Bart Scott ILB; 54 Shannon Taylor OLB; Defensive backs (DB): 28 Gary Baxter CB; 45 Lamont Brightful CB/KR/PR; 47 Will Demps FS; 37 Tom Knight CB; 21 Chris McAlister CB/PR; 42 Anthony Mitchell FS; 25 Ray Perryman FS; 24 Alvin Porter CB; 20 Ed Reed SS; 22 Robert Tate CB/KR; 38 James Trapp CB; 49 Chad Williams SS; Special teams (ST): 59 Joe Maese LS; 3 Matt Stover K; 15 Dave Zastudil P	Practice squad: 93 Nate Bolling DE; 48 Brandon Christenson TE; 6 J. R. Jenkins K; 60 Jim Jones G; 18 Marc Lester WR; Reserve: 94 Marques Douglas DE (IR); 84 Javin Hunter WR (Susp.); 52 Ray Lewis LB (IR); 99 Michael McCrary DE (IR); 80 Brandon Stokley WR (IR); Rookies in italics 53 active, 5 reserve, 5 practice squad

== Preseason ==
=== Schedule ===
Week	Date	Opponent	Result	Record
1	August 9	Detroit Lions	W 12–6	1–0
2	August 15	New York Jets	L 16–34	1–1
3	August 23	at Philadelphia Eagles	W 13–12	2–1
4	August 29	at New York Giants	L 0–13	2–2

== Regular season ==
=== Schedule ===
Apart from their AFC North division games, the Ravens played against the AFC South and NFC South according to the NFL's new conference rotation, and played the Broncos and Dolphins based on 2001 standings with respect to the newly aligned divisions.

Week	Date	Opponent	Result	TV	Time _{(ET)}	Record	Attendance
1	September 8	at Carolina Panthers	**L** 7–10	CBS	1:00 pm	0–1	70,386
2	September 15	Tampa Bay Buccaneers	**L** 0–25	FOX	1:00 pm	0–2	69,304
3	Bye						
4	September 30	Denver Broncos	**W** 34–23	ABC	9:07 pm	1–2	69,538
5	October 6	at **Cleveland Browns**	**W** 26–21	ESPN	8:37 pm	2–2	73,688
6	October 13	at Indianapolis Colts	**L** 20–22	CBS	1:00 pm	2–3	56,174
7	October 20	Jacksonville Jaguars	**W** 17–10	CBS	1:00 pm	3–3	69,173
8	October 27	**Pittsburgh Steelers**	**L** 18–31	CBS	1:00 pm	3–4	69,638
9	November 3	at Atlanta Falcons	**L** 17–20	CBS	1:00 pm	3–5	68,532
10	November 10	**Cincinnati Bengals**	**W** 38–27	CBS	1:00 pm	4–5	69,024
11	November 17	at Miami Dolphins	**L** 7–26	CBS	4:15 pm	4–6	73,013
12	November 24	Tennessee Titans	**W** 13–12	CBS	1:00 pm	5–6	69,365
13	December 1	at **Cincinnati Bengals**	**W** 27–23	CBS	1:00 pm	6–6	44,878
14	December 8	New Orleans Saints	**L** 25–37	FOX	4:05 pm	6–7	69,334
15	December 15	at Houston Texans	**W** 23–19	CBS	1:00 pm	7–7	70,108
16	December 22	**Cleveland Browns**	**L** 13–14	CBS	4:15 pm	7–8	69,348
17	December 29	at **Pittsburgh Steelers**	**L** 31–34	CBS	1:00 pm	7–9	61,961
Note: Intra-divisional opponents are in **bold** text

=== Game summaries ===
==== Week 2: vs Tampa Bay Buccaneers ====
Week 2: Tampa Bay Buccaneers at Baltimore Ravens

Quarter	1	2	3	4	Total
**Buccaneers**	10	3	5	7	**25**
Ravens	0	0	0	0	**0**

at Ravens Stadium, Baltimore, Maryland

- Date: September 15
- Game time: 1:00 p.m. EDT
- Game weather: Partly Cloudy, 78 °F (26 °C)
- Game attendance: 69,304
- Referee: Terry McAulay
- TV announcers (Fox): Sam Rosen and Bill Maas
- Recap, Game Book

Game information

**First quarter**

- TB – Martín Gramática 36-yard field goal, 7:39. Buccaneers 3–0. **Drive: 12 plays, 60 yards, 7:21.**
- TB – Karl Williams 56-yard punt return (Martín Gramática kick), 1:54. Buccaneers 10–0.

**Second quarter**

- TB – Martin Gramatica 30-yard field goal, 3:51. Buccaneers 13–0. **Drive: 17 plays, 82 yards, 8:25.**

**Third quarter**

- TB – Chris Redman fumble out of bounds in the end zone for a safety, 14:44. Buccaneers 15–0.
- TB – Martin Gramatica 30-yard field goal, 8:13. Buccaneers 18–0. **Drive: 11 plays, 48 yards, 6:31.**

**Fourth quarter**

- TB – Derrick Brooks 97-yard interception return (Martín Gramática kick), 1:06. Buccaneers 25–0.

**Top passers**

- TB – Brad Johnson – 24/31, 211 yards
- BAL – Chris Redman – 16/38, 141 yards, INT

**Top rushers**

- TB – Michael Pittman – 13 rushes, 37 yards
- BAL – Jamal Lewis – 17 rushes, 53 yards

**Top receivers**

- TB – Michael Pittman – 6 receptions, 58 yards
- BAL – Brandon Stokley – 4 receptions, 57 yards

==== Week 11: at Miami Dolphins ====
Week 11: Baltimore Ravens (4–5) at Miami Dolphins (5–4) – Game summary

Quarter	1	2	3	4	Total
Ravens	0	7	0	0	**7**
**Dolphins**	7	10	3	6	**26**

at Pro Player Stadium, Miami Gardens, Florida

- Date: November 17, 2002
- Game time: 4:15 p.m.
- Game weather: Cloudy, 68 °F (20 °C)
- Game attendance: 73,013
- Referee: Walt Coleman (65)
- TV announcers (CBS): Kevin Harlan, Randy Cross, and Beasley Reece
- Recap, Game Book

Game information

**First quarter**

- MIA – Ricky Williams 2-yard run (Olindo Mare kick), 3:43. Dolphins 7–0. **Drive: 8 plays, 88 yards, 4:25.**

**Second quarter**

- BAL – Travis Taylor 28-yard pass from Jeff Blake (Matt Stover kick), 9:08. Tied 7–7. **Drive: 4 plays, 37 yards, 1:40.**
- MIA – Ray Lucas 1-yard run (Olindo Mare kick), 6:19. Dolphins 14–7. **Drive: 6 plays, 61 yards, 2:49.**
- MIA – Olindo Mare 42-yard field goal, 0:08. Dolphins 17–7. **Drive: 11 plays, 43 yards, 3:12.**

**Third quarter**

- MIA – Olindo Mare 49-yard field goal, 5:07. Dolphins 20–7. **Drive: 4 plays, 9 yards, 1:50.**

**Fourth quarter**

- MIA – Ricky Williams 4-yard run (pass failed), 9:02. Dolphins 26–7. **Drive: 9 plays, 82 yards, 5:11.**

**Top passers**

- BAL – Jeff Blake – 14/28, 127 yards, TD, INT
- MIA – Ray Lucas – 18/26, 221 yards

**Top rushers**

- BAL – Jamal Lewis – 17 rushes, 47 yards
- MIA – Ricky Williams – 26 rushes, 102 yards, 2 TD

**Top receivers**

- BAL – Travis Taylor – 4 receptions, 48 yards, TD
- MIA – James McKnight – 4 receptions, 59 yards

=== Standings ===
==== Division ====
AFC North
	W	L	T	PCT	DIV	CONF	PF	PA	STK
^{(3)} Pittsburgh Steelers	10	5	1	.656	6–0	8–4	390	345	W3
^{(6)} Cleveland Browns	9	7	0	.563	3–3	7–5	344	320	W2
Baltimore Ravens	7	9	0	.438	3–3	7–5	316	354	L2
Cincinnati Bengals	2	14	0	.125	0–6	1–11	279	456	L1

==== Conference ====
AFC
#	Team	Division	W	L	T	PCT	DIV	CONF	SOS	SOV
**Division leaders**
1 (Note: Oakland finished ahead of Tennessee based on head-to-head victory.)	Oakland Raiders	West	11	5	0	.688	4–2	9–3	.529	.531
2	Tennessee Titans	South	11	5	0	.688	6–0	9–3	.479	.474
3	Pittsburgh Steelers	North	10	5	1	.656	6–0	8–4	.486	.451
4 (Note: N.Y. Jets finished ahead of New England based on win percentage in common games (8–4 to 7–5) after both finished ahead of Miami based on division record (4–2 to 2–4).)	New York Jets	East	9	7	0	.563	4–2	6–6	.500	.500
**Wild Cards**
5	Indianapolis Colts	South	10	6	0	.625	4–2	8–4	.479	.400
6 (Note: Cleveland finished ahead of Denver and New England based on conference record (7–5 vs 5–7/6–6))	Cleveland Browns	North	9	7	0	.563	3–3	7–5	.486	.413
**Did not qualify for the postseason**
7 (Note: Denver finished ahead of New England based on head-to-head victory.)	Denver Broncos	West	9	7	0	.563	3–3	5–7	.527	.486
8 (Note: New England finished ahead of Miami based on division record (4–2 to 2–4).)	New England Patriots	East	9	7	0	.563	4–2	6–6	.525	.455
9	Miami Dolphins	East	9	7	0	.563	2–4	7–5	.508	.486
10 (Note: Buffalo finished ahead of San Diego based on head-to-head victory.)	Buffalo Bills	East	8	8	0	.500	2–4	5–7	.473	.352
11 (Note: San Diego finished ahead of Kansas City based on division record (3–3 to 2–4).)	San Diego Chargers	West	8	8	0	.500	3–3	6–6	.492	.453
12	Kansas City Chiefs	West	8	8	0	.500	2–4	6–6	.527	.516
13	Baltimore Ravens	North	7	9	0	.438	3–3	7–5	.506	.384
14	Jacksonville Jaguars	South	6	10	0	.375	1–5	4–8	.506	.438
15	Houston Texans	South	4	12	0	.250	1–5	2–10	.518	.492
16	Cincinnati Bengals	North	2	14	0	.125	0–6	1–11	.537	.406
**Tiebreakers** (Note: When breaking ties for three or more teams under the NFL's rules, they are first broken within divisions, then comparing only the highest ranked remaining team from each division.)
