= 2000 Baltimore Ravens season =

US football sports team season (won Super Bowl)

- Owner: Art Modell
- General manager: Ozzie Newsome
- Head coach: Brian Billick
- Offensive coordinator: Matt Cavanaugh
- Defensive coordinator: Marvin Lewis
- Home stadium: PSINet Stadium

Results
- Record: 12–4
- Division place: 2nd AFC Central
- Playoffs: Won Wild Card Playoffs (vs. Broncos) 21–3; Won Divisional Playoffs (at Titans) 24–10; Won AFC Championship (at Raiders) 16–3; Won Super Bowl XXXV (vs. Giants) 34–7
- All-Pros: OT Jonathan Ogden (1st team); LB Ray Lewis (1st team); DT Sam Adams (2nd team); DE Rob Burnett (2nd team); FS Rod Woodson (2nd team); K Matt Stover (1st team)
- Pro Bowlers: FS Rod Woodson; DT Sam Adams; K Matt Stover; T Jonathan Ogden; LB Ray Lewis

Uniform
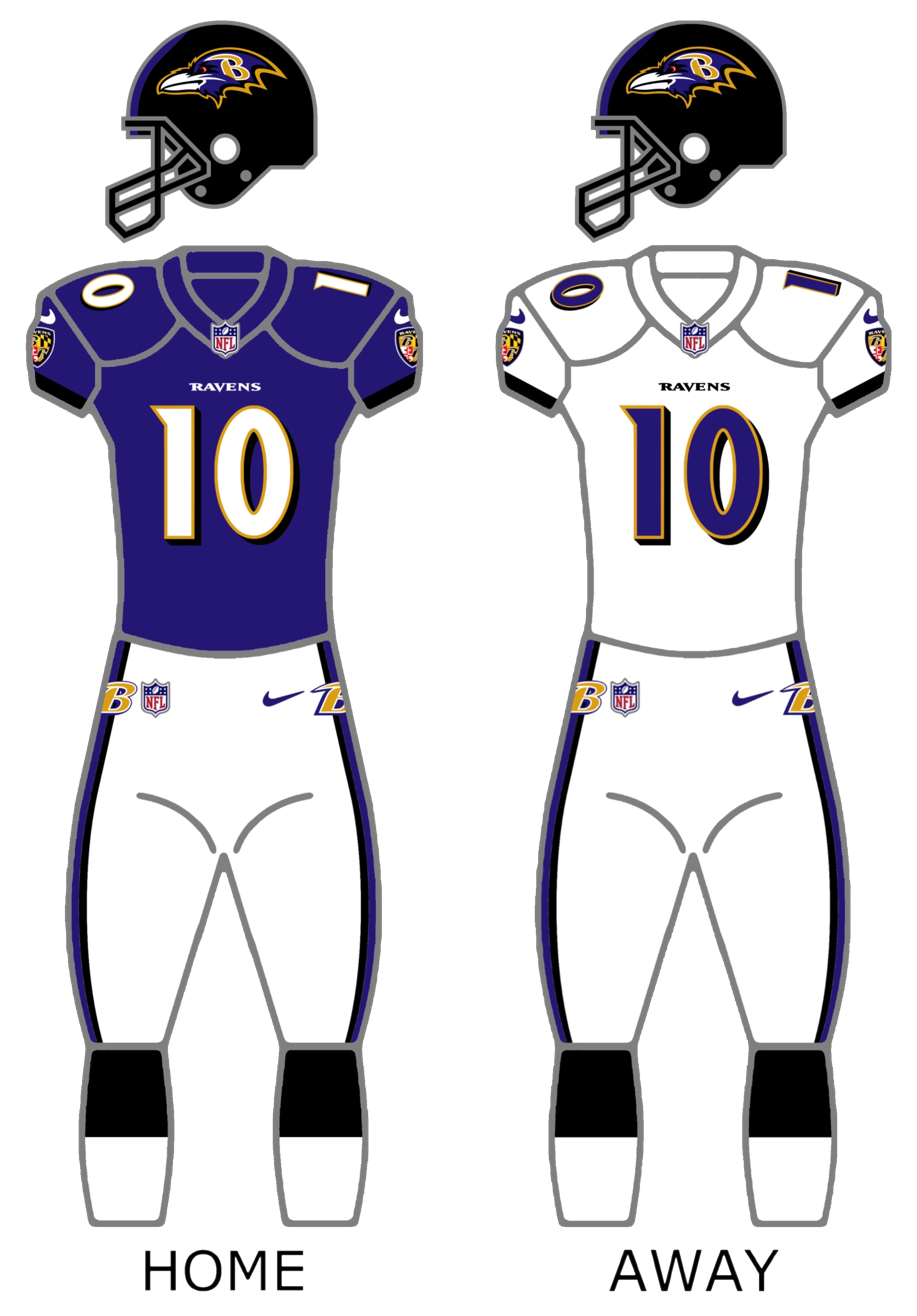

The 2000 season was the Baltimore Ravens' fifth in the National Football League (NFL) and the second under head coach Brian Billick. The Ravens ended the season as Super Bowl XXXV champions.

The Ravens finished the year with a 12–4 record (their first winning season), finishing 2nd in the AFC Central and qualifying for the playoffs as a wild card team. In the franchise's first post-season appearance, the Ravens won all three games, culminating in a trip to Tampa, Florida for Super Bowl XXXV, where they defeated the New York Giants, 34–7. The team's defense, which currently holds the all-time league record for fewest points allowed in a 16-game regular season with just 165 (10.3 points per game), is considered among the greatest of all time, including 4 games where they kept their opponents from scoring.

Though just five seasons removed from the relocation from Cleveland, only three players (Matt Stover, Rob Burnett, Larry Webster) and zero coaches remained from the 1995 Cleveland Browns roster and staff.

The 2000 Ravens ranked #22 on the 100 greatest teams of all time presented by the NFL on its 100th anniversary. They were the highest ranked team which did not win its division, and also the highest that had to win 4 playoff games.

Despite the team's defensive dominance, Baltimore only faced three teams in the regular season that finished with a winning record, the Steelers (9–7), the Dolphins (11–5), and the Titans (who finished with the best record in the NFL, 13–3).

== Offseason ==
The Ravens spent most of the offseason concerned with the status of their star linebacker Ray Lewis, who, along with two acquaintances, was arrested and charged with murder after an incident outside an Atlanta nightclub on January 31, 2000. On June 5, a plea bargain was struck, and murder and aggravated assault charges were dropped in exchange for Lewis' testimony against his companions. Lewis pleaded guilty to one count of obstruction of justice and was sentenced to one year of probation. The NFL fined Lewis $250,000.

The Ravens made some key moves in the offseason to help bolster the team. They signed defensive tackle Sam Adams and tight end Shannon Sharpe in free agency. They used the fifth overall pick in the first round of the 2000 NFL draft on running back Jamal Lewis.

Additions	Subtractions
TE Shannon Sharpe (Broncos)	QB Scott Mitchell (Bengals)
DT Sam Adams (Seahawks)	RB Errict Rhett (Browns)
TE Ben Coates (Patriots)	QB Stoney Case (Lions)
FB Sam Gash (Bills)	CB DeRon Jenkins (Chargers)
QB Trent Dilfer (Buccaneers)	G Jeff Blackshear (Chiefs)
T Orlando Bobo (Browns)	T Everett Lindsay (Browns)
CB Robert Bailey (Lions)	DE Fernando Smith (Rams)
G Kipp Vickers (Redskins)	

=== Draft ===
2000 Baltimore Ravens draft
Round	Pick	Player	Position	College	Notes
1	5	Jamal Lewis *	RB	Tennessee	
1	10	Travis Taylor	WR	Florida	
3	75	Chris Redman	QB	Louisville	
5	148	Richard Mercier	OG	Miami (FL)	
6	186	Adalius Thomas *	LB	Southern Miss	
6	191	Cedric Woodard	DT	Texas	
Made roster † Pro Football Hall of Fame * Made at least one Pro Bowl during career

=== Undrafted free agents ===
2000 undrafted free agents of note
Player	Position	College
DeJuan Alfonzo	Defensive back	Indiana State
Dan McGuire	Kicker	Boston College

== Season summary ==
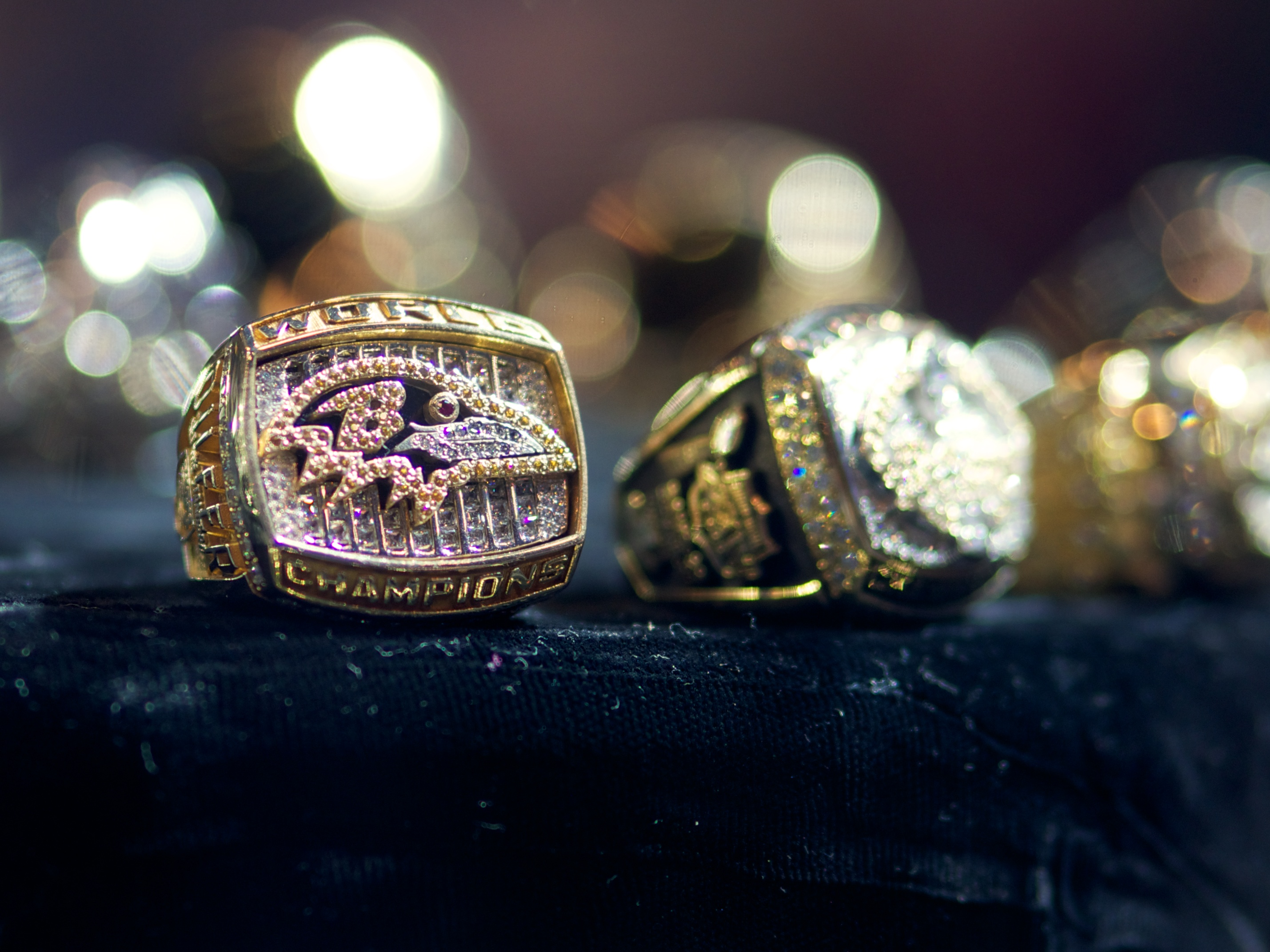
2000 Baltimore Ravens Super Bowl XXXV Ring

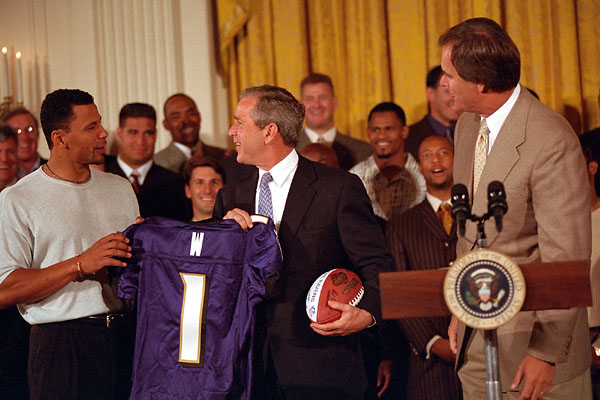
Rod Woodson presents a jersey to President George W. Bush during the Ravens' White House visit on June 8, 2001.

The Ravens started the season with a 5–1 mark, with three of their victories coming by shutout. Despite the great play of the defense, the offense had major struggles after the first month of the season. Following a 37–0 victory over the Cincinnati Bengals, the Ravens would not score a touchdown for five consecutive games. The Ravens won the first two of these games due to their defense and field goals from kicker Matt Stover, then lost the next three, including a critical division loss at home to the Tennessee Titans. During this game, quarterback Tony Banks was benched in favor of Trent Dilfer, who would take over for the rest of the season. After a loss at home to Pittsburgh to fall to 5–4, the Ravens broke both their touchdown-less streak and losing streak against the Bengals the next week. It would be the first of seven straight wins to end the regular season.

The Ravens finished one game behind the Titans in the AFC Central, so the Ravens had to begin their playoff run at home in the wild card round against the Denver Broncos. The team cruised to a 21–3 victory, setting up a date with the Titans the following week in Nashville. The Ravens prevailed 24–10, with linebacker Ray Lewis's 50-yard interception return for a touchdown clinching the game. The team then traveled to Oakland to meet the Raiders for the right to represent the AFC in the Super Bowl. The Ravens advanced to their first Super Bowl after a 16–3 victory, as the defense held Oakland, the league's top rushing offense during the season, to just 24 yards on the ground. The Ravens easily defeated the Giants in Super Bowl XXXV, 34–7, as Ray Lewis led another dominant performance by the defense and was named most valuable player of the game for his efforts.

The Ravens relied heavily on their defense, which set several NFL records during the 2000 season, including fewest points ever allowed during a 16-game season (165) and fewest rushing yards ever allowed (970). The defense also forced more turnovers than any team in the league that year (49), and Ray Lewis was named NFL Defensive Player of the Year by the Associated Press. Starting cornerbacks Chris McAlister and Duane Starks combined to intercept ten passes, and defensive end Rob Burnett contributed with 10.5 sacks. Defensive tackle Sam Adams was voted to the Pro Bowl and first-team All-Pro, as was safety Rod Woodson, who had four interceptions and ranked second on the team in tackles during the regular season. The defense also had plenty of other key players, including linebacker Jamie Sharper, outside linebacker Peter Boulware, and defensive tackle Tony Siragusa. Siragusa played alongside Sam Adams, as the two men combining for nearly 700 pounds and were big factors in the Ravens setting the run-stopping record.

Offensively, the Ravens relied heavily on the running game. Rookie running back Jamal Lewis led the way with 1,364 yards and veteran Priest Holmes added 588 rushing yards. The passing game was rather pedestrian (23rd in yards passing), but Trent Dilfer brought stability to the position when he took over for Tony Banks mid-season. Tight end Shannon Sharpe, acquired as an unrestricted free agent from Denver during the offseason, was the team's leading pass receiver with 67 catches for 810 yards. Left tackle Jonathan Ogden was selected first-team All-Pro, and widely regarded as the league's best offensive lineman. The Ravens also had one of the best special teams units in the NFL. Return specialist Jermaine Lewis scored two touchdowns on punt returns during the season, and ran back a kickoff for a touchdown in the Super Bowl. Placekicker Matt Stover made 35 field goals on 39 attempts and was voted to the Pro Bowl and first team All-Pro.

The 2000 Ravens team marked Baltimore's first playoff appearance in 23 years, since the Baltimore Colts were AFC East champions and made it to the AFC Divisional game in 1977.

== Personnel ==
=== Staff / Coaches ===
2000 Baltimore Ravens staff
Front office: Owner – Art Modell; Head coaches: Head coach – Brian Billick; Assistant head coach/secondary – Steve Shafer; Offensive coaches: Offensive coordinator – Matt Cavanaugh; Running backs – Matt Simon; Wide receivers – Milt Jackson; Tight ends/assistant offensive line – Wade Harman; Offensive line – Jim Colletto	Defensive coaches: Defensive coordinator – Marvin Lewis; Defensive line – Rex Ryan; Linebackers – Jack Del Rio; Defensive backs – Donnie Henderson; Defensive assistant/defensive line – Mike Smith; Special teams coaches: Special teams coordinator – Russ Purnell; Assistant special teams – Paul McCord; Assistant special teams – Bennie Thompson; Strength and conditioning: Head athletic trainer – Bill Tessendorf; Head strength and conditioning – Jeff Friday; Assistant strength and conditioning – Chip Morton; Assistant strength and conditioning – Paul Ricci

=== Final roster ===
2000 Baltimore Ravens roster
Quarterbacks (QB): 12 Tony Banks; 8 Trent Dilfer; 7 Chris Redman; Running backs (RB): 29 Chuck Evans; 32 Sam Gash FB; 33 Priest Holmes; 31 Jamal Lewis; Wide receivers (WR): 86 Billy Davis; 87 Qadry Ismail; 83 Patrick Johnson; 84 Jermaine Lewis; 11 Marcus Nash; 80 Brandon Stokley; Tight ends (TE): 81 Ben Coates; 85 John Jones; 82 Shannon Sharpe	Offensive linemen (OL): 74 Orlando Bobo G; 62 Mike Flynn C/G; 71 Spencer Folau T; 60 Jeff Mitchell C; 64 Edwin Mulitalo G; 75 Jonathan Ogden T; 70 Harry Swayne T; 77 Kipp Vickers G; 72 Sammy Williams T; Defensive linemen (DL): 95 Sam Adams DT; 90 Rob Burnett DE; 91 Lional Dalton DT; 99 Michael McCrary DE; 98 Tony Siragusa DT; 96 Adalius Thomas DE; 93 Keith Washington DE; 79 Larry Webster DT	Linebackers (LB): 58 Peter Boulware OLB; 57 O. J. Brigance MLB; 51 Cornell Brown OLB; 56 Anthony Davis OLB; 50 Brad Jackson OLB; 52 Ray Lewis MLB; 55 Jamie Sharper OLB; Defensive backs (DB): 35 Robert Bailey CB; 45 Corey Harris CB; 20 Kim Herring SS; 25 Clarence Love CB; 21 Chris McAlister CB; 42 Anthony Mitchell FS; 43 Anthony Poindexter SS; 22 Duane Starks CB; 38 James Trapp CB; 26 Rod Woodson FS; Special teams (ST): 66 John Hudson LS; 5 Kyle Richardson P; 3 Matt Stover K	Practice squad: 46 Robert Arnaud RB; 73 Kelly Gregg DT; 59 Rod Payne C; 39 Alan Ricard FB; 16 Germany Thompson WR; Reserve: 30 Obafemi Ayanbadejo FB (IR); 40 Pedro Edison TE (IR); 89 Travis Taylor WR (IR); 88 Frank Wainright LS (IR); 54 Calvin Wilkinson LB (IR); Rookies in italics 53 active, 5 reserve, 5 practice squad

== Preseason ==
Week	Date	Opponent	Result	Record	Venue	Recap
1	August 5	Philadelphia Eagles	W 16–13	1–0	PSINet Stadium	Recap
2	August 12	New York Jets	W 10–0	2–0	PSINet Stadium	Recap
3	August 18	at Carolina Panthers	W 24–13	3–0	Ericsson Stadium	Recap
4	August 25	at New York Giants	W 24–17	4–0	Giants Stadium	Recap

== Regular season ==
Week	Date	Opponent	Result	Record	Venue	Recap
1	September 3	at **Pittsburgh Steelers**	**W** 16–0	1–0	Three Rivers Stadium	Recap
2	September 10	**Jacksonville Jaguars**	**W** 39–36	2–0	PSINet Stadium	Recap
3	September 17	at Miami Dolphins	**L** 6–19	2–1	Pro Player Stadium	Recap
4	September 24	**Cincinnati Bengals**	**W** 37–0	3–1	PSINet Stadium	Recap
5	October 1	at **Cleveland Browns**	**W** 12–0	4–1	Cleveland Browns Stadium	Recap
6	October 8	at **Jacksonville Jaguars**	**W** 15–10	5–1	Alltel Stadium	Recap
7	October 15	at Washington Redskins	**L** 3–10	5–2	FedExField	Recap
8	October 22	**Tennessee Titans**	**L** 6–14	5–3	PSINet Stadium	Recap
9	October 29	**Pittsburgh Steelers**	**L** 6–9	5–4	PSINet Stadium	Recap
10	November 5	at **Cincinnati Bengals**	**W** 27–7	6–4	Paul Brown Stadium	Recap
11	November 12	at **Tennessee Titans**	**W** 24–23	7–4	Adelphia Coliseum	Recap
12	November 19	Dallas Cowboys	**W** 27–0	8–4	PSINet Stadium	Recap
13	November 26	**Cleveland Browns**	**W** 44–7	9–4	PSINet Stadium	Recap
14	Bye					
15	December 10	San Diego Chargers	**W** 24–3	10–4	PSINet Stadium	Recap
16	December 17	at Arizona Cardinals	**W** 13–7	11–4	Sun Devil Stadium	Recap
17	December 24	New York Jets	**W** 34–20	12–4	PSINet Stadium	Recap
Note: Intra-division opponents are in **bold** text.

=== Game summaries ===
==== Week 1: at Pittsburgh Steelers ====
Week 1: Baltimore Ravens at Pittsburgh Steelers – Game summary

Quarter	1	2	3	4	Total
**Ravens**	10	3	3	0	**16**
Steelers	0	0	0	0	**0**

at Three Rivers Stadium, Pittsburgh, Pennsylvania

- Date: September 3
- Game time: 1:00 pm. EST
- Game weather: Clear, 73 °F (23 °C)
- Game attendance: 55,049
- TV announcers (CBS): Don Criqui and Steve Tasker
- Recap

Game information

**First quarter**

- BAL – Matt Stover 23-yard field goal, Ravens 3–0
- BAL – Qadry Ismail 53-yard pass from Tony Banks (Matt Stover kick), Ravens 10–0

**Second quarter**

- BAL – Matt Stover 26-yard field goal, Ravens 13–0

**Third quarter**

- BAL – Matt Stover 33-yard field goal, Ravens 16–0

**Fourth quarter**

- No scoring plays.

**Top passers**

- BAL – Tony Banks – 18/32, 199 yards, TD
- PIT – Kent Graham – 17/38, 199 yards

**Top rushers**

- BAL – Priest Holmes – 27 rushes, 119 yards
- PIT – Richard Huntley – 7 rushes, 31 yards

**Top receivers**

- BAL – Qadry Ismail – 7 receptions, 102 yards, TD
- PIT – Plaxico Burress – 4 receptions, 77 yards

In the opening game for Baltimore's regular season, they squared off against division rivals Pittsburgh Steelers at their turf. In a game where the Ravens had 336 yards of total offense, they first scored points with a field goal kick from Matt Stover. Later in the first quarter, Qadry Ismail would catch a pass from Tony Banks for seven more points. After another field goal kick, the Steelers were being shut out by the end of halftime, 13–0. The final score in the game resulted from another field goal from Stover, and the final score resulted with the Ravens winning 16–0. With this win, the Ravens began their season at 1–0.

==== Week 2: vs. Jacksonville Jaguars ====
Week 2: Jacksonville Jaguars at Baltimore Ravens – Game summary

Quarter	1	2	3	4	Total
Jaguars	17	6	3	10	**36**
**Ravens**	0	7	15	17	**39**

at PSINet Stadium, Baltimore, Maryland

- Date: September 10
- Game time: 1:00 pm. EST
- Game weather: Clear, 74 °F (23 °C)
- Game attendance: 63,843
- Referee: Johnny Grier
- TV announcers (CBS): Verne Lundquist, Dan Dierdorf, and Bonnie Bernstein
- Recap

Game information

**First quarter**

- JAX – Mike Hollis 36-yard field goal, Jaguars 3–0
- JAX – Jimmy Smith 45-yard pass from Mark Brunell (Mike Hollis kick), Jaguars 10–0
- JAX – Jimmy Smith 43-yard pass from Mark Brunell (Mike Hollis kick), Jaguars 17–0

**Second quarter**

- BAL – Travis Taylor 14-yard pass from Tony Banks (Matt Stover kick), Jaguars 17–7
- JAX – Mike Hollis 45-yard field goal, Jaguars 20–7
- JAX – Mike Hollis 48-yard field goal, Jaguars 23–7

**Third quarter**

- BAL – Travis Taylor 23-yard pass from Tony Banks (Ben Coates pass from Tony Banks), Jaguars 23–15
- JAX – Mike Hollis 34-yard field goal, Jaguars 26–15
- BAL – Obafemi Ayanbadejo 5-yard pass from Tony Banks (Matt Stover kick), Jaguars 26–22

**Fourth quarter**

- BAL – Jermaine Lewis 12-yard pass from Tony Banks (Matt Stover kick), Ravens 29–26
- BAL – Matt Stover 44-yard field goal, Ravens 32–26
- JAX – Mike Hollis 48-yard field goal, Ravens 32–29
- JAX – Jimmy Smith 40-yard pass from Mark Brunell (Mike Hollis kick), Jaguars 36–32
- BAL – Shannon Sharpe 29-yard pass from Tony Banks (Matt Stover kick), Ravens 39–36

**Top passers**

- JAX – Mark Brunell – 28/50, 386 yards, 3 TD, 2 INT
- BAL – Tony Banks – 23/40, 262 yards, 5 TD, 2 INT

**Top rushers**

- JAX – Stacey Mack – 11 rushes, 36 yards
- BAL – Priest Holmes – 10 rushes, 54 yards

**Top receivers**

- JAX – Jimmy Smith – 15 receptions, 291 yards, 3 TD
- BAL – Travis Taylor – 4 receptions, 80 yards, 2 TD

At the Ravens first home game, Baltimore trailed the Jacksonville Jaguars for the majority of the game, where the home team gained another 300+ yards of total offense. The first quarter was dominated by Jacksonville, where the time period ended with two touchdown passes from Mark Brunell to Jimmy Smith and a field goal from Mike Hollis (17–0). Baltimore put up their first points in the second quarter with a touchdown pass from Tony Banks to Travis Taylor. However, the first half ended with two more field goals from the Jaguars. The third quarter began with the Ravens trailing 23–7. Two further touchdowns by the Ravens (one which was for two extra points) and a field goal from Jaguars put the home team with less than a touchdown differential. In the continuing scoring shootout, the Ravens scored first in the fourth quarter with a touchdown to lead for the first time during the entire game, 29–26. By the later portion of the quarter, the Jaguars had surpassed Baltimore once more at 36–32. In the last scoring drive of the game, Shannon Sharpe completed a 29-yard pass from Banks to defeat Jacksonville, 39–36. With this win, Baltimore's record elevated to 2–0.

==== Week 3: at Miami Dolphins ====
Week 3: Baltimore Ravens at Miami Dolphins – Game summary

Quarter	1	2	3	4	Total
Ravens	0	0	3	3	**6**
**Dolphins**	3	3	7	6	**19**

at Pro Player Stadium, Miami, Florida

- Date: September 17
- Game time: 8:20 pm. EST
- Game weather: Clear, 83 °F (28 °C)
- Game attendance: 73,464
- Referee: Jeff Triplette
- TV announcers (ESPN): Mike Patrick, Joe Theismann, Paul Maguire & Suzy Kolber
- Recap

Game information

**First quarter**

- MIA – Olindo Mare 42-yard field goal, Dolphins 3–0

**Second quarter**

- MIA – Olindo Mare 41-yard field goal, Dolphins 6–0

**Third quarter**

- MIA – Lamar Smith 7-yard run (Olindo Mare kick), Dolphins 13–0
- BAL – Matt Stover 27-yard field goal, Dolphins 13–3

**Fourth quarter**

- MIA – Lamar Smith 8-yard pass from Jay Fiedler (kick failed), Dolphins 19–3
- BAL – Matt Stover 33-yard field goal, Dolphins 19–6

**Top passers**

- BAL – Tony Banks – 19/31, 189 yards, INT
- MIA – Lamar Smith – 11/16, 160 yards, TD, INT

**Top rushers**

- BAL – Jamal Lewis – 9 rushes, 76 yards
- MIA – Lamar Smith – 23 rushes, 63 yards

**Top receivers**

- BAL – Shannon Sharpe – 5 receptions, 56 yards
- MIA – Lamar Smith – 3 receptions, 47 yards, TD

In week 3, the Ravens and the Miami Dolphins gained little offense in a defensive struggle for both teams. The first half was highlighted by Dolphins placekicker Olindo Mare's two field goals. The Ravens attacked back during the second half, with two field goals of their own by Matt Stover; however, with a touchdown pass from Jay Fiedler to Lamar Smith and a rushing touchdown from the latter, the Dolphins overcame Baltimore 19–6. In a game where the Ravens got just above 250 yards of total offense, Baltimore ultimately fell to a 2–1 record.

==== Week 4: vs. Cincinnati Bengals ====
Week 4: Cincinnati Bengals at Baltimore Ravens – Game summary

Quarter	1	2	3	4	Total
Bengals	0	0	0	0	**0**
**Ravens**	10	14	3	10	**37**

at PSINet Stadium, Baltimore, Maryland

- Date: September 24
- Game time: 1:00 pm. EST
- Game weather: Clear, 70 °F (21 °C)
- Game attendance: 68,481
- TV announcers (CBS): Gus Johnson and Brent Jones
- Recap

Game information

**First quarter**

- BAL – Matt Stover 30-yard field goal, Ravens 3–0
- BAL – Travis Taylor 8-yard pass from Tony Banks (Matt Stover kick), Ravens 10–0

**Second quarter**

- BAL – Jamal Lewis 11-yard run (Matt Stover kick), Ravens 17–0
- BAL – Shannon Sharpe 1-yard pass from Tony Banks (Matt Stover Kick), Ravens 24–0

**Third quarter**

- BAL – Matt Stover 37-yard field goal, Ravens 27–0

**Fourth quarter**

- BAL – Obafemi Ayanbadejo 1-yard run (Matt Stover kick), Ravens 34–0
- BAL – Matt Stover 19-yard field goal, Ravens 37–0

**Top passers**

- CIN – Scott Mitchell – 14/23, 97 yards, 2 INT
- BAL – Tony Banks – 20/36, 196 yards, 2 TD

**Top rushers**

- CIN – Corey Dillon – 12 rushes, 9 yards
- BAL – Jamal Lewis – 25 rushes, 116 yards

**Top receivers**

- CIN – Clif Groce – 4 receptions, 24 yards
- BAL – Priest Holmes – 4 receptions, 48 yards

In an attempt to redeem their road loss to the Dolphins, the Ravens faced division rivals Cincinnati Bengals. In a complete shut out, the Ravens gained a near 400 yards (391 yards exact) in a game where the defense shut down the Bengals for only 94 yards of offense. During the first half, the Ravens scored three touchdowns (two passes from Tony Banks to Travis Taylor and Shannon Sharpe, and a rush by Jamal Lewis) and a field goal by Matt Stover. The second half ended with two more field goals and a rushing touchdown from Obafemi Ayanbadejo to finish with a score of 37–0. With this win, Baltimore's record elevated to 3–1.

==== Week 5: at Cleveland Browns ====
Week 5: Baltimore Ravens at Cleveland Browns – Game summary

Quarter	1	2	3	4	Total
**Ravens**	3	6	3	0	**12**
Browns	0	0	0	0	**0**

at Cleveland Browns Stadium, Cleveland, Ohio

- Date: October 1
- Game time: 1:00 pm. EST
- Game weather: Clear, 62 °F (17 °C)
- Game attendance: 73,018
- TV announcers (CBS): Ian Eagle and Mark May
- Recap

Game information

**First quarter**

- BAL – Matt Stover 45-yard field goal, Ravens 3–0

**Second quarter**

- BAL – Matt Stover 30-yard field goal, Ravens 6–0
- BAL – Matt Stover 44-yard field goal, Ravens 9–0

**Third quarter**

- BAL – Matt Stover 22-yard field goal, Ravens 12–0

**Fourth quarter**

- No scoring plays.

**Top passers**

- BAL – Tony Banks – 18/34, 169 yards, INT
- CLE – Tim Couch – 20/35, 203 yards, 3 INT

**Top rushers**

- BAL – Jamal Lewis – 13 rushes, 86 yards
- CLE – Travis Prentic – 7 rushes, 11 yards

**Top receivers**

- BAL – Shannon Sharpe – 6 receptions, 83 yards
- CLE – David Patten – 7 receptions, 113 yards

The Ravens began a five-game touchdown drought with their matchup against Cleveland. In a game dominated by both defenses, the Ravens allowed just under 250 offensive yards. The first half ended with three field goals from kicker Matt Stover, with the longest being from 45 yards in order to advance the Ravens to the locker room at 9–0. The final scoring in the game came during the third quarter when Stover kicked another field goal from 22 yards. In a shutout for the Browns, the Ravens improved their record to 4–1.

==== Week 6: at Jacksonville Jaguars ====
Week 6: Baltimore Ravens at Jacksonville Jaguars – Game summary

Quarter	1	2	3	4	Total
**Ravens**	3	3	3	6	**15**
Jaguars	3	0	0	7	**10**

at Alltel Stadium, Jacksonville, Florida

- Date: October 8
- Game time: 8:20 pm. EST
- Game weather: Clear, 71 °F (22 °C)
- Game attendance: 65,194
- TV announcers (ESPN): Mike Patrick, Joe Theismann, Paul Maguire & Suzy Kolber
- Recap

Game information

**First quarter**

- JAX – Steve Lindsey 49-yard field goal, Jaguars 3–0
- BAL – Matt Stover 47-yard field goal, Tied 3–3

**Second quarter**

- BAL – Matt Stover 32-yard field goal, Ravens 6–3

**Third quarter**

- BAL – Matt Stover 43-yard field goal, Ravens 9–3

**Fourth quarter**

- BAL – Matt Stover 21-yard field goal, Ravens 12–3
- BAL – Matt Stover 23-yard field goal, Ravens 15–3
- JAX – Fred Taylor 1-yard run (Steve Lindsey kick), Ravens 15–10

**Top passers**

- BAL – Tony Banks – 17/39, 154 yards
- JAX – Mark Brunell – 18/28, 167 yards, 2 INT

**Top rushers**

- BAL – Jamal Lewis – 17 rushes, 44 yards
- JAX – Fred Taylor – 17 rushes, 54 yards, TD

**Top receivers**

- BAL – Qadry Ismail – 9 receptions, 85 yards
- JAX – Jimmy Smith – 8 receptions, 95 yards

Baltimore would travel back to Jacksonville in a Week 2 rematch against the Jaguars at their turf in Jacksonville. The Ravens went with their second consecutive game without a touchdown with their kicker Matt Stover delivering all their points. In the first quarter, Jaguars kicker Steve Lindsey delivered a 49-yard field goal but was answered with a Stover 47-yard field goal to tie up the game. The second quarter ended with another Stover kick that would take the game to halftime with the Ravens winning 6–3. Stover would kick three more consecutive field goals to increase the score to 15–3, but the Jaguars retaliated with the final score of the game: a 1-yard rushing touchdown from Fred Taylor. However, the game was ultimately decided at 15–10 and the Ravens record elevated to 5–1.

==== Week 7: at Washington Redskins ====
Week 7: Baltimore Ravens at Washington Redskins – Game summary

Quarter	1	2	3	4	Total
Ravens	0	3	0	0	**3**
**Redskins**	0	3	0	7	**10**

at FedExField, Landover, Maryland

- Date: October 15
- Game time: 1:00 pm. EST
- Game weather: Clear, 64 °F (18 °C)
- Game attendance: 83,252
- TV announcers (CBS): Dick Enberg, Dan Dierdorf and Bonnie Bernstein
- Recap

Game information

**First quarter**

- No scoring plays.

**Second quarter**

- WAS – Kris Heppner 37-yard field goal, Redskins 3–0
- BAL – Matt Stover 51-yard field goal, Tied 3–3

**Third quarter**

- No scoring plays.

**Fourth quarter**

- WAS – Stephen Davis 33-yard run (Heppner kick), Redskins 10–3

**Top passers**

- BAL – Tony Banks – 16/35, 135 yards, INT
- WAS – Brad Johnson – 18/27, 158 yards, INT

**Top rushers**

- BAL – Jamal Lewis – 16 rushes, 34 yards
- WAS – Stephen Davis – 21 rushes, 91 yards, TD

**Top receivers**

- BAL – Shannon Sharpe – 4 receptions, 50 yards
- WAS – James Thrash – 6 receptions, 62 yards

The Ravens traveled to their Capital Beltway neighbors, the Washington Redskins, for their third straight road game. In a defensive struggle, both teams allowed under 250 yards of total offense. Halftime ended with both teams tied at 3–3 as a result of two field goals: one from the Redskins (37 yards by Kris Heppner) and the Ravens (Matt Stover from 51 yards). That field goal from Stover would be the only score that the Ravens put up in this game, where in the fourth quarter, Stephen Davis ran for a 33-yard touchdown that put Washington 10–3 over the Ravens. With this final score, the Ravens suffered their second loss and fell to 5–2.

==== Week 8: vs. Tennessee Titans ====
Week 8: Tennessee Titans at Baltimore Ravens – Game summary

Quarter	1	2	3	4	Total
**Titans**	0	7	7	0	**14**
Ravens	3	3	0	0	**6**

at PSINet Stadium, Baltimore, Maryland

- Date: October 22
- Game time: 1:00 pm. EST
- Game weather: Clear, 60 °F (16 °C)
- Game attendance: 69,200
- TV announcers (CBS): Kevin Harlan, Daryl Johnston and Beasley Reece
- Recap

Game information

**First quarter**

- BAL – Matt Stover 21-yard field goal, Ravens 3–0

**Second quarter**

- BAL – Matt Stover 38-yard field goal, Ravens 6–0
- TEN – Rodney Thomas 9-yard pass from Steve McNair (Al Del Greco kick), Titans 7–6

**Third quarter**

- TEN – Randall Godfrey 24-yard interception return (Al Del Greco kick), Titans 14–6

**Fourth quarter**

- No scoring plays.

**Top passers**

- TEN – Steve McNair – 11/21, 101 yards, TD, INT
- BAL – Tony Banks – 17/32, 229 yards, 3 INT

**Top rushers**

- TEN – Rodney Thomas – 18 rushes, 53 yards
- BAL – Jamal Lewis – 17 rushes, 58 yards

**Top receivers**

- TEN – Chris Sanders – 3 receptions, 60 yards
- BAL – Shannon Sharpe – 8 receptions, 104 yards

In Week 8, the Ravens flew back home to face off against division rivals Tennessee Titans. The Ravens continued their touchdown-less streak, where Matt Stover produced the only score for Baltimore with two field goals (from the 21- and 38-yard lines). In the second quarter, Titans quarterback Steve McNair threw a 9-yard pass to Rodney Thomas to go ahead of the home team. Just under one point, the Ravens sought to get ahead of Tennessee, however, Tony Banks produced a game high of three interceptions, with the last one sealing the game for the Titans as they won 14–6. With this loss, the Ravens fell to 5–3.

==== Week 9: vs. Pittsburgh Steelers ====
Week 9: Pittsburgh Steelers at Baltimore Ravens – Game summary

Quarter	1	2	3	4	Total
**Steelers**	0	0	6	3	**9**
Ravens	0	6	0	0	**6**

at PSINet Stadium, Baltimore, Maryland

- Date: October 29
- Game time: 1:00 pm. EST
- Game weather: Windy, 47 °F (8 °C)
- Game attendance: 69,200
- TV announcers (CBS): Ian Eagle and Mark May
- Recap

Game information

**First quarter**

- No scoring plays.

**Second quarter**

- BAL – Matt Stover 51-yard field goal, Ravens 3–0
- BAL – Matt Stover 49-yard field goal, Ravens 6–0

**Third quarter**

- PIT – Hines Ward 45-yard pass from Kordell Stewart (kick failed), Tied 6–6

**Fourth quarter**

- PIT – Kris Brown 24-yard field goal, Steelers 9–6

**Top passers**

- PIT – Kordell Stewart – 9/18, 133 yards, TD
- BAL – Trent Dilfer – 12/25, 152 yards, INT

**Top rushers**

- PIT – Jerome Bettis – 18 rushes, 65 yards
- BAL – Jamal Lewis – 19 rushes, 93 yards

**Top receivers**

- PIT – Hines Ward – 2 receptions, 55 yards
- BAL – Jamal Lewis – 3 receptions, 51 yards

In a rematch from week 1, Baltimore continued their streak without a touchdown. However, second-string quarterback Trent Dilfer started in replacement of Tony Banks, who in the past four games had not thrown one touchdown but rather more interceptions. Dilfer was unable to connect with any receiver into the endzone on top of throwing a lone interception. The Ravens had the advantage heading into halftime with two field goals from Matt Stover that were over 40 yards. In the third quarter, the Steelers retaliated with nine points of their own as a result of a touchdown and a missed extra point from Kris Brown, followed by Brown kicking a go-ahead field goal. The Ravens failed to respond in the fourth quarter and were dealt their third straight loss.

==== Week 10: at Cincinnati Bengals ====
Week 10: Baltimore Ravens at Cincinnati Bengals – Game summary

Quarter	1	2	3	4	Total
**Ravens**	3	21	0	3	**27**
Bengals	0	0	7	0	**7**

at Paul Brown Stadium, Cincinnati, Ohio

- Date: November 5
- Game time: 1:00 pm. EST
- Game weather: 57 °F (14 °C)
- Game attendance: 54,759
- TV announcers (CBS): Tim Brando and Spencer Tillman
- Recap

Game information

**First quarter**

- BAL – Matt Stover 38-yard field goal, Ravens 3–0

**Second quarter**

- BAL – Brandon Stokely 14-yard pass from Trent Dilfer (Matt Stover kick), Ravens 10–0
- BAL – Shannon Sharpe 18-yard pass from Trent Dilfer (Matt Stover kick), Ravens 17–0
- BAL – Shannon Sharpe 19-yard pass from Trent Dilfer (Matt Stover kick), Ravens 24–0

**Third quarter**

- CIN – Peter Warrick 4-yard run (Neil Rackers kick), Ravens 24–7

**Fourth quarter**

- BAL – Matt Stover 32-yard field goal, Ravens 27–7

**Top passers**

- BAL – Trent Dilfer – 23/34, 244 yards, 3 TD
- CIN – Akili Smith – 15/ 27, 137 yards

**Top rushers**

- BAL – Jamal Lewis – 22 rushes, 109 yards
- CIN – Corey Dillon – 16 rushes, 23 yards

**Top receivers**

- BAL – Jamal Lewis – 3 receptions, 70 yards
- CIN – Tony McGee – 2 receptions, 41 yards

In a rematch of Week 4, the Ravens traveled to Ohio against AFC Central adversaries, Bengals. Matt Stover put the Ravens on the board with three points after a 38-yard field goal in the first quarter. Baltimore entered their season best second quarter in this game with three touchdown passes from new starting quarterback Trent Dilfer that had the Ravens up by 24 unanswered points. Cincinnati answered with a touchdown, and their only score, during the third quarter with Peter Warrick's 4-yard rush. The game came to a close following a field goal from Stover that had the Ravens defeat the Bengals 27–7. The Ravens improved their record to 6–4 and began a seven-game winning streak.

==== Week 11: at Tennessee Titans ====
Week 11: Baltimore Ravens at Tennessee Titans – Game summary

Quarter	1	2	3	4	Total
**Ravens**	7	10	0	7	**24**
Titans	0	14	0	9	**23**

at Adelphia Coliseum, Nashville, Tennessee

- Date: November 12
- Game time: 12:00 pm. EST
- Game weather: 46 °F (8 °C)
- Game attendance: 68,490
- Referee: Mike Carey
- TV announcers (CBS): Dick Enberg, Dan Dierdorf and Bonnie Bernstein
- Recap

Game information

**First quarter**

- BAL – Qadry Ismail 46-yard pass from Trent Dilfer (Matt Stover kick), Ravens 7–0

**Second quarter**

- BAL – Jamal Lewis 2-yard run (Matt Stover kick), Ravens 14–0
- TEN – Derrick Mason 14-yard pass from Steve McNair (Al Del Greco kick), Ravens 14–7
- BAL – Matt Stover 45-yard field goal, Ravens 17–7
- TEN – Lorenzo Neal 4-yard pass from Steve McNair (Al Del Greco kick), Ravens 17–14

**Third quarter**

- No scoring plays.

**Fourth quarter**

- TEN – Al Del Greco 23-yard field goal, Tied 17–17
- TEN – Perry Phenix 87-yard interception return (kick failed), Titans 23–17
- BAL – Patrick Johnson 2-yard pass from Trent Dilfer (Matt Stover kick), Ravens 24–23

**Top passers**

- BAL – Trent Dilfer – 23/36, 281 yards, 2 TD, INT
- TEN – Steve McNair – 21/34, 228 yards, 2 TD

**Top rushers**

- BAL – Jamal Lewis – 23 rushes, 99 yards, TD
- TEN – Eddie George – 5 rushes, 63 yards

**Top receivers**

- BAL – Shannon Sharpe – 8 receptions, 92 yards
- TEN – Derrick Mason – 5 receptions, 63 yards, TD

Just after battling against Tennessee three weeks earlier, Baltimore traveled to Nashville to face off against the Titans. The Ravens scored first on a 46-yard reception by Qadry Ismail from Trent Dilfer in the first quarter. Jamal Lewis would then double the points with a 2-yard rush that put up the Ravens 14–0 during the second quarter. The Titans answered with two touchdown passes from Steve McNair to Derrick Mason and Lorenzo Neal, respectively. After a field goal from Matt Stover, halftime stood at 17–14, favoring the Ravens. In a defensive struggle in the third quarter, no team was able to score. However, the game became tied at 17–17 with a 23-yard field goal from Al Del Greco upon the final quarter. Tennessee sought to end the game after Perry Phenix intercepted a pass from Dilfer and returned it 87 yards for a touchdown; however, Del Greco failed to convert the extra point. This allowed the Ravens to end the game with a touchdown pass to Patrick Johnson from Dilfer and a successful extra point conversion. The Titans did drive into field goal range in the final seconds, but Del Greco missed a 43 yard field goal as time expired. With this win, the Ravens raised their record to 7–4 and became the first team to defeat the Titans in Adelphia Coliseum.

==== Week 12: vs. Dallas Cowboys ====
Week 12: Dallas Cowboys at Baltimore Ravens – Game summary

Quarter	1	2	3	4	Total
Cowboys	0	0	0	0	**0**
**Ravens**	10	7	0	10	**27**

at PSINet Stadium, Baltimore, Maryland

- Date: November 19
- Game time: 4:15 pm. EST
- Game weather: 43 °F (6 °C)
- Game attendance: 69,416
- Referee: Jeff Triplette
- TV announcers (Fox): Pat Summerall, John Madden, and D. J. Johnson
- Recap

Game information

**First quarter**

- BAL – Qadry Ismail 40-yard pass from Trent Dilfer (Matt Stover kick), Ravens 7–0
- BAL – Matt Stover 25-yard field goal, Ravens 10–0

**Second quarter**

- BAL – Shannon Sharpe 59-yard pass from Trent Dilfer (Matt Stover kick), Ravens 17–0

**Third quarter**

- No scoring plays.

**Fourth quarter**

- BAL – Matt Stover 19-yard field goal, Ravens 20–0
- BAL – Priest Holmes 5-yard run (Matt Stover kick), Ravens 27–0

**Top passers**

- DAL – Troy Aikman – 19/33, 138 yards, 3 INT
- BAL – Trent Dilfer – 18/24, 242 yards, 2 TD, 2 INT

**Top rushers**

- DAL – Emmitt Smith – 11 rushes, 48 yards
- BAL – Jamal Lewis – 28 rushes, 187 yards

**Top receivers**

- DAL – James McKnight – 4 receptions, 50 yards
- BAL – Shannon Sharpe – 5 receptions, 101 yards, 1 TD

The Ravens defense put up another dominant performance in a 27–0 shutout of the Dallas Cowboys. Troy Aikman threw three interceptions and the Cowboys were held to 192 total yards and went 1/10 on third down. On the other hand, the Ravens offense racked up 479 total yards, which would be the most yards they would have that season. Jamal Lewis rushed for 187 yards and Priest Holmes put the game well out of reach with a late fourth quarter touchdown. With their third-straight win, the Ravens improved to 8–4, matching their win total from the previous season.

== Standings ==
AFC Central
	W	L	T	PCT	PF	PA	STK
^{(1)} Tennessee Titans	13	3	0	.813	346	191	W4
^{(4)} Baltimore Ravens	12	4	0	.750	333	165	W7
Pittsburgh Steelers	9	7	0	.563	321	255	W2
Jacksonville Jaguars	7	9	0	.438	367	327	L2
Cincinnati Bengals	4	12	0	.250	185	359	L1
Cleveland Browns	3	13	0	.188	161	419	L5

== Postseason ==
=== Schedule ===
Round	Date	Opponent (seed)	Result	Record	Venue	Recap
Wild Card	December 31, 2000	Denver Broncos (5)	W 21–3	1–0	PSINet Stadium	Recap
Divisional	January 7, 2001	at Tennessee Titans (1)	W 24–10	2–0	Adelphia Coliseum	Recap
AFC Championship	January 14, 2001	at Oakland Raiders (2)	W 16–3	3–0	Network Associates Coliseum	Recap
Super Bowl XXXV	January 28, 2001	vs. New York Giants (N1)	W 34–7	4–0	Raymond James Stadium	Recap

=== Game summaries ===
==== AFC Wild Card Playoffs vs. (5) Denver Broncos ====
AFC Wild Card Playoffs: (5) Denver Broncos at (4) Baltimore Ravens – Game summary

Quarter	1	2	3	4	Total
Broncos	0	3	0	0	3
Ravens	0	14	7	0	21

at PSINet Stadium, Baltimore, Maryland

- Date: December 31
- Game time: 12:30 pm. EST
- Game weather: Clear, 28 °F (−2 °C)
- Referee: Larry Nemmers
- TV announcers (CBS): Greg Gumbel, Phil Simms and Armen Keteyian

Game information

First quarter

- No scoring plays.

Second quarter

- BAL – Jamal Lewis 1-yard run (Matt Stover Kick), 11:43. Ravens 7–0. Drive: 10 plays, 75 yards, 5:51.
- DEN – Jason Elam 31-yard field goal, 4:31. Ravens 7–3. Drive: 12 plays, 68 yards, 7:12.
- BAL – Shannon Sharpe 58-yard pass from Trent Dilfer (Matt Stover kick), 4:06. Ravens 14–3. Drive: 1 play, 58 yards, 0:25.

Third quarter

- BAL – Jamal Lewis 27-yard run (Matt Stover kick), 3:19. Ravens 21–3. Drive: 2 plays, 28 yards, 0:42.

Fourth quarter

- No scoring plays.

Top passers

- DEN – Gus Frerotte – 13/28, 124 yards, INT
- BAL – Trent Dilfer – 9/14, 130 yards, TD

Top rushers

- DEN – Mike Anderson – 15 rushes, 40 yards
- BAL – Jamal Lewis – 30 rushes, 110 yards, 2 TD

Top receivers

- DEN – Ed McCaffrey – 8 receptions, 75 yards
- BAL – Qadry Ismail – 4 receptions, 35 yards

==== AFC Divisional Playoffs: at (1) Tennessee Titans ====
AFC Divisional Playoffs: (4) Baltimore Ravens at (1) Tennessee Titans – Game summary

Quarter	1	2	3	4	Total
Ravens	0	7	3	14	24
Titans	7	0	3	0	10

at Adelphia Coliseum, Nashville, Tennessee

- Date: January 7
- Game time: 12:30 pm. EST
- Game weather: Clear, 43 °F (6 °C)
- TV announcers (CBS): Dick Enberg, Dan Dierdorf and Bonnie Bernstein

Game information

First quarter

- TEN – Eddie George 2-yard run (Al Del Greco Kick), 7:43. Titans 7–0. Drive: 11 plays, 68 yards, 7:17.

Second quarter

- BAL – Jamal Lewis 1-yard run (Matt Stover Kick), 9:46. Tied 7–7. Drive: 4 plays, 57 yards, 1:36.

Third quarter

- TEN – Al Del Greco 21-yard field goal, 8:14. Titans 10–7. Drive: 8 plays, 24 yards, 4:23.
- BAL – Matt Stover 38-yard field goal, 3:05. Tied 10–10. Drive: 6 plays, 25 yards, 2:34.

Fourth quarter

- BAL – Anthony Mitchell 90-yard blocked field goal return (Matt Stover kick), 12:12. Ravens 17–10.
- BAL – Ray Lewis 50-yard interception return (Matt Stover kick), 6:41. Ravens 24–10.

Top passers

- BAL – Trent Dilfer – 5/16, 117 yards
- TEN – Steve McNair – 24/46, 176 yards, INT

Top rushers

- BAL – Jamal Lewis – 17 rushes, 47 yards, TD
- TEN – Eddie George – 27 rushes, 91 yards, TD

Top receivers

- BAL – Qadry Ismail – 3 receptions, 53 yards
- TEN – Eddie George – 8 receptions, 52 yards

==== AFC Championship: at (2) Oakland Raiders ====
AFC Championship: (4) Baltimore Ravens at (2) Oakland Raiders – Game summary

Quarter	1	2	3	4	Total
Ravens	0	10	3	3	16
Raiders	0	0	3	0	3

at Network Associates Coliseum, Oakland, California

- Date: January 14
- Game time: 4:05 pm. EST
- Game weather: Clear, 50 °F (10 °C)
- TV announcers (CBS): Greg Gumbel, Phil Simms, Armen Keteyian and Bonnie Bernstein

Game information

First quarter

- No scoring plays.

Second quarter

- BAL – Shannon Sharpe 96-yard pass from Trent Dilfer (Matt Stover Kick), 11:08. Ravens 7–0. Drive: 3 plays, 88 yards, 1:27.
- BAL – Matt Stover 31-yard field goal, 8:19. Ravens 10–0. Drive: 4 plays, 7 yards, 1:53.

Third quarter

- OAK – Sebastian Janikowski 24-yard field, 10:07. Ravens 10–3. Drive: 9 plays, 33 yards, 3:34.
- BAL – Matt Stover 28-yard field goal, 5:08. Ravens 13–3. Drive: 9 plays, 51 yards, 4:59.

Fourth quarter

- BAL – Matt Stover 21-yard field goal, 7:28. Ravens 16–3. Drive: 7 plays, 3 yards, 4:04.

Top passers

- BAL – Trent Dilfer – 9/18, 190 yards, TD, INT
- OAK – Bobby Hoying – 8/16, 107 yards, 2 INT

Top rushers

- BAL – Jamal Lewis – 29 rushes, 79 yards
- OAK – Bobby Hoying – 3 rushes, 13 yards

Top receivers

- BAL – Shannon Sharpe – 1 reception, 96 yards, TD
- OAK – Tim Brown – 5 receptions, 48 yards

==== Super Bowl XXXV: vs. (N1) New York Giants ====
Super Bowl XXXV: (A4) Baltimore Ravens vs. (N1) New York Giants – Game summary

Quarter	1	2	3	4	Total
Ravens	7	3	14	10	34
Giants	0	0	7	0	7

at Raymond James Stadium, Tampa Bay, Florida

- Date: January 28, 2001
- Game time: 6:30 pm. EST
- Game weather: Clear, 57 °F (14 °C)
- TV announcers (CBS): Greg Gumbel, Phil Simms, Bonnie Bernstein, and Armen Keteyian

Game information

First quarter

- BAL – Brandon Stokley 38-yard pass from Trent Dilfer (Matt Stover kick), 6:50. Ravens 7–0. Drive: 2 plays, 41 yards, 0:45.

Second quarter

- BAL – Matt Stover 47-yard field goal, 1:41. Ravens 10–0. Drive: 7 plays, 59 yards, 2:28.

Third quarter

- BAL – Duane Starks 49-yard interception return (Matt Stover kick), 3:49. Ravens 17–0.
- NYG – Ron Dixon 97-yard kickoff return (Brad Daluiso kick), 3:31. Ravens 17–7.
- BAL – Jermaine Lewis 84-yard kickoff return (Matt Stover kick), 3:13. Ravens 24–7.

Fourth quarter

- BAL – Jamal Lewis 3-yard run (Matt Stover kick), 8:45. Ravens 31–7. Drive: 6 plays, 38 yards, 4:17.
- BAL – Matt Stover 34-yard field goal, 5:27. Ravens 34–7. Drive: 5 plays, 18 yards, 3:02.

Top passers

- BAL – Trent Dilfer – 12/25, 153 yards, TD
- NYG – Kerry Collins – 15/39, 112 yards, 4 INT

Top rushers

- BAL – Jamal Lewis – 27 rushes, 102 yards, TD
- NYG – Tiki Barber – 11 rushes, 39 yards

Top receivers

- BAL – Brandon Stokley – 3 receptions, 52 yards, TD
- NYG – Tiki Barber – 6 receptions, 26 yards

The Ravens and Giants set a Super Bowl record by scoring three touchdowns in three consecutive plays, tallying just 36 seconds in the third quarter. The Ravens defense completely shut down the Giants offense, not yielding a single point. The only points the Giants would score on would be a kickoff return for a touchdown. The Ravens held the Giants to 152 total yards of offense and forced five turnovers along with four sacks. The Ravens defense surrendered just one offensive touchdown in four playoff games and only allowed 16 points (4.0 points per game).

== Defensive legacy ==
The Ravens defense in 2000 is often named among the greatest NFL defenses of all time. Baltimore gave up only 970 rushing yards (60.6 per game) all year, an NFL record for a 16-game season, and 186 fewer yards than the next lowest team, Baltimore's Super Bowl XXXV opponent, the New York Giants. Baltimore gave up only five rushing touchdowns all season, and allowed a paltry 2.7 yards per rush, both league bests. Baltimore only allowed 165 points all season, also an NFL record for a 16-game season. Including the postseason, Baltimore's defense allowed only 188 points in 20 games to opposing offenses that year (9.4 points per game). The Ravens allowed three other touchdowns that came from their opponents' defense and special teams (two interception returns and one kickoff return). Furthermore, the Ravens recovered an astronomical 26 opponent's fumbles during the season, double the total of the second-ranked team. Their defense also intercepted 23 passes to give them a total of 49 turnovers forced that season, most in the NFL. They did all of this despite their own offense's passing struggles and going five consecutive games without scoring a touchdown.

Statistical site Football Outsiders noted, "One more interesting note on the Baltimore defense: it was the only dominant defense of the past few years to be based on stopping the run instead of controlling the pass. For all the clichés about the need to stop the run, in general the best defenses are ranked the highest because they have the best ratings against the pass, not against the run – just like the best offenses are ranked the highest because they are the best through the air, not on the ground. The 2000 Ravens only rank seventh in defense against the pass, but their rushing defense ... is far and away the best of the past six seasons."

== Awards ==
Middle linebacker Ray Lewis was named NFL Defensive Player of the Year by the Associated Press. Five players represented the Ravens in the Pro Bowl: Lewis joined defensive tackle Sam Adams, safety Rod Woodson, offensive tackle Jonathan Ogden, and kicker Matt Stover. Matt Stover joined Lewis and Ogden on the associated press' All-Pro first team. Defensive end Rob Burnett joined Adams and Woodson on the AP All-Pro second team.

- Sam Adams, AFC Pro Bowl Selection,
- Brian Billick, USA Today AFC Coach of the Year,
- Trent Dilfer, Football Digest Comeback Player of the Year,
- Jamal Lewis, USA Today Offensive Rookie of the Year,
- Marvin Lewis, Football Digest Assistant Coach of the Year,
- Marvin Lewis, Pro Football Writers Association Assistant Coach of the Year,
- Marvin Lewis, USA Today AFC Assistant Coach of the Year,
- Ray Lewis, Associated Press Defensive Player of the Year,
- Ray Lewis, Football Digest Defensive Player of the Year,
- Ray Lewis, Pro Football Writers Association Defensive Most Valuable Player,
- Jonathan Ogden, AFC Pro Bowl Selection,
- Matt Stover, Golden Toe Award
- Rod Woodson, AFC Pro Bowl Selection,
