= Anthony Mitchell (American football) =

American football player (born 1974)

No. 42
- Position: Safety

Personal information
- Born: December 13, 1974 (age 51); Youngstown, Ohio, U.S.
- Listed height: 5 ft 8 in (1.73 m)
- Listed weight: 220 lb (100 kg)

Career information
- High school: Westlake (Atlanta, Georgia)
- College: Tuskegee
- NFL draft: 1999: undrafted

Career history
- Jacksonville Jaguars (1999)*; Baltimore Ravens (1999–2002); Jacksonville Jaguars (2003); Cincinnati Bengals (2004–2006)
- * Offseason or practice squad member only

Awards and highlights
- Super Bowl champion (XXXV)

Career NFL statistics
- Tackles: 160
- Interceptions: 3
- Sacks: 1
- Stats at Pro Football Reference

Anthony Maurice Mitchell (born December 13, 1974) is an American former professional football player who was a safety in the National Football League (NFL). He played college football for the Tuskegee Golden Tigers and was signed by the Baltimore Ravens as an undrafted free agent in 1999.

== Professional career ==
Mitchell was originally signed as an undrafted rookie by the Jacksonville Jaguars in 1999, but after the preseason, he was waived in the final cuts. He spent most of the 1999 season on the Baltimore Ravens' practice squad and was elevated to the 53-man roster for the final four games.

Mitchell is best remembered for his play as a reserve safety on the 2000 Ravens squad that made an improbable run to Super Bowl XXXV. In a pivotal January 2001 playoff game played in Nashville, Baltimore was tied 10–10 with the Tennessee Titans early in the fourth quarter. With just over 12 minutes remaining in the game, Titans kicker Al Del Greco lined up for a potential game-winning 37-yard field goal from the right hash. At the snap, Baltimore defensive lineman Keith Washington bullrushed the Titans lineman defending him, losing his helmet in the process; undeterred, Washington stretched out his right arm over his head, deflecting Del Greco's kick high into the air. Mitchell snatched the tipped ball out of the air at the Ravens' 10-yard line, raced up the far sideline and, with the help of blocks thrown by backup safety Corey Harris and starting cornerback Chris McAlister, returned the ball 90 yards for a Baltimore touchdown. Mitchell's return catapulted the Ravens to a 24–10 win and set them on the path to their first world championship.

In 2003, the Jaguars acquired Mitchell from the Ravens in a trade for a conditional draft choice. After playing one season with the Jaguars, Mitchell spent his final three seasons with the Cincinnati Bengals.

== NFL career statistics ==
Legend
| | Won the Super Bowl |
| **Bold** | Career high |

=== Regular season ===
| Year | Team | Games | | Tackles | | | | Interceptions | | | | | Fumbles | | |
| Year | Team | GP | GS | Cmb | Solo | Ast | Sck | Int | Yds | Avg | TD | PD | FF | FR | TD |
|---|---|---|---|---|---|---|---|---|---|---|---|---|---|---|---|
| 1999 | BAL | 0 | 0 | Did not play | | | | | | | | | | | |
| 2000 | BAL | 16 | 0 | 15 | 13 | 2 | 0.0 | 0 | 0 | 0 | 0 | 0 | 0 | **1** | 0 |
| 2001 | BAL | 16 | 0 | 23 | 18 | 5 | 0.0 | 0 | 0 | 0 | 0 | 0 | 0 | 0 | 0 |
| 2002 | BAL | 16 | 6 | **53** | **34** | **19** | 0.0 | **3** | **62** | **20.7** | 0 | **3** | 0 | 0 | 0 |
| 2003 | JAX | 16 | 2 | 20 | 18 | 2 | 0.0 | 0 | 0 | 0 | 0 | 0 | 0 | 0 | 0 |
| 2004 | CIN | 12 | 0 | 19 | 13 | 6 | 0.0 | 0 | 0 | 0 | 0 | 0 | 0 | **1** | 0 |
| 2005 | CIN | 16 | 0 | 30 | 22 | 8 | **1.0** | 0 | 0 | 0 | 0 | 0 | 0 | 0 | 0 |
| 2006 | CIN | 0 | 0 | Did not play due to injury | | | | | | | | | | | |
| Career | | 92 | 8 | 160 | 118 | 42 | 1.0 | 3 | 62 | 20.7 | 0 | 3 | 0 | 2 | 0 |

=== Postseason ===
| Year | Team | Games | | Tackles | | | | Interceptions | | | | | Fumbles | | |
| Year | Team | GP | GS | Cmb | Solo | Ast | Sck | Int | Yds | Avg | TD | PD | FF | FR | TD |
|---|---|---|---|---|---|---|---|---|---|---|---|---|---|---|---|
| 2000 | BAL | 4 | 0 | 2 | 2 | 0 | 0.0 | 0 | 0 | 0 | 0 | 0 | 0 | 0 | 0 |
| 2001 | BAL | 2 | 0 | **5** | **3** | **2** | **1.0** | 0 | 0 | 0 | 0 | 0 | 0 | 0 | 0 |
| 2005 | CIN | 1 | 0 | 1 | 1 | 0 | 0.0 | 0 | 0 | 0 | 0 | 0 | 0 | 0 | 0 |
| Career | | 7 | 0 | 8 | 6 | 2 | 1.0 | 0 | 0 | 0 | 0 | 0 | 0 | 0 | 0 |

In a 2000 postseason game against the Tennessee Titans, Mitchell returned a blocked field goal 90 yards for a touchdown.

== Personal life ==
Mitchell's son, Keaton Mitchell, played running back at East Carolina University before he too was signed by the Ravens as an undrafted free agent before the 2023 season.
