= Sam Adams (American football) =

American football player (born 1973)

No. 98, 95
- Positions: Defensive tackle, defensive end

Personal information
- Born: June 13, 1973 (age 53); Houston, Texas, U.S.
- Listed height: 6 ft 4 in (1.93 m)
- Listed weight: 350 lb (159 kg)

Career information
- High school: Cypress Creek (Houston)
- College: Texas A&M
- NFL draft: 1994: 1st round, 8th overall pick

Career history
- Seattle Seahawks (1994–1999); Baltimore Ravens (2000–2001); Oakland Raiders (2002); Buffalo Bills (2003–2005); Cincinnati Bengals (2006); Denver Broncos (2007)

Awards and highlights
- Super Bowl champion (XXXV); First-team All-Pro (2001); Second-team All-Pro (2000); 3× Pro Bowl (2000, 2001, 2004); PFWA All-Rookie Team (1994); Consensus All-American (1993); 2× First-team All-SWC (1992, 1993); Second-team All-SWC (1991)

Career NFL statistics
- Tackles: 403
- Sacks: 44
- Forced fumbles: 5
- Fumble recoveries: 5
- Interceptions: 3
- Defensive touchdowns: 2
- Stats at Pro Football Reference

Samuel Aaron Adams (born June 13, 1973) is an American former professional football player who was a defensive tackle for 14 seasons in the National Football League (NFL). He played college football for the Texas A&M Aggies, earning consensus All-American honors, and was selected eighth overall by the Seattle Seahawks in the 1994 NFL draft. Following six seasons as a member of the Seahawks, he earned consecutive Pro Bowl selections and All-Pro honors during his two seasons with the Baltimore Ravens. Adams was also part of the team that won a Super Bowl title in Super Bowl XXXV and made another championship appearance in his one season for the Oakland Raiders in 2002. As a member of the Buffalo Bills from 2003 to 2004, Adams was named to a third Pro Bowl. He spent his last two seasons with the Cincinnati Bengals and the Denver Broncos.

== Early life ==
Adams was born in Houston, Texas to former NFL offensive guard Sam Adams Sr. He attended Cypress Creek High School in Houston, and he was part of the Cypress Creek Cougars defense that included fellow future NFL player Dan Neil. At Cy-Creek, Adams was not only the Prep Southwest Defensive Player of the Year in football, but a state champion in the shot put, placing second in the nation among high school track and field athletes.

== College career ==
Adams attended Texas A&M University, where he was a starter for the Texas A&M Aggies football team for three years. He was the Southwest Conference (SWC) Newcomer of the Year as a freshman in 1991 and a first-team freshman All-American. He was a first-team All-SWC selection in 1992 after making 56 tackles, including 4.5 quarterback sacks.

In his junior year, 1993, he led the team in tackles for loss (13), sacks (10.5), forced fumbles (5), and fumble recoveries (3), while making 78 tackles. He was recognized as a consensus first-team All-American, and was named national defensive player of the year by Sports Illustrated. He was also the Southwest Conference defensive player of the year, as well as the runner-up for the Lombardi Award. He finished his Texas A&M football career with 169 total tackles, 23 tackles for a loss, 20.5 sacks, seven forced fumbles, three fumble recoveries, and two interceptions.

He was also a member of the Texas A&M track team, throwing the shot and discus and for his accomplishments on the track and on the gridiron, Adams was inducted into the Texas A&M Hall of Fame in 2001.

== Professional career ==
Pre-draft measurables
Height	Weight	Arm length	Hand span	20-yard shuttle	Vertical jump
6 ft 2 1/4 in (1.89 m)	292 lb (132 kg)	33 1/4 in (0.84 m)	8 1/2 in (0.22 m)	4.57 s	29.5 in (0.75 m)
All values from NFL Combine

=== Seattle Seahawks ===
Adams was selected in the first round (eighth overall) by the Seattle Seahawks in the 1994 NFL draft. He played for the Seahawks from 1994 to 1999. He made several starts during his rookie year, splitting time between defensive tackle and defensive end. In his second season, he sacked Mark Brunell of the Jacksonville Jaguars for a safety, scoring his first points of his professional career. He also blocked a field goal in overtime against the Arizona Cardinals. He played several more years for Seattle, making the AFC Pro Bowl team as an alternate in 1997.

=== Baltimore Ravens ===
In 2000, he signed as a free agent with the Baltimore Ravens, and was a crucial piece in helping lead the most dominant defense in the league to a victory in Super Bowl XXXV. That season, he was also named as a starter in the Pro Bowl for the first time, a feat he would repeat the following season.

=== Oakland Raiders ===
In 2002, he was a free agent once again, and signed with the Oakland Raiders. He started 14 of 16 games that season, playing in 15 of those 16 games; one was missed due to injury. He was on the team that went to Super Bowl XXXVII.

=== Buffalo Bills ===
In 2003, Adams signed with the Buffalo Bills as a free agent and helped anchor the defensive line there. His first game for Buffalo was a memorable one, as he registered a sack, two tackles, and an interception against Tom Brady which was returned for his second career touchdown. He was a Pro Bowl alternate in 2003 for the second time in his career.

On March 1, 2006, Adams was released by the Bills due to salary cap issues.

=== Cincinnati Bengals ===
On March 30, Adams signed a three-year contract with the Cincinnati Bengals. As a Bengal, he was reunited with head coach Marvin Lewis, who was the defensive coordinator for the Ravens when Adams played for them.

=== Denver Broncos ===
Adams signed with the Denver Broncos on June 4, 2007. He was released on December 4.

== NFL career statistics ==
Year	Team	GP	COMB	TOTAL	AST	SACK	FF	FR	YDS	INT	YDS	AVG	LNG	TD	PD
1994	SEA	12	27	20	7	4.0	0	0	0	0	0	0	0	0	4
1995	SEA	16	26	16	10	3.5	0	0	0	0	0	0	0	0	4
1996	SEA	16	40	34	6	5.5	3	1	0	0	0	0	0	0	4
1997	SEA	16	51	36	15	7.0	1	0	0	0	0	0	0	0	4
1998	SEA	16	29	26	3	2.0	0	1	0	1	25	25	25	1	4
1999	SEA	13	38	31	7	1.0	0	1	0	0	0	0	0	0	1
2000	BAL	16	27	23	4	2.0	0	1	0	0	0	0	0	0	6
2001	BAL	14	23	19	4	2.0	1	0	0	0	0	0	0	0	1
2002	OAK	15	21	17	4	2.0	0	0	0	0	0	0	0	0	1
2003	BUF	15	33	24	9	5.0	0	1	0	1	37	37	37	1	3
2004	BUF	16	41	26	15	5.0	1	0	0	1	0	0	0	0	3
2005	BUF	14	19	15	4	3.0	0	0	0	0	0	0	0	0	0
2006	CIN	16	14	10	4	2.0	0	0	0	0	0	0	0	0	0
2007	DEN	11	9	5	4	0.0	0	0	0	0	0	0	0	0	1
Career		206	398	302	96	44.0	6	5	0	3	62	21	37	2	36
