= Jamal Lewis (American football) =

American football player (born 1979)

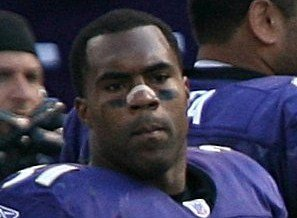
- Lewis with the Baltimore Ravens in 2006

No. 31
- Position: Running back

Personal information
- Born: August 26, 1979 (age 47); Atlanta, Georgia, U.S.
- Listed height: 5 ft 11 in (1.80 m)
- Listed weight: 245 lb (111 kg)

Career information
- High school: Douglass (Atlanta)
- College: Tennessee (1997–1999)
- NFL draft: 2000: 1st round, 5th overall pick

Career history
- Baltimore Ravens (2000–2006); Cleveland Browns (2007–2009)

Awards and highlights
- Super Bowl champion (XXXV); PFWA NFL Most Valuable Player (2003); NFL Offensive Player of the Year (2003); First-team All-Pro (2003); Pro Bowl (2003); NFL rushing yards leader (2003); NFL 2000s All-Decade Team; PFWA All-Rookie Team (2000); Baltimore Ravens Ring of Honor; BCS national champion (1998); 2× Second-team All-SEC (1997, 1999); SEC Freshman of the Year (1997)

Career NFL statistics
- Rushing yards: 10,607
- Rushing average: 4.2
- Rushing touchdowns: 58
- Receptions: 221
- Receiving yards: 1,879
- Receiving touchdown: 4
- Stats at Pro Football Reference

Jamal Lewis (born August 26, 1979) is an American former professional football player who was a running back in the National Football League (NFL) for the Baltimore Ravens and Cleveland Browns. He played college football for the Tennessee Volunteers and was selected fifth overall by the Ravens in the 2000 NFL draft. After spending his first seven seasons with the Ravens, Lewis signed a free agent contract with the Cleveland Browns before the 2007 season and retired after the 2009 season.

Lewis is best known for his career as a Raven, where he contributed to the team winning Super Bowl XXXV as a rookie. He is the youngest player to both play in and win a Super Bowl. Lewis is also known for his outstanding 2003 season, where he rushed for 2,066 yards (third-most all-time, behind Eric Dickerson and Adrian Peterson) and was named AP NFL Offensive Player of the Year. That same year, Lewis also rushed for 295 yards in one game, which was the single-game record until Adrian Peterson rushed for 296 yards in 2007 against the San Diego Chargers. Lewis was inducted into the Ravens Ring of Honor in 2012.

== Early life ==
Lewis attended Douglass High School in Atlanta, Georgia, where he was a letterman in football and track. Lewis was rated as the top running back prospect in the nation by Super Prep. Prep Star rated him as the No. 2 southern RB. Lewis rushed for 25 touchdowns as a senior and earned AAAA All-State and All-City honors. He was named MVP of the Georgia-Florida All-Star Game, with 137 yards on 11 carries, for a 12.4 average, and two touchdowns. Lewis gained 1,923 yards and scored 28 touchdowns as a junior and 1,240 yards and 15 touchdowns as a sophomore. In his three years as a starter, he rushed for a school-record 4,879 yards and 68 touchdowns, plus had a 9.7-yard average per carry. While at Douglass, Lewis converted from a fullback to the starting running back.

In track & field, Lewis was a standout sprinter. He got personal-best times of 10.84 seconds in the 100 meters and 22.04 seconds in the 200 meters. He was also a member of the 4 × 100 m (42.14s) relay squad.

== College career ==
As a freshman at Tennessee in 1997, Lewis rushed for 1,364 yards and seven touchdowns. For his efforts, he was named first-team Freshman All-America by The Sporting News and second-team All-SEC by the Associated Press. In the 1997 season, quarterback Peyton Manning caught a 10-yard pass from Lewis against Arkansas. In 1998, Lewis suffered a torn lateral collateral ligament in his right knee and missed the rest of the season. He returned in 1999 and had 816 rushing yards and seven rushing touchdowns. In his three-year career at the University of Tennessee, Lewis rushed for 2,677 yards and accounted for 3,161 all-purpose. Lewis ranks fifth on the university's list of all-time rushers.

== Professional career ==
Pre-draft measurables
Height	Weight	Arm length	Hand span	Bench press
5 ft 11 3/4 in (1.82 m)	240 lb (109 kg)	32 in (0.81 m)	10 1/4 in (0.26 m)	23 reps
All values from NFL Combine

=== Baltimore Ravens ===
==== 2000 season ====
Regarded as the best available tailback alongside Thomas Jones, Lewis was selected in the first round with the fifth overall pick in the 2000 NFL draft by the Baltimore Ravens.

Lewis made his NFL debut in Week 1 against the Pittsburgh Steelers. He had five carries for 16 yards in the 16–0 victory. He made his first start in Week 3 against the Miami Dolphins. He had 25 carries for 116 rushing yards and one rushing touchdown in Week 4 against the Cincinnati Bengals in a 37–0 victory. On November 19, in Week 12, against the Dallas Cowboys, Lewis became the youngest player since 1960 to record 200 yards from scrimmage (21 years, 82 days); since broken by Kenny Britt in 2009, and JuJu Smith-Schuster in 2017. In the following game, against the Cleveland Browns, he had 30 carries for 170 rushing yards in the 44–7 victory. In his rookie season, he rushed for 1,364 yards and six touchdowns, supplanting Priest Holmes as the team's starting running back. He was named the PFWA All-Rookie Team.

In the Wild Card Round against the Denver Broncos, Lewis had 30 carries for 110 rushing yards and two rushing touchdowns in the 21–3 victory. In the Divisional Round against the Tennessee Titans, he had a rushing touchdown in the 24–10 victory. In the AFC Championship against the Oakland Raiders, he had 100 scrimmage yards in the 16–3 victory. The Ravens' running game and punishing defense earned them their first Super Bowl when they defeated the New York Giants 34–7 in Super Bowl XXXV. Lewis rushed for 103 yards and scored a touchdown in the game, becoming only the second rookie ever to rush for over 100 yards in a Super Bowl and the youngest player to score a touchdown in a Super Bowl (21). Lewis also became the youngest player to ever win a Super Bowl; he was 21 years and 155 days old on the day of the game. He broke Tony Hill's 23-year-old record; Hill had been 21 years and 206 days old on January 15, 1978, when the Cowboys beat the Broncos 27–10 in Super Bowl XII.

==== 2001 season ====
Lewis missed the 2001 NFL season due to an ACL tear and MCL sprain that he sustained in training camp.

==== 2002 season ====
In Week 5 of the 2002 season, against the Cleveland Browns, he had 26 carries for 187 rushing yards and five receptions for 26 receiving yards in the 26–21 victory. In the following game against the Indianapolis Colts, he had 126 scrimmage yards and two rushing touchdowns in the 22–20 loss. In Week 10, against the Cincinnati Bengals, he had 21 carries for 135 rushing yards and two rushing touchdowns in the 38–27 victory. In the 2002 season, Lewis appeared in 16 games and started 15. He finished with 308 carries for 1,327 rushing yards and six rushing touchdowns to go along with 47 receptions for 442 receiving yards and one receiving touchdown.

==== 2003 season ====
On September 14, 2003, Lewis broke Corey Dillon's single-game rushing record of 278 yards by running for 295 yards in Week 2 against the Cleveland Browns. Lewis's record-breaking game earned him AFC Offensive Player of the Week for Week 2. Lewis's record-breaking game started a streak of six consecutive games going over 100 rushing yards. The streak included two games with over 150 scrimmage yards, Week 4 against the Kansas City Chiefs and Week 8 against the Denver Broncos. In Week 14, against the Cincinnati Bengals, he had 30 carries for 180 rushing yards and three rushing touchdowns in the 31–13 victory. In Week 16, against the Cleveland Browns, he had 22 carries for 205 rushing yards in the 35–0 victory. He earned AFC Offensive Player of the Week honors for Week 16. For the month of December, he earned AFC Offensive Player of the Month. Lewis was rewarded for his 2003 season performance by being named NFL Offensive Player of the Year by the Associated Press. Lewis's single-game rushing record was later broken by Adrian Peterson of the Minnesota Vikings on November 4, 2007, when he ran for 296 yards against the San Diego Chargers. He was named to the Pro Bowl and earned first team All-Pro honors. In the 2003 season, Lewis led the NFL in rushing with 2,066 yards, falling just 40 yards short of officially breaking the all-time single-season rushing record, which remains Eric Dickerson's 2,105 record-breaking yards in 1984. Lewis became the fifth running back to join the 2,000 rushing yards club. In addition, he tallied 14 rushing touchdowns. He was named MVP and Offensive Player of the Year by the PFWA.

==== 2004 season ====
In Week 3 of the 2004 season, Lewis had 18 carries for 186 rushing yards and one rushing touchdown to go with a 46-yard reception in the 23–9 victory over the Cincinnati Bengals. In Week 17, he had 34 carries for 167 rushing yards and one rushing touchdown in the 30–23 victory over the Miami Dolphins. In the 2004 season, Lewis appeared in and started 12 games. He finished with 235 carries for 1,006 rushing yards and 12 rushing touchdowns to go along with ten receptions for 116 receiving yards.

==== 2005 season ====
In the 2005 season, Lewis appeared and started in 15 games. He finished with 269 carries for 906 rushing yards and three rushing touchdowns to go along with 32 carries for 191 receiving yards and one receiving touchdown. After the 2005 season, the Ravens declined to place the franchise tag on Lewis, making him an unrestricted free agent after the end of the season. This move was seen by many as a formality in letting Lewis move to another team. Popular speculation blamed Lewis's steadily declining performance since the 2003 season. Lewis had also voiced displeasure during the 2005 season over the team's failure to sign him to a long-term deal. Despite these events, the Ravens re-signed Lewis on March 13, 2006, with a three-year deal, despite having signed former Denver Broncos running back Mike Anderson, who was widely thought to be Lewis's replacement.

==== 2006 season ====
On November 19, 2006, Lewis rushed for a season-high three touchdowns against the Atlanta Falcons. He ended the season with 314 carries for 1,132 rushing yards and nine rushing touchdowns. On February 28, 2007, the Ravens announced that they released Lewis. However, general manager Ozzie Newsome pointed out that they hoped to re-sign him, but that changed on March 7, 2007, when Lewis signed a contract with the Cleveland Browns.

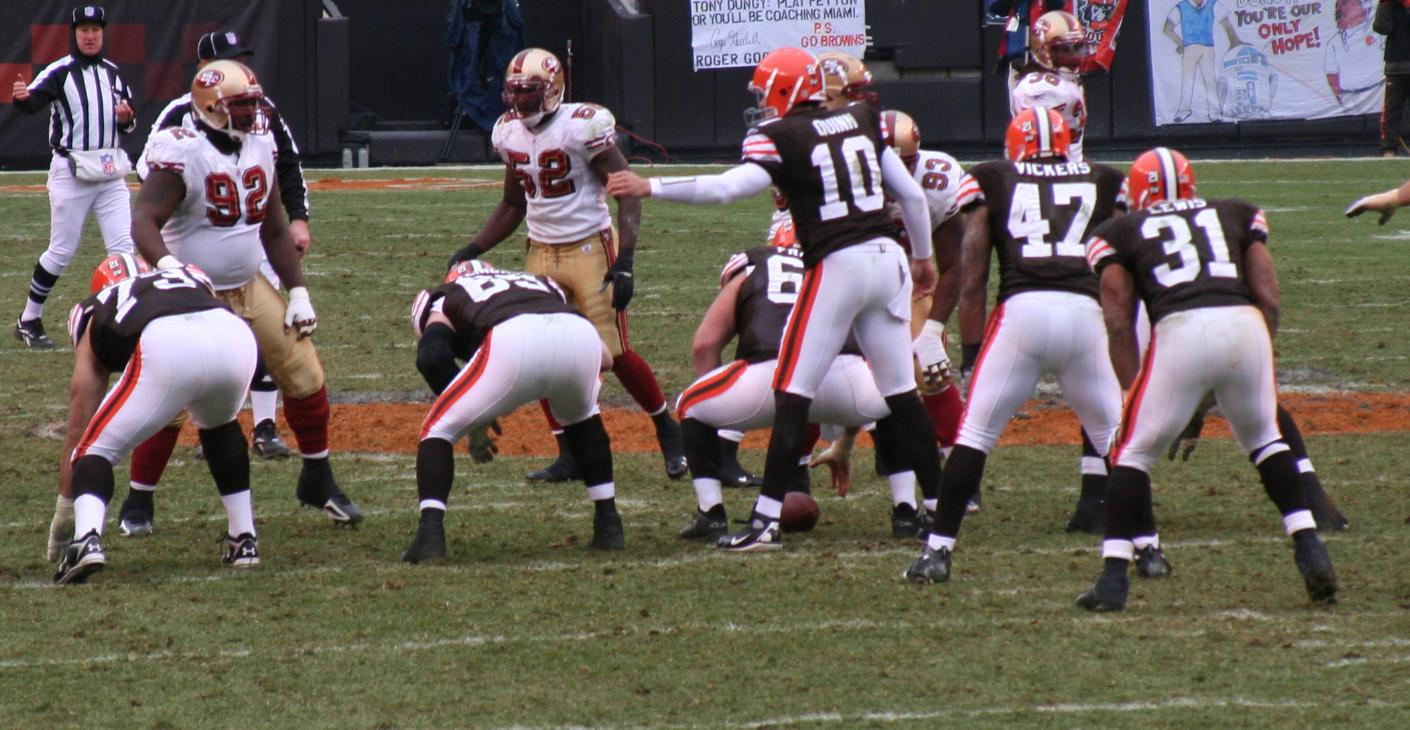
Lewis (#31) lines up to play the San Francisco 49ers in December 2007.

=== Cleveland Browns ===
==== 2007 season ====
After joining the Browns, Lewis became the team's starting running back. In Week 2, he had 27 carries for 216 rushing yards and one touchdown in a 51–45 victory over the Cincinnati Bengals. In Week 12, against the Houston Texans, he had 29 carries for 134 rushing yards and one rushing touchdown. In Week 15, against the Buffalo Bills, he had 33 carries for 163 rushing yards in the 8–0 victory. Lewis had his first 1,300-plus-yard season since 2003 in his first season with the Browns, rushing for 1,304 yards and nine touchdowns. He finished fifth in the league in rushing yards.

==== 2008 season ====
On November 8, 2008, The Plain Dealer reported that Lewis was dissatisfied with the performance of his teammates in the Browns' recent loss to the Denver Broncos. Lewis stated, "This is the NFL, you can't call it quits until the game is over." Lewis went on to say "it looks to me like some people called it quits before that. Denver was down, but they didn't call it quits. They kept their heads up and they finished. We didn't do that two weeks in a row—at home." Without naming names, Lewis said: "Some people need to check their egos at the door and find some heart to come out here and play hard. This is a man's game. The way we went out there and played two weeks in a row, finishing the same kind of way, it's not there. I think there are some men around here that need to check theirselves, straight up. That's it." In the 2008 season, Lewis started in all 16 games for the Browns. He finished with 279 carries for 1,002 rushing yards and four rushing touchdowns to go along with 23 receptions for 178 receiving yards.

==== 2009 season ====
In Week 5 of the 2009 season, Lewis had 31 carries for 117 rushing yards in the 6–3 victory over the Buffalo Bills. On November 2, 2009, Lewis announced he would retire after the 2009 season. Late in the 2009 season, Lewis was placed on injured reserve, ending his season. In the 2009 season, Lewis appeared in nine games and started eight. He finished with 143 carries for 500 rushing yards to go along with eight receptions for 88 receiving yards. On February 17, 2010, the Browns released Lewis. Lewis did not sign with another NFL team after his release from the Browns.

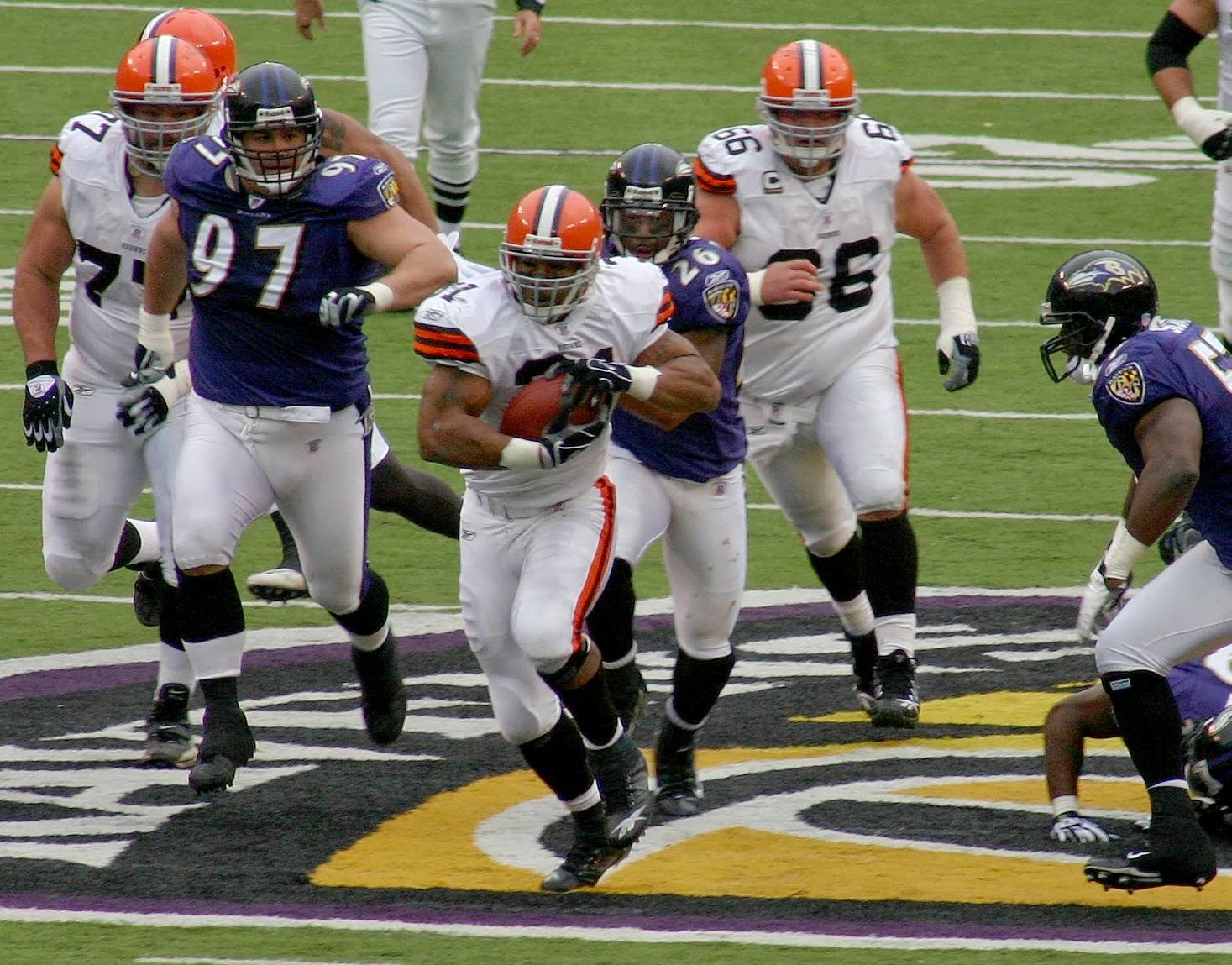
Lewis during the Cleveland Browns' 33–30 OT win over the Baltimore Ravens on November 18, 2007

== Career statistics ==
Legend
	AP NFL Offensive Player of the Year
	Won the Super Bowl
	Led the league
**Bold**	Career high

=== NFL ===
==== Regular season ====
Year	Team	Games		Rushing					Receiving					Fumbles		
Year	Team	GP	GS	Att	Yds	Avg	Lng	TD	Rec	Yds	Avg	Lng	TD	Fum	Lost	Rec
2000	BAL	16	13	309	1,364	4.4	45	6	27	296	11.0	45	0	6	2	**3**
2001	BAL	0	0	Did not play due to injury												
2002	BAL	16	15	308	1,327	4.3	75	6	**47**	**442**	9.4	**77**	1	**8**	**7**	1
2003	BAL	16	16	**387**	**2,066**	**5.3**	**82**	**14**	26	205	7.9	26	0	**8**	6	1
2004	BAL	12	12	235	1,006	4.3	75	7	10	116	**11.6**	46	0	2	0	1
2005	BAL	15	15	269	906	3.4	25	3	32	191	6.0	15	1	5	5	0
2006	BAL	16	16	314	1,132	3.6	52	9	18	115	6.4	15	0	4	2	1
2007	CLE	15	15	298	1,304	4.4	66	9	30	248	8.3	34	**2**	4	2	1
2008	CLE	16	16	279	1,002	3.6	29	4	23	178	7.7	18	0	2	1	0
2009	CLE	9	8	143	500	3.5	18	0	8	88	11.0	19	0	0	0	0
Career		131	126	2,542	10,607	4.2	82	58	221	1,879	8.5	77	4	39	25	8

==== Postseason ====
Year	Team	Games		Rushing					Receiving					Fumbles		
Year	Team	GP	GS	Att	Yds	Avg	Lng	TD	Rec	Yds	Avg	Lng	TD	Fum	Lost	Rec
2000	BAL	4	3	**103**	**338**	3.3	**27**	**4**	**5**	**40**	**8.0**	**15**	0	**1**	**1**	**1**
2001	BAL	0	0	Did not play due to injury												
2003	BAL	1	1	14	35	2.5	8	0	2	4	2.0	6	0	0	0	0
2006	BAL	1	1	13	53	**4.1**	18	0	3	24	**8.0**	13	0	0	0	0
Career		6	5	130	426	3.3	27	4	10	68	6.8	15	0	1	1	1

=== College ===
Season	Team	GP	Rushing				Receiving		
Season	Team	GP	Att	Yds	Avg	TD	Rec	Yds	TD
1997	Tennessee	12	**232**	**1,364**	5.9	**7**	**23**	**266**	**2**
1998	Tennessee	5	73	497	**6.8**	3	1	16	1
1999	Tennessee	10	182	816	4.5	**7**	15	193	1
Career		27	487	2,677	5.5	17	39	475	4

== Personal life ==
In February 2004, it surfaced that Lewis had been involved in talks about a drug deal. Lewis was charged with conspiring to possess with the intent to distribute five kilograms of cocaine and using a cell phone in the commission of the first count. Lewis reached a plea agreement with prosecutors in October 2004 and ultimately, Lewis was sentenced in January 2005 to four months in federal prison. He was released on June 2, 2005. In February 2026, Lewis was granted a pardon by president Donald Trump alongside four other former NFL players.

In January 2015, Lewis began working as the Vice President of Business and Development for Metro Exhibits, a trade-show exhibits company.

A Bleacher Report profile detailed Lewis's post-NFL life, noting that he suffers from the post-traumatic effects of concussions. He is currently the President of Southeast Exhibits and Metro Retail Solutions for Metro Exhibits.

=== Financial problems ===
In April 2010, Lewis filed for bankruptcy in Georgia listing $14.5 million in assets and $10.6 million in debts including a judgement of more than $350,000 on a loan defaulted from the bank whose name hangs over the Ravens' stadium.

On October 31, 2011, Regions Bank filed suit against Lewis over an unpaid $660,000 loan.

On February 8, 2015, a championship ring from Super Bowl XLVII that Lewis had owned was sold at auction for more than $50,000. Lewis had received the ring from Baltimore Ravens owner Stephen Bisciotti in honor of his status as one of the all-time great Ravens players. According to the Ravens organization, Lewis sold the ring due to financial difficulties.
