= Lawrence Smith (American football) =

American football player (born 1979)

No. 75, 72
- Position: Offensive lineman

Personal information
- Born: August 16, 1979 (age 47); Atlanta, Georgia, U.S.
- Listed height: 6 ft 3 in (1.91 m)
- Listed weight: 295 lb (134 kg)

Career information
- High school: Booker T. Washington (Atlanta)
- College: Tennessee State (1997–2001)
- NFL draft: 2002: undrafted

Career history
- Baltimore Ravens (2002–2003); → Amsterdam Admirals (2003); Buffalo Bills (2004–2005)
- Stats at Pro Football Reference

Lawrence Anthony Smith Jr. (born August 16, 1979) is an American former professional football offensive lineman who played for the Buffalo Bills of the National Football League (NFL). He played college football for the Tennessee State Tigers.

== Early life ==
Lawrence Anthony Smith Jr. was born on August 16, 1979, in Atlanta, Georgia. He attended Booker T. Washington High School in Atlanta.

== College career ==
Smith enrolled at Tennessee State University to play college football for the Tigers. He redshirted the 1997 season and was a four-year letterman from 1998 to 2001.

== Professional career ==
After going undrafted in the 2002 NFL draft, Smith signed with the Baltimore Ravens on April 26, 2002. He was waived on August 30 and signed to the team's practice squad on September 3. He was promoted to the active roster on December 3, 2002, but did not play in any games during the 2002 season. In 2003, the Ravens allocated Smith to NFL Europe to play for the Amsterdam Admirals. He started all ten games at offensive tackle for the Admirals during the 2003 NFL Europe season. Amsterdam finished the year with a 4–6 record. Smith was waived by Baltimore on August 30, 2003, and signed to the Raven's practice squad on September 2, 2003, where he spent the entire 2003 NFL season.

Smith became a free agent after the 2003 season, signing a reserve/future contact with the Buffalo Bills on January 28, 2004. He impressed the Bills during training camp in 2004. On August 18, 2004, it was reported that Smith had been promoted to starting left guard. He played in all 16 games, starting eight, as an offensive guard during the 2004 season. He was waived/injured on August 10, 2005, and reverted to injured reserve the next day. Smith spent the entire 2005 season on injured reserve and became a free agent afterwards.
