= 2000 All-Pro Team =

Official list of the best NFL players in 2000

The 2000 All-Pro Team is composed of the National Football League players that were named to the Associated Press, Pro Football Writers Association, and The Sporting News All-Pro Teams in 2000. Both first and second teams are listed for the AP team. These are the three teams that are included in Total Football II: The Official Encyclopedia of the National Football League. In 2000, the Pro Football Writers Association and Pro Football Weekly combined their All-pro teams, a practice with continues through 2008. In 2000 the AP did not have a separate "fullback" position.

== Teams ==
Offense
Position	First team	Second team
Quarterback	Rich Gannon, Oakland Raiders (AP, PFWA, TSN)	Peyton Manning, Indianapolis Colts (AP-2)
Running back	Eddie George, Tennessee Titans (AP, PFWA); Marshall Faulk, St. Louis Rams (AP, PFWA, TSN); Edgerrin James, Indianapolis Colts (TSN)	Edgerrin James, Indianapolis Colts (AP-2); Robert Smith, Minnesota Vikings (AP-2)
Wide receiver	Randy Moss, Minnesota Vikings (AP, PFWA, TSN); Marvin Harrison, Indianapolis Colts (PFWA, TSN); Terrell Owens, San Francisco 49ers (AP)	Rod Smith, Denver Broncos (AP-2); Marvin Harrison, Indianapolis Colts (AP-2)
Tight end	Tony Gonzalez, Kansas City Chiefs (AP, PFWA, TSN)	Frank Wycheck, Tennessee Titans (AP-2t); Chad Lewis, Philadelphia Eagles (AP-2t)
Tackle	Kyle Turley, New Orleans Saints (AP); Willie Roaf, New Orleans Saints (PFWA); Orlando Pace, St. Louis Rams (TSN); Jonathan Ogden, Baltimore Ravens (AP, PFWA, TSN)	Willie Roaf, New Orleans Saints (AP-2); Orlando Pace, St. Louis Rams (AP-2)
Guard	Larry Allen, Dallas Cowboys (AP, PFWA, TSN); Bruce Matthews, Tennessee Titans (AP, PFWA, TSN)	Ruben Brown, Buffalo Bills (AP-2); Steve Wisniewski, Oakland Raiders (AP-2)
Center	Tom Nalen, Denver Broncos (AP, TSN); Kevin Mawae, New York Jets (PFWA)	Kevin Mawae, New York Jets (AP-2)

Special teams
Position	First team	Second team
Kicker	Matt Stover, Baltimore Ravens (AP, PFWA, TSN)	Martín Gramática, Tampa Bay Buccaneers (AP-2)
Punter	Shane Lechler, Oakland Raiders (AP, TSN); Darren Bennett, San Diego Chargers (PFWA)	Chris Gardocki, Cleveland Browns (AP-2)
Kick Returner	Derrick Mason, Tennessee Titans (AP, PFWA, TSN)	Darrick Vaughn, Atlanta Falcons (AP-2)
Punt Returner	Az-Zahir Hakim, St. Louis Rams (PFWA, TSN)	
Special Teams	Michael Bates, Carolina Panthers (PFWA)	

Defense
Position	First team	Second team
Defensive end	Jason Taylor, Miami Dolphins (AP, PFWA, TSN); Hugh Douglas, Philadelphia Eagles (AP, PFWA, TSN)	Trace Armstrong, Miami Dolphins (AP-2); Rob Burnett, Baltimore Ravens (AP-2)
Defensive tackle	Warren Sapp, Tampa Bay Buccaneers (AP, PFWA, TSN); La'Roi Glover, New Orleans Saints (AP, PFWA, TSN)	Keith Hamilton, New York Giants (AP-2); Sam Adams, Baltimore Ravens (AP-2)
Inside linebacker	Ray Lewis, Baltimore Ravens (AP, PFWA, TSN); Jeremiah Trotter, Philadelphia Eagles (AP)	Randall Godfrey, Tennessee Titans (AP-2); Stephen Boyd, Detroit Lions (AP-2t); Sam Cowart, Buffalo Bills (AP-2t)
Outside linebacker	Junior Seau, San Diego Chargers (AP, PFWA, TSN); Derrick Brooks, Tampa Bay Buccaneers (AP, PFWA, TSN)	Mo Lewis, New York Jets (AP-2); Jessie Armstead, New York Giants (AP-2)
Cornerback	Samari Rolle, Tennessee Titans (AP, PFWA, TSN); Sam Madison, Miami Dolphins (AP, PFWA, TSN)	Charles Woodson, Oakland Raiders (AP-2); Champ Bailey, Washington Redskins (AP-2)
Safety	John Lynch, Tampa Bay Buccaneers (AP, PFWA, TSN); Darren Sharper, Green Bay Packers (AP, PFWA, TSN)	Blaine Bishop, Tennessee Titans (AP-2); Rod Woodson, Baltimore Ravens (AP-2)

== Key ==
- AP = Associated Press first-team All-Pro
- AP-2 = Associated Press second-team All-Pro
- AP-2t = Tied for second-team All-Pro in the AP vote
- PFWA = Pro Football Writers Association All-NFL
- TSN = The Sporting News All-Pro
