= Reggie Waddell =

American football player (born 1977)

No. 37, 19
- Position: Defensive back

Personal information
- Born: November 14, 1977 (age 48); Houston, Texas, U.S.
- Listed height: 6 ft 0 in (1.83 m)
- Listed weight: 185 lb (84 kg)

Career information
- High school: Willowridge (Houston)
- College: Dodge City (1996–1998); Western Illinois (1999–2000)
- NFL draft: 2001: undrafted

Career history
- Baltimore Ravens (2001–2002); Detroit Fury (2003–2004)

Awards and highlights
- Second-team All-Gateway (2000); First-team All-KJCCC (1998); Second-team All-KJCCC (1997)

Career NFL statistics
- Games played: 1
- Stats at Pro Football Reference

Career AFL statistics
- Tackles: 35
- Pass deflections: 5
- Forced fumbles: 1
- Receptions: 2
- Receiving yards: 20
- Stats at ArenaFan.com

Reginald Duane Waddell (born November 14, 1977) is an American and former professional football defensive back who played in the National Football League (NFL) for the Baltimore Ravens. He played college football for the Dodge City Conquistadors and Western Illinois Leathernecks.

== Early life ==
Waddell was born on November 14, 1977, in Houston, Texas. He attended Willowridge High School in Houston.

== College career ==
Waddell played college football for the Dodge City Conquistadors from 1996 to 1998 and the Western Illinois Leathernecks from 1999 to 2000. He earned first and second-team All-KJCCC in 1998 and 1997 respectively.

Ahead of the 1999 season, Waddell transferred to Texas A&M University. He was dismissed from the team for academic reasons. Waddell subsequently transferred to Western Illinois University. In 2000, Waddell had 45 tackles and three interceptions. He was named to the second-team All-Gateway team.

== Professional career ==
=== Baltimore Ravens ===
After going undrafted in the 2001 NFL draft, Waddell signed with the Baltimore Ravens as an undrafted free agent. he made the initial roster and played in the first game against the Chicago Bears. On September 10, Waddell was released by the team. On September 18, he was signed to the practice squad. On January 22, 2002, Waddell signed a futures contract with the team. On September 1, he was released.

=== Detroit Fury ===
On December 18, 2002, Waddell signed with the Detroit Fury of the Arena Football League (AFL). He played two seasons, recording 35 tackles, five pass break ups, one forced fumble and two receptions for 20 yards in 14 games.
