= Kipp Vickers =

American football player (born 1969)

No. 71, 79, 77, 70
- Positions: Guard, tackle

Personal information
- Born: August 27, 1969 (age 57); Miami, Florida, U.S.
- Listed height: 6 ft 2 in (1.88 m)
- Listed weight: 300 lb (136 kg)

Career information
- High school: Tarpon Springs (FL)
- College: Miami (FL)
- NFL draft: 1993: undrafted

Career history
- Indianapolis Colts (1993–1997); → Frankfurt Galaxy (1995); Washington Redskins (1998–1999); Baltimore Ravens (2000–2001); Washington Redskins (2002)

Awards and highlights
- Super Bowl champion (XXXV); 2× National champion (1989, 1991)

Career NFL statistics
- Games played: 72
- Games started: 24
- Stats at Pro Football Reference

Kipp Emmanuel Vickers (born August 27, 1969) is an American former professional football player who was an offensive guard in the National Football League (NFL) for the Indianapolis Colts, Washington Redskins, and the Baltimore Ravens. He played college football for the Miami Hurricanes.

Vickers played high school football at Tarpon Springs High School helping take the Spongers to the 1986 state 4A championship game where they lost to Ft. Lauderdale Dillard. At the University of Miami, he won national championships in 1989 and 1991.
