= Larry Webster =

American football player (born 1969)

No. 79, 75
- Positions: Defensive tackle, defensive end

Personal information
- Born: January 18, 1969 (age 57); Elkton, Maryland, U.S.
- Listed height: 6 ft 5 in (1.96 m)
- Listed weight: 297 lb (135 kg)

Career information
- High school: Elkton (Elkton, Maryland)
- College: Maryland
- NFL draft: 1992: 3rd round, 70th overall pick

Career history
- Miami Dolphins (1992–1994); Cleveland Browns (1995); Baltimore Ravens (1996–2001); New York Jets (2002)

Awards and highlights
- Super Bowl champion (XXXV); 2× Second-team All-ACC (1989, 1990)

Career NFL statistics
- Tackles: 186
- Sacks: 4
- Fumble recoveries: 2
- Stats at Pro Football Reference

Larry Melvin Webster Jr. (born January 18, 1969) is an American former professional football player who was a defensive tackle for 11 seasons in the National Football League (NFL). He played college football at University of Maryland.

== Early life ==
A native of Elkton, Maryland, Webster graduated from Elkton High School where he was a letterman in football, basketball and track and field. His primary football position at the time was running back. He attended the University of Maryland on a full athletic scholarship. With the Terrapins football team, he made the transition to defensive lineman and was its Most Valuable Player in his senior year.

== Professional career ==
Webster was selected in the third round of the 1992 NFL draft by the Miami Dolphins as a defensive tackle. Webster spent some mediocre years in Miami before signing with the Cleveland Browns in 1995 as a backup. The Browns moved from Cleveland to Baltimore (near where Webster grew up) in 1996 to become the Baltimore Ravens. Webster had some success with the Ravens. Webster was suspended by the NFL early in the 2000 season for minor legal issues. Later that same season, he earned his only Super Bowl ring when the Ravens beat the New York Giants 34–7 in Super Bowl XXXV. Webster spent one more year with Baltimore before signing with the New York Jets in 2002.

== After football ==
With help from Rex Ryan, Webster participated for three straight summers in the NFL Minority Coaching Fellowship Program with the Ravens in 2007 and 2008 and the Jets in 2009. He has been a football coach at Baltimore Polytechnic Institute since 2009. After three years as a volunteer assistant working primarily with the defensive linemen, he became the Engineers' head coach in 2012.
