= Alvin Porter =

American football player (born 1976)

No. 24
- Position: Cornerback

Personal information
- Born: May 10, 1977 (age 49); Shreveport, Louisiana, U.S.
- Listed height: 5 ft 11 in (1.80 m)
- Listed weight: 175 lb (79 kg)

Career information
- High school: Dallas (TX) Adamson
- College: Oklahoma State

Career history
- Baltimore Ravens (2001–2003); Cincinnati Bengals (2004)*; New Orleans VooDoo (2005); Kansas City Brigade (2006)
- * Offseason or practice squad member only

Awards and highlights
- AFL All-Rookie Team (2005)

Career NFL statistics
- Games played: 33
- Tackles: 55
- Sacks: 0
- Interceptions: 1
- Stats at Pro Football Reference

Career AFL statistics
- Tackles: 61
- Sacks: 0
- Interceptions: 1
- Stats at ArenaFan.com

Alvin Guy Porter (born May 10, 1977) is an American former professional football player who was a cornerback for three seasons with the Baltimore Ravens in the National Football League. He played college football for the Oklahoma State Cowboys.
