= Jeff Friday =

American football coach (born 1966)

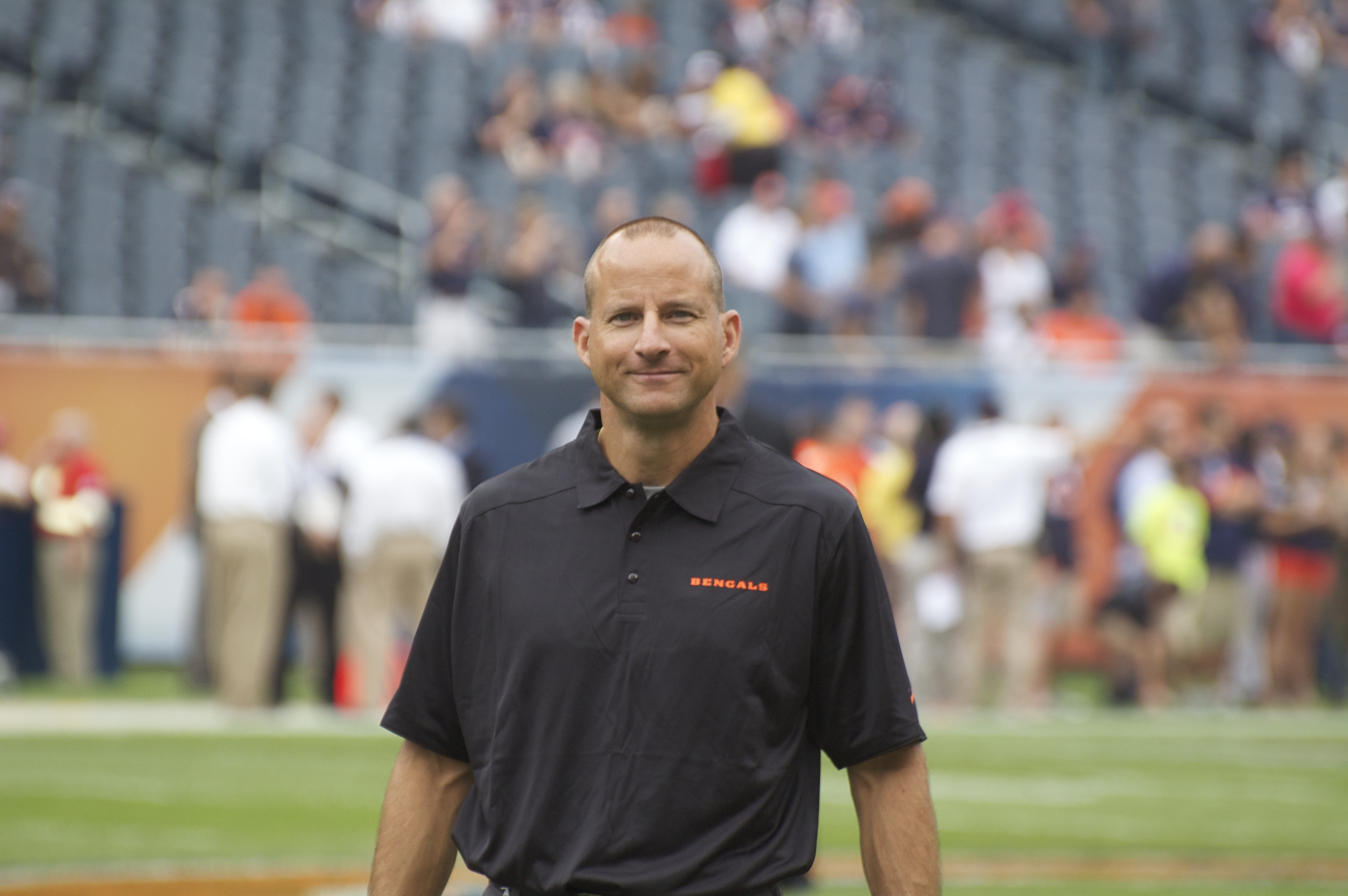
- Friday preparing the Cincinnati Bengals for the Chicago Bears, 2013.

Personal information
- Born: October 11, 1966 (age 60); Milwaukee, Wisconsin

Career history
- Northwestern (1992–1996) Assistant strength and conditioning coach; Minnesota Vikings (1996–1999) Assistant strength and conditioning coach; Baltimore Ravens (1999-2008) Head strength and conditioning coach; Cincinnati Bengals (2010–2019) Assistant strength and conditioning coach; DC Defenders (2019–2020) Head strength and conditioning coach

Awards and highlights
- Super Bowl XXXV champion as a coach; 2000 Strength and Conditioning coach of the year

Jeff Friday (born October 11, 1966) is an American football coach. He served as a strength and conditioning coach for 21 seasons in the National Football League, with the Minnesota Vikings, Baltimore Ravens and Cincinnati Bengals. He won Super Bowl XXXV with the Baltimore Ravens in 2000. He was also the head strength and conditioning coach for the DC Defenders of the XFL (2020).

== Coaching career ==
Friday began his coaching career at Northwestern University in 1992 as an assistant strength and conditioning coach. During his tenure, the Northwestern Wildcats football team attended the Rose Bowl Game and the men's basketball team attended the National Invitation Tournament (1994).

Friday spent 3 seasons (1996-1999) with the Minnesota Vikings as an assistant strength and conditioning coach before serving 9 seasons with the Baltimore Ravens (1999-2008) as the head strength and conditioning coach. Under head coach Brian Billick, Friday worked with 6 future Hall of Fame players, and had 17 players attend the Pro Bowl. The 2000 Baltimore Ravens had a 12–4 record and became Super Bowl XXXV champions. Both Friday and Billick departed with the introduction of John Harbaugh in 2008.

Friday joined the United Football League in 2009 as the Director of Strength and Conditioning. He served one season, and the league ended 3 years after due to limited games and poor attendance.

In February 2010, Friday returned to the AFC North to become the assistant strength and conditioning coach of the Cincinnati Bengals during the tenure of head coach Marvin Lewis. Under Friday's tenure, the Bengals made the Playoffs 5 consecutive years (2011-2015) and sent 13 players to the Pro Bowl. Friday was released in early 2019, shortly after the introduction of head coach Zac Taylor.

Friday joined the DC Defenders of the XFL as the head strength and conditioning coach. The season was cut short due to COVID-19 restrictions. The Defenders had a 3–2 record, and were East division champions.

On November 16, Friday released his first book, 'Built 4 Winning', about his experiences within the NFL and strategies he used to compete.
