= Joe Maese =

American football player (born 1978)

No. 59, 53
- Position: Long snapper

Personal information
- Born: December 2, 1978 (age 47); Morenci, Arizona, U.S.
- Listed height: 6 ft 0 in (1.83 m)
- Listed weight: 241 lb (109 kg)

Career information
- High school: Cortez (Phoenix, Arizona)
- College: New Mexico
- NFL draft: 2001: 6th round, 194th overall pick

Career history
- Baltimore Ravens (2001-2004); Detroit Lions (2005); Baltimore Blackbirds (2007)

Career NFL statistics
- Games played: 65
- Fumble recoveries: 1
- Stats at Pro Football Reference

Joseph Michael Maese (born December 2, 1978) is an American former professional football player who was a long snapper in the National Football League (NFL). He played college football for the New Mexico Lobos and was selected by the Baltimore Ravens in the sixth round (194th overall) of the 2001 NFL draft. He was also a member of the NFL's Detroit Lions, as well as the Baltimore Blackbirds of the American Indoor Football Association.

== Professional career ==
Maese was selected by the Baltimore Ravens in the sixth round of the 2001 NFL draft. He was the first pure long snapper ever drafted and the only long snapper drafted that year. He played college football for the New Mexico Lobos. Maese also played for the Detroit Lions and the Baltimore Blackbirds of the American Indoor Football Association.

== Post-football ==
Following his professional football career, Maese was employed as a firefighter in Howard County, Maryland.
