= John Jones (tight end) =

American football player (born 1975)

Profile
- Position: Tight end

Personal information
- Born: April 4, 1975 (age 51); Cleveland, Ohio, U.S.
- Listed height: 6 ft 4 in (1.93 m)
- Listed weight: 255 lb (116 kg)

Career information
- High school: Glen Mills
- College: Pittsburgh; IUP
- NFL draft: 2000: undrafted

Career history
- Baltimore Ravens (2000–2003); Miami Dolphins (2004)*
- * Offseason or practice squad member only
- Stats at Pro Football Reference

John Jones (born April 4, 1975, in Cleveland, Ohio) is an American former professional football player who was a tight end for the Baltimore Ravens of the National Football League from 2000 to 2003. He played college football for the Pittsburgh Panthers.
