= 1994 Cleveland Browns season =

49th season in franchise history

- Owner: Art Modell
- Head coach: Bill Belichick
- Offensive coordinator: Steve Crosby
- Defensive coordinator: Nick Saban
- Home stadium: Cleveland Municipal Stadium

Results
- Record: 11–5
- Division place: 2nd AFC Central
- Playoffs: Won Wild Card Playoffs (vs. Patriots) 20–13; Lost Divisional Playoffs (at Steelers) 9–29
- All-Pros: OT Tony Jones (2nd team); DT Michael Dean Perry (2nd team); FS Eric Turner (1st team); PR Eric Metcalf (1st team)
- Pro Bowlers: FB Leroy Hoard; RB Eric Metcalf; DE Rob Burnett; DT Michael Dean Perry; LB Pepper Johnson; FS Eric Turner

Uniform

The 1994 Cleveland Browns season was the team's 45th season with the National Football League and 49th overall. It was the only season that the Browns qualified for the playoffs under head coach Bill Belichick. The Browns finished as the NFL's number one defense in terms of points surrendered per game (12.8 points per game). In the playoffs, Belichick got his first playoff victory as a head coach in the AFC wild card game against the New England Patriots (who would hire him less than a decade later) by a score of 20–13. The Browns would lose to the Steelers 29–9 in the divisional round.

The Browns would not return to the playoffs again until the 2002 season. This would be the last time the Browns would win a playoff game until the 2020 season.

== Offseason ==
Additions	Subtractions
QB Mark Rypien (Redskins)	LB Clay Matthews (Falcons)
CB Don Griffin (49ers)	LB Mike Johnson (Lions)

=== NFL draft ===
1994 Cleveland Browns draft
Round	Pick	Player	Position	College	Notes
1	9	Antonio Langham	Cornerback	Alabama	1993 Jim Thorpe Award
1	29	Derrick Alexander	Wide receiver	Michigan	1992 All-American
3	75	Romeo Bandison	Defensive tackle	Oregon	
5	141	Issac Booth	Cornerback	California	
6	171	Robert Strait	Running back	Baylor	
7	203	Andre Hewitt	Offensive tackle	Clemson	
Made roster

=== Undrafted free agents ===
1994 undrafted free agents of note
Player	Position	College
Dean Lytle	Defensive end	Notre Dame

== Personnel ==
=== Staff ===
1994 Cleveland Browns staff
Front office: Owner and president – Art Modell; Director of player personnel – Michael Lombardi; Director of college scouting – Dom Anile; Head coaches: Head coach – Bill Belichick; Offensive coaches: Offensive coordinator – Steve Crosby; Quarterbacks – Rod Dowhower; Wide receivers – Mike Sheppard; Offensive line – Kirk Ferentz; Assistant offensive line/tight ends - Pat Hill; Offensive assistant – Ernie Adams	Defensive coaches: Defensive coordinator – Nick Saban; Defensive line – Jacob Burney; Linebackers – Woody Widenhofer; Defensive backs – Rick Venturi; Defensive quality control – Chuck Bresnahan; Special teams coaches: Special teams – Scott O'Brien; Coaching assistant – Kevin Spencer; Strength and conditioning: Strength and conditioning – Jerry Simmons; Assistant Strength/Pass Rush Consultant - Joe Kim

=== Roster ===
1994 Cleveland Browns roster
Quarterbacks (QB): 8 Brad Goebel; 11 Mark Rypien; 12 Vinny Testaverde; Running backs (RB): 23 Randy Baldwin; 20 Earnest Byner; 39 Frank Harvey; 33 Leroy Hoard FB; 21 Eric Metcalf; Wide receivers (WR): 85 Derrick Alexander; 83 Mark Carrier; 81 Michael Jackson; 87 Keenan McCardell; 84 Rico Smith; Tight ends (TE): 48 Frank Hartley; 88 Brian Kinchen LS; 80 Thomas McLemore	Offensive linemen (OL): 70 Herman Arvie T; 64 Mike Bedosky G; 77 Orlando Brown T; 72 Bob Dahl G; 69 Doug Dawson G; 61 Steve Everitt C; 66 Tony Jones T; 62 Gene Williams T; 63 Wally Williams G; Defensive linemen (DL): 97 Romeo Bandison DT; 90 Rob Burnett DE; 78 Dan Footman DE; 94 Bill Johnson DT; 96 James Jones DT; 95 Rick Lyle DE; 92 Michael Dean Perry DT; 98 Anthony Pleasant DE; 75 Pio Sagapolutele DE	Linebackers (LB): 58 Carl Banks OLB; 56 Mike Caldwell OLB; 51 Gerald Dixon OLB; 93 Travis Hill MLB; 52 Pepper Johnson MLB; 50 Frank Stams OLB; 54 Eddie Sutter MLB; Defensive backs (DB): 36 Issac Booth CB; 28 Don Griffin CB; 31 Stacey Hairston CB; 41 Tim Jacobs CB; 24 Reggie Jones CB; 38 Antonio Langham CB; 27 Stevon Moore SS; 42 Louis Riddick SS; 37 Bennie Thompson FS; 29 Eric Turner FS; Special teams (ST): 3 Matt Stover K; 7 Tom Tupa P	Practice squad: 60 Jed DeVries T; -- Shelby Hill WR; -- P.J. Killian LB; -- Carlson Leomiti G; -- Dinavon Bythwood LB; Reserve: -- Kerry Ferrell WR (IR); 99 Rich McKenzie LB (NF-Ill.); 89 Walter Reeves TE (IR); 79 Mike Schad G (IR); -- Greg Tremble S (IR); 44 Tommy Vardell FB (IR); 53 active, 6 inactive, 5 practice squad Rookies in italics

== Schedule ==
Week	Date	Opponent	Result	Record	Venue	Attendance
1	September 4	at **Cincinnati Bengals**	**W** 28–20	1–0	Riverfront Stadium	52,778
2	September 11	**Pittsburgh Steelers**	**L** 10–17	1–1	Cleveland Municipal Stadium	77,774
3	September 18	Arizona Cardinals	**W** 32–0	2–1	Cleveland Municipal Stadium	62,818
4	September 25	at Indianapolis Colts	**W** 21–14	3–1	RCA Dome	55,821
5	October 2	New York Jets	**W** 27–7	4–1	Cleveland Municipal Stadium	76,188
6	Bye					
7	October 13	at **Houston Oilers**	**W** 11–8	5–1	Houston Astrodome	50,364
8	October 23	**Cincinnati Bengals**	**W** 37–13	6–1	Cleveland Municipal Stadium	77,588
9	October 30	at Denver Broncos	**L** 14–26	6–2	Mile High Stadium	73,190
10	November 6	New England Patriots	**W** 13–6	7–2	Cleveland Municipal Stadium	73,878
11	November 13	at Philadelphia Eagles	**W** 26–7	8–2	Veterans Stadium	65,233
12	November 20	at Kansas City Chiefs	**L** 13–20	8–3	Arrowhead Stadium	69,121
13	November 27	**Houston Oilers**	**W** 34–10	9–3	Cleveland Municipal Stadium	65,088
14	December 4	New York Giants	**L** 13–16	9–4	Cleveland Municipal Stadium	72,068
15	December 10	at Dallas Cowboys	**W** 19–14	10–4	Texas Stadium	64,826
16	December 18	at **Pittsburgh Steelers**	**L** 7–17	10–5	Three Rivers Stadium	60,808
17	December 24	Seattle Seahawks	**W** 35–9	11–5	Cleveland Municipal Stadium	54,180
Note: Intra-division opponents are in **bold** text.

=== Standings ===
AFC Central
	W	L	T	PCT	PF	PA	STK
^{(1)} Pittsburgh Steelers	12	4	0	.750	316	234	L1
^{(4)} Cleveland Browns	11	5	0	.688	340	204	W1
Cincinnati Bengals	3	13	0	.188	276	406	W1
Houston Oilers	2	14	0	.125	226	352	W1

== Game summaries ==
- Week One @ Cincinnati

Both Vinny Testaverde and falling third-year Bengal David Klingler were picked off twice. Testaverde got the better of the first round of 1994's Battle Of Ohio as he raced the Browns to a 28–13 lead, enough to absorb a Klingler touchdown in the fourth to Darnay Scott. The Browns won 28–20.

- Week Two vs. Pittsburgh

The Steelers ended a four-game road losing streak to the Browns as they erased a 10–0 Browns lead with 17 unanswered points. Vinny Testaverde was picked off four times in the 17–10 loss.

=== Week 3: vs. Arizona ===
Week 3: Arizona Cardinals at Cleveland Browns – Game summary

Quarter	1	2	3	4	Total
Cardinals	0	0	0	0	0
Browns	0	3	15	14	32

at Cleveland Municipal Stadium, Cleveland, Ohio

- Date: September 18
- Game time: 1:00 p.m. EDT
- Game weather: 65 °F (18 °C), relative humidity 62%, round (wind) 11 mph (18 km/h)
- Game attendance: 62,818
- TV announcers (Fox): Kenny Albert (play–by–play) and Ron Pitts (color commentator)

Game information

First quarter

- No scoring plays

Second quarter

- CLE (1:31) – Stover 32 yard field goal
  Browns 3, Cardinals 0

Third quarter

- CLE (4:33) – Testaverde 1 yard rush (Stover kick)
  Browns 10, Cardinals 0
- CLE (11:52) – Vardell 16 yard pass from Testaverde (Tupa run)
  Browns 18, Cardinals 0

Fourth quarter

- CLE (6:19) – Alexander 81 yard pass from Testaverde (Stover kick)
  Browns 25, Cardinals 0
- CLE (13:00) – Turner 93 yard interception return (Stover kick)
  Browns 32, Cardinals 0

Top passers

- ARI – Jim McMahon 19/38, 169 yds, 2 INT
- CLE – Vinny Testaverde 17/27, 248 yds, 2 TD, 1 INT

Top rushers

- ARI – Jim McMahon 4 carr, 31 yds
- CLE – Earnest Byner 8 carr, 24 yds

Top receivers

- ARI – Larry Centers, 8 rec, 62 yds
- CLE – Derrick Alexander, 6 rec, 136 yds, 1 TD

Turnovers

- ARI – 3
- CLE – 2

The Browns hosted Buddy Ryan, now coach of the Cardinals after his tumultuous stay with the Oilers. Ryan had to bear witness as Vinny Testaverde tossed two touchdowns and ran in a third while Jay Schroeder and Jim McMahon combined for just 26 of 58 passes with three interceptions in a 32–0 Browns shutout win.

- Week Four @ Indianapolis

In a 21–14 Browns win, Testaverde threw three more touchdowns as the game lead tied or changed on every score. Testaverde's scores offset scores by Marshall Faulk and Jim Harbaugh, both destined to be important rivals of Browns coach Bill Belichick in the future.

- Week Five vs. New York Jets

Eight years after their infamous playoff meeting, the Jets and Browns renewed acquaintances and the Browns raced to a 27–0 lead before Jack Trudeau, subbing for regular starter Boomer Esiason, found the endzone from 24 yards out. Trudeau was picked off twice as well in the 27–7 Browns win. The game was the first meeting as head coaches of Jets coach Pete Carroll and Browns coach Bill Belichick.

- Week Six – BYE WEEK
- Week Seven @ Houston

On a rare Thursday Night NFL game, the collapse of the Oilers following their 1993 season continued as the Browns clawed out a Vinny Testaverde touchdown, a two-point conversion, and a field goal in the second quarter, offsetting a fourth-quarter score from Billy Joe Tolliver. The 11–8 loss put the Oilers at 1–5 with the Browns now 5–1.

- Week Eight vs. Cincinnati

The winless Bengals clawed to a 13–10 halftime lead, then the Browns exploded to 27 unanswered points en route to a 37–13 rout; one touchdown came off a goalline fumble by the Bengals. Former Redskins hero Mark Rypien came in late and completed three of eleven passes.

- Week Nine @ Denver

The Browns remained haunted by the ghost of their two bitter playoff failures to John Elway as Elway led a Broncos offense putting up 457 yards of offense and 26 points to offset two Matt Stover field goals and a touchdown from Mark Rypien. The 26–14 Broncos win was only the third of their season.

- Week 10 vs. New England

Bill Belichick faced his former boss Bill Parcells and got the better of Parcells and second-year quarterback Drew Bledsoe, intercepting him four times as Mark Rypien tossed a one-yard score to Leroy Hoard. The 13–6 outcome put the Browns at 7–2 while the Patriots fell to 3–6 awaiting the Vikings.

- Week 11 @ Philadelphia

The 7–2 Eagles were crushed 26–7 as Randall Cunningham was picked off once and held to just 242 yards of offense; the loss began a season-ending spiral for the Eagles and coach Rich Kotite.

- Week 12 @ Kansas City

Joe Montana managed only 169 passing yards but still got the better of the Browns 20–13 as three different passers for the Browns managed only 152 yards and a pick.

- Week 13 vs. Houston

The Browns completed a season sweep of the Oilers – now under new coach Jeff Fisher – 34–10, limiting the Oilers to 182 yards of offense.

- Week 14 vs. New York Giants

Facing his former team, Bill Belichick saw the Giants unable to reach 300 yards of offense yet still win 16–13, picking off Vinny Testaverde twice while sacking him four times. The game was a penalty-laden affair with 21 combined fouls for 162 yards.

- Week 15 @ Dallas

Once again Testaverde couldn't deliver much yardage – just 118 passing yards with one touchdown and one interception – but he did produce enough for a 19–14 win over the defending Super Bowl champions. The Browns picked off Troy Aikman twice while forcing two fumbles. Matt Stover's four field goals were sufficient for the win.

- Week 16 @ Pittsburgh

The measuring stick for the Browns has always been the Steelers and once again the Browns came up short, this time 17–7. Testaverde had one touchdown and two picks while Barry Foster rushed for 106 yards and Neil O'Donnell had 175 passing yards and a touchdown. The win locked up the AFC Central for the Steelers, but the Browns nonetheless were also in the playoffs.

- Week 17 vs. Seattle

Vinny Testaverde scored three times, once on the ground, as five different Cleveland backs combined for over 100 rushing yards and two additional scores in a 35–7 rout of the Seahawks. With vaunted 1993 rookie Rick Mirer faltering, two different Seahawks quarterbacks combined for 229 yards and a pick.

== Postseason ==
Round	Date	Opponent (seed)	Result	Record	Venue	Attendance	Recap
Wild Card	January 1, 1995	New England Patriots (5)	W 20–13	1–0	Cleveland Municipal Stadium	77,452	Recap
Divisional	January 7, 1995	at Pittsburgh Steelers (1)	L 9–29	1–1	Three Rivers Stadium	58,185	Recap

=== AFC Wild Card game ===
AFC Wild Card: New England Patriots at Cleveland Browns – Game Summary

Quarter	1	2	3	4	Total
Patriots	0	10	0	3	13
Browns	3	7	7	3	20

at Cleveland Municipal Stadium, Cleveland, Ohio

- Date: January 1, 1995
- Game time: 12:30 p.m. PDT
- Game weather: 40 °F (4 °C), relative humidity 94%, round (wind) 10 mph (16 km/h)
- TV: NBC
- Boxscore

Game information

First quarter

- CLE – Matt Stover 30-yard field goal. Browns 3–0

Second quarter

- NE – Leroy Thompson 13-yard pass from Drew Bledsoe Patriots 7–3
- CLE – Mark Carrier 5-yard pass from Vinny Testaverde (Matt Stover kick) Browns 10–7
- NE – Matt Bahr 23-yard field goal Tie 10–10

Third quarter

- CLE – Leroy Hoard 10-yard rush (Matt Stover kick) Browns 17–10

Fourth quarter

- CLE – Matt Stover 21-yard field goal Browns 20–10
- NE – Matt Bahr 33-yard field goal Browns 20–13

Top passers

- NE – Drew Bledsoe – 21/50, 235 yards, TD, 3 INT
- CLE – Vinny Testaverde – 20/30, 268 yards, TD

Top rushers

- NE – Corey Croom – 9 rushes, 35 yards
- CLE – Leroy Hoard – 17 rushes, 66 yards

Top receivers

- NE – Vincent Brisby – 6 rec, 83 yards
- CLE – Michael Jackson – 7 rec, 122 yards

The Browns intercepted three passes from New England quarterback Drew Bledsoe and halted an attempted comeback in the final minutes of the game to clinch the victory.

Aided by quarterback Vinny Testaverde's completions to receivers Michael Jackson and Derrick Alexander for gains of 27 and 23 yards, Cleveland moved the ball 74 yards in eight plays on their opening drive and scored on Matt Stover's 30-yard field goal. They got another chance to score when Louis Riddick returned an interception 16 yards to the Patriots 33, but they could only gain one yard on their next three plays and decided to punt.

In the second quarter, New England took a 7–3 lead on a 60-yard drive that ended with Bledsoe's 13-yard touchdown pass to running back Leroy Thompson. However, Cleveland tight end Brian Kinchen returned the kickoff 24 yards to Brown's 49-yard line and the team quickly drove 51 yards to retake the lead at 10–7, with Testaverde rushing twice for 14 yards and completing two passes for 29 total yards to Jackson on the way to throwing a 5-yard scoring pass to Mark Carrier. New England responded by driving 71 yards in 17 plays to score on a 23-yard field goal by Matt Bahr, tying the game at 10 going into halftime. The key play of the drive was a fake punt on fourth and 10 on the Browns 43, in which punter Pat O'Neill completed a 21-yard pass to Corwin Brown.

Cleveland started the third quarter with a drive to the Pats 17-yard line but lost the ball on an Eric Metcalf fumble that was recovered by Patriots defensive end Mike Pitts, the Browns' only turnover of the game. After forcing a punt, Cleveland drove 79 yards in nine plays. Testeverde completed a 25-yard pass to fullback Leroy Hoard and a 14-yarder to Jackson, while Hoard eventually finished the drive with a 10-yard touchdown run to put the Browns back in front at 17–10.[6]

New England had some success moving the ball on their next two drives, but both ended with Bledsoe interceptions. On the second one, Eric Turner picked off a pass from Bledsoe and returned the ball 28 yards to the New England 36 with seven minutes left in the game. From there, Cleveland managed to run the clock down to 3:36 before Stover's 21-yard field goal gave them a two-score lead at 20–10. However, New England put together a 63-yard drive to score on Bahr's 33-yard field goal with 1:33 remaining. New England then recovered the ensuing onside kick, but after gaining a first down, Bledsoe threw four straight incompletions and the ball was turned back to Cleveland on downs.

Testaverde finished the game 20/30 for 268 yards and a touchdown. His top target was Jackson, who caught seven passes for 122 yards. This was the last postseason win for the Cleveland Browns until the 2020 season.

This was the first postseason meeting between the Patriots and Browns.[3]

=== AFC Divisional Game ===
AFC Divisional Game: Cleveland Browns at Pittsburgh Steelers – Game Summary

Quarter	1	2	3	4	Total
Browns	0	3	0	6	9
Steelers	3	21	3	2	29

at Three Rivers Stadium, Pittsburgh, Pennsylvania

- Date: January 7, 1995
- Game time: 12:30 p.m. PDT
- Game weather: 33 °F (1 °C), relative humidity 85%, round (wind) 13 mph (21 km/h)
- TV: NBC
- Boxscore

Game information

First quarter

- PIT – Gary Anderson 39-yard field goal. Steelers 3–0

Second quarter

- PIT – Eric Green 2-yard pass from Neil O'Donnell (Gary Anderson kick) Steelers 10–0
- PIT – John Williams 26-yard run (Gary Anderson kick) Steelers 17–0
- CLE – Matt Stover 22-yard field goal Steelers 17–3
- PIT – Yancy Thigpen 9-yard pass from Neil O'Donnell (Gary Anderson kick) Steelers 24–3

Third quarter

- PIT – Gary Anderson 40-yard field goal Steelers 27–3

Fourth quarter

- CLE – Keenan McCardell 20-yard pass Vinny Testaverde (pass failed) Steelers 27–9
- PIT – Safety, Testaverde sacked in end zone Steelers 29–9

Top passers

- CLE – Vinny Testaverde – 13/31, 144 yards, TD, 2 INT
- PIT – Neil O'Donnell – 16/23, 186 yards, 2 TD

Top rushers

- CLE – Ernest Byner – 9 rushes, 43 yards
- PIT – Barry Foster – 24 rushes, 133 yards

Top receivers

- CLE – Keenan McCardell – 3 rec, 47 yards, TD
- PIT – Ernie Mills – 5 rec, 117 yards

Pittsburgh had defeated Cleveland twice during the season and proved to be more than capable of doing so again. Aided by running back Barry Foster's 133 rushing yards, the Steelers controlled the game by scoring on their first three possessions and holding the ball for 42:27. The Steelers finished the game with 424 yards of offense, including 238 yards on the ground, while holding the Browns to a mere 186 total yards.

On Pittsburgh's opening drive, they moved the ball 65 yards in 13 plays to score on Gary Anderson's 39-yard field goal. Cleveland had to punt on their next drive, and Tom Tupa's kick went just 26 yards to the Steelers' 47-yard line. Pittsburgh then went 53 yards in eight plays, including a 21-yard completion from Neil O'Donnell to Ernie Mills, to go up 10–0 on O'Donnell's 2-yard touchdown pass to tight end Eric Green. On the Steelers' next possession, Foster rushed three times for 40 yards as the team drove 74 yards to score on John L. Williams' 26-yard touchdown burst with 9:03 left in the second quarter.

After being completely dominated up to this point, Cleveland finally caught a break when Mark Carrier returned Mark Royals' 43-yard punt 20 yards to the Steelers 30-yard line, leading to Matt Stover's 22-yard field goal to cut the lead to 17–3, but in the closing seconds of the quarter, Steelers cornerback Tim McKyer intercepted a pass from Cleveland quarterback Vinny Testaverde and returned it 21 yards to the Browns 6-yard line. O'Donnell then completed a 9-yard touchdown to wide receiver Yancey Thigpen with 16 seconds left in the first half.

In the third quarter, the Steelers drove 72 yards to go up 27–3 on a 40-yard Anderson field goal. In the final quarter, the Browns took advantage of a 35-yard pass interference penalty on Steelers cornerback Deon Figures, converting it into a score with Testaverde's 20-yard touchdown pass to wide receiver Keenan McCardell. But on their next drive, the Cleveland quarterback was sacked in the end zone by Pittsburgh safety Carnell Lake for a safety with 2:45 left in the game.

O'Donnell finished the game 18/23 for 186 yards and two touchdowns. His top receiver was Mills, who caught five passes for 117 yards. This was the first playoff win for Steelers coach Bill Cowher, who had watched his team get eliminated from the playoffs in the first round in each of the past two seasons.

This was the first postseason meeting between the Browns and Steelers.[3]
