= Brent Jones =

American football player (born 1963)

No. 88, 84
- Position: Tight end

Personal information
- Born: February 12, 1963 (age 63); San Jose, California, U.S.
- Listed height: 6 ft 4 in (1.93 m)
- Listed weight: 230 lb (104 kg)

Career information
- High school: Leland (San Jose)
- College: Santa Clara (1981–1985)
- NFL draft: 1986: 5th round, 135th overall pick

Career history

Playing
- Pittsburgh Steelers (1986)*; San Francisco 49ers (1987–1997)
- * Offseason or practice squad member only

Coaching
- Monte Vista High School (2007)

Awards and highlights
- 3× Super Bowl champion (XXIII, XXIV, XXIX); 2× Second-team All-Pro (1993, 1994); 4× Pro Bowl (1992–1995); San Francisco 49ers Hall of Fame; NCAA Division II All-American (1985); WFC Offensive Player of the Year (1985); 3× First-team All-WFC (1983–1985); Division II Football Team of the Quarter Century (1975–2000)

Career NFL statistics
- Games: 143
- Games started: 125
- Receptions: 417
- Receiving yards: 5,195
- Receiving touchdowns: 33
- Stats at Pro Football Reference
- College Football Hall of Fame

Brent Michael Jones (born February 12, 1963) is an American former professional football player, business executive, businessman, coach, and sports analyst. As a player, he was a tight end for the San Francisco 49ers during his entire 11-year career in the National Football League (NFL) from 1987 to 1997. Jones is listed among the top players in franchise history, and helped revolutionize the concept of the pass-catching tight end.

After playing college football at Santa Clara University, Jones was selected 135th overall by the Pittsburgh Steelers in the fifth round of the 1986 NFL draft. Cut after one season with the Steelers, he joined the 49ers during training camp in 1987. He went on to become the team's starting tight end in his third season after the retirement of John Frank and played with the 49ers for 11 seasons. He finished his 49ers career as the franchise's all-time leader in receptions (417), receiving yards (5,195) and receiving touchdowns (33) by a tight end, until Vernon Davis surpassed all three of those records. In the regular season, Jones played in 143 career games, winning 110 of them. In the playoffs, Jones played in 21 career games, starting 19 games, and winning 14 of them. Jones won nine NFC West titles with the 49ers. Jones finished his playoff career with 60 receptions for 740 receiving yards. Jones won three Super Bowls and was named All-Pro three times (1992–1994) and was selected to four Pro Bowls (1992–1995). These are all franchise records by a tight end. Jones never experienced a losing season and has one of the highest winning percentages in NFL history. Jerry Rice and Jones are considered the greatest wide receiver-tight end duo in NFL history.

== Early life ==
Brent Michael Jones was born on Tuesday, February 12, 1963, to Barbara and Mike Jones in San Jose, California. His father Mike is a former quarterback drafted by the Oakland Raiders in the 1961 AFL draft. Mike Jones played college football at San Jose State University for the Spartans and is a former high school football coach and teacher. Before going to bed, Jones would play a game with his father and his brother called 100 catches where they would each have to catch 100 straight passes. If they dropped one they would have to start all over. Jones attended Leland High School in San Jose, California, where he played football and baseball. In high school, he was a wide receiver in football and was a catcher in baseball. Due to a back injury, he did not play football his junior year and was a third-string football player his senior year. Despite his limited play, Leland's head football coach said at his team banquet, that he felt Jones had the most potential to play in the Pacific-10 Conference. In baseball, he was a First-team All-BVAL selection and his dream was to play Major League Baseball.

== College career ==
Jones did not find out he was going to attend Santa Clara University until he came back from his senior class trip to Hawaii. A standout high school baseball player, he was initially recruited to SCU with a baseball scholarship, but also played wide receiver on the football team. Due to injury, he was cut from the baseball team his second year and his focus and athletic scholarship was shifted to football.

Jones served as both a key blocker and primary receiving target in four years with Santa Clara. During his sophomore season, Jones made the shift from wide receiver to tight end. By the conclusion of his collegiate career, he had led the Broncos to two Western Football Conference championships. A three-time all-conference selection, Jones ranks second all-time in school history with 137 career receptions, fourth with 2,267 receiving yards, fourth in scoring with 200 points and third with 24 touchdown receptions.

=== Statistics ===
Brent Jones			Receiving		
Year	Team	GP	Rec	Yards	TDs
1982	Santa Clara	11		331	5
1983	Santa Clara	10		599	7
1984	Santa Clara	11		672	8
1985	Santa Clara	10		665	4
Total		42		2,267	24

== Professional career ==
=== 1986 NFL draft ===
Pre-draft measurables
Height	Weight
6 ft 4 in (1.93 m)	230 lb (104 kg)
All values from NFL Combine

Jones flew to New Orleans, Louisiana to participate in the NFL Combine. The Pittsburgh Steelers selected Jones with the 135th overall pick in the fifth round of the 1986 NFL Draft.

=== Pittsburgh Steelers ===
==== 1986 ====
On Sunday, May 11, while driving home on Mother's Day, Jones and his girlfriend Dana were both injured in a car accident after being hit by a drunk driver. The driver drove down the wrong side of the road in a massive head-on collision. Jones suffered a herniated disc in his neck and Dana broke her jaw on the steering wheel and dislocated her shoulder. In his only practice with the team, Jones reinjured his neck in a helmet-to-helmet collision. The Steelers kept him on the roster until about a month into the regular season. The team would finish the 1986 NFL season 6–10 and third in the AFC Central under Hall of Fame head coach Chuck Noll, failing to qualify for the 1986–87 NFL playoffs. Due to his later success in professional football with the San Francisco 49ers, Jones is considered the worst cut in the history of the Pittsburgh Steelers franchise.

=== San Francisco 49ers ===
==== 1987 ====
Jones joined his hometown team, the San Francisco 49ers, as a rookie backup during training camp. On Sunday, December 6, at Lambeau Field, in a 23–12 win over the Green Bay Packers, Jones made his NFL regular season debut, won his first career NFL regular season game, and recorded his first career reception on a 13-yard pass from quarterback Joe Montana. The team finished the strike-shortened 1987 NFL season 13–2 and first in the NFC West under Hall of Fame head coach Bill Walsh. Jones appeared in the last four games, finishing with two receptions for 35 receiving yards in Walsh's West Coast offense. On Saturday, January 9, 1988, at Candlestick Park, Jones made his NFL playoff debut in the 1987–88 NFL playoffs against the Minnesota Vikings and recorded his first career playoff reception on a seven-yard pass from quarterback Joe Montana.

==== 1988 ====
On Sunday, November 6, at Sun Devil Stadium, Jones caught his first career receiving touchdown against the Phoenix Cardinals. It was a three-yard pass from quarterback Steve Young that put the Niners up 23–0 in the third quarter. The team finished the 1988 NFL season 10–6 and first in the NFC West. Jones appeared in 11 games, finishing with eight receptions for 57 receiving yards and two receiving touchdowns. On Sunday, New Year's Day, January 1, 1989, at Candlestick Park, in a 34–9 win over the Minnesota Vikings, Jones won his first career playoff game. On Sunday, January 22, at Joe Robbie Stadium, in a 20–16 win over the AFC Champion Cincinnati Bengals in Super Bowl XXIII, the 49ers won their third Super Bowl in franchise history, giving Jones his first. For the 1988–89 NFL playoffs, Jones made two starts and appeared in three games, finishing with two receptions for 17 receiving yards.

==== 1989 ====
Jones emerged as a starter in the 1989 season, following the retirement of John Frank. The team finished the 1989 NFL season 14–2 and first in the NFC West under new head coach George Seifert. Jones started all 16 games, finishing with 40 receptions for 500 receiving yards and four receiving touchdowns. On Saturday, January 6, 1990, at Candlestick Park, in a 41–13 win over the Minnesota Vikings, Jones recorded his first career playoff receiving touchdown on an eight-yard pass from quarterback Joe Montana that put the Niners up 14–3 in the second quarter. On Sunday, January 28, at the Louisiana Superdome, in a 55–10 win over the AFC Champion Denver Broncos in Super Bowl XXIV, Jones and the 49ers won their second consecutive and fourth Super Bowl. Jones chipped in with his first Super Bowl reception and receiving touchdown on the same play; a seven-yard pass from quarterback Joe Montana to put the Niners up 13–3 in the first quarter. For the 1989–90 NFL playoffs, Jones made three starts, finishing with eight receptions for 77 receiving yards and a career-high three receiving touchdowns.

==== 1990 ====
On Sunday, September 23, at Candlestick Park, in a 19–13 win over the Atlanta Falcons, Jones recorded a career-high 125 receiving yards from quarterback Joe Montana in a single game. The team finished the 1990 NFL season 14–2 and first in the NFC West. Jones again started all 16 games, finishing with 56 receptions for a career-high 747 receiving yards and five receiving touchdowns. On Saturday, January 12, 1991, at Candlestick Park, in a 28–10 win over the Washington Redskins, Jones caught a career-long 47-yard pass from quarterback Joe Montana. It was the longest reception for yards in Jones’ career in the playoffs. For the 1990–91 NFL playoffs, Jones made two starts, finishing with seven receptions for a career-high 149 receiving yards.

==== 1991 ====
The team finished the 1991 NFL season 10–6. Jones made nine starts and appeared in ten games, finishing with 27 receptions for 417 receiving yards.

==== 1992 ====
The team finished the 1992 NFL season 14–2 and first in the NFC West. Jones started 15 games, finishing with 45 receptions for 628 receiving yards and four receiving touchdowns. He was selected to play in his first career Pro Bowl. For the 1992–93 NFL playoffs, Jones made two starts, finishing with seven receptions for 104 receiving yards and one receiving touchdown.

==== 1993 ====
On Sunday, October 3, at Candlestick Park, in a 38–19 win over the Minnesota Vikings, Jones caught a career-high eight receptions from quarterback Steve Young. The team finished the 1993 NFL season 10–6 and first in the NFC West. Jones started all 16 games for the third time in his career, finishing with a career-high 68 receptions for 735 yards and three touchdowns, and played in his second consecutive Pro Bowl. For the 1993–94 NFL playoffs, Jones made two starts, finishing with seven receptions for 65 receiving yards.

==== 1994 ====
On Sunday, November 6, at Robert F. Kennedy Memorial Stadium, in a 37–22 win over the Washington Redskins, Jones caught a career-long 69-yard pass from quarterback Steve Young to put the Niners up 10–0 in the first quarter. It was the longest reception for yards and longest receiving touchdown in Jones’ career in the regular season. The team finished the 1994 NFL season 13–3 and first in the NFC West. Jones started 15 games, finishing with 49 receptions for 670 receiving yards and a career-high nine receiving touchdowns. He was selected to play in his third consecutive Pro Bowl. On Sunday, January 29, 1995, at Joe Robbie Stadium, in a 49–26 win over the AFC Champion San Diego Chargers in Super Bowl XXIX, Jones won his third Super Bowl as a player, giving the 49ers their fifth in the last 14 seasons. He became the second tight end after Marv Fleming to win at least three Super Bowl championships and the first tight end in NFL history to win three titles without losing one. Jay Novacek would accomplish the feat the following year by winning his third without losing one and shortly after by Shannon Sharpe as well. Rob Gronkowski and Travis Kelce have since become the fifth and sixth tight ends to win at least three Super Bowls. For the 1994–95 NFL playoffs, Jones made three starts, finishing with a career-high ten receptions for 104 receiving yards and one receiving touchdown.

==== 1995 ====
The team finished the 1995 NFL season 11–5 and first in the NFC West. Jones started all 16 games, finishing with 60 receptions for 595 receiving yards and three receiving touchdowns. He was selected to play in his fourth consecutive Pro Bowl. On Saturday, January 6, 1996, at 3Com Park, Jones made the start against the Green Bay Packers and recorded playoff career-highs in a single game for the 1995–96 NFL playoffs with eight receptions and 112 receiving yards.

==== 1996 ====
The team finished the 1996 NFL season 12–4. Jones made 10 starts and appeared in 11 games, finishing with 33 receptions for 428 receiving yards and one receiving touchdown. For the 1996–97 NFL playoffs, Jones made two starts, finishing with six receptions for 54 receiving yards.

==== 1997 ====
The team finished the 1997 NFL season 13–3 and first in the NFC West under new head coach Steve Mariucci. On December 10, Jones announced on radio station KGO that he would retire at the end of the season. Jones made 12 starts and appeared in 13 games, finishing with 29 receptions for 383 receiving yards and two receiving touchdowns. On Monday, January 12, 1998, Jones appeared on the cover of Sports Illustrated. For the 1997–98 NFL playoffs, Jones made one start and appeared in two games, finishing with four receptions for 51 receiving yards.

== NFL career statistics ==
=== Regular season ===
Legend
	Won the Super Bowl
**Bold**	Career high
Underline	Incomplete data

Year	Team	Games		Receiving					Fumbles	
Year	Team	GP	GS	Rec	Yds	Avg	Long	TD	Fum	Lost
1987	SF	4	0	2	35	**17.5**	22	0	0	0
1988	SF	11	0	8	57	7.1	18	2	0	0
1989	SF	**16**	**16**	40	500	12.5	36	4	0	0
1990	SF	**16**	**16**	56	**747**	13.3	67	5	2	0
1991	SF	10	9	27	417	15.4	41	0	2	1
1992	SF	15	15	45	628	14.0	43	4	1	—
1993	SF	**16**	**16**	**68**	735	10.8	29	3	2	0
1994	SF	15	15	49	670	13.7	**69**	**9**	1	0
1995	SF	**16**	**16**	60	595	9.9	39	3	**3**	2
1996	SF	11	10	33	428	13.0	39	1	0	—
1997	SF	13	12	29	383	13.2	33	2	1	—
Career		143	125	417	5,195	12.5	69T	33	12	3

=== Playoffs ===
Year	Team	Games		Receiving					Fumbles	
Year	Team	GP	GS	Rec	Yds	Avg	Long	TD	Fum	Lost
1987	SF	1	1	1	7	7.0	7	0	0	—
1988	SF	**3**	2	2	17	8.5	11	0	0	—
1989	SF	**3**	**3**	8	77	9.6	20	**3**	**1**	—
1990	SF	2	2	7	**149**	**21.3**	**47**	0	0	—
1992	SF	2	2	7	104	14.9	22	1	0	—
1993	SF	2	2	7	65	9.3	13	0	0	—
1994	SF	**3**	**3**	**10**	104	10.4	33	1	**1**	—
1995	SF	1	1	8	112	14.0	29	0	0	—
1996	SF	2	2	6	54	9.0	13	0	0	—
1997	SF	2	1	4	51	12.8	16	0	0	—
Career		21	19	60	740	12.3	47T	5	2	—

=== NFL records ===
- 1,339 career combined regular season receptions by a wide receiver/tight end duo (1987–1997 – Jerry Rice)
- 19,153 career combined regular season receiving yards by a wide receiver/tight end duo (1987–1997 – Jerry Rice)
- 170 career combined regular season receiving touchdowns by a wide receiver/tight end duo (1987–1997 – Jerry Rice)

By a tight end:

- 1.000 NFL Championship / Super Bowl winning percentage (minimum 3 Super Bowls – tied with Jay Novacek and Shannon Sharpe)
- 1.000 NFL Championship / Super Bowl winning percentage with one team (minimum 3 Super Bowls – tied with Jay Novacek)
- First player to win 14 career playoff games
- First player to win 14 career playoff games with one team
- First player to play 21 career playoff games
- First player to play 21 career playoff games with one team
- First player to go 3–0 in Super Bowl career
- First player to go 3–0 in Super Bowl career with one team
- First player to start Super Bowl career 3–0
- First player to start Super Bowl career 3–0 with one team
- One of two players to win at least three NFL Championships / Super Bowls with one team without losing one (Jay Novacek)
- One of four players to win at least three NFL Championships / Super Bowls with one team (Jay Novacek, Rob Gronkowski, and Travis Kelce)
- One of three players to win at least three NFL Championships / Super Bowls without losing one (Jay Novacek and Shannon Sharpe)
- One of six players to win at least three NFL Championships / Super Bowls (Marv Fleming, Jay Novacek, Shannon Sharpe, Rob Gronkowski, and Travis Kelce)
- One of four players to win at least 14 career playoff games (Marv Fleming, Rob Gronkowski, and Travis Kelce)

=== San Francisco 49ers franchise records ===
By a tight end:

- Three NFL / Super Bowl championships
- Three NFL / Super Bowl appearances
- 110 career regular season wins
- 14 career playoff wins
- 0.769 regular season winning percentage
- 0.666 playoffs winning percentage
- 143 career regular season games played
- 19 career playoff games started
- 21 career playoff games played
- 60 career playoff receptions
- 740 career playoff receiving yards
- First player to make four career Pro Bowls

== Career highlights ==
=== Honors ===
Jones was inducted into the Division II Football Hall of Fame in 2001, the College Football Hall of Fame in 2002, and the Bay Area Sports Hall of Fame in 2013. On May 19, 2025, it was announced that Jones was elected as the 33rd member and the first tight end in franchise history that will be inducted into the San Francisco 49ers Hall of Fame. "It is truly the greatest honor of my life to be alongside the legends that comprise the San Francisco 49ers Hall of Fame, one of the greatest franchises in all of professional sports," Jones said after receiving the call from owner Jed York. On December 13 at Levi's Stadium, he was inducted and was honored the next day on December 14 at halftime during the 49ers 2025 NFL season Week 15 home game against the Tennessee Titans.

=== Awards ===
Award / Honor	Time(s)	Date(s)	Ref(s)
Super Bowl champion	3	XXIII, XXIV, XXIX	
Super Bowl	3	XXIII, XXIV, XXIX	
NFC champion	3	1988, 1989, 1994	
NFC Championship Game	7	1988–1990, 1992–1994, 1997	
NFL playoffs	10	1987–1990, 1992–1997	
All-Pro	3	1992–1994	
First-team All-Pro	1	1992	
Second-team All-Pro	2	1993–1994	
NEA First-team All-Pro	1	1992	
PFW First-team All-Pro	2	1993–1994	
UPI First-team All-Pro	2	1993–1994	
AP Second-team All-Pro	2	1993–1994	
NFC West Champion	9	1987–1990, 1992–1995, 1997	
Pro Bowl	4	1992–1995	
Bart Starr Award	1	1998	
Pro Football Reference Second-team All-Decade Team	1	1990s	
Kodak, Associated Press, Football News All-American	1	1985	
Western Football Conference Offensive Player of the Year (1985)	1	1985	
First-team All-WFC	2	1983–1985	
East-West Shrine Game All-Star	1	1985	
Division II Football Team of the Quarter Century	1	1975–2000	
Division II Football Hall of Fame	1	2001	
College Football Hall of Fame	1	2002	
San Francisco 49ers Hall of Fame	1	2025	
Bay Area Sports Hall of Fame	1	2013	
First-team All-BVAL	1	1981	

== Off the field ==
=== Personal life ===
Brent and Dana Jones met while attending Santa Clara University and were married in 1987. They have two daughters, Rachel and Courtney, who are both former NCAA Division I student athletes and played soccer. Rachel played for the Cal Poly Mustangs and Courtney played at the University of North Carolina at Chapel Hill, helping the Tar Heels win two consecutive NCAA Championships in her freshman and second years in 2008 and 2009. Courtney was drafted sixth overall by the Boston Breakers in the 2013 NWSL Supplemental Draft. She played professional soccer as a forward and defender for the new Breakers and FC Kansas City in the NWSL.

=== Broadcasting career ===
Shortly after his playing career ended, Jones became an analyst for The NFL Today on CBS in 1998. Jones worked as a color commentator for the NFL on CBS from 1999 to 2005 with Gus Johnson. Jones decided to leave CBS Sports during the 2005 NFL season to spend more time with family, and to focus on his business in California, Northgate Capital, which he founded with former teammates Mark Harris and Tommy Vardell.

=== Business ventures ===
In 2000, upon retiring from football, Jones and former teammates Steve Young, Tommy Vardell, and Mark Harris co-founded Northgate Capital, a venture capital and private equity investment firm with approximately $4.9 billion of assets under management and offices in San Francisco, Danville, Mexico City, and London and served as its managing director and founding partner. He sold a majority stake in Northgate to Indian financial services company Religare Enterprises in 2010 and continued to manage the firm as a partner. In 2016, after Religare and Northgate's management team sold the firm to The Capital Partnership, an investment advisor with offices in London and Dubai, he became an advisor. Jones is a former member of the board of directors for San Jose Sports & Entertainment Enterprises, which owns the San Jose Sharks of the National Hockey League.

=== Christianity ===
Jones is a Christian and found his faith when he attended Young Life as a sophomore in high school. His Young Life leader Tom Raley was instrumental in his life and told him that he would have a career in sports. Jones was one of the first players to start prayer circles in the NFL.

=== Coaching career ===
Jones's coaching career began in 2007 at Monte Vista High School, who compete in the East Bay Athletic League. Coaching the tight ends, he mentored Zach Ertz.

=== Politics ===
Jones is a Republican. In the past he has been rumored to be a potential political candidate. At one time, he was considered by many pundits to be a potential candidate for the US Congressional seat held by freshman Rep. Jerry McNerney in northern California's 11th congressional district. On March 19, 2009, the San Francisco Chronicle reported that Jones was being recruited to run in a special election to replace U.S. Representative Ellen Tauscher, who was appointed to a position in the State Department, in California's 10th congressional district. On March 4, 2010, David Harmer, a Republican candidate running for California's 11th congressional district, announced that Jones had endorsed Harmer's campaign.

== See also ==
- List of College Football Hall of Fame inductees (players, A–K)
