= Cullors =

Cullors is a surname. Notable people with the surname include:

- Derrick Cullors (born 1972), American football player
- Patrisse Cullors (born 1983), American artist and activist
