= 1997–98 NFL playoffs =

American football tournament

- Dates: December 27, 1997–January 25, 1998
- Season: 1997
- Teams: 12
- Games played: 11
- Super Bowl XXXII site: Qualcomm Stadium; San Diego, California
- Defending champions: Green Bay Packers
- Champion: Denver Broncos (1st title)
- Runner-up: Green Bay Packers
- Conference runners-up: Pittsburgh Steelers; San Francisco 49ers
NFL playoffs
← 1996–97	1998–99 →

The National Football League playoffs for the 1997 season began on December 27, 1997. The postseason tournament concluded with the Denver Broncos defeating the Green Bay Packers in Super Bowl XXXII, 31–24, on January 25, 1998, at Qualcomm Stadium in San Diego, California.

For the first time ever, all three Florida teams (the Jacksonville Jaguars, Miami Dolphins, and Tampa Bay Buccaneers) qualified for the playoffs. The feat would repeat itself in the 1999 postseason and again during the 2022 postseason.

== Participants ==
Within each conference, the three division winners and the three non-division winners with the best overall regular season records qualified for the playoffs. The three division winners were seeded 1–3 based on the overall won-lost-tied record, and the three wild card teams were seeded 4–6. The NFL did not use a fixed bracket playoff system, and there were no restrictions regarding teams from the same division matching up in any round. In the first round, dubbed the wild-card playoffs or wild-card weekend, the third-seeded division winner hosted the sixth seed wild card, and the fourth seed hosted the fifth. The 1 and 2 seeds from each conference received a first-round bye. In the second round, the divisional playoffs, the number 1 seed hosted the worst-remaining seed from the first round (seed 4, 5, or 6), while the number 2 seed played the other team (seed 3, 4, or 5). The two winning teams from each conference's divisional playoff games then meet in the respective AFC and NFC Conference Championship games, hosted by the higher seed. Although the Super Bowl, the championship round of the playoffs, was played at a neutral site, the designated home team was based on an annual rotation by conference.

Playoff seeds
Seed	AFC	NFC
1	Kansas City Chiefs (West winner)	San Francisco 49ers (West winner)
2	Pittsburgh Steelers (Central winner)	Green Bay Packers (Central winner)
3	New England Patriots (East winner)	New York Giants (East winner)
4	Denver Broncos (wild card)	Tampa Bay Buccaneers (wild card)
5	Jacksonville Jaguars (wild card)	Detroit Lions (wild card)
6	Miami Dolphins (wild card)	Minnesota Vikings (wild card)

== Bracket ==
Dec 28 – Houlihan's Stadium	Jan 4 – Lambeau Field
5	Detroit	10
4	Tampa Bay	7
4	Tampa Bay	20	Jan 11 – 3Com Park
2	Green Bay	21
NFC
Dec 27 – Giants Stadium	2	Green Bay	23
Jan 3 – 3Com Park
1	San Francisco	10
6	Minnesota	23	NFC Championship
6	Minnesota	22
3	NY Giants	22	Jan 25 – Qualcomm Stadium
1	San Francisco	38
Wild Card playoffs
Divisional playoffs
Dec 27 – Mile High Stadium	N2	Green Bay	24
Jan 4 – Arrowhead Stadium
A4	Denver	31
5	Jacksonville	17	Super Bowl XXXII
4	Denver	14
4	Denver	42	Jan 11 – Three Rivers Stadium
1	Kansas City	10
AFC
Dec 28 – Foxboro Stadium	4	Denver	24
Jan 3 – Three Rivers Stadium
2	Pittsburgh	21
6	Miami	3	AFC Championship
3	New England	6
3	New England	17
2	Pittsburgh	7

== Schedule ==
These playoffs marked the final season that NBC was the AFC network. CBS would then take over the rights to the AFC before the start of the following season. Super Bowl XXXII was also NBC's last NFL broadcast overall until 2006, when they signed on to televise Sunday Night Football.

ABC continued to broadcast the first two Wild Card playoff games, and Fox televised the rest of the NFC games.

Round	Away team	Score	Home team	Date	Kickoff (ET / UTC−5)	TV
Wild-card round	Minnesota Vikings	23–22	New York Giants	December 27, 1997	12:30 p.m.	ABC
Wild-card round	Jacksonville Jaguars	17–42	Denver Broncos	December 27, 1997	4:00 p.m.	ABC
Wild-card round	Miami Dolphins	3–17	New England Patriots	December 28, 1997	12:30 p.m.	NBC
Wild-card round	Detroit Lions	10–20	Tampa Bay Buccaneers	December 28, 1997	4:00 p.m.	Fox
Divisional round	New England Patriots	6–7	Pittsburgh Steelers	January 3, 1998	12:30 p.m.	NBC
Divisional round	Minnesota Vikings	22–38	San Francisco 49ers	January 3, 1998	4:00 p.m.	Fox
Divisional round	Green Bay Packers	21–7	Tampa Bay Buccaneers	January 4, 1998	12:30 p.m.	Fox
Divisional round	Denver Broncos	14–10	Kansas City Chiefs	January 4, 1998	4:00 p.m.	NBC
Conference championships	Denver Broncos	24–21	Pittsburgh Steelers	January 11, 1998	12:30 p.m.	NBC
Conference championships	Green Bay Packers	23–10	San Francisco 49ers	January 11, 1998	4:00 p.m.	Fox
Super Bowl XXXII Qualcomm Stadium San Diego, California	Denver Broncos	31–24	Green Bay Packers	January 25, 1998	6:25 p.m.	NBC

== Wild-card round ==
=== Saturday, December 27, 1997 ===
==== NFC: Minnesota Vikings 23, New York Giants 22 ====
Minnesota Vikings vs. New York Giants – Game summary

Quarter	1	2	3	4	Total
Vikings	0	3	7	13	23
Giants	6	13	0	3	22

at Giants Stadium, East Rutherford, New Jersey

- Game time: 12:30 p.m. EST
- Game weather: Snow and rain, 39 °F (4 °C)
- Game attendance: 77,497
- Referee: Ed Hochuli
- TV announcers (ABC): Mike Patrick (play-by-play) and Joe Theismann (color commentator)

Game information

First quarter

- NYG – Brad Daluiso 43-yard field goal. Giants 3–0.
- NYG – Brad Daluiso 22-yard field goal. Giants 6–0.

Second quarter

- NYG – Aaron Pierce 2-yard pass from Danny Kanell (Brad Daluiso kick). Giants 13–0.
- NYG – Brad Daluiso 41-yard field goal. Giants 16–0.
- MIN – Eddie Murray 26-yard field goal. Giants 16–3.
- NYG – Brad Daluiso 51-yard field goal. Giants 19–3.

Third quarter

- MIN – Leroy Hoard 4-yard run (Eddie Murray kick). Giants 19–10.

Fourth quarter

- MIN – Eddie Murray 26-yard field goal. Giants 19–13.
- NYG – Brad Daluiso 22-yard field goal. Giants 22–13.
- MIN – Jake Reed 30-yard pass from Randall Cunningham (Eddie Murray kick). Giants 22–20.
- MIN – Eddie Murray 24-yard field goal. Vikings 23–22.

Top passers

- MIN – Randall Cunningham – 15/36, 203 yards, TD, INT
- NYG – Danny Kanell – 16/32, 199 yards, TD

Top rushers

- MIN – Robert Smith – 16 rushes, 40 yards
- NYG – Tiki Barber – 17 rushes, 29 yards

Top receivers

- MIN – Jake Reed – 5 receptions, 89 yards, TD
- NYG – David Patten – 5 receptions, 86 yards

The 1997 playoffs were notable for featuring four teams from the NFC Central. At fourth place were the Vikings, who had started the year a promising 8–2 before losing five straight games and barely making the postseason with a 9–7 record. The Vikings had made the playoffs in four of the last five seasons, but had lost each time in the first round. This time, however, they managed to earn a win by scoring 10 points in the final 90 seconds of the game.

Vikings quarterback Randall Cunningham got off to a rough start as he lost three first half turnovers that would be converted into nine New York points. After each team punted to start the game, Cunningham lost a fumble that was recovered by defensive tackle Bernard Holsey on the Vikings 23. New York ended up losing yardage with their ensuing drive, but Brad Daluiso kicked a 43-yard field goal to put them up 3–0. Cunningham fumbled again on his next drive, and New York defensive end Michael Strahan recovered the ball on the Minnesota 46-yard line. Quarterback Danny Kanell subsequently completed a 27-yard pass to fullback Charles Way, setting up Daluiso's second field goal that made the score 6–0.

In the second quarter, New York increased their lead to 13–0 with a 7-play, 56-yard scoring drive. Kanell kept it going with an 11-yard pass to running back Tiki Barber on third and 4, and then hit David Patten for a 37-yard completion to the Vikings 2-yard line. Three plays later, he threw a 3-yard touchdown pass to tight end Aaron Pierce. After the teams traded punts, Giants cornerback Jason Sehorn intercepted a pass from Cunningham and returned it 36 yards to the Vikings 47-yard line. New York then drove 23 yards to a 41-yard field goal from Daluiso, making the score 16–0. The Vikings punted on their next drive but caught a break when cornerback Duane Butler recovered a fumble from Giants receiver Amani Toomer on the punt return on the New York 27-yard line. Cunningham's 19-yard completion to Cris Carter moved the ball to the 7, leading to Eddie Murray's 26-yard field goal. However, his ensuing kickoff went out of bounds, giving the ball to New York on their 40. Taking advantage of their excellent field position, the Giants put together a 26-yard drive to score on Daluiso's 51-yard field goal giving New York a 19–3 lead. The Giants defense held the Vikings offense to 21 rushing yards and Cunningham completed only five of 16 passes for 46 yards.

Early in the third quarter, Vikings defensive end Jerry Ball recovered a fumble from Barber on the Giants 5-yard line, setting up Leroy Hoard's 5-yard touchdown run on the ensuing play that narrowed the gap to 19–10. Then after a punt, Minnesota's offense got on track, moving the ball into New York territory with Cunningham's 33-yard completion to Jake Reed. However, Murray missed a 48-yard field goal attempt. Still their defense managed to force a punt, and Brad Maynard's 15-yard kick gave Minnesota a first down on their own 40. This time they managed to drive 52 yards and score with Murray's 26-yard field goal, making the score 19–13 early in the fourth quarter.

New York's offense came back to life in the final quarter, as Kanell completed six passes on a 13-play, 74-yard drive, including an 18-yarder to Patten on third and 9, and a 21-yard completion to Chris Calloway. The Vikings defense halted the possession on their own 5, but Daluiso kicked his fifth field goal of the day from there, giving the Giants a 22–13 lead with 7:03 left in regulation. The Vikings got the ball back and ran seven plays, but could not get into scoring range and ultimately decided to punt facing a two-score deficit with 3:51 left.

"If we were home, we would have been booed all over the place, because people don't understand the game", Vikings coach Dennis Green said after the game. What persuaded Green to punt and keep playing defense was how well his maligned run defenders were stopping New York's running attack. But Green admitted he was cutting it close. "We had to get the onside kick", he said. "We practice it every day. Luck is when preparation meets opportunity."

Green's decision paid off as the Vikings forced a punt with 2:13 left, and got the ball on the Giants 49-yard line due to another short Maynard kick. Soon after, they scored on Cunningham's 30-yard touchdown pass to Reed with 1:30 left. Murray then attempted an onside kick, which bounced off Calloway's chest and was recovered by Vikings receiver Chris Walsh on the Minnesota 39. A false start penalty and an incompletion left the Vikings facing second and 15 from the 34, but Cunningham subsequently completed passes to Andrew Glover and Carter for gains of 5 and 24 yards. Following a 14-yard pass interference penalty on cornerback Phillippi Sparks, Robert Smith ran for a 16-yard gain to set up Murray's go-ahead 24-yard field goal with 0:10 remaining in the game.

This game was the biggest comeback win by a road team in the playoffs since 1972, and the first postseason win for the Vikings in nine years. It was also the first playoff win of Green's career, following four first-round playoff losses over the last five years.

This was the second postseason meeting between the Vikings and Giants. New York won the only prior meeting.

Previous playoff games
New York leads 1–0 in all-time playoff games

1993

Minnesota Vikings 10 @ New York Giants 17

1993 NFC Wild Card playoffs

==== AFC: Denver Broncos 42, Jacksonville Jaguars 17 ====
Jacksonville Jaguars vs. Denver Broncos – Game summary

Quarter	1	2	3	4	Total
Jaguars	0	7	10	0	17
Broncos	14	7	0	21	42

at Mile High Stadium, Denver, Colorado

- Game time: 4:00 p.m. EST/2:00 p.m. MST
- Game weather: 42 °F (6 °C), clear
- Game attendance: 74,481
- Referee: Bernie Kukar
- TV announcers (ABC): Al Michaels (play-by-play), Frank Gifford, and Dan Dierdorf (color commentators)
- Recap, Game Book

Game information

First quarter

- DEN – Terrell Davis 2-yard run (Jason Elam kick). Broncos 7–0.
- DEN – Rod Smith 43-yard pass from John Elway (Jason Elam kick). Broncos 14–0.

Second quarter

- DEN – Terrell Davis 5-yard run (Jason Elam kick). Broncos 21–0.
- JAX – Natrone Means 2-yard run (Mike Hollis kick). Broncos 21–7.

Third quarter

- JAX – Mike Hollis 38-yard field goal. Broncos 21–10.
- JAX – Travis Davis 29-yard blocked punt return (Mike Hollis kick). Broncos 21–17.

Fourth quarter

- DEN – Derek Loville 25-yard run (Jason Elam kick). Broncos 28–17.
- DEN – Derek Loville 8-yard run (Jason Elam kick). Broncos 35–17.
- DEN – Vaughn Hebron 6-yard run (Jason Elam kick). Broncos 42–17.

Top passers

- JAX – Mark Brunell – 18/32, 203 yards, INT
- DEN – John Elway – 16/24, 223 yards, TD

Top rushers

- JAX – Natrone Means – 10 rushes, 40 yards
- DEN – Terrell Davis – 31 rushes, 184 yards, 2 TD

Top receivers

- JAX – Keenan McCardell – 6 receptions, 55 yards
- DEN – Rod Smith – 3 receptions, 99 yards, TD

Denver compiled 310 rushing yards and 511 total yards of offense, and held the ball for 40:59 in a 42–17 win, avenging their playoff loss to the Jaguars the year before. The Broncos dominated early, converting their first nine third downs and scoring touchdowns on their first three drives. First, they converted four third downs as they drove 72 yards in 7:21, featuring a 25-yard reception by Ed McCaffrey on third and 15, and scored on a 2-yard touchdown run by Terrell Davis. Jacksonville was forced to a three-and-out on their next drive, and Bryan Barker's punt went just 24 yards to the Denver 40-yard line. The Broncos then drove 60 yards and increased their lead to 14–0 with a 43-yard touchdown pass from John Elway to Rod Smith on third down and 4 with 2:37 left in the first quarter. Reggie Barlow returned the ensuing kickoff 37 yards to midfield, and Jacksonville subsequently drove to the Denver 40, but were stopped there and had to punt. Barker's kick pinned the Broncos back at their own 8, but they still drove 92 yards to make the score 21–0 on Davis' 5-yard touchdown run. The key play of the drive was a 40-yard completion from Elway to Smith on third down and 6 from their own 12-yard line. Later in the drive, Elway completed a 16-yard pass to Smith on third down and 13 from the Jags 26. By this point, Elway had completed all six of his passes for 156 yards on third down plays.

Jacksonville responded by driving 79 yards, aided by a 16-yard reception from Jimmy Smith and a 34-yard pass interference penalty on safety Darrien Gordon, to score on a 2-yard touchdown run from Natrone Means, cutting the score to 21–7 with just over five minutes left in the second quarter. This would be the final score of the first half as the next three drives would end in punts.

Barlow returned the second half kickoff 58 yards to the Broncos 27, setting up Jags kicker Mike Hollis' 38-yard field goal that cut the score to 21–10. Four minutes later, safety Travis Davis blocked a punt from Denver's Tom Rouen and returned it 29 yards for a touchdown, bringing Jacksonville to within 21–17. Despite a 51-yard kickoff return by Vaughn Hebron, things seemed to look even better for Jacksonville on the ensuing possession when safety Chris Hudson forced a fumble from Elway that was recovered by defensive end Renaldo Wynn. Jacksonville quarterback Mark Brunell's subsequent 37-yard completion to tight end Damon Jones gave them a first down on the Broncos 16-yard line. But on the next play, Brunell lost a fumble of his own that was recovered by linebacker Allen Aldridge. Denver then drove to the Jacksonville 15, featuring a 59-yard run by Davis, but Elway lost another fumble that was recovered by cornerback Dave Thomas and the score remained 21–17 going into the fourth quarter.

In the final quarter, Denver took over the game. Jacksonville was forced to punt after Elway's second fumble, and Barker's 27-yard kick gave Denver a first down on the Jacksonville 48. From there it took just two plays to score, a 23-yard completion from Elway to tight end Shannon Sharpe and a 25-yard touchdown run by Derek Loville, making the score 28–17. The Jaguars made one last spirited comeback attempt, but Gordon put an end to it by intercepting a pass from Brunell in the end zone. Denver then drove 80 yards in 10 plays, eight of them carries by Loville (including a 44-yard run), who was now starting in place of the injured Davis. On the last play, his 8-yard touchdown run gave Denver a 35–17 lead. Now in a desperate situation, Brunell attempted to convert a fourth and 10 on the Jaguars next drive, but Gordon sacked him for a 10-yard loss, while a 15-yard unnecessary roughness penalty on receiver Keenan McCardell gave the Broncos a first down on the Jacksonville 15-yard line. A few plays later, Hebron finished off the scoring on a 6-yard touchdown run with 1:16 left in the game.

Davis rushed for 184 yards and two touchdowns, while also catching four passes for 11 yards. Loville, who rushed for only 124 yards during the regular season, had 103 yards and two touchdowns on just 11 carries and a 10-yard reception. Elway completed 16 of 24 passes for 223 yards and a touchdown. Rod Smith was the top receiver of the game with three receptions for 99 yards and a touchdown. Hebron had six carries for 23 yards and a touchdown, along with three kickoff returns for 87 yards. Barlow returned three kickoffs for 118 yards and a punt for five yards. Jags defensive end Clyde Simmons had two sacks.

This was the second postseason meeting between the Jaguars and Broncos. Jacksonville won the only prior meeting the year prior.

Previous playoff games
Jacksonville leads 1–0 in all-time playoff games

1996

Jacksonville Jaguars 30 @ Denver Broncos 27

1996 AFC Divisional playoffs

=== Sunday, December 28, 1997 ===
==== AFC: New England Patriots 17, Miami Dolphins 3 ====
Miami Dolphins vs. New England Patriots – Game summary

Quarter	1	2	3	4	Total
Dolphins	0	0	0	3	3
Patriots	0	7	10	0	17

at Foxboro Stadium, Foxborough, Massachusetts

- Game time: 12:30 p.m. EST
- Game weather: 32 °F (0 °C), clear
- Game attendance: 60,041
- Referee: Gerald Austin
- TV announcers (NBC): Dick Enberg (play-by-play), Phil Simms, and Paul Maguire (color commentators)

Game information

First quarter

- No scoring plays

Second quarter

- NE – Troy Brown 24-yard pass from Drew Bledsoe (Adam Vinatieri kick). Patriots 7–0.

Third quarter

- NE – Todd Collins 40-yard interception return (Adam Vinatieri kick). Patriots 14–0.
- NE – Adam Vinatieri 22-yard field goal. Patriots 17–0.

Fourth quarter

- MIA – Olindo Mare 38-yard field goal. Patriots 17–3.

Top passers

- MIA – Dan Marino – 17/43, 141 yards, 2 INT
- NE – Drew Bledsoe – 16/32, 139 yards, TD

Top rushers

- MIA – Bernie Parmalee – 9 rushes, 22 yards
- NE – Derrick Cullors – 22 rushes, 86 yards

Top receivers

- MIA – Lamar Thomas – 3 receptions, 62 yards
- NE – Terry Glenn – 4 receptions, 57 yards

New England had narrowly defeated the Dolphins 14–12 in a tough defensive struggle during the last Monday night game of the regular season, and this playoff game would have similar results. The Patriots' defense held Miami to 162 total yards of offense, 42 rushing yards and forced three Dolphins turnovers. Dolphins quarterback Dan Marino completed only 17 of 43 passes for 141 yards and was intercepted twice. He also fumbled the ball twice, losing a turnover on one of them. This was the first time in Marino's 15-year career (including 14 postseason games) that he did not throw a touchdown pass in a playoff game. Without star running back Curtis Martin, New England could only generate 228 offensive yards, but their ball security turned out to be key as they avoided losing any turnovers for the entire game.

The first quarter was scoreless. Near the end of it, Miami threatened to score with a drive to the Patriots 39, but lost the ball when Karim Abdul-Jabbar was tackled by Todd Collins and Lawyer Milloy for no gain on fourth and 1. New England then drove to the Dolphins 31-yard line, but also failed to score when Adam Vinatieri missed a 48-yard field goal attempt.

A few plays later, Marino threw his first interception, which was returned 22 yards to the Dolphins 29-yard line by New England linebacker Chris Slade off a pass deflected by safety Larry Whigham, setting up quarterback Drew Bledsoe's 24-yard touchdown pass to receiver Troy Brown. New England would go into halftime with a 7–0 lead, as the only other scoring opportunity of the half would be a Pats drive to the Miami 30 that ended with another missed field goal attempt from Vinatieri.

On the second play of the third quarter, Collins returned Marino's other interception 40 yards for a touchdown, making him the first Patriot to ever score on a postseason interception return. After a punt, New England mounted the first long sustained scoring drive of the game, moving the ball 67 yards in 15 plays. Running back Derrick Cullors carried the ball seven times for 42 yards on the drive, while Bledsoe added a 20-yard completion to Terry Glenn and Vinatieri finished it off with a 22-yard field goal with 1:58 left in the third quarter.

Aided by a 40-yard kickoff return by Corey Harris and a 10-yard late hit penalty against Vinatieri at the end of it, Miami finally managed to score on their following drive, moving the ball 23 yards to the Patriots 20-yard line where Olindo Mare made a 38-yard field goal on the second play of the fourth quarter. After Mare's field goal, Miami recovered an onside kick, but cornerback Chris Canty forced a fumble while sacking Marino, and Slade recovered the ball. Miami's final three drives of the game would result in a punt and two turnovers on downs.

Cullors, who only rushed for 102 yards during the season, was the sole offensive star of the game, with 86 yards on 22 carries and a kick return for 17 yards.

This was the third postseason meeting between the Dolphins and Patriots. Both teams split the prior two meetings.

Previous playoff games
Tied 1–1 in all-time playoff games

1982

New England Patriots 13 @ Miami Dolphins 28

1982 AFC first round playoffs

1985

New England Patriots 31 @ Miami Dolphins 14

1985 AFC Championship Game

==== NFC: Tampa Bay Buccaneers 20, Detroit Lions 10 ====
Detroit Lions vs. Tampa Bay Buccaneers – Game summary

Quarter	1	2	3	4	Total
Lions	0	0	3	7	10
Buccaneers	3	10	7	0	20

at Houlihan's Stadium, Tampa, Florida

- Game time: 4:00 p.m. EST
- Game weather: 57 °F (14 °C), partly cloudy
- Game attendance: 73,361
- Referee: Mike Carey
- TV announcers (Fox): Pat Summerall (play-by-play) and John Madden (color commentator)

Game information

First quarter

- TB – Michael Husted 22-yard field goal. Buccaneers 3–0.

Second quarter

- TB – Horace Copeland 9-yard pass from Trent Dilfer (Michael Husted kick). Buccaneers 10–0.
- TB – Michael Husted 42-yard field goal. Buccaneers 13–0.

Third quarter

- TB – Mike Alstott 31-yard run (Michael Husted kick). Buccaneers 20–0.
- DET – Jason Hanson 33-yard field goal. Buccaneers 20–3.

Fourth quarter

- DET – Tommy Vardell 1-yard run (Jason Hanson kick). Buccaneers 20–10.

Top passers

- DET – Frank Reich – 11/15, 129 yards
- TB – Trent Dilfer – 13/26, 181 yards, TD, INT

Top rushers

- DET – Barry Sanders – 18 rushes, 65 yards
- TB – Warrick Dunn – 18 rushes, 72 yards

Top receivers

- DET – Johnnie Morton – 8 receptions, 88 yards
- TB – Robb Thomas – 2 receptions, 66 yards

The Buccaneers won their first playoff game since 1979, in what turned out to be their final game at Houlihan's Stadium. Tampa Bay built a 20–0 lead midway through the third quarter. Lions quarterback Scott Mitchell completed only 10 of 25 passes for 78 yards, and running back Barry Sanders, who rushed for over 2,000 yards during the season, had 18 carries for just 65 yards.

Bucs quarterback Trent Dilfer's 23-yard completion to Karl Williams on third down and 1 set up the first score of the game, Michael Husted's 22-yard field goal with 5:25 left in the first quarter. The Lions received a huge scoring opportunity when Williams fumbled a punt at the end of the next drive. Lions linebacker Matt Russell got to the ball first, but instead of falling on the ball, he tried to pick it up and run with it. Instead of grabbing the ball, he accidentally batted it out of bounds, allowing the Bucs to keep possession on the Lions 11-yard line. Taking full advantage of their second chance, Tampa Bay subsequently drove 89 yards in 17 plays, taking 8:50 off the clock and converting three third downs, one from a 12-men on the field penalty against Detroit. Dilfer finished the drive with a 9-yard touchdown pass to Horace Copeland that put the team up 10–0. Later on, Buccaneers cornerback Anthony Parker intercepted a pass from Mitchell and returned it 19 yards to the Lions 20-yard line, setting up Husted's 43-yard field goal that gave the team a 13–0 lead at the end of the half. Tampa Bay had a chance to increase their lead even more before halftime with a drive to the Lions 43, but Ron Rice intercepted a pass from Dilfer on the last play of the second quarter.

Detroit had to punt on their opening drive of the third quarter, and John Jett's 31-yard kick gave Tampa Bay great field position on their own 47-yard line. Five plays later, Bucs fullback Mike Alstott scored on a 31-yard touchdown run (the longest run in franchise playoff history) to make the score 20–0. Detroit responded with their best drive of the day, moving the ball 73 yards to the Tampa Bay 8-yard line. But it ended with no points when Mitchell threw an incomplete pass on fourth down and 3.

Detroit finally managed to put some points on the board the next time they got the ball, driving 46 yards in nine plays. The key play was a 17-yard run by Ron Rivers on fourth and 4 from the Lions 45. After reaching the Buccaneers 17, Mitchell suffered a concussion on a 2-yard run and was replaced by Frank Reich. On the next play after the injury, Jason Hanson kicked a 33-yard field goal, cutting the score to 20–3. Then after a Bucs punt, Reich completed all five of his pass attempts for 71 yards (3 of them to Johnnie Morton for 45) on the way to Tommy Vardell's 1-yard touchdown run, and the lead was trimmed to 20–10. The Lions seemed primed to make a serious comeback attempt when they forced Tampa Bay into a third and 5 situation on their own 10-yard line, but Dilfer's 50-yard completion to Robb Thomas moved the ball to the Lions 36. The Bucs were unable to score, but Sean Landeta's punt pinned the Lions back at their own 4-yard line with 3:20 left in the game. Then after completing a 14-yard pass on third and 15 during their final drive, Reich accidentally spiked the ball on fourth down, giving the ball to Tampa Bay.

In the defensive struggle, both teams combined for only 623 yards (316 for Tampa Bay, 307 for Detroit). Bucs running back Warrick Dunn was the leading rusher of the game with 72 yards, while Alstott had 68 yards and a touchdown, along with a reception for 12 yards. Morton was the Lions leading receiver of the game with seven receptions for 69 yards.

This was the first postseason meeting between the Lions and Buccaneers.

== Divisional round ==
=== Saturday, January 3, 1998 ===
==== AFC: Pittsburgh Steelers 7, New England Patriots 6 ====
New England Patriots vs. Pittsburgh Steelers – Game summary

Quarter	1	2	3	4	Total
Patriots	0	3	0	3	6
Steelers	7	0	0	0	7

at Three Rivers Stadium, Pittsburgh, Pennsylvania

- Game time: 12:30 p.m. EST
- Game weather: 55 °F (13 °C), cloudy
- Game attendance: 61,228
- Referee: Walt Coleman
- TV announcers (NBC): Tom Hammond (play-by-play) and Randy Cross (color commentator)

Game information

First quarter

- PIT – Kordell Stewart 40-yard run (Norm Johnson kick). Steelers 7–0.

Second quarter

- NE – Adam Vinatieri 31-yard field goal. Steelers 7–3.

Third quarter

- No scoring plays

Fourth quarter

- NE – Adam Vinatieri 46-yard field goal. Steelers 7–6.

Top passers

- NE – Drew Bledsoe – 23/44, 264 yards, 2 INT
- PIT – Kordell Stewart – 14/31, 134 yards, INT

Top rushers

- NE – Sedrick Shaw – 10 rushes, 22 yards
- PIT – Kordell Stewart – 11 rushes, 68 yards, TD

Top receivers

- NE – Shawn Jefferson – 9 receptions, 104 yards
- PIT – Yancey Thigpen – 3 receptions, 54 yards

Quarterback Kordell Stewart's 40-yard touchdown run in the first quarter was the difference in a defense-dominated game.

The Patriots were severely depleted by injuries, playing without star running back Curtis Martin. Pro Bowl tight end Ben Coates was limited to just a few plays, while receiver Terry Glenn was out of the game a few minutes into the fourth quarter. On the third play of the game, rookie safety Chad Scott intercepted a pass from New England quarterback Drew Bledsoe and returned it 27 yards to the Steelers 38. Stewart then got the team to the Patriots 40-yard line, converting two third downs with 10-yard completions to Charles Johnson before taking the ball the rest of the way to the end zone on a 40-yard score, the longest touchdown run in Steelers playoff history at the time.

In the second quarter, Bledsoe completed two passes to Shawn Jefferson for 29 yards and a 36-yard throw to Glenn on a 65-yard drive that ended with Adam Vinatieri's 31-yard field goal, making the score 7–3. Later on, Pittsburgh drove to the New England 33-yard line, but cornerback Steve Israel intercepted a pass from Stewart. The only remaining highlight of the quarter would be Steelers receiver Will Blackwell's 58-yard punt return on the last play of the half.

On the last play of the third quarter, Bledsoe's 39-yard completion to Glenn led to a 46-yard field goal from Vinatieri, cutting their deficit to 7–6. After a punt from each team, the Steelers had a chance to put the game away with a drive to the Patriots 1-yard line. On fourth down, coach Bill Cowher tried to ice the game with a conversion attempt, but Stewart was stuffed for no gain with 3:24 left in regulation. This gave New England one last chance to drive for a winning field goal and they managed to reach their own 42, but rookie linebacker Mike Vrabel stripped the ball from Bledsoe, and fellow linebacker Jason Gildon recovered it. The Patriots managed to get it back with 34 seconds left, but linebacker Levon Kirkland intercepted Bledsoe's Hail Mary pass on the game's final play.

For the third time in four years, Pittsburgh would play and host the AFC Championship Game. Jefferson was the sole offensive star of the game with nine receptions for 106 yards. Jerome Bettis led the Steelers with 74 yards from scrimmage but was held in check by New England's defense. Blackwell had four punt returns for 78 yards and three kickoff returns for 36. Gildon had a sack and two fumble recoveries.

This was the second postseason meeting between the Patriots and Steelers. New England won the only previous meeting.

Previous playoff games
New England leads 1–0 in all-time playoff games

1996

Pittsburgh Steelers 3 @ New England Patriots 28

1996 AFC Divisional playoffs

==== NFC: San Francisco 49ers 38, Minnesota Vikings 22 ====
Minnesota Vikings vs. San Francisco 49ers – Game summary

Quarter	1	2	3	4	Total
Vikings	7	0	7	8	22
49ers	7	14	10	7	38

at 3Com Park, San Francisco, California

- Game time: 4:00 p.m. EST/1:00 p.m. PST
- Game weather: 57 °F (14 °C), partly cloudy
- Game attendance: 65,018
- Referee: Bob McElwee
- TV announcers (Fox): Dick Stockton (play-by-play) and Matt Millen (color commentator)

Game information

First quarter

- SF – William Floyd 1-yard run (Gary Anderson kick). 49ers 7–0.
- MIN – Cris Carter 66-yard pass from Randall Cunningham (Eddie Murray kick). Tie 7–7.

Second quarter

- SF – Terry Kirby 1-yard run (Gary Anderson kick). 49ers 14–7.
- SF – Ken Norton Jr. 23-yard interception return (Gary Anderson kick). 49ers 21–7.

Third quarter

- SF – Gary Anderson 34-yard field goal. 49ers 24–7.
- MIN – Cris Carter 3-yard pass from Randall Cunningham (Eddie Murray kick). 49ers 24–14.
- SF – Terrell Owens 15-yard pass from Steve Young (Gary Anderson kick). 49ers 31–14.

Fourth quarter

- SF – Terry Kirby 1-yard run (Gary Anderson kick). 49ers 38–14.
- MIN – Matthew Hatchette 13-yard pass from Randall Cunningham (Chris Walsh pass from Randall Cunningham). 49ers 38–22.

Top passers

- MIN – Randall Cunningham – 18/40, 331 yards, 3 TD, INT
- SF – Steve Young – 21/30, 224 yards, TD

Top rushers

- MIN – Robert Smith – 8 rushes, 33 yards
- SF – Terry Kirby – 25 rushes, 120 yards, 2 TD

Top receivers

- MIN – Jake Reed – 5 receptions, 114 yards
- SF – J. J. Stokes – 9 receptions, 101 yards

Minnesota came into the playoffs with the second-to-last ranked defense during the regular season, something the 49ers proved more than capable of exploiting. By the end of the game, San Francisco racked up 394 yards without losing a single turnover and only giving up one sack. Filling in for the injured starter Garrison Hearst, 49ers running back Terry Kirby ran for a career-high 120 yards and two touchdowns, while receiver J. J. Stokes caught a career-high nine passes for 101 yards. Steve Young threw for 220 yards and a touchdown, while also rushing for 37. Minnesota had 374 yards, but lost 91 of them with 12 penalties. Vikings quarterback Randall Cunningham threw for 331 yards and three touchdowns, but also threw an interception that was returned for a touchdown. His top target was Jake Reed, who caught five passes for 114 yards. Cris Carter added six receptions for 93 yards and two touchdowns.

Early in the first quarter, Vikings punter Mitch Berger shanked a 12-yard punt that gave the 49ers a first down on the Minnesota 26-yard line, leading to fullback William Floyd's 1-yard touchdown run. It was the start of a long day for Berger, who finished the game with a measly 29.9 yards per punt average on his seven kicks. Still, the Vikings responded on their first play after the ensuing kickoff with Cunningham's 66-yard touchdown pass to Carter. Late in the second quarter, a 28-yard pass interference penalty on Vikings safety Torrian Gray and a personal foul call against linebacker Dwayne Rudd for kicking the penalty flag gave the 49ers a first down on the Minnesota 2-yard line. On the next play, a penalty against linebacker Dixon Edwards put the ball on the 1, and Kirby ran the ball into the end zone from there, giving the 49ers a 14–7 lead at the end of a 61-yard drive. Then on the Vikings ensuing drive, linebacker Ken Norton Jr. intercepted a pass from Cunningham and returned it 23 yards for a touchdown, making the score 21–7 going into halftime.

San Francisco increased their lead to 24–7 early in the third quarter, driving 46 yards in 10 plays to score with Gary Anderson's 34-yard field goal. But the Vikings responded with Cunningham's 53-yard completion to Reed setting up a 3-yard touchdown reception by Carter, narrowing the gap to 24–14. Replays showed the officials blew the call on Reed's reception because his second toe came down on the end line, but it didn't make much difference because the 49ers came back with a 75-yard touchdown drive with Kirby rushing for gains of 22 and 14 yards on the first two plays. Young's 15-yard pass to Terrell Owens made the score 31–14.

In the fourth quarter, a 15-yard penalty against Vikings defensive tackle John Randle and a 29-yard completion from Young to Stokes set up Kirby's second touchdown of the day to put the Niners up 38–14 before Cunningham led a desperate comeback attempt. After finishing a 73-yard drive with a 13-yard touchdown pass to Matthew Hatchette that cut the score to 38–22, he led the team to the 49ers 16-yard line with about two minutes left in the game. But after spiking the ball on first down, he threw three consecutive incompletions, resulting in a turnover on downs that allowed San Francisco to run out the rest of the clock.

This was the fifth postseason meeting between the Vikings and 49ers. San Francisco won three of the prior four meetings.

Previous playoff games
San Francisco leads 3–1 in all-time playoff games

1970

San Francisco 49ers 17 @ Minnesota Vikings 14

1970 NFC Divisional playoffs

1987

Minnesota Vikings 36 @ San Francisco 49ers 24

1987 NFC Divisional playoffs

1988

Minnesota Vikings 9 @ San Francisco 49ers 34

1988 NFC Divisional playoffs

1989

Minnesota Vikings 13 @ San Francisco 49ers 41

1989 NFC Divisional playoffs

=== Sunday, January 4, 1998 ===
==== NFC: Green Bay Packers 21, Tampa Bay Buccaneers 7 ====
Tampa Bay Buccaneers vs. Green Bay Packers – Game summary

Quarter	1	2	3	4	Total
Buccaneers	0	0	7	0	7
Packers	7	6	0	8	21

at Lambeau Field, Green Bay, Wisconsin

- Game time: 12:30 p.m. EST/11:30 a.m. CST
- Game weather: 32 °F (0 °C), cloudy
- Game attendance: 60,327
- Referee: Johnny Grier
- TV announcers (Fox): Pat Summerall (play-by-play) and John Madden (color commentator)

Game information

First quarter

- GB – Mark Chmura 3-yard pass from Brett Favre (Ryan Longwell kick). Packers 7–0.
- GB – Ryan Longwell 21-yard field goal. Packers 10–0.

Second quarter

- GB – Ryan Longwell 32-yard field goal. Packers 13–0.

Third quarter

- TB – Mike Alstott 6-yard run (Michael Husted kick). Packers 13–7.

Fourth quarter

- GB – Dorsey Levens 2-yard run (Brett Favre run). Packers 21–7.

Top passers

- TB – Trent Dilfer – 11/36, 200 yards, 2 INT
- GB – Brett Favre – 15/28, 190 yards, TD, 2 INT

Top rushers

- TB – Warrick Dunn – 8 rushes, 64 yards
- GB – Dorsey Levens – 25 rushes, 112 yards, TD

Top receivers

- TB – Dave Moore – 3 receptions, 54 yards
- GB – Antonio Freeman – 7 receptions, 75 yards

Packers running back Dorsey Levens rushed for a team playoff record 112 yards and a touchdown while also catching four passes for 29 yards as the Green Bay defense held Tampa Bay to 90 rushing yards and intercepted two passes from Trent Dilfer, who completed only 11 of 36 passes for 200 yards.

Early in the game, Tampa Bay sent their field goal unit onto the field three times, but failed to get any points each time. After the game started with a punt from each team, the Bucs drove to the Green Bay 25-yard line, but Packers defensive tackle Bob Kuberski blocked Michael Husted's 43-yard field goal attempt. Green Bay then drove 67 yards, including a 26-yard catch by Antonio Freeman, to score on Brett Favre's 3-yard touchdown pass to tight end Mark Chmura. Tampa Bay responded with a drive to the Packers 25-yard line, but came up empty again. On fourth and 2 they attempted a fake field goal with a pass by Steve Walsh, but tight end John Davis was tackled by Keith McKenzie at the line of scrimmage for no gain.

Early in the second quarter, Tampa Bay got another scoring chance when Warren Sapp forced and recovered a fumble from Levens on the Green Bay 30-yard line. The Bucs then moved the ball to the 12, only to come up empty again when Walsh fumbled a bad snap on their field goal attempt. Later on, Packers receiver Robert Brooks' 28-yard punt return and 21-yard reception set up a field goal by Ryan Longwell. Then on the first play of the Bucs ensuing drive, Tyrone Williams intercepted a pass from Dilfer and returned it 14 yards, setting up Longwell's second field goal with six seconds left in the half, making the score 13–0.

Green Bay receiver Antonio Freeman returned the second half kickoff 90 yards for a touchdown, but a holding penalty on Darren Sharper eliminated the score and moved the ball all the way back to their own 11-yard line. Green Bay still managed to drive into scoring range, but on the eighth play of the drive, Bucs cornerback Donnie Abraham intercepted a pass from Favre on the Tampa Bay 6-yard line. Dilfer subsequently led the Bucs offense 94 yards in eight plays, completing a 54-yard pass to Reidel Anthony and a 28-yard pass to Dave Moore along the way, to score on fullback Mike Alstott's 6-yard touchdown run, cutting the score to 13–7. But two possessions later, Brooks' 14-yard punt return gave the Packers the ball on their 46-yard line, where they proceeded to drive 54 yards and score with a 2-yard touchdown run by Levens. Then, Favre closed out the scoring by running in the two-point conversion on a quarterback draw. Tampa Bay's final three possessions would result in two turnovers on downs and an interception by Packers safetyMike Prior.

Favre had a rough day, completing only 15 of 28 passes for 190 yards and a touchdown with two interceptions. Anthony finished the game with 141 all-purpose yards (one reception for 52 yards, four kick returns for 68 yards, and one punt return for 21 yards).

This was the first postseason meeting between the Buccaneers and Packers.

==== AFC: Denver Broncos 14, Kansas City Chiefs 10 ====
Denver Broncos vs. Kansas City Chiefs – Game summary

Quarter	1	2	3	4	Total
Broncos	0	7	0	7	14
Chiefs	0	0	10	0	10

at Arrowhead Stadium, Kansas City, Missouri

- Game time: 4:00 p.m. EST/3:00 p.m. CST
- Game weather: 32 °F (0 °C), light fog
- Game attendance: 76,965
- Referee: Jerry Markbreit
- TV announcers (NBC): Dick Enberg (play-by-play), Phil Simms, and Paul Maguire (color commentators)
- Recap, Game Book

Game information

First quarter

- No scoring plays

Second quarter

- DEN – Terrell Davis 1-yard run (Jason Elam kick). Broncos 7–0.

Third quarter

- KC – Pete Stoyanovich 20-yard field goal. Broncos 7–3.
- KC – Tony Gonzalez 12-yard pass from Elvis Grbac (Pete Stoyanovich kick). Chiefs 10–7.

Fourth quarter

- DEN – Terrell Davis 1-yard run (Jason Elam kick). Broncos 14–10.

Top passers

- DEN – John Elway – 10/19, 170 yards
- KC – Elvis Grbac – 24/37, 160 yards, TD

Top rushers

- DEN – Terrell Davis – 25 rushes, 101 yards, 2 TD
- KC – Marcus Allen – 12 rushes, 37 yards

Top receivers

- DEN – Ed McCaffrey – 3 receptions, 56 yards
- KC – Andre Rison – 8 receptions, 110 yards

For the third consecutive year the AFC's No. 1 seed fell in the divisional playoffs. One week after avenging the previous year's playoff loss against Jacksonville, the Broncos avenged their 24–22 regular season loss in Kansas City by knocking the Chiefs out of the playoffs. Denver running back Terrell Davis ran for 101 yards and two touchdowns to lead the Broncos to victory. Chiefs quarterback Elvis Grbac threw for 260 yards, but his team could only score 10 points. Receiver Andre Rison caught eight passes for 110 yards.

Midway through the second quarter, Chiefs kicker Pete Stoyanovich appeared to open the scoring with a 34-yard field goal, but it was eliminated by a holding penalty and his second attempt hit the upright from 44 yards. Denver then went on an 8-play, 65-yard drive on the way to a 1-yard touchdown run by Davis on the first play after the two-minute warning, including John Elway's 27-yard completion to tight end Dwayne Carswell and a critical third and 7 completion to Rod Smith for 17 yards on the Chiefs 4-yard line to keep the drive going. This was the first rushing touchdown surrendered by Kansas City at home since the 1996 season, a string of 42 quarters.

In the second half, Kansas City drove 67 yards to the Broncos 3-yard line, starting with Grbac's 34-yard pass to Rison on the first play. But on third and goal, rookie tight end Tony Gonzalez was unable to keep both feet in bounds while making a catch, so they had to settle for Stoyanovich's 20-yard field goal that made the score 7–3. Denver had a big opportunity to respond on their next drive when Davis ran for a 41-yard gain to the Chiefs 11-yard line. But Derek Loville ended up losing a fumble that safety Reggie Tongue recovered. Following an exchange of punts, Grbac's 50-yard completion to receiver Joe Horn advanced the ball to the Broncos 15-yard line, and Gonzalez eventually caught a 12-yard touchdown pass to give Kansas City their first lead of the game, 10–7, going into the fourth quarter.

Early in the final quarter, Elway completed a 43-yard pass to Ed McCaffrey that set up Davis' second 1-yard touchdown run, giving the lead back to Denver, 14–10. Kansas City responded with a drive to the Denver 32-yard line. On fourth and six, they attempted to fool the Broncos with a fake field goal attempt, but holder Louie Aguiar was tackled by Darrien Gordon after picking up just three yards.

The Chiefs had one last opportunity to go ahead near the end of the game, moving the ball to the Broncos 20-yard line on a drive that included a 29-yard pass interference penalty against Denver and Grbac's 12-yard completion to Lake Dawson on fourth down and 9. Grbac later completed a 23-yard pass to Rison at the Broncos 28, but after the next three plays netted eight yards, Gordon deflected Grbac's fourth down pass in the end zone with 12 seconds left.

For the second time in three years, Kansas City was eliminated as a No. 1 seed. The Chiefs lost despite outgaining Denver in total yards (303 to 272), first downs (18 to 16) and time of possession (31:06 to 28:54). Elway completed 10 of 19 passes for 170 yards. Denver linemen Alfred Williams and Neil Smith (a former Chief) each had two sacks. This was the last game in the Hall of Fame career of Chiefs running back Marcus Allen. as well as the final post-season meeting between John Elway and Kansas City Chiefs head coach Marty Schottenheimer.

This was the first postseason meeting between the Broncos and Chiefs.

During the game, several Bronco lineman were found to have petroleum jelly smeared on their jersey and arms. Days after the game, five players (Tom Nalen, Mark Schlereth, Brian Habib, Tony Jones and Gary Zimmerman) were fined $5,000 each.

== Conference championships ==
=== Sunday, January 11, 1998 ===
==== AFC: Denver Broncos 24, Pittsburgh Steelers 21 ====
Denver Broncos vs. Pittsburgh Steelers – Game summary

Quarter	1	2	3	4	Total
Broncos	7	17	0	0	24
Steelers	7	7	0	7	21

at Three Rivers Stadium, Pittsburgh, Pennsylvania

- Game time: 12:30 p.m. EST
- Game weather: 39 °F (4 °C), clear
- Game attendance: 61,382
- Referee: Ron Blum
- TV announcers (NBC): Dick Enberg (play-by-play), Phil Simms, and Paul Maguire (color commentators)

Game information

First quarter

- DEN – Terrell Davis 8-yard run (Jason Elam kick). Broncos 7–0.
- PIT – Kordell Stewart 33-yard run (Norm Johnson kick). Tie 7–7.

Second quarter

- PIT – Jerome Bettis 1-yard run (Norm Johnson kick). Steelers 14–7.
- DEN – Jason Elam 43-yard field goal. Steelers 14–10.
- DEN – Howard Griffith 16-yard pass from John Elway (Jason Elam kick). Broncos 17–14.
- DEN – Ed McCaffrey 1-yard pass from John Elway (Jason Elam kick). Broncos 24–14.

Third quarter

- No scoring plays

Fourth quarter

- PIT – Charles Johnson 15-yard pass from Kordell Stewart (Norm Johnson kick). Broncos 24–21.

Top passers

- DEN – John Elway – 18/31, 210 yards, 2 TD, INT
- PIT – Kordell Stewart – 18/36, 201 yards, TD, 3 INT

Top rushers

- DEN – Terrell Davis – 26 rushes, 139 yards, TD
- PIT – Jerome Bettis – 23 rushes, 105 yards, TD

Top receivers

- DEN – Rod Smith – 6 receptions, 87 yards
- PIT – Yancey Thigpen – 6 receptions, 92 yards

For the second week in a row, Denver eliminated a team on the road who had beat them in the regular season. In Week 15, Pittsburgh had defeated the Broncos 35–24, with quarterback Kordell Stewart throwing for 303 yards and three touchdowns, while running for two more. But this time, Denver intercepted three of his passes and recovered a fumble, while also sacking him three times.

Most of the scoring came in the first half. Pittsburgh got an early scoring opportunity when Levon Kirkland intercepted a pass from Denver quarterback John Elway on the Broncos 43-yard line. The Steelers then moved the ball to the 20, only to have Norm Johnson miss a 38-yard field goal attempt. On the next play Denver running back Terrell Davis took off for a 43-yard run to the Steelers 29-yard line, and the team went on to score on Davis' 8-yard touchdown run. Will Blackwell returned the ensuing kickoff 18 yards to the 35-yard line, where Pittsburgh went on to move the ball 65 yards to tie the game. On the final two plays, Stewart completed a 20-yard pass to Yancey Thigpen and then ran the ball the final 33 yards to the end zone. Steelers safety Darren Perry ended Denver's next drive by forcing and recovering a fumble from Davis on the Pittsburgh 32-yard line. Pittsburgh then drove 68 yards in 11 plays to go up 14–7 on Jerome Bettis' 1-yard touchdown run a few minutes into the second quarter.

The Broncos took the ball back and went on a 10-play, 45-yard drive to score on kicker Jason Elam's 43-yard field goal. Both teams had to punt on their next drives, and Blackwell's 19-yard return gave the Steelers a first down on the Broncos 43-yard line. But two plays later, Stewart forced a throw into double coverage and safety Ray Crockett intercepted his pass in the end zone. After the turnover, Elway led the Broncos 80 yards to score on his 15-yard touchdown pass to fullback Howard Griffith, giving the Broncos the lead, 17–14. The Steelers had to punt on their next drive, and Darrien Gordon returned the ball 19 yards to the Broncos 46, setting up a 54-yard drive that ended on Elway's 1-yard touchdown pass to Ed McCaffrey that gave Denver a 24–14 lead with 13 seconds left in the half. 34 of their 54 yards came from a pass interference penalty on Steelers cornerback Carnell Lake on the first play of the drive.

Both defenses controlled most of the second half. The Steelers took the opening drive of the second half and moved the ball methodically down the field and had a great scoring chance at the Broncos 5-yard line. But linebacker Allen Aldridge ended the possession with an interception in the end zone. The next time the Steelers got the ball, they moved it to the Broncos 32, only to lose it again when Neil Smith forced a fumble while sacking Stewart and Denver's Mike Lodish made the recovery.

Late in the fourth quarter, Stewart completed seven of eight passes for 68 yards and rushed twice for 11 yards on a 79-yard drive that ended with his 14-yard touchdown pass to Charles Johnson, cutting the score to 24–21 with 2:46 left in regulation. At the two-minute warning, facing third down and 5 on their own 15-yard line on their ensuing drive, Elway connected on an 18-yard completion to Shannon Sharpe for a first down. Then on the next play, he completed a 10-yard pass to McCaffrey for another first down, enabling his team to run out the rest of the clock. Sharpe later said that Elway made up the converting play in the huddle, seconds before the snap.

Davis rushed for 139 yards and a touchdown. Bettis rushed for 105 yards and a touchdown. This would turn out to be the final playoff game at Three Rivers Stadium. The next time the Steelers advanced to the playoffs would be in 2001 in brand new Heinz Field (now Acrisure Stadium). This was the first time since playoff seeding was established in 1975 that the team who finished with a better regular season record had to play a Conference Championship Game on the road.

This was the fifth postseason meeting between the Broncos and Steelers. Both teams previously split the four prior meetings.

Previous playoff games
Tied 2–2 in all-time playoff games

1977

Pittsburgh Steelers 21 @ Denver Broncos 34

1977 AFC Divisional playoffs

1978

Denver Broncos 10 @ Pittsburgh Steelers 33

1978 AFC Divisional playoffs

1984

Pittsburgh Steelers 24 @ Denver Broncos 17

1984 AFC Divisional playoffs

1989

Pittsburgh Steelers 23 @ Denver Broncos 24

1989 AFC Divisional playoffs

==== NFC: Green Bay Packers 23, San Francisco 49ers 10 ====
Green Bay Packers vs. San Francisco 49ers – Game summary

Quarter	1	2	3	4	Total
Packers	3	10	0	10	23
49ers	0	3	0	7	10

at 3Com Park, San Francisco, California

- Game time: 4:00 p.m. EST/1:00 p.m. PST
- Game weather: 57 °F (14 °C), rain
- Game attendance: 68,987
- Referee: Dick Hantak
- TV announcers (Fox): Pat Summerall (play-by-play) and John Madden (color commentator)

Game information

First quarter

- GB – Ryan Longwell 19-yard field goal. Packers 3–0.

Second quarter

- GB – Antonio Freeman 27-yard pass from Brett Favre (Ryan Longwell kick). Packers 10–0.
- SF – Gary Anderson 28-yard field goal. Packers 10–3.
- GB – Ryan Longwell 43-yard field goal. Packers 13–3.

Third quarter

- No scoring plays

Fourth quarter

- GB – Ryan Longwell 25-yard field goal. Packers 16–3.
- GB – Dorsey Levens 5-yard run (Ryan Longwell kick). Packers 23–3.
- SF – Chuck Levy 95-yard kickoff return (Gary Anderson kick). Packers 23–10.

Top passers

- GB – Brett Favre – 16/27, 222 yards, TD
- SF – Steve Young – 23/38, 250 yards, INT

Top rushers

- GB – Dorsey Levens – 27 rushes, 114 yards, TD
- SF – Terry Kirby – 6 rushes, 21 yards

Top receivers

- GB – Antonio Freeman – 4 receptions, 107 yards, TD
- SF – Terrell Owens – 6 receptions, 100 yards

For the third year in a row, Green Bay easily trounced the 49ers in the playoffs, holding them to just 257 total yards while forcing four fumbles and five sacks. The 49ers gained just 33 rushing yards and running back Garrison Hearst, who rushed for over 1,000 yards during the season, had only 12 yards on eight carries. The average starting field position for the 49ers was from their own 17-yard line.

On its opening possession, Green Bay moved the ball 76 yards in 10 plays, with Brett Favre completing an 18-yard pass to Robert Brooks. On the next play, 49ers safety Rod Woodson was called for a 24-yard pass interference penalty, moving the ball to the 49ers 35. Green Bay eventually reached the 2-yard line before a pass was deflected falling short of the wide open fullback William Henderson, forcing the Packers to settle for a field goal from Ryan Longwell.

In the second quarter, San Francisco drove 60 yards from their own 12 to the Green Bay 28, where they faced third down and 8. On the next play, Steve Young's pass was intercepted by Packers safety Eugene Robinson and returned 58 yards to the 49ers 28 in what turned out to be a crucial play. Favre then found wide receiver Antonio Freeman slicing across the middle on a slant for a 27-yard touchdown pass to give the Packers a 10–0 lead.

Later on, Green Bay managed a drive deep into San Francisco territory, but Favre committed a 15-yard intentional grounding penalty on third and 14, and Longwell missed a 47-yard field goal attempt on the next play. On the 49ers ensuing drive, they drove 52 yards in nine plays, including Young's 48-yard completion to Terrell Owens on third down and 26, to reach the Packers 10-yard line. Young nearly completed a touchdown pass to J. J. Stokes, but Stokes landed with one foot out of bounds in the end zone and the 49ers settled for a Gary Anderson field goal, cutting the score to 10–3 with less than a minute left in the half. Only 51 seconds remained after Green Bay got the ball back, but Favre got his team into scoring range with a 40-yard completion to Freeman, and Longwell capitalized with a 43-yard field goal as time expired, giving the Packers a 13–3 halftime lead.

On the first play of the second half, Favre threw a pass to Henderson, who held it briefly before dropping it. The 49ers defense believed his drop was a fumble and returned it for a touchdown, but officials ruled it to be an incomplete pass, something replays seemed to contradict. Both offenses were nearly shut down for the rest of the game, as neither team was able to mount a sustained drive. Late in the fourth quarter, Young threw an incomplete pass intended for tight end Brent Jones (playing in what would be his final game) on third and 18 from his own 7-yard line. Jones argued vehemently after the play that he was held by LeRoy Butler. No flag was thrown, however, and Tommy Thompson's ensuing punt went just 28 yards to the 49ers 35. Green Bay then drove 28 yards and increased their lead to 16–3 with Longwell's 25-yard field goal with 5:02 left in the game.

Now in a desperate situation, San Francisco tried to convert a fourth down from their own 22 on the next drive, but linebacker Keith McKenzie sacked Young for an 11-yard loss on the play, setting up Dorsey Levens' 5-yard touchdown run that made the score 23–3. Chuck Levy returned the ensuing kickoff 95 yards for a touchdown, but the 49ers could do nothing else with the final 2:52 remaining on the clock.

Favre finished the game completing 16 of 27 attempts for 222 yards and a touchdown. Levens recorded a then-playoff team record 116 rushing yards and a touchdown, while also catching six passes for 37 yards. Freeman caught four passes for 107 yards and a touchdown. Owens was the sole offensive star for his team, catching six passes for 100 yards. Levy returned three kickoffs for 127 yards and a touchdown.

This was the third year in a row the Packers defeated the 49ers in the playoffs, twice in San Francisco.

Previous playoff games
Green Bay leads 2–0 in all-time playoff games

1995

Green Bay Packers 27 @ San Francisco 49ers 17

1995 NFC Divisional playoffs

1996

San Francisco 49ers 14 @ Green Bay Packers 35

1996 NFC Divisional playoffs

== Super Bowl XXXII: Denver Broncos 31, Green Bay Packers 24 ==
Super Bowl XXXII – Green Bay Packers vs. Denver Broncos – Game summary

Quarter	1	2	3	4	Total
Packers (NFC)	7	7	3	7	24
Broncos (AFC)	7	10	7	7	31

at Qualcomm Stadium, San Diego, California

- Date: January 25, 1998
- Game attendance: 68,912
- Referee: Ed Hochuli
- TV announcers (NBC): Dick Enberg (play-by-play), Phil Simms, and Paul Maguire (color commentators)

This was the first Super Bowl meeting between the Packers and Broncos.

== Bibliography ==
- Total Football: The Official Encyclopedia of the National Football League (ISBN 0-06-270174-6)
