= Hosein Khajeh-Hosseiny =

British private equity investor, venture capitalist and philanthropist

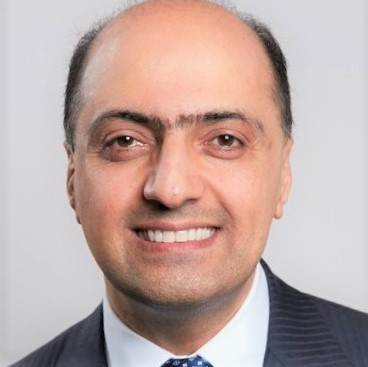
- Born: May 1, 1964 (age 62); Kerman, Iran
- Education: PhD. University of Cambridge, M.Sc. University of Southampton, BA University of Nottingham
- Occupations: Investor, advisor, philanthropist
- Spouse: Afsaneh Yasmin Khajeh-Hosseiny

Hosein Khajeh-Hosseiny (born 1964) is a British private equity investor, venture capitalist and philanthropist. He is the founder and Chairman of Open X Innovations LLC, an asset management firm, and Trinity Natural Capital Group, a company with three subsidiaries: Trinity AgTech, Trinity Natural Capital Markets, and Trinity Global Farm Pioneers, all focused on supporting the transition of agriculture towards greater sustainability and profitability .

== Education ==
Khajeh-Hosseiny holds a PhD in Applied Mathematics and Econometrics from the University of Cambridge and has spoken on ethics, growth and investment for several years in graduate courses at the Judge Business School in Cambridge. He also holds a Master's degree in Finance and a BA in Economics.

== Career ==
Khajeh-Hosseiny is the chairman of Trinity Sky LLP, a family investment office, and the founder and chairman of Open X Innovations LLC, a London and San Francisco-based investment, advisory and asset management firm with a focus on artificial intelligence-enabled enterprise technologies. He is the former CEO and Managing General Partner of Northgate Capital. Prior to Northgate, he was Head of Global Private Equity Investments at McKinsey's Investment Office (MIO Partners) in New York and London.

In 2019 he founded the first of three agricultural technology companies: Trinity AgTech, headquartered in London, U.K. The company develops and markets Smart farm management and decision support software for the agricultural ecosystem including farmers, retailers, banks, cooperatives and standard assurance agencies. The company’s product for farmers, named Sandy, was released in July 2021. In October 2021, Trinity Natural Capital Markets was launched to provide an online marketplace for trading high quality carbon and biodiversity credits. In January 2022, Trinity Global Farm Pioneers, a non-profit digital engagement and collaboration platform for all stakeholders in global agriculture was launched.

== Public service ==
In June 2018, Khajeh-Hosseiny was elected to the board of trustees of the Brookings Institution headquartered in Washington, D.C. In 2000, he helped found the U.K. non-profit, UnLtd (The U.K. Foundation for Social Entrepreneurs) and continues as a member of the organization's investment committee. In September 2018, he was elected to the Board of Trustee of Be the Business, an organization created to close the UK's productivity gap. In February 2020, he was elected to the board of trustees of the Royal Albert Hall Trust in London, U.K. He is a judge for Cambridge University’s Social Innovation Prize, which rewards individuals whose work creates social change at a local or national level. In October, 2022, Khajeh-Hosseiny was appointed to the board of trustees of the RSA, (The Royal Society for the Encouragement of Arts, Manufactures and Commerce). In June 2024, Khajeh-Hosseiny was elected to the board of trustees of the RASE, (The Royal Agricultural Society of England). In January 2025 Khajeh-Hosseiny was elected to the board of trustees of the United Kingdom’s NATIONAL OCEANOGRAPHY CENTRE (NOC) and Chairman of NOC Innovations.

== Personal life ==
Khajeh-Hosseiny is married to Afsaneh Yasmin Khajeh-Hosseiny. They reside in London and San Francisco.
