= Tommy Vardell =

American football player (born 1969)

No. 44
- Position: Fullback

Personal information
- Born: February 20, 1969 (age 57); El Cajon, California, U.S.
- Listed height: 6 ft 1 in (1.85 m)
- Listed weight: 238 lb (108 kg)

Career information
- High school: Granite Hills (El Cajon)
- College: Stanford
- NFL draft: 1992: 1st round, 9th overall pick

Career history
- Cleveland Browns (1992–1995); San Francisco 49ers (1996); Detroit Lions (1997–1998); San Francisco 49ers (1999)

Awards and highlights
- Pop Warner Trophy (1991); First-team All-Pac-10 (1991)

Career NFL statistics
- Rushing yards: 1,427
- Rushing average: 3.5
- Receptions: 119
- Receiving yards: 1,010
- Total touchdowns: 21
- Stats at Pro Football Reference

Thomas Arthur "Touchdown Tommy" Vardell (born February 20, 1969) is an American former professional football player who was a fullback in the National Football League (NFL). He played college football for the Stanford Cardinal and was selected by the Cleveland Browns in the first round of the 1992 NFL draft with the ninth overall pick.

== College career ==
Vardell was a star running back for the Stanford Cardinal. In 1990, he was given the nickname "Touchdown Tommy" by then Stanford head coach Denny Green after scoring four touchdowns (all from the one yard line) against Notre Dame.

For the Cardinal, Vardell rushed for 1,843 yards, scored 37 touchdowns, and never recorded a fumble in his college career. He ranks second in Stanford football history for most rushing touchdowns in a season and third for career rushing touchdowns. Vardell held the record for most rushing yards in a season by a Cardinal running back, with 1084 yards in 1991. His record was broken by Toby Gerhart in 2008 and subsequently Christian McCaffrey in 2015.

In 1990 as a junior, he carried the ball just 120 times for 441 yards but scored an impressive 14 touchdowns (one touchdown every nine carries). As a senior, he would carry the ball 226 times for 1,084 yards and score 22 touchdowns in only 11 games.

== Professional career ==
=== NFL draft ===
Pre-draft measurables
Height	Weight	Arm length	Hand span
6 ft 1 1/4 in (1.86 m)	238 lb (108 kg)	31 1/8 in (0.79 m)	9 1/4 in (0.23 m)

Vardell's performance for Stanford in 1991 resulted in him being one of the top draft picks in 1992 NFL draft. He was selected by the Cleveland Browns under then-head coach Bill Belichick in the first round with the ninth overall pick.

=== Playing career ===
In his first two years with the Browns, Vardell rushed for 1,013 yards on 270 carries and scored 3 touchdowns. He would only play 10 games combined due to injuries in the 1994 and 1995 seasons. He signed as a free agent with the San Francisco 49ers in 1996, moved on to the Detroit Lions in 1997 and 1998, and then finished his career back with the 49ers in 1999.

In his professional career, Vardell played in eight NFL seasons as the fullback for the Browns, Lions, and 49ers. He overcame a career threatening knee injury early in his career and retired in 1999 with 22 touchdowns.

He was the starting fullback when Barry Sanders rushed for 2,053 yards in the 1997–1998 NFL season.

Vardell scored the last touchdown in Tampa Stadium on December 28, 1997.

=== NFL statistics ===
Rushing Stats

Year	Team	Games	Carries	Yards	Yards per carry	Longest carry	Touchdowns	First downs	Fumbles	Fumbles lost
1992	CLE	14	99	369	3.7	35	0	14	0	0
1993	CLE	16	171	644	3.8	54	3	37	2	1
1994	CLE	5	15	48	3.2	9	0	2	0	0
1995	CLE	5	4	9	2.3	6	0	1	0	0
1996	SF	11	58	192	3.3	17	2	12	0	0
1997	DET	16	32	122	3.8	41	6	15	1	1
1998	DET	14	18	37	2.1	17	6	9	1	1
1999	SF	6	6	6	1.0	5	1	2	0	0
Career		87	403	1,427	3.5	54	18	92	4	3

Receiving Stats

Year	Team	Games	Receptions	Yards	Yards per Reception	Longest Reception	Touchdowns	First Downs	Fumbles	Fumbles Lost
1992	CLE	14	13	128	9.8	23	0	8	0	0
1993	CLE	16	19	151	7.9	28	1	8	1	1
1994	CLE	5	16	137	8.6	19	1	6	0	0
1995	CLE	5	6	18	3.0	7	0	0	0	0
1996	SF	11	28	179	6.4	22	0	7	0	0
1997	DET	16	16	218	13.6	37	0	10	0	0
1998	DET	14	14	143	10.2	31	1	6	0	0
1999	SF	6	7	36	5.1	11	0	1	0	0
Career		87	119	1,010	8.5	37	3	46	1	1

== Business career ==
In 2000, upon retiring from football, Vardell and former teammates, Brent Jones, and Mark Harris co-founded Northgate Capital, a venture capital and private equity investment firm with approximately $4.9 billion of assets under management and offices in San Francisco, Danville, Mexico City and London, and served as its managing director and founding partner. He sold a majority stake in Northgate to Indian financial services company Religare Enterprises in 2010 and continued to manage the firm as a partner. In 2016, after Religare and Northgate's management team sold 100% ownership of the firm to The Capital Partnership, an investment advisor with offices in London and Dubai, he became an advisor.

== Personal life ==
Vardell is married to Andrea Marie Cummings, with whom he has two children, Colton and Grace. They reside in the Bay Area.

Vardell was a member of the Sigma Nu fraternity at Stanford. In 1991 he was named Sigma Nu National Athlete of the Year.
