= Sunil Godhwani =

Indian businessman

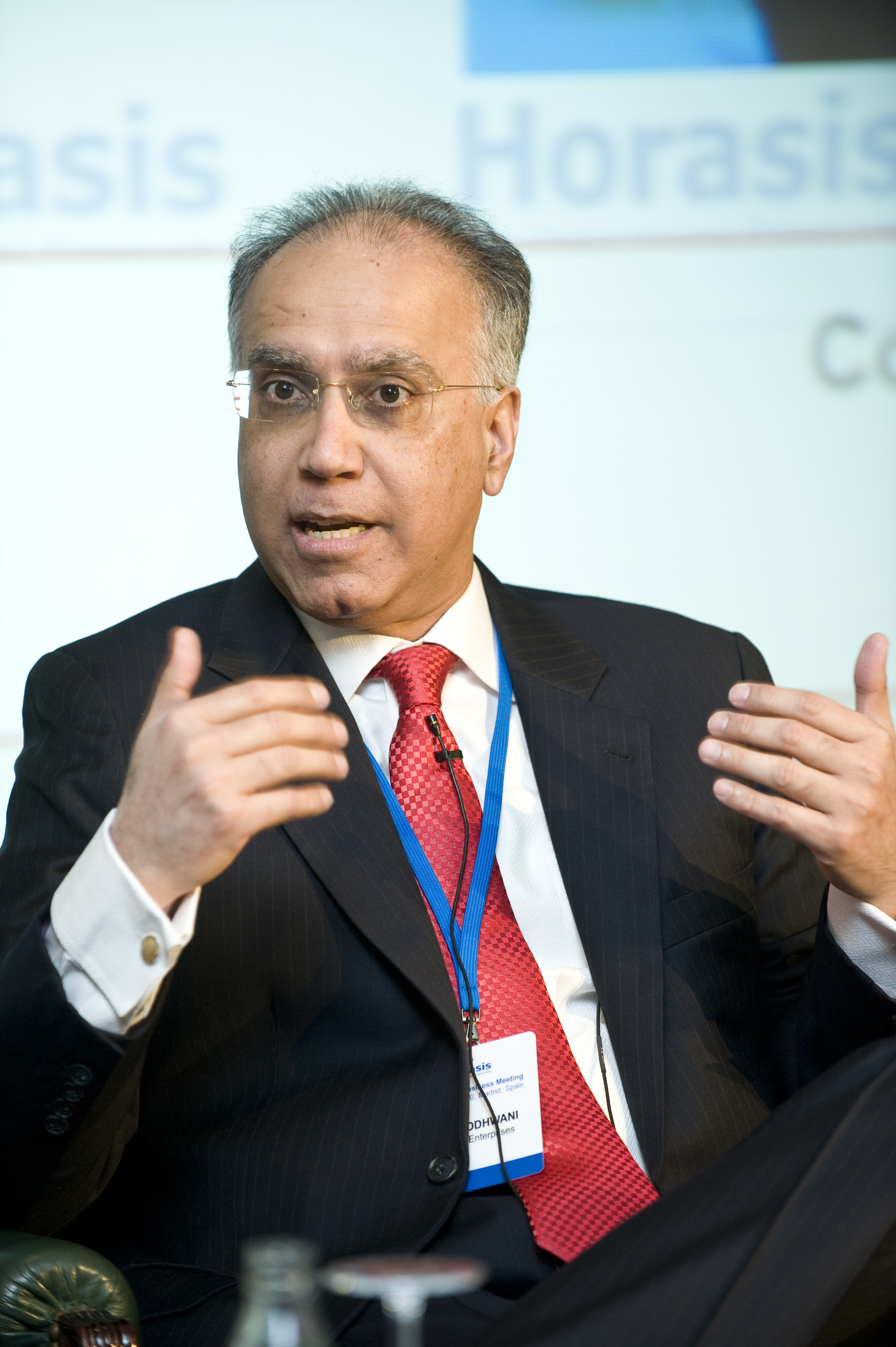
- Sunil Godhwani during Horasis Global India Business Meeting in 2010
- Born: 10 December 1960 (age 65); New Delhi
- Other name: Sunil Naraindas Godhwani
- Education: New York University Tandon School of Engineering
- Occupation: Former Director of Religare
- Known for: Chairman of Religare

Sunil Godhwani (born 10 December 1960) is an Indian business executive who was associated with Religare from 2007 to 2018.

Godhwani was the Managing Director since 9 April 2007 and Chairman since 6 April 2010 of Religare. Since 2019, court proceedings have been in progress relative to the firm's management, and Godhwani was arrested on suspicion of fraud in June 2022.

He has participated in various business platforms such as the Confederation of Indian Industry (CII) and the Federation of Indian Chambers of Commerce & Industry (FICCI).

== Early life and education ==
Godhwani was born on 10 December 1960 and raised in New Delhi, India, to a Sindhi family. He received a B.Sc. degree in chemical engineering and a M.Sc. in industrial engineering & finance from New York University Tandon School of Engineering.
