= Stacey Hairston =

American gridiron football player and coach (born 1967)

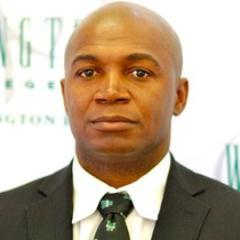

Biographical details
- Born: August 16, 1967 (age 59); Columbus, Ohio, U.S.
- Education: Ohio Northern University

Playing career
- 1989: Dallas Cowboys
- 1990–1992: Saskatchewan Roughriders
- 1993: Seattle Seahawks
- 1993–1995: Cleveland Browns
- Position: Defensive back

Coaching career (HC unless noted)
- 1996–2002: Ohio Northern (DB/ST)
- 2003: Ohio Northern (interim HC)
- 2004–2007: Ohio Northern (DC/ST)
- 2009–2010: Edmonton Eskimos (DB)
- 2012: Bluefield (DC)
- 2013–2016: Wilmington (OH)
- 2017: Urbana (DC)

Head coaching record
- Overall: 5–45

Stacey Hairston (born August 16, 1967) is an American former gridiron football coach and player. He was most recently the defensive coordinator at Urbana University in Urbana, Ohio, in 2017. Hairston was head football coach at Wilmington College in Wilmington, Ohio from 2013 until 2016. He served as the interim head coach at Ohio Northern University for one season, in 2003.

== College career ==
Hairston played college football and was on the diving team at Ohio Northern University.

== Professional career ==
=== Dallas Cowboys ===
Hairston was with the Dallas Cowboys for the 1989 season.

=== Saskatchewan Roughriders ===
From 1990 to 1992 Hairston played with the Saskatchewan Roughriders of the Canadian Football League (CFL).

=== Seattle Seahawks ===
Hairston spent a brief period of time with the Seattle Seahawks in 1993, but was waived.

=== Cleveland Browns ===
Hairston played for the Cleveland Browns for the 1993 season and 1994 season (Hairston was on the injured reserve for the 1995 season).

== Coaching career ==
For the vast majority of his career Hairston was a coach at Ohio Northern University culminating as being named interim head coach in 2003. Hairston has also been on the coaching staff of the Edmonton Eskimos of the Canadian Football league and of Bluefield College. Hairston was also the women's golf coach at Ohio Northern and is a six handicap as a player.

=== Wilmington ===
Hairston became the coach at Wilmington College in Wilmington, Ohio for the 2013 season, which plays in the Ohio Athletic Conference (the same conference as Ohio Northern). In his first two seasons, the Quakers compiled a record of 0–20. Hairston's first victory as head coach of Wilmington came in first game of the 2015 season, a 14–10 win over non-conference opponent Bluffton. His teams lost every game remaining that year and were winless the following season, in 2016. Hairston resigned from his post at Wilmington on November 18, 2016, having collected record of 1–39 over four seasons with no wins in conference play.

== Head coaching record ==
Year	Team	Overall	Conference	Standing	Bowl/playoffs
Ohio Northern Polar Bears (Ohio Athletic Conference) (2003)
2003	Ohio Northern	4–6	4–5	T–5th	
Ohio Northern:		4–6	4–5		
Wilmington Quakers (Ohio Athletic Conference) (2013–2016)
2013	Wilmington	0–10	0–9	10th	
2014	Wilmington	0–10	0–9	10th	
2015	Wilmington	1–9	0–9	10th	
2016	Wilmington	0–10	0–9	10th	
Wilmington:		1–39	0–36		
Total:		5–45			
