= Northgate Capital =

American venture capital and private equity investment firm

- Industry: Venture capital
- Founded: 2000; 26 years ago
- Founder: Brent Jones; Tommy Vardell
- Headquarters: San Francisco, California; Danville, California; London, United Kingdom; Mexico City, Mexico
- Key people: Alfredo Alfaro (Managing director)
- AUM: $4.9 billion (2019)
- Website: northgate.com

Northgate Capital is a venture capital and private equity investment firm with approximately $4.9 billion of assets under management and offices in San Francisco, Danville, Mexico City and London.

== History ==
Northgate was founded in 2000 by Brent Jones and Tommy Vardell following their retirement from the National Football League.

In 2010, Jones and Vardell sold a majority stake in Northgate to Religare Enterprises, an Indian financial services company, and continued to manage the firm as partners.

In 2016, Religare and Northgate's management team sold 100% ownership of Northgate to The Capital Partnership.
