= Eric Turner (American football) =

American football player (1968–2000)

- Turner with the UCLA Bruins

No. 29, 42
- Position: Safety

Personal information
- Born: September 20, 1968; Ventura, California, U.S.
- Died: May 28, 2000 (aged 31); Thousand Oaks, California, U.S.
- Listed height: 6 ft 1 in (1.85 m)
- Listed weight: 215 lb (98 kg)

Career information
- High school: Ventura (Ventura, California)
- College: UCLA
- NFL draft: 1991: 1st round, 2nd overall pick

Career history
- Cleveland Browns (1991–1995); Baltimore Ravens (1996); Oakland Raiders (1997–1999)

Awards and highlights
- First-team All-Pro (1994); 2× Pro Bowl (1994, 1996); NFL interceptions co-leader (1994); PFWA All-Rookie Team (1991); Second-team All-American (1990); First-team All-Pac-10 (1990)

Career NFL statistics
- Interceptions: 30
- Interception yards: 469
- Touchdowns: 3
- Stats at Pro Football Reference

Eric Ray Turner (September 20, 1968 – May 28, 2000) was an American professional football player who was a safety for the Cleveland Browns, Baltimore Ravens and Oakland Raiders in the National Football League (NFL). He played college football for the UCLA Bruins, earning All-American honors in 1990. Turner was selected by Cleveland with the second overall pick of the 1991 NFL draft, making him the highest drafted safety and highest drafted defensive back in modern NFL history. He died of stomach cancer at the age of 31.

== College career ==
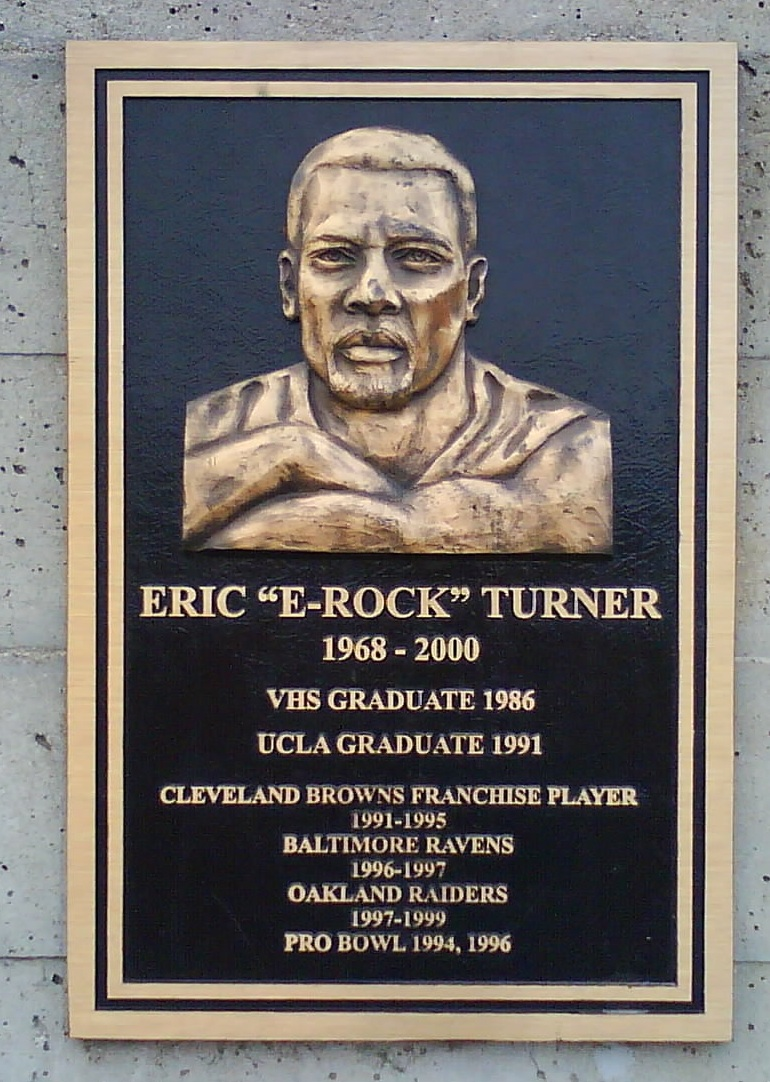
Eric Turner plaque at Ventura High School

Turner attended Ventura High School and then played college football for the UCLA Bruins, where he was an All-American in 1990. Nicknamed "E-Rock" by his teammates, Turner drew comparisons to former Bruins great Don Rogers. He was the 2nd overall pick in the 1991 NFL draft—the highest choice for a defensive back in football's modern era (technically the highest since Jerry Stovall in 1963).

== Professional career ==
Pre-draft measurables
Height	Weight	Arm length	Hand span	40-yard dash	10-yard split	20-yard split	20-yard shuttle	Vertical jump	Broad jump	Bench press
6 ft 0 7/8 in (1.85 m)	206 lb (93 kg)	31 in (0.79 m)	9 3/4 in (0.25 m)	4.51 s	1.57 s	2.64 s	4.37 s	36 1/2 in (0.93 m)	10 ft 4 in (3.15 m)	20 reps
All values from NFL Combine

=== Cleveland Browns ===
==== 1991 ====
The Cleveland Browns selected Turner in the first round (2nd overall) of the 1991 NFL draft. He became the second highest draft pick from UCLA only behind 1989 first overall pick Troy Aikman. He became the first defensive back selected first or second overall since the common NFL draft was established in 1967 and was the only defensive back until Travis Hunter was selected in 2025.

On July 15, 1991, the Browns signed Turner to a four–year, $6 million rookie contract that included an initial signing bonus of $3.15 million, making the first-year compensation a record for an NFL rookie.

He entered training camp projected to earn the role as the starting free safety under defensive coordinator Nick Saban following the departure of Felix Wright. On August 31, 1991, the Cleveland Browns officially placed Turner on injured reserve due to a stress fracture to his left leg. He subsequently remained inactive for the first eight games (Weeks 1–9) of his rookie season.

On November 3, 1991, Turner made his professional regular season debut and recorded ten combined tackles (eight solo) during a 23–21 loss at the Cincinnati Bengals. Entering Week 11, head coach Bill Belichick promoted Turner to starter as a strong safety, supplanting Harlon Barnett. On November 10, 1991, Turner earned his first career start and set a season-high with 12 combined tackles (10 solo), made one pass deflection, and had returned the first interception of his career for a touchdown as the Browns lost 32–30 against the Philadelphia Eagles. On the Eagles' first drive of the game, Turner intercepted a pass by Jim McMahon to wide receiver Calvin Williams and returned it 42–yards for the first touchdown of his career. In Week 16, he recorded seven combined tackles (four solo), one pass deflections, and intercepted a pass by Warren Moon to wide receiver Drew Hill during a 14–17 loss against the Houston Oilers. The following week, Turner recorded seven combined tackles (six solo) and three pass deflections during a 17–10 loss at the Pittsburgh Steelers in Week 17. He finished his rookie season with 68 combined tackles (53 solo), seven pass deflections, two interceptions, a fumble recovery, and one touchdown in eight games and seven starts.

==== 1992 ====
Head coach Bill Belichick named Turner the starting strong safety to begin the season and paired him with starting free safety Vince Newsome. In Week 3, Turner recorded four solo tackles and set a season-high with three pass deflections during a 28–16 victory at the Los Angeles Raiders. On October 11, 1992, Turner set a season-high with ten combined tackles (eight solo) and made his first career sack on Neil O'Donnell for an 11–yard loss as the Browns defeated the Pittsburgh Steelers 17–9. He was inactive during the Browns' 27–14 victory against the Chicago Bears in Week 13 due to an ankle injury. He finished the 1992 NFL season with 77 combined tackles (65 solo), eight pass deflections, two fumble recoveries, and one interception in 15 games and 15 starts.

==== 1993 ====
He became the starting free safety following the departure of Vince Newsome and was paired with Stevon Moore to begin the season. On September 13, 1993, Turner recorded nine combined tackles (four solo), set a season-high with three pass deflections, and intercepted a pass Steve Young threw to Jerry Rice as the Browns defeated the San Francisco 49ers 23–13. In Week 4, he set a season-high with ten combined tackles (eight solo) and had two pass deflections during a 23–10 loss at the Indianapolis Colts. In Week 16, he made three combined tackles (two solo), tied his season-high of three pass deflections, and intercepted a pass Drew Bledsoe threw to wide receiver Ray Crittenden during a 20–17 loss to the New England Patriots. The following week, Turner recorded three solo tackles, one pass deflection, and intercepted a pass T. J. Rubley threw to wide receiver Troy Drayton during a 42–14 win at the Los Angeles Rams in Week 17. He started in all 16 games throughout the 1993 NFL season and recorded 90 combined tackles (69 solo), 21 pass deflections, and five interceptions.

==== 1994 ====
He returned alongside Stevon Moore as the starting safety duo under defensive coordinator Nick Saban. In Week 2, he set a season-high with 11 combined tackles (10 solo) during a 17–10 loss to the Pittsburgh Steelers. On September 18, 1994, Turner recorded four solo tackles, two pass deflections, set a career-high with two interceptions, and returned one for a touchdown during a 32–0 victory against the Arizona Cardinals. His pick-six occurred in the fourth quarter after he intercepted a pass by Jay Schroeder and returned it 93–yards for a touchdown. The following week, he recorded five combined tackles (three solo), made one pass deflection, and secured the Browns' 21–14 victory at the Indianapolis Colts by intercepting a pass Jim Harbaugh threw to running back Marshall Faulk in Week 4. In Week 5, he made six solo tackles, two pass deflections, and had his third consecutive game with an interception, picking off a pass Jack Trudeau threw to wide receiver Rob Moore as the Browns routed the New York Jets 27–7. On November 6, 1994, Turner recorded seven combined tackles (four solo), set a season-high with four pass deflections, and intercepted two pass attempts by Drew Bledsoe during a 13–6 win against the New England Patriots. On December 24, 1994, he recorded seven combined tackles (four solo), made one pass deflection, and set a career-high with his ninth interception of the season on a pass attempt by Dan McGwire as the Browns routed the Seattle Seahawks 35–9. He started in all 16 games throughout the season and recorded a career-high 110 combined tackles (87 solo), 19 pass deflections, five interceptions, and one touchdown. His most productive season earned him selections to Associated Press first-team All-Pro and to the 1995 Pro Bowl. His nine interceptions led the NFL in 1994.

The Cleveland Browns finished the 1994 NFL season in second place in the AFC Central with an 11–5 record to earn a Wild-Card position. On January 1, 1995, Turner started in the first playoff appearance of his career and recorded three combined tackles (two solo), two pass deflections, and intercepted a pass Drew Bledsoe threw to running back Kevin Turner as they defeated the New England Patriots 20–13 in the AFC Wild-Card Game. The following game, he recorded ten combined tackles (six solo) and recovered a fumble during a 29–9 loss at the Pittsburgh Steelers in the Divisional Round.

==== 1995–1997 ====
On August 31, 1995, the Cleveland Browns re-signed Turner to a three—year, $8.40 million contract that included a signing bonus of $2.75 million, ending a 40-day holdout through training camp.

After the Browns moved to Baltimore in 1996, Turner played one season for the new Baltimore Ravens. He made his second Pro Bowl and was second on the team with 112 tackles and tied for lead with five interceptions, although those numbers went largely unnoticed on a defense that allowed 441 points, third-highest in the league. Following the 1996 season Turner, who had the most expensive contract among all NFL safeties, was cut by the Ravens and became an unrestricted free agent for the first time in his six-year career.

=== Oakland Raiders ===
On April 25, 1997, the Oakland Raiders signed Turner to a four–year, $6 million contract that included a signing bonus of $1 million.

== Illness and death ==
In the 2000 NFL offseason, after missing April mini camp with the Raiders, rumors would start circulating that Turner was suffering from stomach cancer after it was reported that Turner had lost about 70 pounds from the 215-pounds he was at during the 1999 season. Two weeks before his death, Turner would release a statement through his agent attempting to dispute any rumors about his health stating "I realize people are concerned, but I have chosen to keep this issue within my family…" "…Contrary to published reports, I have not lost 70 pounds and am not gravely ill."

On May 28, 2000, Turner would be rushed to Los Robles Hospital & Medical Center in Thousand Oaks, California via ambulance after reportedly having trouble breathing. He would be admitted into intensive care and died six hours after arrival at the age of 31. The cause of Turner's death was listed as "complications of abdominal cancer."

Upon his death, teammate Napoleon Kaufman said "He was compassionate and a class act. It was truly a pleasure to have known Eric and I will miss him." Another teammate, Greg Biekert, said "He always brought his competitive nature to the team, especially on defense. He was truly someone who you wanted around, I mean in life, too."

In 2001, he was named to the Ventura County Sports Hall of Fame. The football field at Ventura High School is named in his honor. He was later inducted into the UCLA Athletics Hall of Fame in 2008.

== See also ==
- List of gridiron football players who died during their careers

== NFL career statistics ==
Year	Team	Games		Tackles				Interceptions					Fumbles			
Year	Team	GP	GS	Comb	Solo	Ast	Sck	Int	Yds	Avg	Lng	TD	FF	FR	Yds	TD
1991	CLE	8	7	84	—	—	0.0	2	42	21.0	42	1	0	1	0	0
1992	CLE	15	13	119	—	—	1.0	1	6	6.0	6	0	0	2	0	0
1993	CLE	16	16	159	—	—	0.0	5	25	5.0	19	0	0	0	0	0
1994	CLE	16	16	105	82	23	1.0	9	199	22.1	93	1	1	1	0	0
1995	CLE	8	8	57	40	17	0.0	0	0	0.0	0	0	0	0	0	0
1996	BAL	14	14	81	68	13	0.0	5	1	0.2	1	0	0	0	0	0
1997	OAK	16	15	108	89	19	0.0	2	45	22.5	29	0	1	3	65	1
1998	OAK	6	6	38	33	5	1.0	3	108	36.0	94	1	0	0	0	0
1999	OAK	10	10	50	42	8	0.0	3	43	14.3	24	0	0	2	34	0
Career		109	105	801	354	85	3.0	30	469	15.6	94	3	2	9	99	1
