= Jed DeVries =

American football player (born 1971)

No. 60
- Position: Tackle

Personal information
- Born: January 6, 1971 (age 55); Ogden, Utah, U.S.
- Listed height: 6 ft 6 in (1.98 m)
- Listed weight: 300 lb (136 kg)

Career information
- High school: Weber
- College: Utah State
- NFL draft: 1994: undrafted

Career history
- Seattle Seahawks (1994)*; Cleveland Browns (1994–1995); Baltimore Ravens (1996)*; Philadelphia Eagles (1997)*
- * Offseason or practice squad member only

Career NFL statistics
- Games played: 2
- Games Started: 0
- Stats at Pro Football Reference

Jed W. DeVries (born January 6, 1971) is an American former professional football player who was a tackle in the National Football League (NFL). He played for the Seattle Seahawks, Cleveland Browns, Baltimore Ravens and Philadelphia Eagles from 1994 to 1997. He played college football for the Utah State Aggies. He played two games during 1995 season.
