= Derrick Cullors =

American football player (born 1972)

No. 29
- Position: Running back

Personal information
- Born: December 26, 1972 (age 53); Dallas, Texas, U.S.
- Listed height: 6 ft 0 in (1.83 m)
- Listed weight: 195 lb (88 kg)

Career information
- High school: Dallas (TX) Lake Highlands
- College: Murray State
- NFL draft: 1996: undrafted

Career history
- Baltimore Ravens (1996)*; New England Patriots (1996–1999)
- * Offseason or practice squad member only

Career NFL statistics
- Rushing yards: 149
- Yards per carry: 3.7
- Rushing touchdowns: 0
- Receptions: 16
- Receiving yards: 154
- Receiving touchdowns: 1
- Stats at Pro Football Reference

Derrick Shane Cullors (born December 26, 1972) is an American former professional football player in the National Football League (NFL). He was with the New England Patriots for four years, as a running back and kick returner.

While only rushing for 149 yards in his entire career Cullors did play a significant role for the Patriots during the 1997-98 NFL playoffs. With star running back Curtis Martin injured he helped lead the Patriots to victory over the Miami Dolphins during the Wildcard round. On a pivotal drive in the 3rd quarter, the first sustained scoring drive for either team, he contributed by carrying the ball 7 times for 42 yards, which ended in a field goal to give the Patriots a 17–0 lead. They would go on to win 17–3 as Cullors ended up being the game's leading rusher with 86 yards on 22 carries.

In 1998, he finished tied for third in the AFC, with 1085 yards on 45 returns. Cullors scored his lone offensive NFL touchdown on a pass from Drew Bledsoe during a Week 13 victory over the Buffalo Bills in 1998. He also had an 86 yard kickoff return for touchdown against the Buffalo Bills in week 11 of the 1997 season.
