= 1994 All-Pro Team =

Official list of the best NFL players in 1994

The 1994 All-Pro Team is composed of the National Football League players that were named to the Associated Press, Pro Football Writers Association, and The Sporting News All-Pro Teams in 1994. Both first and second teams are listed for the AP team. These are the three teams that are included in Total Football II: The Official Encyclopedia of the National Football League. In 1994 the Pro Football Writers Association and Pro Football Weekly combined their All-pro teams, a practice with continues through 2008.

== Teams ==
Offense
Position	First team	Second team
Quarterback	Steve Young, San Francisco 49ers (AP, PFWA, TSN)	Dan Marino, Miami Dolphins (AP-2)
Running back	Emmitt Smith, Dallas Cowboys (AP, PFWA, TSN); Barry Sanders, Detroit Lions (AP, PFWA, TSN)	Chris Warren, Seattle Seahawks (AP-2); Marshall Faulk, Indianapolis Colts (AP-2)
Wide receiver	Cris Carter, Minnesota Vikings (AP, PFWA, TSN); Jerry Rice, San Francisco 49ers (AP, PFWA, TSN)	Terance Mathis, Atlanta Falcons (AP-2); Irving Fryar, Miami Dolphins (AP-2)
Tight end	Ben Coates, New England Patriots (AP. PFWA, TSN)	Brent Jones, San Francisco 49ers (AP-2)
Tackle	Willie Roaf, New Orleans Saints (AP, PFWA, TSN); Richmond Webb, Miami Dolphins (AP, PFWA, TSN)	Tony Jones, Cleveland Browns (AP-2); Lomas Brown, Detroit Lions (AP-2)
Guard	Randall McDaniel, Minnesota Vikings (AP, PFWA, TSN); Nate Newton, Dallas Cowboys (AP, PFWA); Steve Wisniewski, Los Angeles Raiders (TSN)	Keith Sims, Miami Dolphins (AP-2); Steve Wisniewski, Los Angeles Raiders (AP-2)
Center	Dermontti Dawson, Pittsburgh Steelers (AP, PFWA, TSN)	Mark Stepnoski, Dallas Cowboys (AP-2)

Special teams
Position	First team	Second team
Kicker	John Carney, San Diego Chargers (AP, TSN); Fuad Reveiz, Minnesota Vikings (PFWA)	Fuad Reveiz, Minnesota Vikings (AP-2)
Punter	Reggie Roby, Washington Redskins (AP, PFWA, TSN)	Rick Tuten, Seattle Seahawks (AP-2)
Kick Returner	Mel Gray, Detroit Lions (AP, PFWA, TSN)	Brian Mitchell, Washington Redskins (AP-2)
Punt Returner	Brian Mitchell, Washington Redskins (PFWA); Eric Metcalf, Cleveland Browns (TSN)	
Special Teams	Steve Tasker, Buffalo Bills (PFWA)	

Defense
Position	First team	Second team
Defensive end	Charles Haley, Dallas Cowboys (AP, PFWA, TSN); Bruce Smith, Buffalo Bills (AP, PFWA, TSN)	Leslie O'Neal, San Diego Chargers (AP-2); Reggie White, Green Bay Packers (AP-2)
Defensive tackle	Cortez Kennedy, Seattle Seahawks (AP); Chester McGlockton, Los Angeles Raiders (PFWA, TSN); John Randle, Minnesota Vikings (AP, PFWA, TSN)	Michael Dean Perry, Cleveland Browns (AP-2); Chester McGlockton, Los Angeles Raiders (AP-2)
Middle Linebacker	Junior Seau, San Diego Chargers (AP, PFWA, TSN); Chris Spielman, Detroit Lions (PFWA, TSN)	Chris Spielman, Detroit Lions (AP-2)
Outside linebacker	Kevin Greene, Pittsburgh Steelers (AP, PFWA, TSN); Greg Lloyd, Pittsburgh Steelers (AP, PFWA, TSN)	Derrick Thomas, Kansas City Chiefs (AP-2); Ken Harvey, Washington Redskins (AP-2)
Cornerback	Deion Sanders, San Francisco 49ers (AP, PFWA, TSN); Rod Woodson, Pittsburgh Steelers (AP, PFWA, TSN)	Aeneas Williams, Arizona Cardinals (AP-2); Terry McDaniel, Los Angeles Raiders (AP-2)
Safety	Eric Turner, Cleveland Browns (AP, PFWA); Darren Woodson, Dallas Cowboys (AP, PFWA); Merton Hanks, San Francisco 49ers (TSN)	Merton Hanks, San Francisco 49ers(AP-2); Carnell Lake, Pittsburgh Steelers (AP-2)

== Key ==
- AP = Associated Press first-team All-Pro
- AP-2 = Associated Press second-team All-Pro
- PFWA = Pro Football Writers Association All-NFL
- TSN = The Sporting News All-Pro
