= Issac Booth =

American football player (born 1971)

No. 36
- Position: Cornerback

Personal information
- Born: May 23, 1971 (age 55); Indianapolis, Indiana, U.S.
- Listed height: 6 ft 5 in (1.96 m)
- Listed weight: 193 lb (88 kg)

Career information
- High school: Perry Meridian (Indianapolis, Indiana)
- College: California
- NFL draft: 1994: 5th round, 141st overall pick

Career history
- Cleveland Browns (1994–1995); Baltimore Ravens (1996)

Career NFL statistics
- Tackles: 61
- Interceptions: 2
- Forced fumbles: 1
- Stats at Pro Football Reference

Issac Ramoun Booth (born May 23, 1971) is an American former professional football player who played three seasons in the National Football League (NFL) with the Cleveland Browns and Baltimore Ravens. Booth was drafted by the Browns in the fifth round of the 1994 NFL draft and played cornerback for the Browns for the 1994 and 1995 seasons, earning one start in each of his first two seasons. After the 1995 season the original Cleveland Browns relocated to Baltimore, Maryland and became the Baltimore Ravens. Booth played his final season with the Ravens playing in 11 games and earning a career high three starts. Booth retired from football after the 1996 season. During his brief career, Booth played in 36 games, earning five starts, 55 tackles, two interceptions and one forced fumble.
