= Mark Harris (American football) =

American football player (born 1970)

No. 19, 88
- Position: Wide receiver

Personal information
- Born: April 28, 1970; Clovis, New Mexico, U.S.
- Listed height: 6 ft 4 in (1.93 m)
- Listed weight: 201 lb (91 kg)

Career information
- High school: Box Elder (Brigham City, Utah)
- College: Southern Utah; Ricks College; Stanford
- NFL draft: 1996: undrafted

Career history
- Dallas Cowboys (1996)*; San Francisco 49ers (1996–1999)
- * Offseason or practice squad member only

Awards and highlights
- Second-team All-Pac-10 (1995)

Career NFL statistics
- Games played: 37
- Receptions: 13
- Receiving Yards: 186
- Stats at Pro Football Reference

Mark Edward Harris (born April 28, 1970) is an American former professional football player who was a wide receiver for five seasons with the San Francisco 49ers of the National Football League (NFL). He played college football for the Stanford Cardinal.
