= Religare =

Indian financial services company

Religare Enterprises Limited.
- Type: Public
- Traded as: NSE: RELIGARE; BSE: 532915
- Industry: Financial services
- Headquarters: New Delhi, India
- Key people: Rashmi Saluja (Chairperson)
- Services: SME finance; NBFC; Retail Broking; Health Insurance
- Revenue: ▲₹6,235 crore (US$650 million) (2024)
- Operating income: ▼₹318 crore (US$33 million) (2024)
- Net income: ▼₹347 crore (US$36 million) (2024)
- Total assets: ▲₹9,577 crore (US$990 million) (2024)
- Total equity: ▲₹2,343 crore (US$240 million) (2024)
- Subsidiaries: Religare Finvest Ltd; Religare Broking Ltd; Care Health Insurance
- Website: www.religare.com

Religare Enterprises Limited (REL) is an Indian investment and financial services holding company, headquartered in New Delhi. REL is listed on National Stock Exchange of India and Bombay Stock Exchange. It is registered with the Reserve Bank of India (RBI).

== History ==
Founded in 1982, initially Religare was a stock brokerage firm called Religare Securities Limited (RSL) and was admitted to the National Stock Exchange (NSE) in 1994. The erstwhile promoters were Malvinder Mohan Singh and Shivinder Mohan Singh who were part of Ranbaxy Group before selling their stake in Ranbaxy to Daiichi Sankyo in 2008. In 2000, it secured membership of the Futures and Options segment of the NSE and also registered with National Securities Depository Limited (NSDL) as a depository participant.

Religare Finvest Ltd (RFL), a group company, was founded in 2001 as a private non-banking financial institution. In 2002, RSL received registration as ‘Portfolio Manager’ from Securities and Exchange Board of India (SEBI). RSL registered with Central Depository Services Limited (CDSL) as a depository participant in 2003. It also became a stock broker at the Bombay Stock Exchange (BSE) in 2004. In the same year, Religare Commodities Limited, a commodities broking company, started operations as a ‘trading cum clearing member’ at both the Multi Commodity Exchange (MCX) and the National Commodity and Derivatives Exchange (NCDEX).

An office was established in London in 2006. In 2006, RSL received registration as Merchant Banker in Category – I from SEBI. Religare announced a joint venture with Macquarie Bank Ltd. in October 2007 to expand its wealth management business. REL went public with an initial public offering (IPO) of its stock in November, 2007, which was oversubscribed 159 times. The same year, RSL received membership of derivative segment of the BSE as trading-cum-clearing member.

In 2008, Religare started a joint-venture life assurance business with Aegon N.V. and Bennett, Coleman & Company called Aegon Religare Life Insurance Company. Religare exited the joint venture in 2015 by selling its stake to Bennett, Coleman & Company.

In 2011, Religare Finvest successfully issued non-convertible debentures (NCDs) worth ₹800 crores. In December 2011, Avigo Capital and in January 2012, Jacob Ballas invest in Religare Finvest Limited (RFL). In 2012 International Finance Corporation (IFC), an arm of World Bank Group, invested in Religare. Religare Health Insurance Company Limited (RHIC) started operations in 2012. Union Bank of India and Corporation Bank tie up with Religare Health Insurance. In 2013 Religare bought Macquarie's stake in the wealth management business. In the same year the name of Religare Mutual Fund was changed to Religare Invesco Mutual Fund. In 2014 Religare announced acquiring a 26% stake in YourNest Angel Fund through its Global Asset Management arm (RGAM). Religare has exited its global asset management business. In February 2017, Anand Rathi Wealth Management acquired Religare's wealth management business. In April 2017, Religare announced that it had sold its stake to the True North a consortium of PE investors.

Kavi Arora was the MD & CEO of Religare from Nov 2011 to 2017. In January 2018 Reserve Bank of India (RBI) put RFL under a Corrective Action Plan (CAP) due to issues emanating from siphoning and misappropriation of funds by erstwhile promoters of REL and their associates and it was prohibited by RBI from expanding its Credit portfolio other than investments in Government Securities.

The Enforcement Directorate (ED) has been investigating Religare based on a case filed by the Delhi Police in 2019. The Delhi Police had arrested erstwhile founders Shivinder Mohan Singh and Malvinder Mohan Singh, as well as, former CMD of Religare Enterprises, Sunil Godhwani. The ED took their custody and a charge sheet was filed in January 2020.

RFL defaulted on interest payment to bond holders due on February 25, 2022, due to asset liability mismatch, said to arise out of siphoning and misappropriation of funds by erstwhile promoters of its parent company.

RFL and REL entered into a settlement agreement with 16 lenders in Dec 2022 (including SBI, Bank of Baroda, UBI, Canara Bank, PNB, BoI, IDBI Bank, P&SB, BoM) and a one time settlement (OTS) was completed in Mar 2023.

In Dec 2023 Delhi High Court directed the removal of the Fraud label from RFL by Lenders.

== Subsidiaries ==
- Religare Finvest Limited (RFL)
- Religare Housing Development Corporation Finance Limited (RHDFCL)
- Care Health Insurance (70%)
