= 1995 Cleveland Browns season =

50th season in franchise history, final one before being "deactivated"

- Owner: Art Modell
- Head coach: Bill Belichick
- Offensive coordinator: Steve Crosby
- Defensive coordinator: Rick Venturi
- Home stadium: Cleveland Municipal Stadium

Results
- Record: 5–11
- Division place: 4th AFC Central
- Playoffs: Did not qualify
- Pro Bowlers: none

The 1995 Cleveland Browns season was the team's 50th season overall and 46th in the National Football League (NFL). The team finished 5–11, fourth in the AFC Central, though most of the season was overshadowed by the team's decision to leave the city following the season. The team was documented in NFL Network's A Football Life. During the season, the Browns were swept by the expansion Jacksonville Jaguars, thus becoming only the second team in the Super Bowl era to be swept by an expansion team, joining the 1966 Houston Oilers, who were swept by the Miami Dolphins that season.

After finishing 11–5 in 1994 and winning a playoff game for the first time since 1989, the Browns were favored by many to reach Cleveland's first Super Bowl. The Browns started by winning three of their first four games and were 4–4 halfway through the season. On November 6, the day after the Browns recorded their fifth loss, a 37–10 blowout against the Houston Oilers, owner Art Modell announced that he intended to move the team to Baltimore at the end of the season. Afterwards the team collapsed and only won one of their remaining seven games and head coach Bill Belichick was fired after the season.

As part of the agreement reached in February 1996 to allow Modell to move, the city of Cleveland was allowed to keep the Browns name, franchise history and all memorabilia and agreed to build a new stadium by 1999. In return, Modell was allowed to take the player contracts from the Browns, as well as the bulk of his organization, to Baltimore, but his franchise, later named the Baltimore Ravens, would be considered a 1996 expansion team. The NFL agreed that the Browns would be reactivated no later than 1999, by way of an expansion draft or relocated team.

== Offseason‌ ==
Additions	Subtractions
WR Andre Rison (Falcons)	RB Eric Metcalf (Falcons)
RB Lorenzo White (Oilers)	DT James Jones (Broncos)

=== 1995 expansion draft ===
Cleveland Browns selected during the expansion draft
Round	Selection	Name	Position	Expansion team
16	32	Mark Carrier	Wide receiver	Carolina Panthers

=== NFL draft ===
1995 Cleveland Browns draft
Round	Pick	Player	Position	College	Notes
1	30	Craig Powell	Linebacker	Ohio State	
3	84	Eric Zeier	Quarterback	Georgia	
3	94	Mike Frederick	Defensive end	Virginia	
5	136	Tau Pupua	Defensive tackle	Weber State	
5	147	Mike Miller	Wide receiver	Notre Dame	
7	231	A. C. Tellison	Wide receiver	Miami (FL)	
Made roster

==== Draft trades made ====
- Traded Eric Metcalf and 1x26 to Atlanta Falcons for pick 1x10
- Traded 1x10 to San Francisco 49ers for 1x30, 3x94, 4x119, and 1996 1st round selection.
- Traded 4th round pick to Jacksonville Jaguars for 5x136 and 1996 6th round selection.
- Traded 4x119 to Philadelphia Eagles for 5x147 and 1996 5th round selection.
- Traded 7th round pick to New England Patriots for 7x231.

=== Undrafted free agents ===
1995 undrafted free agents of note
Player	Position	College
Vashone Adams	Safety	Eastern Michigan
Donny Brady	Cornerback	Wisconsin
Toby Cates	Wide receiver	South Carolina
Greg DeLong	Tight end	North Carolina
Joe Fleming	Defensive linemen	New Hampshire
Elliott Fortune	Defensive end	Georgia Tech
Don Hickson	Linebacker	Georgia Tech
Earnest Hunter	Running back	Southeastern Oklahoma State
Sale Isaia	Guard	UCLA
Randy Neal	Linebacker	Virginia
Pulu Poumele	Guard	Arizona
Andre Royal	Linebacker	Alabama
Joe Smigiel	Offensive linemen	Arizona
Avrom Smith	Running back	New Hampshire

== Personnel ==
=== Staff ===
1995 Cleveland Browns staff
Front office: Owner and president – Art Modell; Director of player personnel – Michael Lombardi; Director of pro personnel – Ozzie Newsome; Head coaches: Head coach – Bill Belichick; Offensive coaches: Offensive coordinator – Steve Crosby; Wide receivers – Mike Sheppard; Offensive line – Kirk Ferentz; Assistant offensive line/tight ends – Pat Hill; Offensive assistant – Ernie Adams; Offensive assistant – John Settle	Defensive coaches: Defensive coordinator – Rick Venturi; Defensive line – Jacob Burney; Linebackers – Chuck Bresnahan; Secondary – Jim Bates; Defensive Assistant - Tom Spann; Special teams coaches: Special teams – Scott O'Brien; Coaches Assistant - Eric Mangini; Strength and conditioning: Strength and conditioning – Jerry Simmons; Pass Rush Consultant - Joe Kim

=== Roster ===
1995 Cleveland Browns roster
Quarterbacks: 12 Vinny Testaverde; 10 Eric Zeier; Running backs: 21 Earnest Byner; 23 Earnest Hunter; 22 Ricky Powers; 44 Tommy Vardell FB; 34 Lorenzo White; Wide receivers: 85 Derrick Alexander; 83 Michael Bates; 86 Ray Ethridge; 81 Michael Jackson; 87 Keenan McCardell; 80 Andre Rison; 84 Rico Smith; Tight ends: 89 Harold Bishop; 48 Frank Hartley; 88 Brian Kinchen LS	Offensive linemen: 70 Herman Arvie T; 77 Orlando Brown T; 72 Bob Dahl G; 60 Jed DeVries T; 61 Steve Everitt C; 66 Tony Jones T; 67 Quentin Neujahr C; 68 Lonnie Palelei G; 63 Wally Williams G; Defensive linemen: 90 Rob Burnett DE; 96 Chad Eaton DT; 78 Dan Footman DE; 94 Mike Frederick DT; 73 Tim Goad DT; 99 Rich McKenzie DE; 98 Anthony Pleasant DE; 75 Pio Sagapolutele DT; 79 Larry Webster DT	Linebackers: 58 Carl Banks OLB; 56 Mike Caldwell OLB; 51 Gerald Dixon OLB; 52 Pepper Johnson MLB; 54 Eddie Sutter MLB; Defensive backs: 43 Vashone Adams FS; 24 Donny Brady CB; 26 Mike Davis CB; 28 Don Griffin CB; 25 Dana Hall FS; 41 Tim Jacobs CB; 38 Antonio Langham CB; 27 Stevon Moore SS; 42 Louis Riddick SS; 20 Johnny Thomas CB; 37 Bennie Thompson SS; Special teams: 3 Matt Stover K; 7 Tom Tupa P	Reserve lists: 36 Issac Booth CB (IR); -- Elliott Fortune DE (IR); 33 Leroy Hoard RB (IR); 64 Sale Isaia G (IR); 95 Rick Lyle DE (IR); 59 Craig Powell LB (IR); 92 Tau Pupua DT (IR); 50 Frank Stams MLB (IR); 29 Eric Turner S (IR); Practice squad: 65 Pulu Poumele T; Rookies in italics 53 active, 9 inactive, 1 practice squad

== Regular season ==
=== Schedule ===
The Browns' record was 4–5 on November 6, the day that owner Art Modell announced the team would be moving to Baltimore, Maryland for the 1996 season. Cleveland ended the season losing six of their final seven games.

The Browns became the first NFL team to be swept by an expansion team, losing twice to the Jacksonville Jaguars.

Week	Date	Opponent	Result	Record	Venue	Attendance	Recap
1	September 3	at New England Patriots	**L** 14–17	0–1	Foxboro Stadium	60,126	Recap
2	September 10	Tampa Bay Buccaneers	**W** 22–6	1–1	Cleveland Municipal Stadium	61,083	Recap
3	September 17	at **Houston Oilers**	**W** 14–7	2–1	Houston Astrodome	36,077	Recap
4	September 24	Kansas City Chiefs	**W** 35–17	3–1	Cleveland Municipal Stadium	74,280	Recap
5	October 2	Buffalo Bills	**L** 19–22	3–2	Cleveland Municipal Stadium	76,211	Recap
6	October 8	at Detroit Lions	**L** 20–38	3–3	Pontiac Silverdome	74,171	Recap
7	Bye						
8	October 22	**Jacksonville Jaguars**	**L** 15–23	3–4	Cleveland Municipal Stadium	64,405	Recap
9	October 29	at **Cincinnati Bengals**	**W** 29–26 (OT)	4–4	Riverfront Stadium	58,639	Recap
10	November 5	**Houston Oilers**	**L** 10–37	4–5	Cleveland Municipal Stadium	57,881	Recap
11	November 13	at **Pittsburgh Steelers**	**L** 3–20	4–6	Three Rivers Stadium	58,675	Recap
12	November 19	Green Bay Packers	**L** 20–31	4–7	Cleveland Municipal Stadium	55,388	Recap
13	November 26	**Pittsburgh Steelers**	**L** 17–20	4–8	Cleveland Municipal Stadium	67,269	Recap
14	December 3	at San Diego Chargers	**L** 13–31	4–9	Jack Murphy Stadium	56,358	Recap
15	December 9	at Minnesota Vikings	**L** 11–27	4–10	Hubert H. Humphrey Metrodome	47,984	Recap
16	December 17	**Cincinnati Bengals**	**W** 26–10	5–10	Cleveland Municipal Stadium	55,875	Recap
17	December 24	at **Jacksonville Jaguars**	**L** 21–24	5–11	Jacksonville Municipal Stadium	66,007	Recap
Note: Intra-division opponents are in **bold** text.

=== Season summary ===
==== Week 16 vs. Cincinnati Bengals ====
Week 16: Cincinnati Bengals at Cleveland Browns

Quarter	1	2	3	4	Total
Bengals	0	3	0	7	**10**
**Browns**	0	17	6	3	**26**

at Cleveland Municipal Stadium, Cleveland, Ohio

- Date: December 17
- Game time: 1:00 p.m. EST
- Game weather: Overcast, 29 °F (−2 °C)
- Game attendance: 55,875
- TV announcers (NBC): Charlie Jones, Randy Cross and Jim Gray

Game information

**First quarter**

- No scoring plays

**Second quarter**

- CLE – Frank Hartley 1-yard pass from Vinny Testaverde (Matt Stover kick), 14:55. Browns 7–0.
- CIN – Doug Pelfrey 30-yard field goal, 11:10. Browns 7–3.
- CLE – Matt Stover 37-yard field goal, 7:17. Browns 10–3.
- CLE – Keenan McCardell 16-yard pass from Vinny Testaverde (Matt Stover kick), 0:19. Browns 17–3.

**Third quarter**

- CLE – Matt Stover 42-yard field goal, 11:15. Browns 20–3.
- CLE – Matt Stover 19-yard field goal, 7:03. Browns 23–3.

**Fourth quarter**

- CLE – Matt Stover 35-yard field goal, 10:03. Browns 26–3.
- CIN – Eric Bieniemy 1-yard run (Doug Pelfrey kick), 6:51. Browns 26–10.

Top passers

- CIN – Jeff Blake – 22/46, 257 yards, INT
- CLE – Vinny Testaverde – 22/23, 241 yards, 2 TD

Top rushers

- CIN – Harold Green – 7 rushes, 33 yards
- CLE – Earnest Byner – 31 rushes, 121 yards

Top receivers

- CIN – Carl Pickens – 5 receptions, 90 yards
- CLE – Earnest Byner – 7 receptions, 36 yards

The game marked the final game at Cleveland Stadium and the franchise's final home game until 1999.

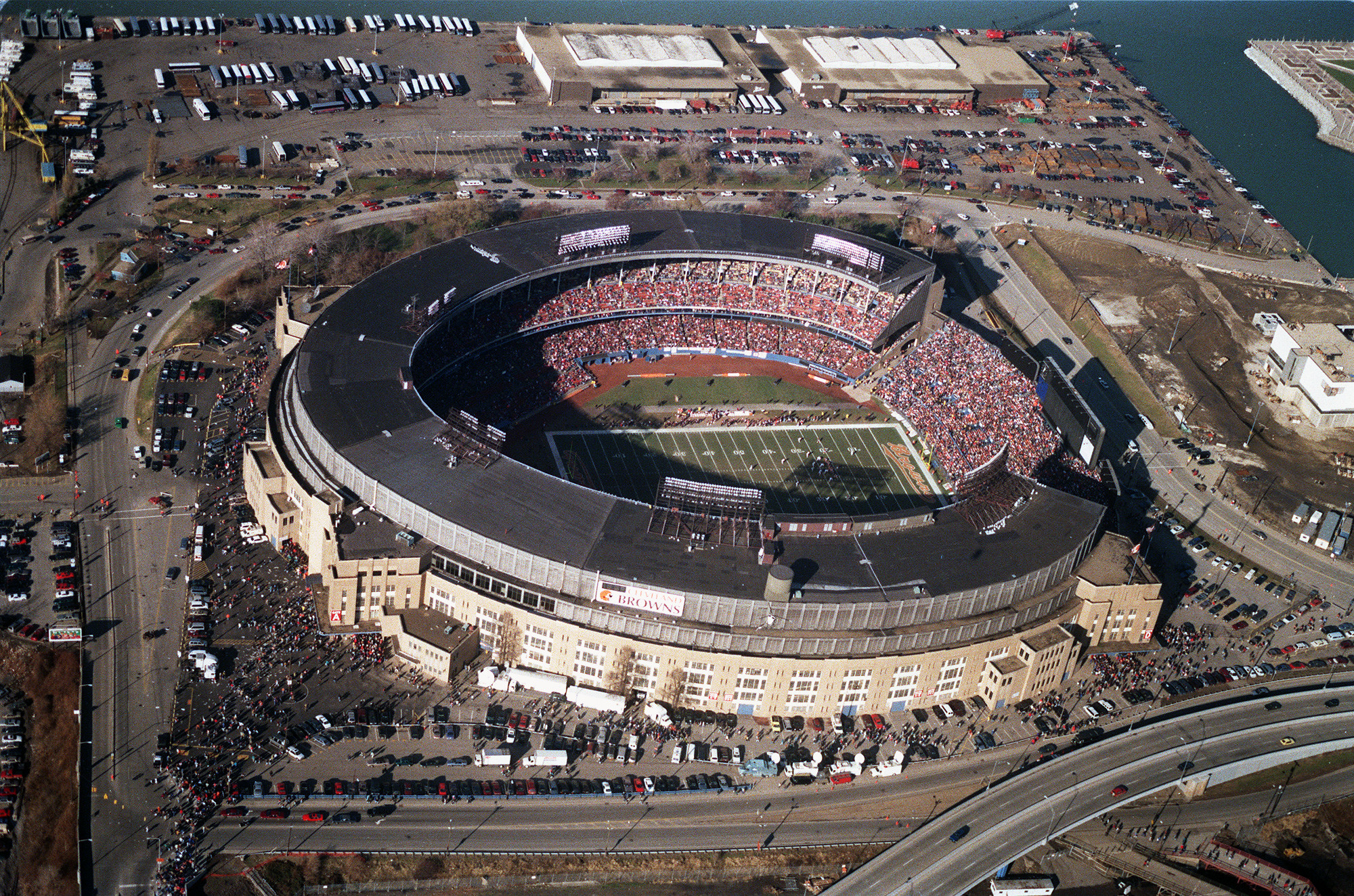
During the last Browns game played in the stadium, December 17, 1995, against the Cincinnati Bengals.

=== Standings ===
AFC Central
	W	L	T	PCT	PF	PA	STK
^{(2)} Pittsburgh Steelers	11	5	0	.688	407	327	L1
Cincinnati Bengals	7	9	0	.438	349	374	W1
Houston Oilers	7	9	0	.438	348	324	W2
Cleveland Browns	5	11	0	.313	289	356	L1
Jacksonville Jaguars	4	12	0	.250	275	404	W1

== Relocation to Baltimore ==
Modell announced on November 6, 1995, that he had signed a deal to relocate the Browns to Baltimore in 1996—a move which would return the NFL to Baltimore for the first time since the Baltimore Colts relocated to Indianapolis after the 1983 season. The very next day, on November 7, 1995, Cleveland voters overwhelmingly approved an issue that had been placed on the ballot at Modell's request, which provided $175 million through a 10-year extension of the existing sin tax to refurbish the outmoded and declining Cleveland Stadium.

After the move was announced, protests were held in Cleveland and even at Browns away games, and several lawsuits were filed, including a breach of contract by the city, which would have required the Browns to remain at the stadium until the end of the 1998 season. A compromise was reached in early February 1996. Modell was granted permission by the league to move the team, but only personnel. The Browns franchise, including its history, colors, logos, and other intellectual property, remained in Cleveland and the NFL officially regards the franchise as suspended for the 1996, 1997, and 1998 seasons. Modell's organization, later named the Baltimore Ravens, is officially regarded as a 1996 expansion team. The NFL agreed to revive the Browns no later than the 1999 season, by way of an expansion draft or another team relocating. The city of Cleveland agreed to drop its lawsuits and build a new stadium by 1999, funded by the sin tax passed to renovate Cleveland Stadium.

The old stadium was demolished in late 1996 and early 1997 and Cleveland Browns Stadium (now known as Huntington Bank Field) was built on the same site, opening in August 1999. While multiple teams threatened to move to Cleveland or were mentioned as considering it, the league chose in 1998 to return the team via an expansion draft and the team resumed play in 1999.
