= 1996 Baltimore Ravens season =

NFL team season

- Owner: Art Modell
- Head coach: Ted Marchibroda
- Defensive coordinator: Marvin Lewis
- Home stadium: Memorial Stadium

Results
- Record: 4–12
- Division place: 5th AFC Central
- Playoffs: Did not qualify
- Pro Bowlers: QB Vinny Testaverde; FS Eric Turner

The 1996 season was the Baltimore Ravens' inaugural season in the National Football League. They played their home games at Memorial Stadium in Baltimore, Maryland. The Ravens were officially a new franchise, but they retained a large portion of the roster of the 1995 Cleveland Browns team, as well as front office staff and some members of the coaching staff. Due to technically, but not officially, being the previous season's Browns team under a new name, they did not receive the number 1 overall draft selection or have an expansion draft as a true expansion franchise would.

Baltimore had remained without an NFL football franchise for 12 years after the Baltimore Colts relocated to Indianapolis, Indiana. In 1996, however, the NFL approved Cleveland Browns owner Art Modell's proposal to relocate the existing Browns organization to Baltimore, although the records and name of the Browns would remain in Cleveland, Ohio and the Baltimore franchise would officially be an expansion franchise. After Modell established the franchise in Baltimore, the team was named the "Baltimore Ravens" via a poll conducted by The Baltimore Sun. Because the Browns were temporarily deactivated under the terms of the settlement (they resumed play in 1999), the Ravens assumed the Browns' place in the American Football Conference (AFC) Central Division. More than 50,000 season tickets were sold.

Modell decided not to retain 1995 Browns coach Bill Belichick, who was fired. He instead hired former Baltimore Colts coach Ted Marchibroda. Marchibroda had previously been in his second stint coaching the Colts, guiding them to the 1995 AFC Championship Game, but could not come to terms on a contract extension in Indianapolis. Modell came to terms with Marchibroda only six days after he left the Colts organization to bring him back to Baltimore.

As an organization, the Ravens failed to improve on the 1995 Browns' 5–11 record, finishing their first season with a 4–12 record under Marchibroda. At the Ravens’ first-ever regular season game, a then-record attendance of 64,124 was present in their win against the Oakland Raiders, 19–14, on September 1 at home. This win made them the first team since the 1961 Minnesota Vikings to win their inaugural game. Their second victory came in Week 5, against the New Orleans Saints at home, in which they became 2–2. In Week 7, the Ravens traveled to Indianapolis to play Baltimore's (and Marchibroda's) previous team. They, however, lost 26–21 and fell to 2–4. Their only other two victories were recorded at home in Week 9 against the St. Louis Rams and Week 14 against the Steelers.

Although not a winning season, quarterback Vinny Testaverde and safety Eric Turner were voted into the Pro Bowl, and wide receivers Michael Jackson and Derrick Alexander became the fourth receiving duo to surpass the 1,000-yard receiving mark. The Ravens held second-half leads in ten of their final eleven games; they ultimately went 3–7 in games decided by one possession.

Michael Jackson's 1,201 receiving yards is 2nd in franchise history after Mark Andrews in 2021, and his 14 touchdown receptions still stands as a franchise single-season record.

== Offseason ==
Prior to the season, the Ravens hired several coaches, including head coach Ted Marchibroda and defensive coordinator Marvin Lewis. Offensive guard Jeff Blackshear was acquired for a future 4th round draft pick. The Ravens traded 3rd, 4th, and 7th round draft picks for the Broncos’ second round selection (#55 overall).

=== NFL draft ===
1996 Baltimore Ravens draft
Round	Pick	Player	Position	College	Notes
1	4	Jonathan Ogden * ^{†}	Offensive tackle	UCLA	
1	26	Ray Lewis * ^{†}	Linebacker	Miami (FL)	
2	55	DeRon Jenkins	Cornerback	Tennessee	
5	153	Jermaine Lewis *	Wide receiver	Maryland	
6	172	Dexter Daniels	Linebacker	Florida	
6	186	James Roe	Wide receiver	Norfolk State	
7	238	Jon Stark	Quarterback	Trinity International	
Made roster † Pro Football Hall of Fame * Made at least one Pro Bowl during career

== Personnel ==
=== Staff / Coaches ===
1996 Baltimore Ravens staff
Front office: Owner and president – Art Modell; Director of football operations – Ozzie Newsome; Director of college scouting – Phil Savage; Pro personnel coordinator – Scott Pioli; Head coaches: Head coach – Ted Marchibroda; Assistant head coach/offense – Kirk Ferentz; Offensive coaches: Quarterbacks – Don Strock; Running backs – Al Lavan; Wide receivers – Mike Sheppard; Tight ends – Pat Hill; Quality control/offense – Eric Mangini	Defensive coaches: Defensive coordinator – Marvin Lewis; Defensive line – Jacob Burney; Linebackers – Maxie Baughan; Defensive backs – Alvin Reynolds; Quality control/defense – Jim Schwartz; Special teams coaches: Special teams – Scott O'Brien; Quality control/special teams – John Settle; Strength and conditioning: Strength and conditioning – Jerry Simmons

=== Roster ===
1996 Baltimore Ravens roster
Quarterbacks (QB): 6 Scott Otis; 12 Vinny Testaverde; 10 Eric Zeier; Running backs (RB): 23 Randy Baldwin; 21 Earnest Byner; 35 Carwell Gardner FB; 33 Bam Morris; Wide receivers (WR): 82 Derrick Alexander; 85 Ray Ethridge; 81 Michael Jackson; 84 Jermaine Lewis; 83 James Roe; 87 Floyd Turner; Tight ends (TE): 86 Eric Green; 48 Frank Hartley; 88 Brian Kinchen LS	Offensive linemen (OL): 70 Herman Arvie T; 69 Jeff Blackshear G; 77 Orlando Brown T; 61 Steve Everitt C; 64 Sale Isaia G; 66 Tony Jones T; 67 Quentin Neujahr C; 75 Jonathan Ogden G; 63 Wally Williams C; Defensive linemen (DL): 90 Rob Burnett DE; 78 Dan Footman DT; 91 Elliott Fortune DE; 94 Mike Frederick DT; 73 Tim Goad DT; 97 James Jones DT; 95 Rick Lyle DE; 98 Anthony Pleasant DE	Linebackers (LB): 56 Mike Caldwell OLB; 55 Sedric Clark OLB; 51 Mike Croel OLB; 53 Dexter Daniels ILB; 50 Keith Goganious OLB; 52 Ray Lewis MLB; 59 Craig Powell OLB; 54 Eddie Sutter ILB; 57 Jerrol Williams OLB; Defensive backs (DB): 43 Vashone Adams FS; 24 Donny Brady CB; 22 Dorian Brew CB; 36 Corey Dowden CB; 25 DeRon Jenkins CB; 38 Antonio Langham CB; 27 Stevon Moore SS; 37 Bennie Thompson SS; 29 Eric Turner FS; Special teams (ST): 9 Greg Montgomery P; 3 Matt Stover K	Practice squad: 71 Spencer Folau T; 89 A. J. Ofodile TE; -- Richard Thomas RB; -- Larry Williams DT; Reserve: -- Jon Stark QB (PUP); 53 active, 1 inactive, 4 practice squad Rookies in italics

== Preseason ==
=== Schedule ===
Week	Date	Opponent	Result	Record	Venue
1	August 3	Philadelphia Eagles	W 17–9	1–0	Memorial Stadium
2	August 10	at New York Giants	W 37–27	2–0	Giants Stadium
3	August 17	Green Bay Packers	L 15–17	2–1	Memorial Stadium
4	August 23	at Buffalo Bills	W 37–14	3–1	Rich Stadium

== Regular season ==
=== Schedule ===
Week	Date	Opponent	Result	Record	Venue	Attendance
1	September 1	Oakland Raiders	**W** 19–14	1–0	Memorial Stadium	64,124
2	September 8	at **Pittsburgh Steelers**	**L** 17–31	1–1	Three Rivers Stadium	57,241
3	September 15	at **Houston Oilers**	**L** 13–29	1–2	Astrodome	20,082
4	Bye					
5	September 29	New Orleans Saints	**W** 17–10	2–2	Memorial Stadium	61,063
6	October 6	New England Patriots	**L** 38–46	2–3	Memorial Stadium	63,569
7	October 13	at Indianapolis Colts	**L** 21–26	2–4	RCA Dome	56,978
8	October 20	at Denver Broncos	**L** 34–45	2–5	Mile High Stadium	70,453
9	October 27	St. Louis Rams	**W** 37–31 (OT)	3–5	Memorial Stadium	60,256
10	November 3	**Cincinnati Bengals**	**L** 21–24	3–6	Memorial Stadium	60,743
11	November 10	at **Jacksonville Jaguars**	**L** 27–30	3–7	Jacksonville Municipal Stadium	64,628
12	November 17	at San Francisco 49ers	**L** 20–38	3–8	3Com Park	51,596
13	November 24	**Jacksonville Jaguars**	**L** 25–28 (OT)	3–9	Memorial Stadium	57,384
14	December 1	**Pittsburgh Steelers**	**W** 31–17	4–9	Memorial Stadium	51,822
15	December 8	at **Cincinnati Bengals**	**L** 14–21	4–10	Riverfront Stadium	43,022
16	December 15	at Carolina Panthers	**L** 16–27	4–11	Ericcson Stadium	70,075
17	December 22	**Houston Oilers**	**L** 21–24	4–12	Memorial Stadium	52,704
Note: Intra-division opponents are in **bold** text.

=== Game summaries ===
==== Week 1: vs Oakland Raiders ====
Week 1: Oakland Raiders at Baltimore Ravens

Quarter	1	2	3	4	Total
Raiders	0	14	0	0	**14**
**Ravens**	7	0	6	6	**19**

at Memorial Stadium, Baltimore, Maryland

- Date: September 1, 1996
- Game time: 1:00 p.m. EST
- Game weather: Overcast, 71 °F (22 °C)
- Game attendance: 64,124
- TV announcers (NBC): Tom Hammond, Bob Trumpy

Game information

**First quarter**

**Second quarter**

**Third quarter**

**Fourth quarter**

Top passers

- OAK – Billy Joe Hobert – 17/26, 192 yards, 2 TD, 2 INT
- BAL – Vinny Testaverde – 19/33, 254 yards

Top rushers

- OAK – Harvey Williams – 13 rushes, 39 yards
- BAL – Earnest Byner – 14 rushes, 43 yards, TD

Top receivers

- OAK – James Jett – 4 receptions, 65 yards
- BAL – Michael Jackson – 3 receptions, 60 yards

==== Week 3: at Houston Oilers ====
Week Three: Baltimore Ravens at Houston Oilers – Game summary

Quarter	1	2	3	4	Total
Ravens	0	7	0	6	**13**
**Oilers**	14	3	9	3	**29**

at Astrodome, Houston, Texas

- Date: September 15
- Game time: 1:00 p.m. EST/12:00 p.m. CDT
- Game weather: None (indoor stadium)
- Game attendance: 20,082
- TV announcers (NBC): Dan Hicks and Bart Oates (blacked out locally)
- Box score

Game information

**Top passers**

- HOU – Frank Wycheck 3-yard pass from Chris Chandler (Al Del Greco kick). Oilers 7–0.
- HOU – Willie Davis 18-yard pass from Chris Chandler (Al Del Greco kick). Oilers 14–0.

**Second quarter**

- BAL – Michael Jackson 7-yard pass from Vinny Testaverde (Matt Stover kick). Oilers 14–7.
- HOU – Al Del Greco 41-yard field goal. Oilers 17–7.

**Third quarter**

- HOU – Greg Montgomery run out of own end zone. Oilers 19–7.
- HOU – Ronnie Harmon 2-yard run (Al Del Greco kick). Oilers 26–7.

**Fourth quarter**

- HOU – Al Del Greco 44-yard field goal. Oilers 29–7.
- BAL – Herman Arvie 1-yard pass from Vinny Testaverde (pass failed). Oilers 29–13.

**Top passers**

- BAL – Vinny Testaverde – 25/40, 217 yards, 2 TD, 3 INT
- HOU – Chris Chandler – 16/27, 162 yards, 2 TD

**Top rushers**

- BAL – Earnest Byner – 19 rushes, 68 yards
- HOU – Eddie George – 17 rushes, 74 yards

**Top receivers**

- BAL – Michael Jackson – 6 receptions, 86 yards, TD
- HOU – Frank Wycheck – 6 receptions, 64 yards, TD

=== Standings ===
AFC Central
	W	L	T	PCT	PF	PA	STK
^{(3)} Pittsburgh Steelers	10	6	0	.625	344	257	L2
^{(5)} Jacksonville Jaguars	9	7	0	.563	325	335	W5
Cincinnati Bengals	8	8	0	.500	372	369	W3
Houston Oilers	8	8	0	.500	345	319	W1
Baltimore Ravens	4	12	0	.250	371	441	L3
