= Flip or Flop Nashville =

American reality television series

- Genre: Reality television
- Country of origin: United States
- Original language: English
- No. of seasons: 2
- No. of episodes: 21

Production
- Running time: 30 minutes

Original release
- Network: HGTV
- Release: January 18, 2018 – March 21, 2019

Related
- Flip or Flop (franchise)

Flip or Flop Nashville is a television series that aired on HGTV hosted by real estate agents DeRon Jenkins and Page Turner. It is a spin-off of the HGTV series Flip or Flop. It premiered on January 18, 2018 and is set in Nashville, Tennessee.

== Premise ==
On March 1, 2017, HGTV announced "Flip or Flop" will expand to Nashville, Tennessee. The show featured a new couple, DeRon Jenkins and Page Turner, flipping houses in Nashville, Tennessee. DeRon Jenkins and Page Turner had the same roles as Tarek and Christina in this show.

== Hosts ==
DeRon Jenkins is a licensed contractor and Page Turner is a seasoned real estate agent. They find the worst properties in Nashville and transform them into stylish and functional family homes. During the opening of the show they introduce themselves as exes and say that although they didn't ‘work together’ (as a married couple), they still work together.

== Episodes ==
=== Season 1 ===
No. overall	No. in season	Title	Original air date	Cost of home ($)	Closing cost ($)	Rehab cost ($)	Sale price ($)	Profit/loss ($)
1	1	"Breaking Brick"	January 18, 2018	TBA	TBA	TBA	TBA	TBA
Flip location: Nashville, Tennessee
2	2	"Biggest Little House in Nashville"	January 25, 2018	110,000	20,000	50,000	249,900	69,900
Flip location: Nashville, Tennessee
3	3	"Hot in Nashville"	February 1, 2018	170,000	N/A	52,500	284,900	62,400
Flip location: Nashville, Tennessee
4	4	"The Cluttered Cottage"	February 8, 2018	65,000	11,500	28,450	160,000	50,050
Flip location: Nashville, Tennessee
5	5	"All Hands on Deck"	February 8, 2018	240,000	20,000	35,500	349,900	54,400
Flip location: Nashville, Tennessee
6	6	"Monster House"	February 15, 2018	190,000	20,000	75,000	324,900	39,900
Flip location: Inglewood, Tennessee
7	7	"Hold the Door"	February 22, 2018	180,000	20,000	65,600	319,900	54,300
Flip location: Donelson, Tennessee
8	8	"Low Wattage Cottage"	March 1, 2018	166,000	20,000	73,000	294,900	35,900
Flip location: Inglewood, Tennessee
9	9	"Downsize to Maximize"	March 8, 2018	145,000	20,000	55,000	N/A	-220,000
Flip location: Nashville, Tennessee; Note: Unsold with a list price of 274,900

=== Season 2 ===
No. overall	No. in season	Title	Original air date	Cost of home ($)	Closing cost ($)	Rehab cost ($)	Sale price ($)	Profit/loss ($)
10	1	"Holy Floors, DeRon!"	January 3, 2019	115,000	10,000	74,000	274,000	75,000
Flip location:
11	2	"Termite Terrace"	January 10, 2019	150,000	10,000	52,500	290,000	77,500
Flip location:
12	3	"The Dragon in the Basement"	January 17, 2019	215,000	10,000	95,000	354,900	34,900
Flip location:
13	4	"The Riddle of the Bonus Room"	January 24, 2019	262,000	10,000	62,000	Did not sell	Unknown
Flip location:
14	5	"The Abandoned Rehab"	January 31, 2019	165,000	10,000	90,000	385,000	120,000
Flip location:
15	6	"Frankenhouse"	February 7, 2019	195,000	10,000	120,000	419,900	94,900
Flip location:
16	7	"Raise the Roof"	February 14, 2019	185,000	10,000	78,000	325,000	52,000
Flip location:
17	8	"Basement or Bust"	February 21, 2019	195,000	10,000	75,000	360,000	80,000
Flip location:
18	9	"The Renovation Shuffle"	February 28, 2019	165,000	10,000	119,000	374,900	80,900
Flip location:
19	10	"Colonial Critters"	March 7, 2019	125,000	10,000	61,400	259,900	63,500
Flip location:
20	11	"Fire in the Hole"	March 14, 2019	80,000	10,000	65,000	205,000	50,000
Flip location:
21	12	"There's No Crying in Flipping"	March 21, 2019	220,000	10,000	180,000	425,000	15,000
Flip location:
