= Dexter Daniels (American football) =

American football player (born 1973)

No. 48
- Position: Linebacker

Personal information
- Born: December 8, 1973 (age 52); Valdosta, Georgia, U.S.
- Listed height: 6 ft 1 in (1.85 m)
- Listed weight: 241 lb (109 kg)

Career information
- High school: Valdosta
- College: Florida
- NFL draft: 1996: 6th round, 172nd overall pick

Career history
- Baltimore Ravens (1996)

Awards and highlights
- First-team All-SEC (1995); Second-team All-SEC (1994)
- Stats at Pro Football Reference

Dexter Lavista Daniels (December 8, 1973) is an American former professional football player who was a linebacker for one season with the Baltimore Ravens of the National Football League (NFL) in 1996. Daniels played college football for the Florida Gators, and thereafter, he played in the NFL for the Ravens.

== Early life ==
Daniels was born in Valdosta, Georgia, in 1973. He attended Valdosta High School, where he played high school football for the Valdosta Wildcats and was named USA Today Defensive High School Player of the Year in 1991.

== College career ==
Daniels accepted an athletic scholarship to attend the University of Florida in Gainesville, Florida, and he played for the Gators under coach Steve Spurrier from 1992 to 1995. The Gators won Southeastern Conference (SEC) championships in 1993 and 1994, and finished the 1995 regular season as the 12–0 SEC champions, but were ultimately defeated 62–24 by the Nebraska Cornhuskers in the Fiesta Bowl for the Bowl Alliance national championship. Daniels was a first-team All-SEC selection after his senior season in 1995.

Daniels graduated from the University of Florida with a bachelor's degree in criminal justice in 1997.

== Professional career ==
The Baltimore Ravens selected Daniels in the sixth round (172nd pick overall) of the 1996 NFL draft. He played in four games for the Ravens during their inaugural 1996 season in Baltimore.

== See also ==
- Florida Gators
- Florida Gators football, 1990–99
- History of the Baltimore Ravens
- List of Florida Gators in the NFL draft
- List of University of Florida alumni
