= DeRon Jenkins =

American football player (born 1973)

No. 25, 23
- Position: Cornerback

Personal information
- Born: November 14, 1973 (age 52); St. Louis, Missouri, U.S.
- Listed height: 5 ft 11 in (1.80 m)
- Listed weight: 192 lb (87 kg)

Career information
- High school: Ritenour (Breckenridge Hills, Missouri)
- College: Tennessee
- NFL draft: 1996: 2nd round, 55th overall pick

Career history
- Baltimore Ravens (1996–1999); San Diego Chargers (2000); Tennessee Titans (2001); Carolina Panthers (2002)*; Austin Wranglers (2004); Nashville Kats (2005–2006)
- * Offseason or practice squad member only

Awards and highlights
- Arena Football League All-Rookie Team (2004); First-team All-SEC (1995)

Career NFL statistics
- Tackles: 287
- Interceptions: 3
- Sacks: 1
- Stats at Pro Football Reference

Career AFL statistics
- Tackles: 138
- Interceptions: 6
- Touchdowns: 1
- Stats at ArenaFan.com

DeRon Charles Jenkins (born November 14, 1973) is an American former professional football player who was a cornerback in the National Football League (NFL) and Arena Football League (AFL). He played college football for the Tennessee Volunteers and was selected by the Baltimore Ravens in the second round of the 1996 NFL draft. Jenkins also played for the San Diego Chargers, Tennessee Titans, Austin Wranglers and Nashville Kats. He is currently a co-host of HGTV's Flip or Flop Nashville.

== College career ==
Jenkins attended and played college football at the University of Tennessee.

== Professional career ==
=== Baltimore Ravens ===
Jenkins was selected by the Baltimore Ravens in the second round of the 1996 NFL draft. He spent four years for the Ravens starting 30 of 63 games, recording 202 tackles, two interceptions and a sack.

=== San Diego Chargers ===
Before the 2000 season, Jenkins signed with the San Diego Chargers. He spent one season with the Chargers starting 14 of 15 games, recording 55 tackles and one interception.

=== Tennessee Titans ===
After a year in San Diego Jenkins signed with the Tennessee Titans for the 2001 season. During his only year with the Titans he started 6 of 15 games and recorded 41 tackles.

=== Carolina Panthers ===
On March 18, 2002, Jenkins signed with the Carolina Panthers. He was released on September 1.

=== Austin Wranglers ===
After spending three years out of football he signed with the Austin Wranglers of the Arena Football League in 2004. He spent one season for the Wranglers, recording 54 tackles and two interceptions.

=== Nashville Kats ===
Before the 2005 season, Jenkins signed with the Nashville Kats. He spent two seasons with the Kats recording 84 tackles and four interceptions.

== NFL career statistics ==
Legend
**Bold**	Career high

Year	Team	Games		Tackles				Interceptions				Fumbles			
Year	Team	GP	GS	Comb	Solo	Ast	Sck	Int	Yds	TD	Lng	FF	FR	Yds	TD
1996	BAL	15	2	28	25	3	0.0	0	0	0	0	0	**1**	0	0
1997	BAL	16	6	44	42	2	0.0	**1**	15	0	15	0	**1**	0	0
1998	BAL	16	7	56	53	3	0.0	**1**	0	0	0	0	**1**	0	0
1999	BAL	16	15	**63**	**60**	3	**1.0**	0	0	0	0	**2**	0	0	0
2000	SDG	15	14	55	50	**5**	0.0	**1**	**16**	0	**16**	0	0	0	0
2001	TEN	15	6	41	37	4	0.0	0	0	0	0	1	0	0	0
		93	50	287	267	20	1.0	3	31	0	16	3	3	0	0

== Post-football ==
Jenkins is a licensed general contractor who has been renovating houses throughout Nashville and Atlanta. He is a co-host with real estate broker Page Turner on HGTV's Flip or Flop Nashville which premiered in January 2018.
