= Earnest Hunter =

American football player (born 1970)

No. 23, 32
- Position: Running back

Personal information
- Born: December 21, 1970 (age 55); Longview, Texas, U.S.
- Listed height: 5 ft 8 in (1.73 m)
- Listed weight: 201 lb (91 kg)

Career information
- High school: Longview
- College: Southeastern Oklahoma State
- NFL draft: 1995: undrafted

Career history
- Cleveland Browns (1995); Baltimore Ravens (1996); New Orleans Saints (1996); Barcelona Dragons (1998); Oklahoma Crude (2002)

Career NFL statistics
- Rush attempts: 45
- Rushing yards: 144
- Receptions: 23
- Receiving yards: 205
- Kick returns: 33
- Kick return yards: 706
- Stats at Pro Football Reference

Earnest Hunter III (born December 21, 1970) is an American former professional football player who was a running back in the National Football League (NFL). He played college football for the Southeastern Oklahoma State Storm. He was signed as an undrafted free agent by the Cleveland Browns.

== College career ==
Hunter originally attended Navarro College from 1991 to 1992 before transferring to Southeastern Oklahoma State University, where he set the Oklahoma Intercollegiate Conference records for rushing yards (1,899) and touchdowns (16) in 1994.

== Professional career ==
Hunter signed as an undrafted free agent with the Cleveland Browns in 1995. As a rookie, he appeared in 10 games, rushing the ball 30 times for 100 yards catching five passes for 42 yards. He also returned 23 kickoffs for 508 yards as well as 3 punts for 40 yards. He also fumbled four times. In 1996, he started the season with the newly relocated Baltimore Ravens appearing in five games, rushing the ball one time for no yards and catching one pass for 25 yards. He also returned nine kickoffs for 178 yards and also two fumbles. He finished the season with the New Orleans Saints appearing in six games rushing the ball 14 times for 44 yards, catching 17 pass for 138 yards. He also attempted one pass. He returned one kickoff for 20 yards and fumbled twice more for the 1996 season.

In 1998, Hunter joined the Barcelona Dragons of NFL Europe. On the season, he appeared in 10 games, rushing the ball 87 times for 304 yards and two touchdowns. His yardage total was good for ninth in the league. He also caught 22 passes for 134 yards. He returned to professional football in 2002, playing for the Oklahoma Crude of the National Indoor Football League.

== Personal life ==
Hunter's father died when he was seven years old. His mother then began working multiple jobs to help support their family. Hunter became a father while attending Longview High School. He now teaches at Winona Isd Highschool and Winona Isd Middle School as a PE teacher and a Football and basketball coach. Hunter now works as a study hall teacher at The Brook Hill School in Bullard Texas.
