= Pulu Poumele =

American football player and coach (1972–2016)

No. 51
- Position: Offensive tackle

Personal information
- Born: January 31, 1972; Oceanside, California, U.S.
- Died: June 4, 2016 (aged 44); Oceanside, California, U.S.
- Listed height: 6 ft 3 in (1.91 m)
- Listed weight: 300 lb (136 kg)

Career information
- High school: Oceanside
- College: Arizona
- NFL draft: 1995: undrafted

Career history

Playing
- Cleveland Browns (1995)*; Baltimore Ravens (1996)*; San Diego Chargers (1997); Toronto Argonauts (1998–1999)
- * Offseason or practice squad member only

Coaching
- San Marcos; El Camino

Pulu Talo Poumele (January 31, 1972 – June 4, 2016) was an American football coach and offensive tackle who played in both the National Football League (NFL) and Canadian Football League (CFL).

== Early and personal life ==
Born in Oceanside, California, Poumele attended Oceanside High School.

== Playing career ==
Poumele played college football at the University of Arizona, before playing in the NFL with the Cleveland Browns, Baltimore Ravens and San Diego Chargers, and in the CFL with the Toronto Argonauts.

== Coaching career ==
Poumele was the head coach at San Marcos in 2009, the head coach at El Camino for four seasons, and he later worked at Oceanside High School as a special education teacher and the defensive coordinator for the football team.

== Personal life ==
Poumele was married with five children. His cousin was Junior Seau. On June 4, 2016, after playing basketball, Poumele went into cardiac arrest and died at a 24 Hour Fitness in Oceanside.
