= Michael Jackson (wide receiver) =

American football player (1969–2017)

No. 1, 81
- Position: Wide receiver

Personal information
- Born: April 12, 1969; Tangipahoa, Louisiana, U.S.
- Died: May 12, 2017 (aged 48); Tangipahoa, Louisiana, U.S.
- Listed height: 6 ft 4 in (1.93 m)
- Listed weight: 195 lb (88 kg)

Career information
- High school: Kentwood (Kentwood, Louisiana)
- College: Southern Miss (1987–1990)
- NFL draft: 1991: 6th round, 141st overall pick

Career history
- Cleveland Browns (1991–1995); Baltimore Ravens (1996–1998); Seattle Seahawks (1999)*
- * Offseason or practice squad member only

Awards and highlights
- NFL receiving touchdowns co-leader (1996)

Career NFL statistics
- Receptions: 353
- Receiving yards: 5,393
- Receiving touchdowns: 46
- Stats at Pro Football Reference

Michael Dywane Jackson Dyson (April 12, 1969 – May 12, 2017) was an American professional football player who was a wide receiver for eight seasons in the National Football League (NFL) from 1991 to 1998. He played college football for the Southern Miss Golden Eagles. Jackson was selected by the Cleveland Browns in the sixth round of the 1991 NFL draft. He played in the NFL for the Browns and the Baltimore Ravens. Jackson signed a one-year contract with the Seattle Seahawks to play the 1999 season, but was cut at the end of the preseason.

== Career ==
In college, Jackson was teammates with quarterback Brett Favre during the 1989 and 1990 seasons.

He was an immediate contributor for the Cleveland Browns under then head coach Bill Belichick with 3 seasons over 40 catches, 710 yards, and 7 TD. He had a then career-best season in 1993 when he hauled in 41 catches for 756 yards with 8 TD.

Between the first two games of the 1993 regular season, he briefly changed his last name to his father's surname Dyson before reverting to Jackson which was his mother's maiden name. The change of heart was the result of having received letters from youngsters who identified with him by his Jackson name.

In 1996, Jackson was tied with San Diego Chargers wide receiver Tony Martin for most receiving touchdowns in the NFL with 14. He also had career highs with 76 catches and 1,201 yards.

Jackson was a member of Alpha Phi Alpha fraternity. He served as mayor of his hometown, Tangipahoa, Louisiana, from 2009 through 2012.

On August 12, 1999, Jackson signed a one-year contract with the Seattle Seahawks after their star wide receiver Joey Galloway continued his holdout. Jackson played in all four preseason games with the Seahawks, catching a 23-yard touchdown against the Cardinals. Jackson was let go on September 6, 1999, in the preseason cut down to the 53-man roster.

== NFL career statistics ==
Legend
	Led the league
**Bold**	Career high

=== Regular season ===
Year	Team	Games		Receiving				
Year	Team	GP	GS	Rec	Yds	Avg	Lng	TD
1991	CLE	**16**	7	17	268	15.8	65	2
1992	CLE	**16**	14	47	755	16.1	69	7
1993	CLE	15	11	41	756	**18.4**	62	8
1994	CLE	9	7	21	304	14.5	30	2
1995	CLE	13	10	44	714	16.2	70	9
1996	BAL	**16**	**16**	**76**	**1,201**	15.8	**86**	**14**
1997	BAL	**16**	15	69	918	13.3	54	4
1998	BAL	13	12	38	477	12.6	53	0
Career		114	92	353	5,393	15.3	86	46

=== Playoffs ===
Year	Team	Games		Receiving				
Year	Team	GP	GS	Rec	Yds	Avg	Lng	TD
1994	CLE	2	2	10	169	16.9	36	0
Career		2	2	10	169	16.9	36	0

== Death ==
Jackson was killed in a motorcycle accident in the early morning hours of May 12, 2017. He was riding his motorcycle at high speed on US 51 in Tangipahoa, Louisiana when he struck the driver side of a vehicle that was backing out of a driveway. The high impact of the collision also killed the driver of the other vehicle, 20-year-old Destiny Alexus Gordon.
