= History of the Baltimore Ravens =

This article details the history of the Baltimore Ravens, a professional American football team which plays in the National Football League. The Ravens were formed to fill in the void left by Baltimore's previous team, the Colts, who had controversially moved to Indianapolis. Ironically, the Ravens' formation necessitated the relocation of the Cleveland Browns' players and personnel, leaving Cleveland without a team until the Browns resumed operations as an expansion team three years later. Since then, the Ravens have usually featured a strong defense and have won two Super Bowl championships.

== Origins ==
Ahead of the 1995 league expansion, eleven years after the Colts' controversial move to Indianapolis, the city of Baltimore expected to be granted an NFL franchise and put together its most attractive financial package. However, to make way for Jack Kent Cooke's ultimately unsuccessful plan to move the Washington Redskins to Laurel, Maryland, then-commissioner Paul Tagliabue convinced the league's team owners to pass over Baltimore. In 1995, the NFL Expansion Draft saw the creation of the Carolina Panthers and Jacksonville Jaguars, franchises granted to smaller TV markets in Charlotte, North Carolina and Jacksonville, Florida respectively. In response to outrage in Baltimore, including then-governor William Donald Schaefer's threat to announce over the loudspeakers Tagliabue's exact location in Camden Yards any time he attended a Baltimore Orioles game, Tagliabue remarked, "Maybe (Baltimore) can open another museum with that money." Having failed to obtain a franchise via the expansion, the city, despite having "misgivings," turned to the possibility of obtaining an existing franchise, namely the Cleveland Browns, whose then-owner Art Modell was financially struggling and at odds with the city of Cleveland over needed improvements to the team's stadium.

On November 6, 1995, Modell announced his intention to move the team to Baltimore, citing the inadequacy of Cleveland Stadium and the lack of a sufficient replacement along with his heavy debt. Initially, the team was to be known as the "Baltimore Browns." The plan was for the "Baltimore Browns" to play at Memorial Stadium until a new stadium could be built. However, the decision triggered a flurry of legal activity that ended when representatives of Cleveland and the NFL reached a settlement on February 8, 1996. It stipulated that the Browns' name, colors, and history of the franchise were to remain in Cleveland, including past records and the attribution of its Pro Football Hall of Fame players. A reactivated Cleveland Browns team would then begin play in 1999, while Modell's relocated club would technically and legally be a "new franchise," and an expansion team, the Ravens. The NFL teams approved the agreement on February 9, 1996.

The Canadian Football League team, the Baltimore Stallions, had proved such a success and the fans showed up in droves to prove they deserved an NFL franchise. This caught the attention of Modell. Modell's decision to relocate cause hardship for the Stallions, as the team would win the 83rd Grey Cup two weeks later and realizing they could not compete with the incoming franchise, the team relocated to Montreal, Quebec, Canada and became the third incarnation of the Montreal Alouettes.

After relocating his franchise, retaining the current contracts of former Browns players and personnel as per the agreement made by the city of Cleveland and the NFL, owner Art Modell fired Bill Belichick and promptly hired Ted Marchibroda as head coach, who had previous experience with the Baltimore Colts during the 1970s and the Indianapolis Colts during the early 1990s. This in turn made Marchibroda the only man to serve as head coach of both Baltimore's NFL franchises. Ozzie Newsome, the Browns tight end for many seasons, joined Modell in Baltimore as director of football operations. He was later promoted to Vice President/general manager.

Focus groups, a telephone survey, and a fan contest were all held to help select a name for the new franchise. Team management started with a list of 17 names from an original list of more than 100. From there, focus groups of a total of 200 Baltimore area residents reduced the list of names to six, and then a phone survey of 1000 people trimmed it down to three, Marauders, Americans, and Ravens. Finally, a fan contest drawing 33,288 voters picked "Ravens," a name that alludes to the famous poem, The Raven, by Edgar Allan Poe, who spent the early part of his career in Baltimore, and is also buried there. The name was announced on March 29, 1996. Edgar Allan Poe also had distant relatives who played football for the Princeton Tigers in the 1880s through the early 1900s. These brothers were infamous players in the early days of American football.

When Modell moved to Baltimore, the team brought along players such as Anthony Pleasant, Vinny Testaverde, Michael Jackson, Matt Stover, Eric Turner and Rob Burnett.

Due to continual financial hardships, the NFL directed Modell to initiate the sale of his franchise. On March 27, 2000, NFL owners approved the sale of 49% of the Ravens to Steve Bisciotti. In the deal, Bisciotti had an option to purchase the remaining 51% for $325 million in 2004 from Art Modell. On April 9, 2004, the NFL approved Bisciotti's purchase of the majority stake in the club.

== 1996–1998: First years ==
=== 1996: Inaugural season ===
The 1996 season was the inaugural season of the Baltimore Ravens, and the first time a regular season NFL game was hosted at Memorial Stadium in 13 years. They won their first game at home against the Oakland Raiders, but lost the next two against the Pittsburgh Steelers and the Houston Oilers. After their bye week, they beat the New Orleans Saints at home with a score of 17–10, but were not able to beat the New England Patriots in the following game. On October 13 they faced the former team in Baltimore, the Indianapolis Colts, but lost 26–21. Two weeks later they won against the St. Louis Rams in an overtime victory. They were not able to repeat this mostly for the remainder of the season, but managed to win against Pittsburgh in Week 14. They ended their season with a record of 4–12. Even though they did not have a winning season, quarterback Vinny Testaverde was voted into the Pro Bowl, and wide receivers Michael Jackson and Derrick Alexander surpassed the 1,000-yard receiving mark.

=== 1997 ===
In 1997 the team played their final season at Memorial Stadium. They lost their first game at home to the Jacksonville Jaguars by one point, then won the next three games against the Cincinnati Bengals, New York Giants and Tennessee Oilers. They then lost their next two games against the San Diego Chargers and their division rivals, the Steelers. After their bye week, they won only one out of the next four games, and lost one in overtime. On November 19 they played against the Philadelphia Eagles, holding them to a 10–10 tie. They lost their next two games, then won two, and ended the season with a home loss to the Bengals, ending with a record of 6–9–1, the lowest in the AFC Central Division. Peter Boulware, with 11.5 sacks, was named AFC Defensive Rookie of the Year.

=== 1998: New stadium ===
Baltimore began the season by moving into their new stadium Ravens Stadium at Camden Yards (later named to PSINet Stadium, and as of 2003 named M&T Bank Stadium). Testaverde, who had left for the New York Jets, was replaced by Eric Zeier, and later, former Indianapolis Colt Jim Harbaugh . Defensive back Rod Woodson joined the team after a successful stint with the Pittsburgh Steelers, and Priest Holmes started getting the first playing time of his career and ran for 1,000 yards, but the Ravens finished with a 6–10 record. After three consecutive losing seasons, Marchibroda was succeeded by Brian Billick, who had served as the offensive coordinator for the record setting offense of the Minnesota Vikings the season before.

== 1999–2007: Brian Billick era ==
In the 1999 season, with a newly renamed stadium, PSINet Stadium (now M&T Bank Stadium), Baltimore showed a marked improvement. Quarterback Tony Banks came to Baltimore from the St. Louis Rams and had the best season of his career with 17 touchdown passes and an 81.2 pass rating. He was joined by receiver Qadry Ismail, who posted a 1,000-yard season. The Ravens struggled early, starting 3–6; but rattled off four consecutive wins to put themselves in playoff contention. A loss in the final week sent them home early with an 8–8 record.

=== 2000: First Super Bowl championship ===
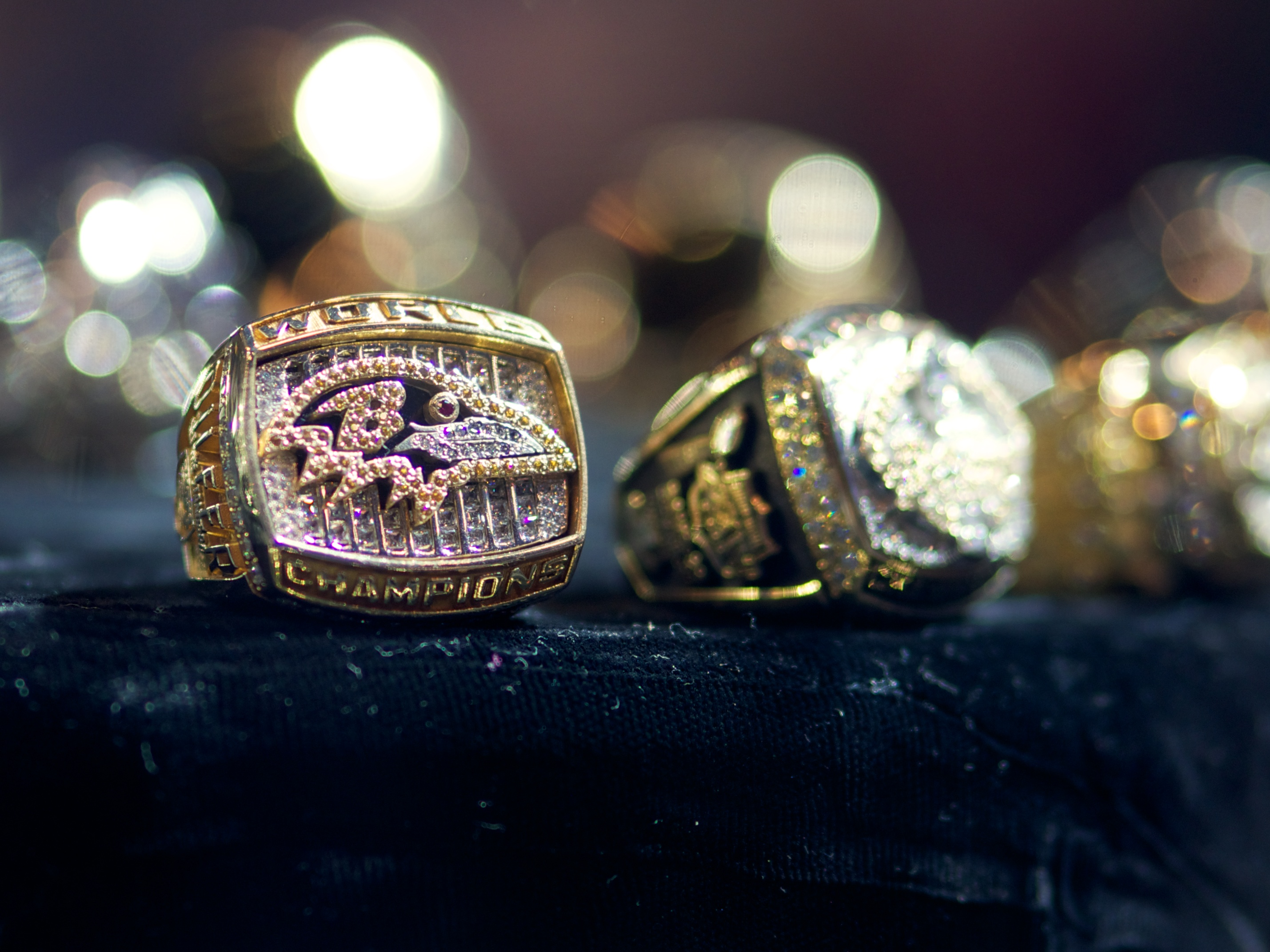
Baltimore Ravens Super Bowl XXXV Ring

The 2000 season saw the Ravens defense, led by defensive coordinator Marvin Lewis, develop into a rock-solid unit that emerged as one of the most formidable defenses in NFL history. The Ravens defense set a new NFL record in holding opposing teams to 165 total points; the feat eclipsed the mark set previously by the Chicago Bears of 187 points for a 16-game season. Linebacker Ray Lewis was named Defensive Player of the year and, with two of his defensive teammates, Sam Adams and Rod Woodson, made the Pro Bowl.

Baltimore's season started strong with a 3–1 record. Tony Banks began the 2000 season as the starting quarterback and was replaced by Trent Dilfer when the Ravens fell to 5–4, and failed to score an offensive touchdown the entire month of October. Coach Brian Billick announced that the change at quarterback would be for the rest of the season. The thousand yard rushing season by rookie running back Jamal Lewis combined with the stout Ravens defense kept Baltimore competitive in games even when the offense struggled. At one point in the season the team played five consecutive games without scoring an offensive touchdown but still managed two wins during that stretch. The team regrouped and won each of their last seven games, finishing 12–4. The Ravens had made the playoffs for the first time.

Since the divisional rival Tennessee Titans had a record of 13–3, Baltimore had to play in the wild card round. In their first ever playoff game, they dominated the Denver Broncos 21–3 in front of a then record-crowd of 69,638 at then called PSINet Stadium. In the divisional playoffs, they went on the road to Tennessee. Tied 10–10 in the fourth quarter, an Al Del Greco field goal attempt was blocked and returned for a touchdown by Anthony Mitchell, and a Ray Lewis interception return for a score put the game squarely in Baltimore's favor. The 24–10 win put the Ravens in the AFC Championship against the Oakland Raiders. Shannon Sharpe's 96-yard touchdown catch early in the second quarter, followed by an injury to Raiders quarterback Rich Gannon, highlighted the Ravens' 16–3 victory.

Baltimore then went to Tampa for Super Bowl XXXV where they met the New York Giants, cruising to a 34–7 win for their first championship in franchise history. The Ravens recorded four sacks, forced five turnovers, one of which was a Kerry Collins interception returned for a touchdown by Duane Starks. The Giants' only score was a Ron Dixon kickoff return for another touchdown (after Starks' interception return), making the 2000 Ravens the third Super Bowl team whose defense did not allow an opponent's offensive score; however, Baltimore immediately countered with a TD return by Jermaine Lewis. The Ravens became only the third wild-card team to win a Super Bowl championship. The interception return for a touchdown, followed by two kick return TDs, marked the quickest time in Super Bowl history that three touchdowns had been scored.

The title made the Ravens the fourth Baltimore-based pro football team to win a league championship. They were preceded by the NFL Baltimore Colts in 1958, 1959 and 1970, the USFL Stars in 1985 and the CFL Stallions in 1995.

=== 2001 ===
In 2001 the Ravens attempted to defend their title with a new quarterback, Elvis Grbac, but an injury to Jamal Lewis and poor offensive performance stymied the team. After a 3–3 start, the Ravens defeated the Minnesota Vikings in the final week to clinch a wild card berth at 10–6. In the first round the Ravens showed flashes of their previous year with a 20–3 blowout over the Miami Dolphins, in which the team forced three turnovers and outgained the Dolphins 347 yards to 151. In the divisional playoff the Ravens played the Pittsburgh Steelers. Three interceptions by Grbac ended the Ravens' season, as they lost 27–10.

=== 2002: Salary cap problems and player removals ===
Baltimore ran into salary cap problems in 2002 and was forced to cut several players, including Sam Adams, Rod Woodson and Shannon Sharpe. The Ravens replaced Woodson by drafting safety Ed Reed in the first round. Longtime backup QB Chris Redman took over behind center. The Ravens stayed somewhat competitive, before a December slide cost them a playoff spot with a 7–9 final record.

=== 2003 ===
The Ravens needed a quarterback but drafting after all the top quarterbacks were gone, used their 10th pick to select Arizona State defensive end Terrell Suggs. They then traded their 2003 2nd round pick and 2004 1st round pick to the New England Patriots for the 19th overall selection which they used to draft Cal quarterback Kyle Boller. The Patriots eventually used the Ravens' 2004 1st round selection to take defensive tackle Vince Wilfork.

The Ravens named Boller their starting QB just prior to the start of the 2003 season, but he was injured midway through the season and was replaced by Anthony Wright. The Ravens held a 5–5 record until, in a home game against the Seattle Seahawks, they wiped out a 41–24 gap in the final seven minutes of regulation, then won on a Matt Stover field goal in overtime for a 44–41 triumph. From there the Ravens won five of their last six games. With a 10–6 record, Baltimore won their first AFC North division title. Running back Jamal Lewis ran for 2,066 yards on the season, including a then NFL single-game record of 295 yards at home against the Cleveland Browns on September 14. In doing so, Lewis became only the fifth player to eclipse the 2,000-yard rushing mark in league history, with his single-season total placing second all-time; just 39 yards short of the NFL record held by Eric Dickerson. Their first playoff game, at home against the Tennessee Titans, went back and forth, with the Ravens being held to only 100 yards total rushing. The Ravens lost, though, by three, 20–17.

For his remarkable season, Jamal Lewis was named as the NFL Offensive Player of the Year, while linebacker Ray Lewis, with another stand-out year that included 6 interceptions, was also recognized as Defensive Player of the Year for the second time in his career. This marked the first time ever that teammates received these respective individual honors in the same season.

After the season Art Modell officially transferred the remaining bulk of his ownership to Bisciotti, ending over 40 years of tenure as an NFL franchise majority owner. Modell still held an office at the Ravens' headquarters in Owings Mills, Maryland, and remained with the team as a consultant.

=== 2004 ===
The Ravens attempted to engineer a trade for Terrell Owens in the 2004 offseason, but the NFLPA filed a grievance with the NFL, claiming Terrell Owens should have been granted free agency. Just before a judge made a decision in the case, the NFL and NFLPA came to a settlement, which set up a 3-way trade between the Eagles, 49ers, and Ravens. Owens went to the Eagles, and the Ravens got back the pick they had traded to the 49ers, and were also granted a 5th round draft pick. Boller remained quarterback through the entire season. Ed Reed became a full-fledged star on defense, with nine interceptions. Reed was also named the NFL Defensive Player of the Year. He broke the NFL record for longest INT return, with a 106-yard return against the Cleveland Browns. Baltimore remained in playoff contention the entire season, but with a 9–7 record did not go to the playoffs.

=== 2005 ===
In the 2005 offseason the Ravens looked to augment their receiving corps (which was second-worst in the NFL in 2004) by signing Derrick Mason from the Titans and drafting star Oklahoma wide receiver Mark Clayton in the first round of the 2005 NFL draft.

The 2005 season (the Ravens' 10th Anniversary season) began as the featured Sunday Night Football game televised by ESPN. This game against the Indianapolis Colts led the announcer to state, "What a wonderful way to begin the season, the game between the team that plays here now and the team which used to play here." The game's first half was a defensive slugfest, with the score at the half 3–0 Colts, but the second half saw the Ravens fall apart and starting QB Kyle Boller was lost to a foot injury (Colts 24, Ravens 7).

In the 2nd week road opener versus historic rival Tennessee, backup QB Anthony Wright failed to spark the offense and the defense couldn't hold the Titans back, allowing the second straight loss (25–10). During the team's bye week, coach Billick tried to install the idea that after the bye, the season starts anew and they forget about their past losses. This strategy led the Ravens to a Week 4 Win against the Jets (13–3), but the Ravens fell apart against the Lions (35–17), setting a franchise record for penalties in a single game (21). The Ravens rebounded at home the next week against the Cleveland Browns, with a final score of 16–3. However, from Week 7 to Week 10, the Ravens would lose to the Chicago Bears (10–6), the Pittsburgh Steelers (20–19), the Cincinnati Bengals (21–9), and the Jacksonville Jaguars (30–3).

The Ravens turned the tide in a Week 11 rematch with the Steelers at home, winning 16–13 in OT, but were season-swept by the Bengals the next week, 42–29. The Ravens won their next game against the hapless Houston Texans 16–15, but lost a week later on the road to the Denver Broncos 12–10. Then, the Ravens played their final two home games under the prime time light. First, they manhandled the Green Bay Packers on Monday Night Football 48–3. Then, they destroyed any playoff chance that the Minnesota Vikings had by winning on Sunday Night Football 30–23. Despite the resurgence of Kyle Boller, they couldn't carry their momentum entirely. Despite leading the Browns 13–6 at halftime, they lost the lead in the 3rd quarter and trailed for the rest of the game, ultimately losing 20–16.

The Ravens ended their season 6–10. Despite having the same regular season record as the Cleveland Browns, the Ravens were technically third in the AFC North, since they beat the Browns on the division records tiebreaker: In the AFC North, the Ravens were 2–4, while the Browns were 1–5.

=== 2006 ===
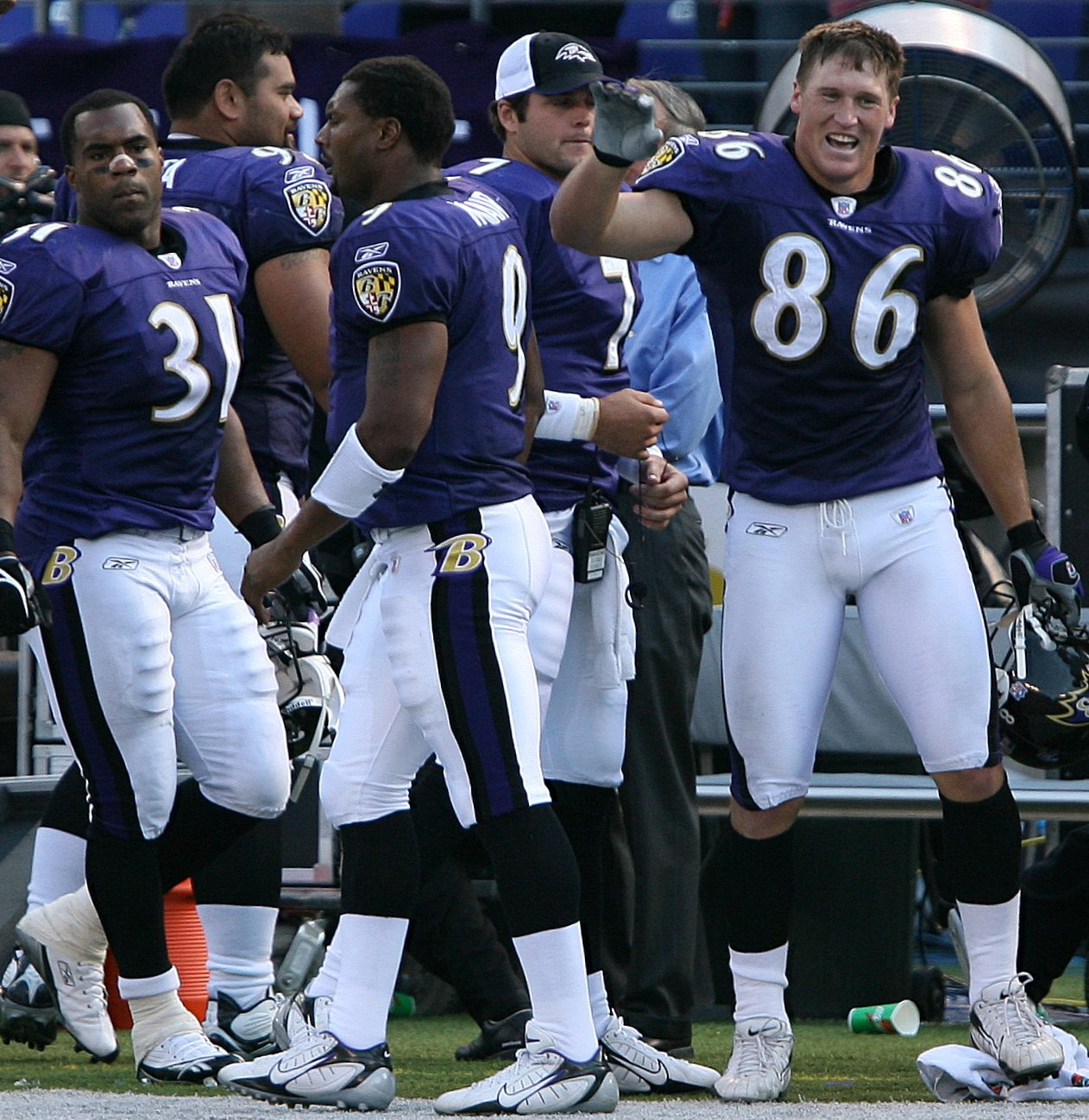
Ravens RB Jamal Lewis (31), DT Haloti Ngata (92), QBs Kyle Boller (7) and Steve McNair (9), and TE Todd Heap with the Ravens in 2006.

The 2006 Baltimore Ravens season began with the team trying to improve on their 6–10 record in 2005. The Ravens, for the first time in franchise history, started 4–0 under the surprising leadership of former Titans quarterback Steve McNair. With miracle offensive plays engineered primarily in the second half of games by players Todd Heap, Jamal Lewis, Mark J. Clayton, and even backup quarterback Kyle Boller, the team scored key victories over playoff-bound teams such as San Diego and New Orleans.

The Ravens then lost 2 straight games mid-season on offensive troubles, prompting coach Brian Billick to drop their offensive coordinator Jim Fassel in their week 7 bye. Also during the mid-season, the Ravens won an important victory when McNair and wide receiver Derrick Mason returned with the Ravens to their former stomping grounds of Tennessee to defeat the Titans.

Riding the influence of their winning streak, the Ravens sought a sweep of the AFC North division in a rematch against the Bengals late in the season. Baltimore was unable to produce offensively enough to overcome a team led by their own former defensive coordinator Marvin Lewis. The loss ended Baltimore's hopes of a division sweep.

Still ranked second overall to the first-place San Diego, Baltimore continued. They slowed down the surging Chiefs, continued dominance over rival Cleveland, and held the defending Super Bowl champion Pittsburgh Steelers to only one touchdown at Heinz Field, allowing the Ravens to still clinch the AFC North.

The Ravens ended the regular season with a franchise-best 13–3 record. Still considered one of the better teams in the NFL, and a Super Bowl favorite by some the Ravens had secured the AFC North title, the No. 2 AFC playoff seed, and clinched a 1st-round bye. The Ravens were slated to face the Indianapolis Colts in the second round of the playoffs, in the first meeting of the two teams in the playoffs. Many Baltimore and Indianapolis fans saw this historic meeting as a sort of "Judgment Day" with the new team of Baltimore facing the old team of Baltimore (the former Baltimore Colts having left Baltimore on March 28, 1984). In one of the most bizarre playoff games in NFL history, both Indianapolis and Baltimore were held to scoring only field goals as the two defenses slugged it out all over M&T Bank Stadium. McNair threw two costly interceptions, including one at the 1-yard line. The Super Bowl bound Colts won 15–6, ending Baltimore's season.

During this offseason the Ravens waived Jamal Lewis, who signed with the Cleveland Browns, and failed to re-sign Adalius Thomas who signed with the New England Patriots, and Ovie Mughelli who signed with the Atlanta Falcons. Ravens then traded for Willis McGahee with a 3rd and 7th round draft pick in 2007 and a 3rd round pick in 2008.

=== 2007 ===
After a stellar 2006 season, the Ravens hoped to improve upon their 13–3 record but injuries and poor play plagued the team. The Ravens finished the 2007 season in the AFC North cellar with a disappointing 5–11 record. A humiliating 22–16 overtime loss to the previously winless Miami Dolphins on December 16 ultimately led to Billick's dismissal on New Year's Eve, one day after the end of the regular season. He was replaced by John Harbaugh, the special teams coach of the Philadelphia Eagles and the older brother of former Ravens quarterback Jim Harbaugh (1998).

== 2008–2017: John Harbaugh and Joe Flacco era ==
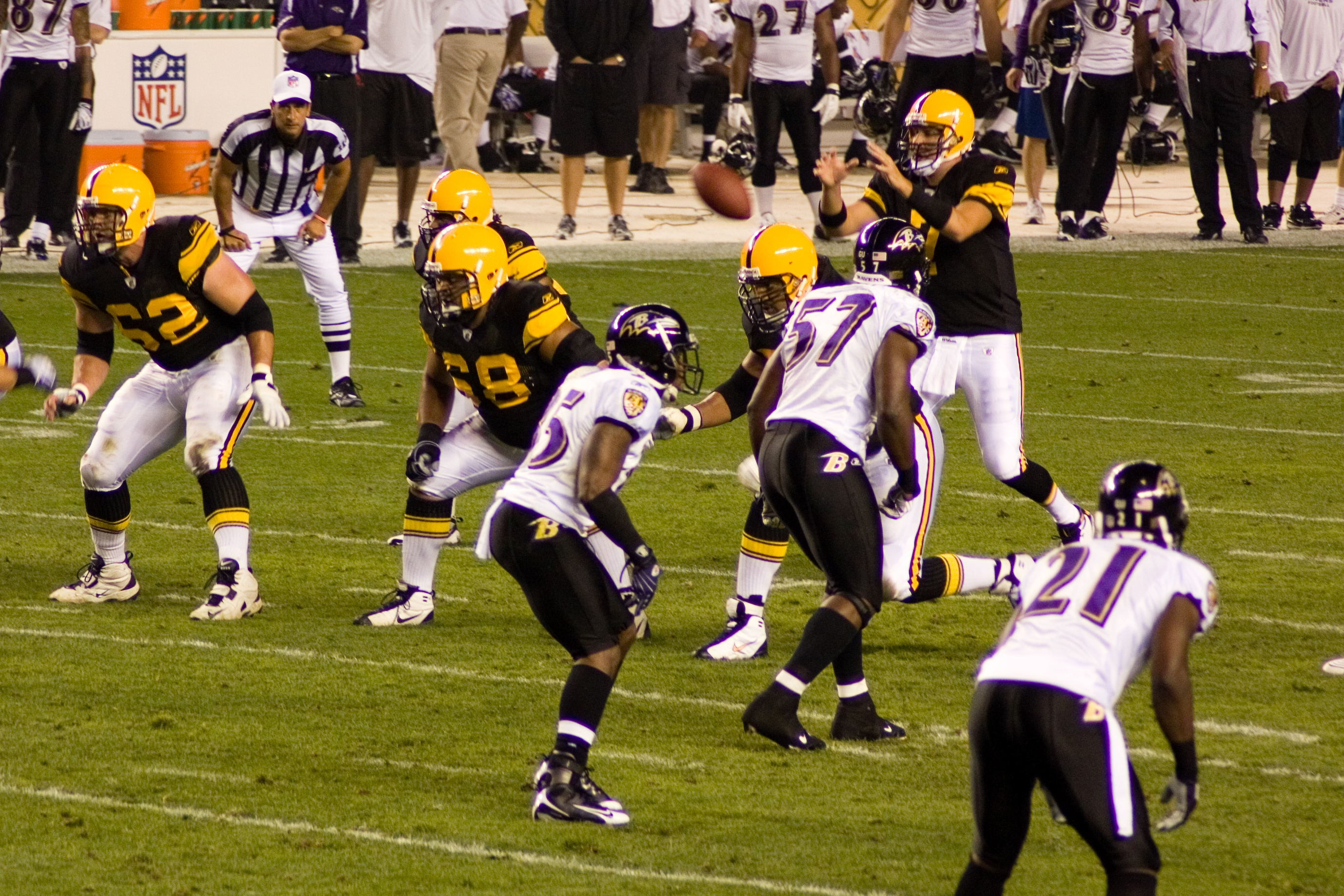
Corey Ivy (35), Bart Scott (57) and Chris McAlister (21) in 2008.

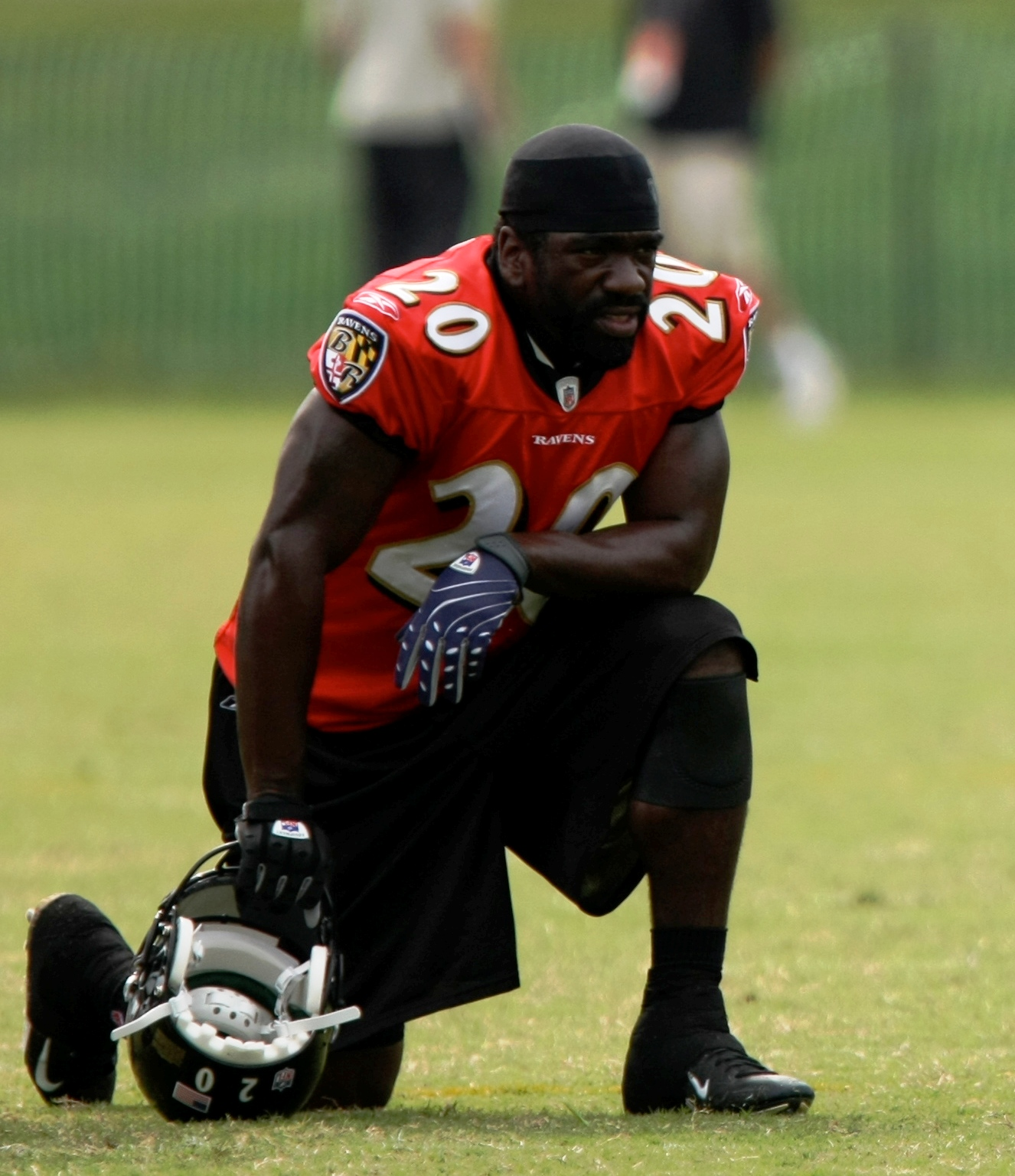
Ed Reed at the Baltimore Ravens 2008 Training Camp.

With rookies at head coach (John Harbaugh) and quarterback (Joe Flacco), the Ravens entered the 2008 campaign with much uncertainty. Their Week 2 contest at the Houston Texans was postponed until two months later because of Hurricane Ike, forcing the Ravens to play for what would eventually be 18 straight weeks. With its record at 2–3 after consecutive losses to the Pittsburgh Steelers, Tennessee Titans and Indianapolis Colts, its triumph over the Dolphins in Week 7 was redemption for what had happened against the same opponent in the previous season. Eight victories in its last ten regular season matches enabled them to clinch the sixth seed in the AFC playoffs at an 11–5 record. Possibly the biggest win during that stretch came in Week 16 with a 33–24 humbling of the Dallas Cowboys in the final game at Texas Stadium. Willis McGahee's 77-yard touchdown run in the fourth quarter established a new stadium record which would last until Le'Ron McClain, on the very first offensive play of the Ravens' next possession, secured the victory with an 82-yarder.

On the strength of four interceptions, one resulting in an Ed Reed touchdown, the Ravens began its postseason run by winning a rematch over Miami 27–9 at Dolphin Stadium on January 4, 2009, in a wild-card game. Six days later, they advanced to the AFC Championship Game by avenging a Week 5 loss to the Titans 13–10 at LP Field on a Matt Stover field goal with 53 seconds left in regulation time. The Ravens fell one victory short of Super Bowl XLIII by losing to the Steelers 23–14 at Heinz Field on January 18, 2009.

=== 2009 ===
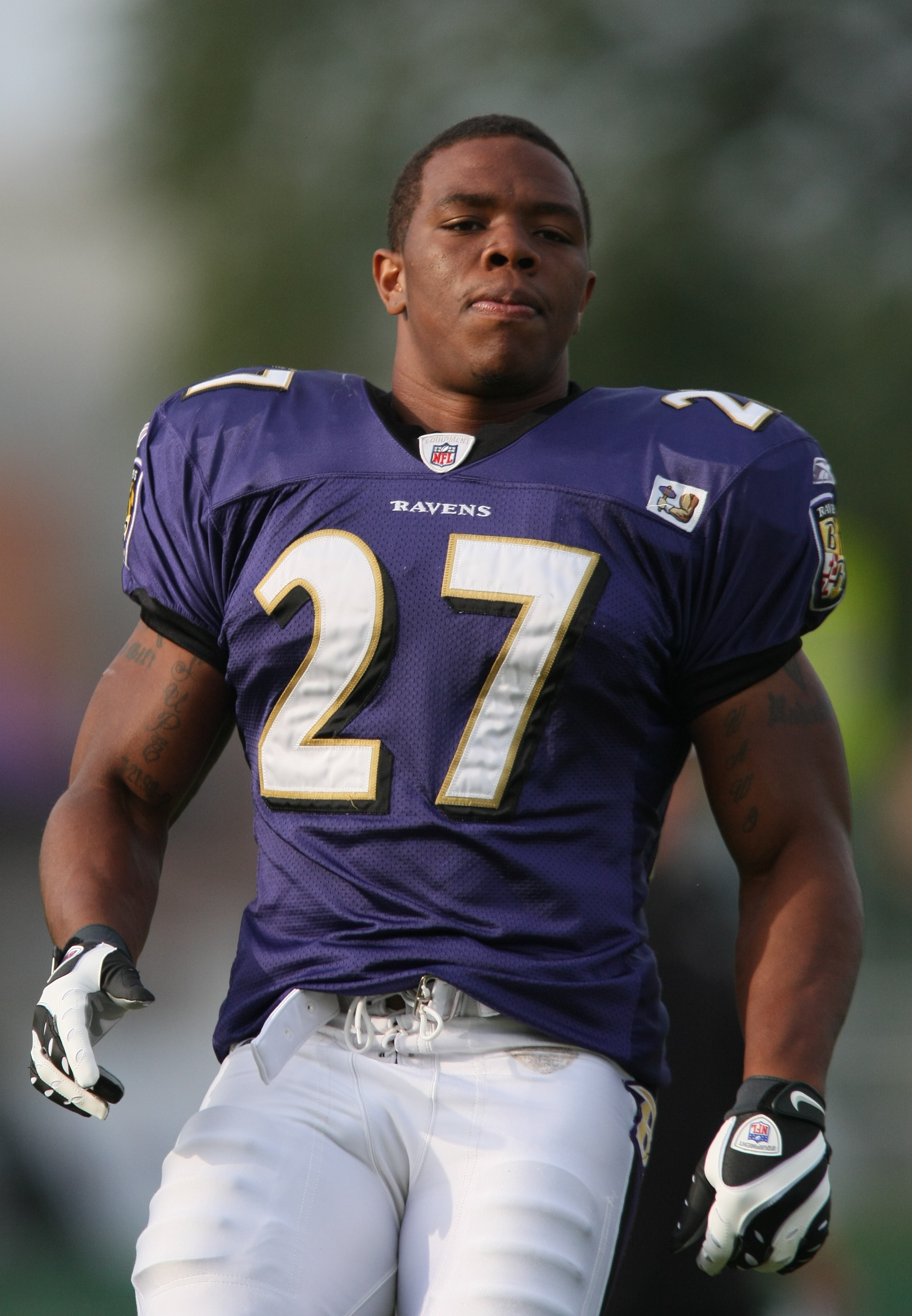
Ray Rice was drafted by the Ravens in 2008 and he made the Pro Bowl for the 2009, 2010, and 2011 seasons.

With Jonathan Ogden retiring after the 2007 season and Matt Stover going into free agency, Baltimore's only remaining player from its first season was Ray Lewis. The Ravens held the 26th pick in the 2009 NFL draft but went up to the 23rd pick by trading its 26th pick and a 5th round pick to the New England Patriots. The Ravens selected Michael Oher (who later had a movie named The Blind Side made after his life during his early years) in the first round of the NFL Draft.

In the season opener the offense continued its improvements from the year before as it scored 38 points and accounted for over 500 yards in a 38–24 victory over the Kansas City Chiefs. In week 2, the Ravens defeated the San Diego Chargers 31–26. Although the Ravens secondary struggled, Ray Lewis made a crucial tackle on fourth down of the Chargers' final drive to seal the Baltimore win. In week 3, the Ravens defeated the Cleveland Browns in a 34–3 blowout while celebrating Derrick Mason's 800th pass reception in his career.

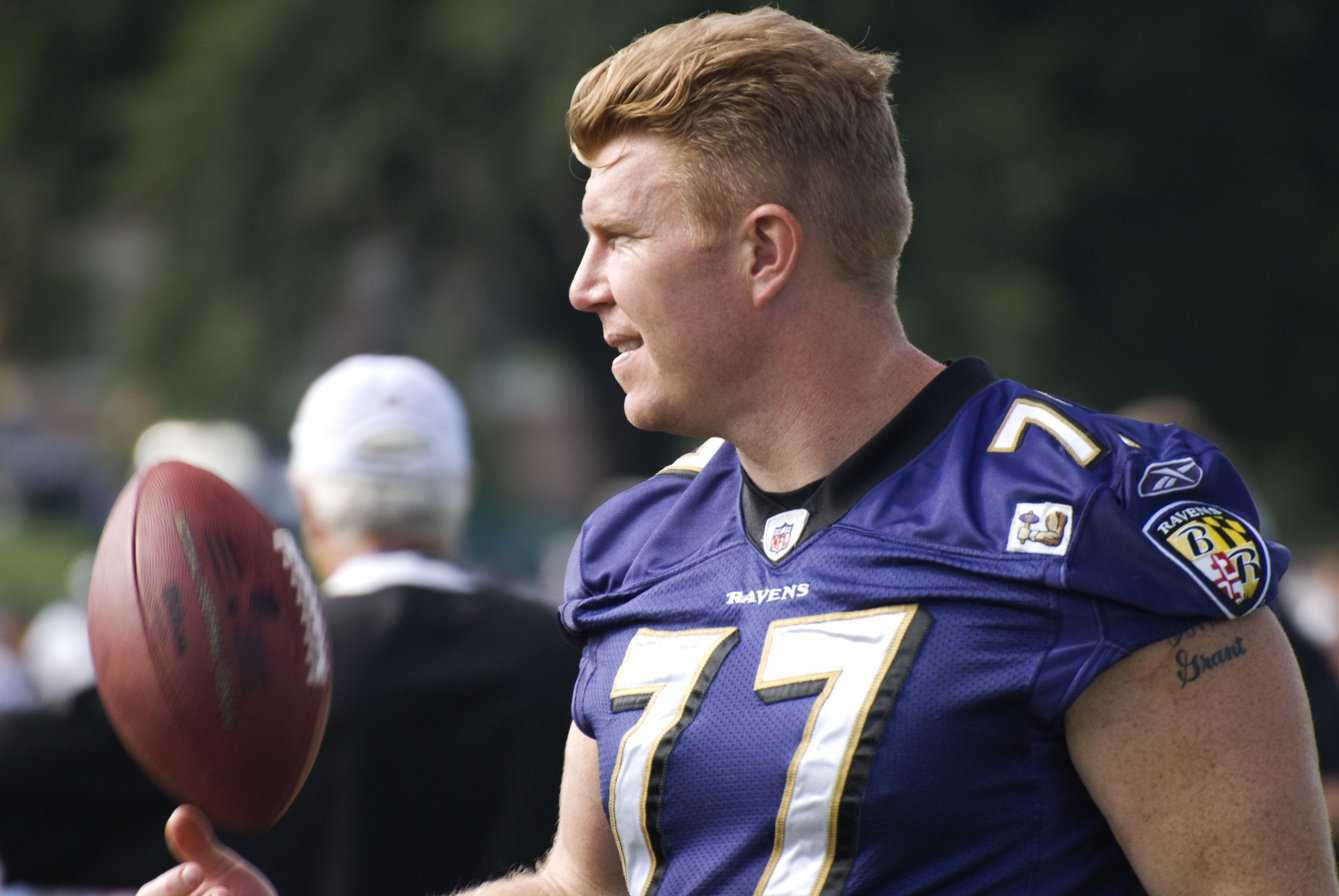
Matt Birk during Ravens 2009 Training Camp.

In week 4, the Ravens lost to the New England Patriots, 27–21, with their final drive ending with a dropped pass by Mark Clayton on 4th down within the 10-yard line with 28 seconds left on the clock. The following week, the Ravens hosted the Cincinnati Bengals, but lost with the Bengals' final drive resulting in a touchdown. The Ravens then played an away game against the Minnesota Vikings lost 33–31, putting them behind both the Bengals and the Steelers in the AFC North. The Ravens had rallied from 17 points down to the Vikings and managed to drive the ball down the field, but Steve Hauschka missed a 44-yard field goal as time expired on the clock. Joe Flacco made 28 out of 43 passing attempts and threw for a career-high 385 yards, and Ray Rice ran for 117 yards. The very next week they hosted the Denver Broncos, who were undefeated (6–0). After Hauschka kicked a pair of field goals in the 1st and 2nd quarters, the Broncos kicked off at the start of the 3rd quarter and the Ravens immediately returned it for a touchdown, giving the Ravens a 13–0 lead. They finished the game victorious, crushing the Broncos 30–7, handing Denver its first loss of the season.

The following week they looked to avenge the week 5 loss to the Bengals. However, they were out-played on both sides of the ball, suffered a crucial miss by Hauschka, and lost 17–7.

In week 10 the Ravens visited the Cleveland Browns on Monday Night Football and shut out their divisional rivals 16–0 despite a slow offensive start. Steve Hauschka missed a field goal and had an extra point blocked, costing the Ravens four points. This led coach John Harbaugh to release Hauschka and replace him with Billy Cundiff.

In week 11 the Ravens played their third undefeated opponent, the Colts, who were (9–0). They lost 17–15, failing to score a single touchdown. Cundiff went 5 for 6 on field goals, scoring the Ravens only points. Joe Flacco threw a late interception and after Ed Reed's fumbled attempt to lateral on a punt return, Peyton Manning kneeled to seal the Colts' seventh consecutive victory against Baltimore. With this loss, the Ravens record stood at 5–5, ranking third in the AFC North.

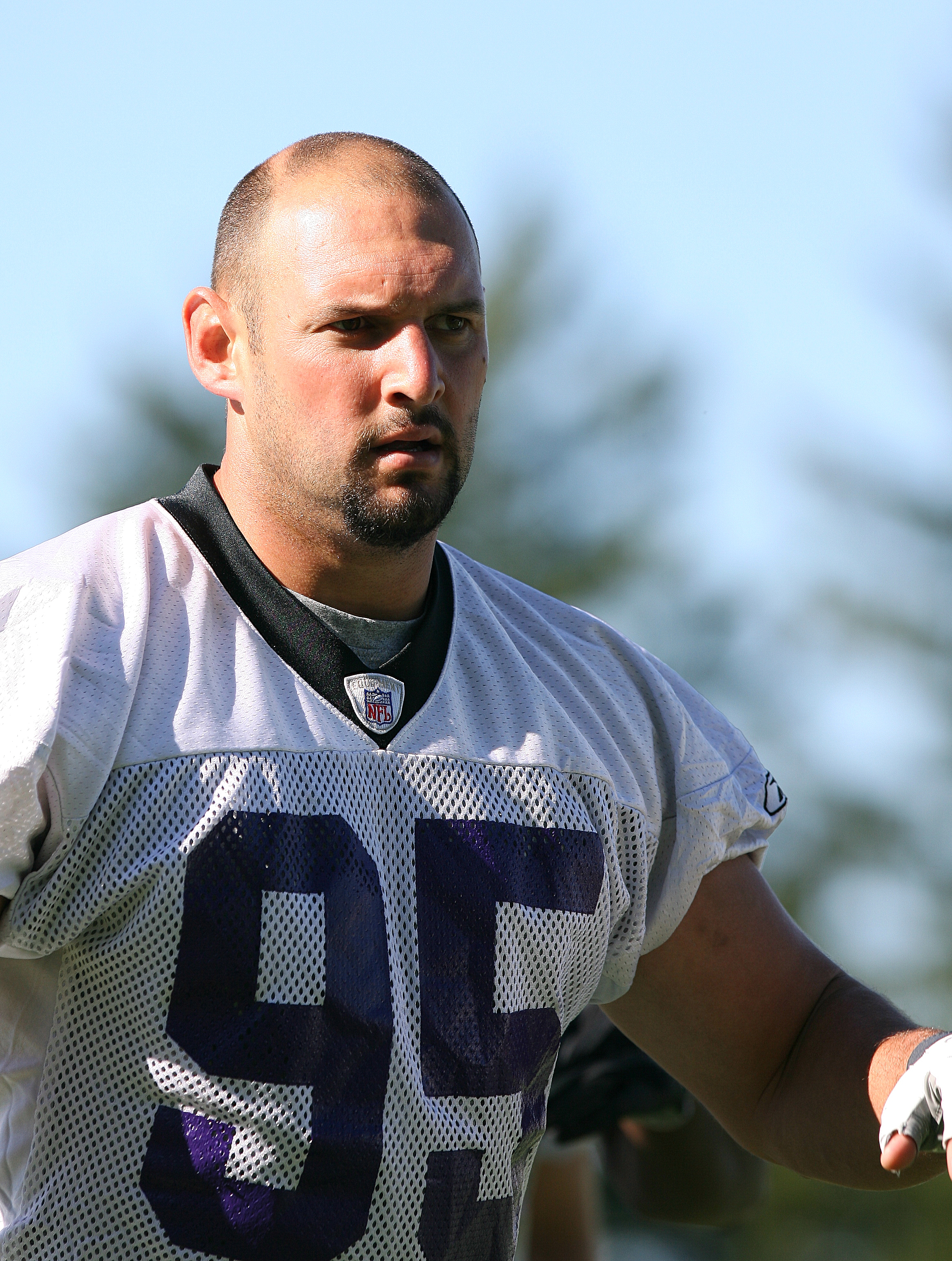
Jarret Johnson spent nine seasons with the Ravens from 2003 to 2011.

The Ravens then beat the Steelers, who were playing without quarterback Ben Roethlisberger with an overtime field goal on Sunday Night Football. The next week, however, the Ravens lost to the Green Bay Packers on ESPN Monday Night Football.

The Ravens then crushed two opponents from the NFC North at home, beating the Detroit Lions 48–3 and the Chicago Bears 31–7. The Ravens improved to 8–6, second in the AFC North, and in line for the fifth seed. They looked ahead to their division rivals, the Steelers, who were coming off a dramatic last-second win against the Packers. A win would give the Ravens a chance to clinch a playoff spot and would knock the Steelers out of contention. But the Ravens, who committed 11 penalties and blew several chances to put additional points on Pittsburgh, lost 23–20. The Ravens still had a shot at the playoffs with a week 17 victory, and made it defeating the Oakland Raiders 21–13.

In the playoffs they faced the Patriots in the wild card round. The Ravens beat the Patriots 33–14, aided by Ray Rice's 83-yard touchdown run on the first play from scrimmage, helping them to a 24–0 lead at the end of the first quarter. Advancing to the AFC divisional round, they next played Indianapolis. Two touchdowns late in the first half gave the Colts a 17–3 lead at halftime, and Baltimore miscues in the second half ensured the end of their season, by a 20–3 score.

=== 2010 ===
During the 2009–2010 offseason the Ravens made some key additions to their offense by acquiring WR Anquan Boldin from the Arizona Cardinals and free agent T. J. Houshmandzadeh, released after the preseason by the Seattle Seahawks. They also added Donté Stallworth, who most last played for the Cleveland Browns, but was suspended for the 2009 season, and signed back-up quarterback Mark Bulger who was released by the St. Louis Rams after the 1–15 2009 season. Stallworth broke his foot in the third preseason game and came back later in the season. On July 25 Sergio Kindle suffered a head trauma after falling down two flights of stairs in a home in Austin, Texas and was lost for the season. The new additions accounted for a combined 37 starts.

The Ravens finished the season at 12–4 but with a marginally worse divisional record (Steelers 5–1 divisionally versus the Ravens' 4–2). They then went on to defeat the Kansas City Chiefs 30–7 in the wild card round of the playoffs, with running back Ray Rice becoming the first Raven running back to have a receiving touchdown in a playoff game. The Ravens would then lose to the Steelers 31–24 in the divisional playoffs. Leading at halftime 21–7, the Ravens then turned the ball over three times in the third quarter, in which gave the Steelers 14 points. Baltimore's season ended with a potential touchdown drop by Anquan Boldin and, later, another drop by T. J. Houshmandzadeh on 4th down, surrendering the game 31–24.

=== 2011 ===
After the 2011 NFL season labor dispute had ended, the Ravens had informed veterans Willis McGahee, Todd Heap, Kelly Gregg, and Derrick Mason that they would be cut to free up salary cap space. Following these cuts, the Ravens acquired fullback Vonta Leach, wide receiver Lee Evans, safety Bernard Pollard, and running back Ricky Williams. During the pre season, the Baltimore Ravens signed Left tackle Bryant McKinnie from the Minnesota Vikings. On top of that the Ravens signed Pro bowl center Andre Gurode from the Dallas Cowboys. With the new signings, there was a reshuffle within the Offensive line. The signing of McKinnie forced Michael Oher over to the Right Tackle position, which in turn allowed Marshal Yanda to revert to his natural Right Guard position. The Ravens finished their pre season 3–1, with a loss to the Philadelphia Eagles, and victories over the Washington Redskins, the Kansas City Chiefs, and the Atlanta Falcons.

2011 marked one of the most successful seasons in Baltimore Ravens franchise history. The Ravens started their campaign with a big 35–7 victory at home over their rivals the Pittsburgh Steelers. Other key victories included a 34–17 victory over the New York Jets in week three, a week six 29–14 victory over the Houston Texans, and a week nine win over the Steelers, this would be the first time since 2006 that the Ravens would sweep Pittsburgh in the AFC North division.

The Ravens went on and had a big win over the San Francisco 49ers in a week twelve Thursday night thanksgiving game. This was a game where Ravens coach John Harbaugh would face off against his brother Jim Harbaugh who had just taken over as head coach of the 49ers in the 2011 season. The Ravens would go on to end a 49ers win streak in a final score of 16–6. The Ravens recorded a franchise record of nine sacks on 49ers quarterback Alex Smith, three coming from Ravens linebacker Terrell Suggs.

The Ravens went into the final week of the regular season already assured of a play-off place at 11–4, but were tied with the Steelers record wise, and so they had to beat the Cincinnati Bengals on the road, to clinch the AFC North division for the first time since 2006. The Ravens defeated the Bengals for the second time in the 2011 regular season by a score of 24–16. The victory sealed the AFC North crown, a season 12–4 record, and a first round bye in the playoffs, which in turn sent both the Steelers and the Bengals on road in the wildcard playoff games – which both rivals lost to the Denver Broncos, and the Texans, respectively.

The Ravens accomplished a number of significant achievements during the 2011 season, finishing 6–0 in the division, 6–0 against 2012 playoff teams, and 8–0 at home. The Ravens went into the 2012 NFL playoffs with high expectations, however there were underlying worries, with what many considered to be inconsistent performances throughout the season by starting quarterback Joe Flacco and the Ravens offense – which many put the blame on for the four questionable road losses that came against teams they were expected to beat, the Tennessee Titans, Jacksonville Jaguars, Seattle Seahawks, and San Diego Chargers.

The Texans would end up beating the Bengals in the wild card playoff round, which meant that they would face the Ravens in the divisional playoff game. The Ravens won the game 20–13 in a defensive struggle, Ed Reed would intercept a pass from the Texans rookie quarterback T. J. Yates in a fourth quarter offensive drive by the Texans, which ended up being the Texans last realistic shot at scoring to tie the game. Despite the victory over the Texans, a significant amount of sports media questioned the Ravens' offensive capability going into the AFC championship playoff round, after another proposed poor performance by the Ravens offense and Joe Flacco according to certain sports analysts.

The Ravens and New England Patriots played for a spot in the Super Bowl. After a close 3 quarters which saw the ball being turned over several times, Tom Brady leaped over the goal line on a 4th and 1 to put the Patriots ahead 23–20. After another couple of turnovers on both ends the Ravens marched down the field with under a minute to go. Joe Flacco threw a pass to Lee Evans with 38 seconds left, who appeared to catch it for the winning touchdown but the ball was knocked out by Patriots defensive back Sterling Moore, resulting in an incomplete pass. After Joe Flacco threw a dropped pass to Lee Evans, Billy Cundiff came out onto the field with 15 seconds to go to try and tie the game up with a 32-yard field goal. The kick went well to the left of the Patriots' goal post, and New England advanced to Super Bowl XLVI for a rematch with the New York Giants in Super Bowl XLII.

The inaugural NFL Honors ceremony was held on Super Bowl's eve. At this event, Terrell Suggs was named the Defensive Player of the Year and Matt Birk was named Walter Payton Man of The Year.

=== 2012: Ray Lewis' final season and second Super Bowl ===
Despite early injuries that led to struggles on the defensive side of the football, the Ravens jumped out to a 9–2 start thanks in part to a high powered no-huddle offense led by Joe Flacco. Needing just a single win to secure a second straight division title, the Ravens went on a three-game losing streak, highlighted by the firing of offensive coordinator Cam Cameron, promotion of quarterback coach Jim Caldwell to offensive coordinator, and a 34–17 loss at home to Peyton Manning and the Denver Broncos on December 16. Regardless, the Ravens clinched their fifth straight playoff berth after the Steelers lost to the Dallas Cowboys. Despite making the playoffs, this slump led some media outlets to questions the Ravens ability to win football games, but after making a statement with a decisive 33–14 victory over the Super Bowl champion New York Giants and securing back to back division titles for the first time in franchise history, they finished with a regular season record of 10–6 and a rare home playoff game in the Wildcard Round.

The 2012 season also saw long-serving linebacker Ray Lewis announce his retirement heading into the AFC Wildcard game against the Indianapolis Colts. Lewis tore his triceps midway through October in his 17th season with the Ravens after Baltimore selected him with the 26th overall pick in the 1996 NFL Draft. The unusual timing of the announcement was criticized by some, such as former New York Giant Amani Toomer who accused Lewis of being selfish. Nonetheless, many, to include team mate Terrell Suggs, considered the timing to as a "stroke of genius in regards to Lewis' strong motivational presence, and credited Lewis with providing the necessary inspiration for the team in what would prove to be a Super Bowl victory season. They defeated the Colts during the Wild Card round on January 6, 2013 at M&T Bank Stadium, with Ray Lewis celebrating his final game at home with his trademark dance both at the start of the game as he was introduced and on the final play of the game when he was brought back onto the field. With the defeat of the Colts in the Wildcard round, the Ravens were primed to face the Denver Broncos at Mile High Stadium in Denver in the AFC divisional round. Labeled as huge underdogs coming into the game, especially considering the previous thrashing the Broncos dealt them in a home loss on December 16, 2012, the Ravens shocked the sports world by defeating the Peyton Manning-led Denver Broncos in double overtime, 38–35, in a spectacular divisional round matchup on Saturday, January 12, 2013. It looked as though they had lost the game as they got the ball with just over a minute left on their own twenty-three-yard line, but a clutch 70-yard touchdown pass, known colloquially as "The Mile High Miracle", from Joe Flacco to Jacoby Jones sent the game to overtime. In overtime, an interception of Peyton Manning by Corey Graham (who had already returned one interception for a touchdown earlier in the game) put the Ravens in field position to kick the winning field goal. The win vaulted the Ravens to play for the AFC Conference Championship against the New England Patriots on Sunday, January 20, 2013; the Ravens won 28–13 after shutting out Tom Brady and the New England offense in the second half, completely dismantling any offensive attempt(s) thereafter. The win placed the Ravens in Super Bowl XLVII against the San Francisco 49ers on February 3, 2013. The Ravens opened the game in thrilling fashion as their opening drive of the game ended with a touchdown pass from eventual Super Bowl MVP Joe Flacco to wide receiver Anquan Boldin. Flacco threw two second-quarter touchdown passes as Baltimore took a 21–6 lead into halftime. After halftime, the Ravens received the kickoff from the 49ers, and Jacoby Jones returned the kickoff for a record setting 108-yard touchdown. However, soon after the Jacoby Jones touchdown, a power-outage at the stadium led to a 34-minute stoppage in play due to inefficiencies in lighting, on-field visibility, and electrical equipment. After power was restored, the 49ers regained composure and came storming back, scoring 17 unanswered points. The 49ers had a final chance to take the lead late in the game, but a goal-line stand by the Ravens with less than two minutes remaining sealed the contest as the Baltimore Ravens won Super Bowl XLVII 34–31. Super Bowl XLVII has also been dubbed the "Harbaugh Bowl" since the 49ers were coached by Jim Harbaugh, the brother of Ravens coach John Harbaugh. The Ravens returned to Baltimore to celebrate with their fans on Tuesday, February 5. A parade saw upwards of 300,000 people line the streets of downtown Baltimore while another 80,000 packed M&T Bank Stadium to cheer the team. Speeches by owner Steve Biscotti, Coach John Harbaugh, Ray Lewis and Ed Reed were met by fans with standing ovations.

=== 2013 ===
By virtue of winning Super Bowl XLVII, the Ravens were scheduled to host the Kickoff Game on Thursday, September 5, 2013; however, due to a scheduling conflict with the Baltimore Orioles (with whom they share a parking lot) and the NFL's refusal to move the game to a different night, the Baltimore Ravens were the first Super Bowl Champion in 10 years not to host the following year's Kickoff Game. The 2013 Kickoff Game was played at Sports Authority Field at Mile High when the Ravens visited the Denver Broncos.

After losing linebacker Ray Lewis and center Matt Birk to retirement, the Ravens' roster underwent significant changes throughout the 2013 offseason. Free agent linebacker Paul Kruger signed with the Cleveland Browns, linebacker Dannell Ellerbe signed with the Miami Dolphins, cornerback Cary Williams signed with the Philadelphia Eagles, and safety Ed Reed signed with the Houston Texans. Additionally, safety Bernard Pollard was released due to salary cap reasons and later signed with the Tennessee Titans. Wide receiver Anquan Boldin was traded to the San Francisco 49ers for a sixth-round draft pick. The Ravens made some offseason additions as well, signing defensive linemen Chris Canty and Marcus Spears as well as signing key free agent linebacker Elvis Dumervil and safety Michael Huff. As well as drafting first round pick Safety Matt Elam, second round pick Linebacker Arthur Brown, third round pick Defensive Tackle Brandon Williams, and fourth round pick "hybrid" Fullback Kyle Juszczyk among others. Unfortunately during training camp the Ravens lost another key player, tight-end Dennis Pitta for the entire season (who was primed for an even greater 2013 season). During a routine drill, he suffered a dislocated/fractured hip after colliding with another teammate (James Ihedigbo) at the back of the end zone. In response, during August, they re-signed wide receiver Brandon Stokley, whom they drafted in 1999, and signed former Colts and Tampa Bay Buccaneers tight end, Dallas Clark.

The season started out badly for the Ravens, as they were defeated by the Broncos in their season opener, thus becoming the second Super Bowl Champion to lose the NFL kickoff game. This meant that they held the first loss of the season, breaking a record for the most points allowed by the defense and ending a 75-game streak of holding a .500 or better win–loss ratio. They would rebound in Week 2 with a 14–6 victory over their division rival, the Cleveland Browns. The following week the Ravens took on the unbeaten Houston Texans at home; this time they would face a familiar face in safety Ed Reed, who played for them for 12 seasons. After a strong showing by the defense, which only allowed 9 points, the Ravens clobbered the Texans 30–9. In Week 4, the Ravens struggled against the Buffalo Bills as Joe Flacco threw a career-high 5 interceptions. The Ravens fell to the Bills 23–20. At 2–2, the Ravens hit the road to Miami to take on the Dolphins. Although they faced a 13–6 deficit at halftime, the offense rallied to score 17 consecutive points giving the Ravens a 23–13 lead in the 4th quarter. However, Miami answered right back with 10 points of their own, tying the game at 23 with 8:03 left. Justin Tucker then kicked a 44-yard field goal with 1:42 left to give the Ravens a 26–23 lead. After the Dolphins comeback attempt stalled, Caleb Sturgis missed a field goal late, giving the Ravens the win. The Ravens then returned home to take on the Green Bay Packers. The offense struggled early, as the Ravens were shut out in the first half. Trailing 16–3 in the 4th quarter Joe Flacco found Jacoby Jones in the end zone for an 11-yard touchdown pass to reduce the deficit to 16–10. After another Packers field goal, the Ravens faced a 19–10 deficit with 4:17 remaining. Joe Flacco was able to find Dallas Clark in the end zone for an 18-yard touchdown pass, making it 19–17. However, the Packers were able to seal the victory by picking up first downs and running out the clock. The following week, the Ravens would fall to their rivals, the Pittsburgh Steelers 16–19 on a last second field goal by Steelers kicker Shaun Suisham. The following week, the Ravens would lose 18–24 to the Cleveland Browns for the first time under John Harbaugh. Facing the probable end to their season at that point, the Ravens would snap their three-game skid with a win against their first-place division rivals, the Cincinnati Bengals 20–17 in overtime. The following week, the Ravens were scheduled to face the Chicago Bears. The game was delayed for two hours due to a heavy storm. The Ravens would, however, fall to the Bears 20–23 in overtime. They would rebound the next week in a home game against the New York Jets. On Thanksgiving, the Ravens would defeat the Steelers 22–20 at home, avenging their Week 7 loss to them, and improving to 2–0 on Thanksgiving games. In Week 14, the Ravens would beat the Minnesota Vikings 26–29. In Week 15, the Ravens would beat the Detroit Lions at Ford Field 18–16 off Justin Tucker's 6 field goals, including a 61-yarder that proved to be the game-clinching score followed by a Matthew Stafford interception. In Week 16, the Ravens would lose at home to the New England Patriots 41–7 making it the second worst home loss in Ravens history. In Week 17, the Ravens faced the Cincinnati Bengals. The defense forced 4 interceptions on Andy Dalton but it wasn't enough for the offense to take advantage of. Baltimore tied the game 17–17 in the second half, but surrendered 17 unanswered points to the Bengals, thus ending their season at 8–8 and missing the playoffs for the first time since 2007.

=== 2014 ===
On January 27, 2014, the Ravens hired former Houston Texans head coach Gary Kubiak to be their new offensive coordinator after Jim Caldwell accepted the new available head coaching job with the Detroit Lions. In the 2014 NFL draft, the Ravens selected C.J. Mosley with the 17th overall pick. During the offseason, the Ravens signed former Carolina Panthers wide receiver Steve Smith to a three-year contract. They also signed tight end Owen Daniels and running back Justin Forsett, as they played for Kubiak in Houston and would seemingly fit in Kubiak's new system. On February 15, 2014, star running back Ray Rice and his fiancée Janay Palmer were arrested and charged with assault after a physical altercation at Revel Casino in Atlantic City, New Jersey. Celebrity news website TMZ posted a video of Rice dragging Palmer's body out of an elevator after apparently knocking her out. For the incident, Rice was initially suspended for the first two games of the 2014 NFL season on July 25, 2014, which led to widespread criticism of the NFL.

In Week 1, on September 7, the Baltimore Ravens lost to the Cincinnati Bengals, 23–16. The next day, on September 8, 2014, TMZ released additional footage from an elevator camera showing Rice punching Palmer. The Baltimore Ravens terminated Rice's contract as a result, and was later indefinitely suspended by the NFL. Although starting out 0–1 for two straight seasons and having received unwanted media attention for the Ray Rice incident, on September 11, 2014, the Ravens rallied back and beat the Pittsburgh Steelers 26–6 on Thursday Night Football, to improve to 1–1 . On the Sunday after the Thursday night victory, the Ravens headed to Cleveland for a third straight division game with the Browns. In a tough fought game, the Baltimore Ravens won 23–21 with a game-winning 32-yard field goal by Justin Tucker as time expired. On September 28, the Ravens hosted the Carolina Panthers, and in a fabulous offensive performance, defeated the Carolina Panthers 38–10; with this victory the Ravens have defeated every visiting franchise at least once at home (and at M&T Bank Stadium). The very next week, the Ravens traveled to Indianapolis to play the Colts in Week 5. However, three turnovers and QB Joe Flacco being sacked four times resulted in a 20–13 loss, breaking the 3–2 Ravens win streak. In week 6, Joe Flacco led the Ravens to an impressive 48–17 victory over the Tampa Bay Buccaneers. Flacco threw 5 touchdown passes in the first 16:03 of the game, an NFL record, to put the contest out of reach early in the 2nd quarter. In Week 7, the Ravens hosted the Atlanta Falcons and won 29–7. The next week, the Ravens traveled to Cincinnati for a key divisional game. Both defenses forced key turnovers in a game that no passing touchdowns were thrown. In the waning seconds of the 4th quarter as Baltimore trailed, Flacco threw an 80-yard touchdown pass to Steve Smith that seemingly won the game. However, Smith was controversially called for offensive pass interference on Bengals safety George Iloka, who looked to have flopped, that negated the touchdown. The Ravens ended up losing 27–24 and being swept by the Bengals for the first time since 2009. The next week, the Ravens traveled to Pittsburgh for another key division match. Two unfortunate turnovers led to an offensive surge by the Steelers and Ben Roethlisberger throwing six touchdowns on an injury riddled Baltimore secondary, humbling the Ravens 43–23. Afterwards, the Ravens made some changes to their secondary, cutting cornerbacks Chykie Brown and Dominique Franks, and signing former Ravens cornerback Danny Gorrer. The Ravens hosted the Tennessee Titans in Week 10, winning 21–7, and going into their bye week 6–4. After the bye week, the Ravens traveled down to New Orleans for an interconference battle with the New Orleans Saints on Monday Night Football. In the third quarter, with the score tied 17–17, new Ravens free safety Will Hill stepped in front of a Drew Brees pass and returned it 44 yards for a touchdown. Running back Justin Forsett had a career night, running for 182 yards and 2 touchdowns, as the Ravens won 34–27, improving their record to 7–4 and a 4–0 sweep of the NFC south. In Week 13 against the San Diego Chargers, the Ravens lost 34–33, allowing the Chargers to score 21 points in the 4th quarter. The Ravens rebounded the next week against the Miami Dolphins winning 27–10, and the defense sacking Dolphins quarterback Ryan Tannehill six times. The defense was even more dominant against the Jacksonville Jaguars in a 20–12 win, sacking rookie quarterback Blake Bortles eight times. In Week 16, the Ravens traveled to Houston to take on the Texans. In one of Joe Flacco's worst performances, the offense sputtered against the Houston defense and Flacco threw three interceptions, including two inside the Ravens own 20-yard line, falling to the Texans 25–13. With their playoff chances and season hanging in the balance, the Ravens took on the Browns in Week 17 at home. After three-quarters had gone by and down 10–3, Joe Flacco led the Ravens on a comeback scoring 17 unanswered points in the 4th quarter, winning 20–10. With the win, and the Kansas City Chiefs defeating the San Diego Chargers, the Ravens clinched their sixth playoff berth in seven seasons, and the first since winning Super Bowl XLVII.

In the wildcard playoff game, the Ravens won 30–17 against their divisional rivals, the Pittsburgh Steelers, at Heinz Field. In the next game in the Divisional round, the Ravens faced the New England Patriots. Despite a strong offensive effort and having a 14-point lead twice in the game, the Ravens were defeated by the Patriots 35–31, ending their season.

=== 2015 ===
The 2015 season marked 20 seasons of the franchise's existence, competing in the NFL which the franchise have recognized with a special badge being worn on their uniforms during the 2015 NFL season. After coming up just short against the Patriots in the playoffs, the Ravens were picked by some to win the AFC and even the Super Bowl. However, they lost key players such as Joe Flacco, Justin Forsett, Terrell Suggs, Steve Smith Sr., and Eugene Monroe to season-ending injuries. Injuries and their inability to win close games early in the season led to the first losing season in the John Harbaugh-Flacco era.

=== 2016 ===
The 2016 Ravens improved on their 5–11 record from 2015, finishing 8–8, but failed to qualify the playoffs for the second straight year. They were eliminated from playoff contention after their Week 16 loss to their division rivals, the Steelers. This was the first time the Ravens missed the playoffs in consecutive seasons since 2004–2005, as well as the first in the Harbaugh/Flacco era.

=== 2017 ===
The Ravens were eliminated from playoff contention during the final week of the season against the Cincinnati Bengals. Needing to stop the Bengals offense one last time in the closing seconds of the fourth quarter, they instead allowed Andy Dalton to connect with Tyler Boyd for a 49-yard game-winning touchdown on fourth and long. The Ravens finished at 9–7, losing out on tiebreakers to the Tennessee Titans and Buffalo Bills for the wild card spots in the playoffs.

== 2018–present: Lamar Jackson era ==
The Ravens started the season at 4–5 and were in danger of missing the playoffs again. However, after Joe Flacco suffered an injury against the Pittsburgh Steelers in week 9, rookie quarterback Lamar Jackson, one of three first-round draft picks that year, filled in and led the Ravens on a 6–1 stretch to finish out the season. In a reversal of luck from the previous season, the Ravens won their Week 17 game against a resurgent Cleveland Browns team to hold off the Steelers and clinch the division title. They were defeated by the Los Angeles Chargers in the wild card round of the playoffs. Following the season, Flacco was traded to the Denver Broncos, entrenching Jackson as the starting quarterback, and longtime linebacker C. J. Mosley departed for the New York Jets in free agency.

=== 2019: Lamar Jackson helps team toward home-field advantage throughout playoffs ===
With Lamar Jackson succeeding Flacco at quarterback, the Ravens started off the 2019 season with two straight wins, then two straight losses, and seemed to finish with a mediocre record. However, the Ravens took off from there, acquiring 12 straight victories to finish with a 14–2 record, the team's best since their establishment in 1996, surpassing the team's previous best of 13 wins in 2006. The Ravens were also the only team to score at least 20 points in all their regular season games. Also, Lamar Jackson broke the single-season record for most rushing yards by a quarterback with 1,206, previously held by Falcons quarterback Michael Vick in the 2006 season. However, their season would come to an abrupt end at the hands of the Tennessee Titans in the AFC Divisional Playoffs, 28–12.

=== 2020 ===
After their stellar 2019 season, the Ravens acquired star players like Patrick Queen and J. K. Dobbins in the 2020 draft. The 2020 season would be a back-and-forth affair. Despite going 5–1 heading into their bye week, the Ravens would lose four of their next five games, including a shocking loss to the Patriots that ended their record streak at 31 for most consecutive regular season games in which a team scored at least 20 points, with the addition of a Week 12 game against the Steelers that was originally planned to be played on Thanksgiving night, but was postponed to the following Wednesday due to a COVID-19 outbreak within the Ravens organization. After the outbreak cleared, the Ravens went back into their prime, winning their final five games, including a 47–42 Monday Night thriller against the Browns in which Lamar Jackson left the game in the middle of the third quarter, which erased a 34–20 lead that the Ravens had over the Browns, but returned after the two-minute warning to throw a touchdown pass on his first play back to Marquise Brown to keep it alive. The Ravens overall finished 11–5 and secured a wild card berth in the playoffs, defeating the Titans in the wild card round 20–13 to avenge the previous year's divisional round, but fell to the Bills the following week, 17–3.

=== 2021 ===
The 2021 Ravens had their first 0–1 start since 2015 after blowing multiple fourth quarter leads on the road against the Las Vegas Raiders before losing in overtime to the Raiders 33–27. They would later rebound to win 5 straight games which included a record-breaking 66-yard field goal by Justin Tucker in Week 3 against the Detroit Lions in which the Ravens won 19–17. However, despite starting the season 8–3, the Ravens suffered a late-season collapse, ending the season with a brutal six game losing streak in which five of the losses were by a combined 8 points, including two of the five losses as a result of a failed two-point conversion late in the fourth quarter, and failed to improve on their 11–5 record from last season after a Week 15 loss to the Green Bay Packers. The Ravens also suffered their first losing season since 2015, finished last place in the AFC North for the first time since 2007, and failed to qualify for the postseason for the first time since 2017 after a loss to the Steelers in Week 18. They finished with an 8–9 record. It was the first time in the Lamar Jackson era that the Ravens failed to qualify for the postseason. The Ravens suffered many injuries to key players throughout the season, including losing J. K. Dobbins, Gus Edwards, Justice Hill, L. J. Fort, and Marcus Peters to season-ending injuries before the regular season started, and losing Ronnie Stanley, Marlon Humphrey, Derek Wolfe, DeShon Elliott and more during the season, while quarterback Lamar Jackson missed the final four games of the season due to an ankle injury.

=== 2022 ===
The Ravens improved on their 8–9 record from last season to finish at 10–7 and returned to the playoffs after a one-year absence and earned the AFC's No. 6 seed before losing 24–17 to the Cincinnati Bengals in the Wild Card Round. However, this was also the first season in franchise history that the Ravens went the entire season without scoring a defensive touchdown.

Injuries on offense again plagued the Ravens for the second straight year, despite it resulting in a playoff appearance. RBs Gus Edwards and J. K. Dobbins missed time during the season, WR Rashod Bateman sustained a season-ending injury in Week 8, and WR Devin Duvernay also sustained a season-ending injury late in the season. QB Lamar Jackson also suffered a knee injury in Week 13. Although it was initially expected to be a short-term injury, he missed the rest of the season. The offense was severely hampered with backup Tyler Huntley under center and the Ravens did not score more than 17 points in any game he started, although Huntley was selected to the Pro Bowl as an injury replacement. The Ravens also had trouble closing out games; they blew four games where they led by at least ten points, including three in the first six weeks of the season; two of which were by 17 or more points.

=== 2023 ===
The Ravens improved on their 10–7 record from last season and they would later finish at 13–4 to win their first AFC North title since 2019, also earning the AFC's No. 1 seed of the playoffs after their 56–19 blowout win over the Miami Dolphins. The Ravens blew out the Houston Texans 34–10 in the Divisional Round. This win would allow the Ravens to host the AFC Championship Game for the first time in franchise history. This would also become the first AFC Championship Game hosted by the city of Baltimore since January 1971. However after becoming heavy Super Bowl favorites, the Ravens season would come to an end as they lost to the defending and eventual Super Bowl champion Kansas City Chiefs 17–10.

=== 2024 ===
The Ravens started 0–2 for the first time since 2015, but went 12–3 the rest of the way to finish the season 12–5. With Lamar Jackson's five touchdown performance in the Ravens win in Week 7, the Ravens became the first team in NFL history with players winning Offensive Player of the Week in four consecutive weeks (Derrick Henry won the honor in week 4 and 6 while Lamar Jackson won the honor for week 5 and 7). Following a Week 16 victory against the AFC North rival Pittsburgh Steelers, the Ravens clinched a playoff spot for the third consecutive season and their sixth in seven years. In Week 18, they won the AFC North title for the second year in a row with a 35–10 blowout win over the Cleveland Browns.

The Ravens defeated the Pittsburgh Steelers 28–14 in the Wild Card round. However, in heartbreaking fashion, the Ravens lost to the Buffalo Bills 27–25, ending their hopes of a Super Bowl appearance.

=== 2025 ===
The Ravens started their season 2–5 but they pushed it out until the final game that decided if they were going to the 2025 NFL playoffs and be the AFC North North division champions. They lost that game in a heartbreaking loss of 24–26 against the Pittsburgh Steelers on January 4, 2026 and missing the 2025 NFL playoffs and ending their season with a record of 8–9. Two days later, on January 6, 2026, head coach John Harbaugh was fired after the season ended as he complied with a record of 180-113.
