= Herman Arvie =

American football player (born 1970)

No. 70, 73
- Position: Offensive tackle

Personal information
- Born: October 12, 1970 (age 56); Opelousas, Louisiana, U.S.
- Listed height: 6 ft 4 in (1.93 m)
- Listed weight: 305 lb (138 kg)

Career information
- High school: Opelousas (LA)
- College: Grambling State
- NFL draft: 1993: 5th round, 124th overall pick

Career history
- Cleveland Browns (1993–1995); Baltimore Ravens (1996)

Career NFL statistics
- Games: 62
- Games started: 4
- Touchdowns: 1
- Stats at Pro Football Reference

Herman Joseph Arvie (born October 12, 1970) is an American former professional football player who played four seasons in the National Football League (NFL) as an offensive tackle with the Cleveland Browns and Baltimore Ravens. Arvie was drafted by the Browns out of Grambling State University in the fifth round of the 1993 NFL draft. Arvie played three seasons with the Browns before the franchise moved to Baltimore and became the Baltimore Ravens. With the Ravens in 1996, Arvie scored his only touchdown, scoring on a one-yard reception. After the 1996 season, Arvie retired from football. Inducted into the Grambling Legends Sports Hall of Fame in 2024.
