= Elliott Fortune =

American football player (born 1974)

No. 91
- Position: Defensive end

Personal information
- Born: May 28, 1974 (age 52); Roosevelt, New York, U.S.
- Listed height: 6 ft 4 in (1.93 m)
- Listed weight: 275 lb (125 kg)

Career information
- High school: Roosevelt (NY)
- College: Georgia Tech
- NFL draft: 1995: undrafted

Career history
- Cleveland Browns (1995); Baltimore Ravens (1996); Green Bay Packers (1997)*; New Jersey Red Dogs (2000); Milwaukee Mustangs (2001); Carolina Cobras (2002); New York Dragons (2002–2003)
- * Offseason or practice squad member only
- Stats at Pro Football Reference
- Stats at ArenaFan.com

Elliott David Fortune (born May 28, 1974) is a former player in the National Football League (NFL). He played for the Baltimore Ravens in 1996. He played collegiality for the Georgia Tech football team.
