= List of Houston Texans team records =

This article details statistics relating to the Houston Texans American football team.

== Houston Texans records ==
=== Team records ===
- Wins: 12 (2012, 2025)
- Home wins: 7 (2016)
- Road wins: 6 (2012)
- Consecutive wins: 9 (2018, 2025)
- Consecutive losses: 14 (2013)
- Most points for: 416 (2012)
- Fewest points allowed: 278 (2011)
- Touchdowns: 46 (2012)
- Most points scored in a game at home: 57 vs. Titans (Oct 1, 2017)
- Most points scored in a game on road: 44 at Ravens (Oct 5, 2025)
- Most points allowed in a game at home: 45 vs. Chiefs (Nov 20, 2005)
- Most points allowed in a game on road: 49 at Colts (Nov 14, 2004)
- Most points scored by both teams in a game at home: 85 Texans (53) vs. Falcons (32) (Oct 6, 2019)
- Most points scored by both teams in a game on road: 79 Texans (38) at Seahawks (41) (Oct 29, 2017)
- Fewest points scored by both teams in a game at home: 16 Texans (3) vs. Titans (13) (Dec 29, 2002)
- Fewest points scored by both teams in a game on road: 16 Texans (10) at Bengals (6) (Nov 16, 2015)
- Most points scored in a playoffs game: 45 vs. Browns (Jan 13, 2024)
- Fewest points scored in a playoffs game: 0 vs. Chiefs (Jan 9, 2016)
- Most points allowed in a playoffs game: 51 at Chiefs (Jan 12, 2020)
- Fewest points allowed in a playoffs game: 6 at Steelers (Jan 12, 2026)
- Most points scored by both teams in a playoffs game: 82 Texans (31) at Chiefs (51) (Jan 12, 2020)
- Fewest points scored by both teams in a playoffs game: 28 Texans (7) vs. Colts (21) (Jan 5, 2019)
- Biggest comeback: 21 vs. Chargers (Sep 9, 2013)
- Biggest lead blown: 24 at Chiefs (Jan 12, 2020, Playoffs)

=== All-time franchise individual records ===
- Most consecutive starts: 171 Jon Weeks
- Most games played: 171 Jon Weeks
- Most consecutive snaps: 3,884 Chester Pitts
- Completions: 1,951 Matt Schaub
- Attempts: 3,020 Matt Schaub
- Completion percentage: 65.6% Sage Rosenfels
- Passing yards: 23,221 Matt Schaub
- Passing yards per game: 258.0 Matt Schaub
- Passing yards per attempt: 8.0 Ryan Fitzpatrick
- Passing touchdowns: 124 Matt Schaub
- Passer rating: 90.9 Matt Schaub
- Rushing attempts: 1,454 Arian Foster
- Rushing yards: 6,472 Arian Foster
- Rushing average: 4.7 Ben Tate
- Rushing touchdowns: 54 Arian Foster
- Most games, 100 or more yards rushing: 32 Arian Foster
- Rushing yards per game: 85.2 Arian Foster
- Receptions: 1,012 Andre Johnson
- Receiving yards: 13,597 Andre Johnson
- Receiving yards per reception: 16.4 André Davis
- Receiving touchdowns: 64 Andre Johnson
- Most games, 100 or more yards receiving: 51 Andre Johnson
- Receptions per game: 6.0 Andre Johnson
- Receiving yards per game: 80.5 Andre Johnson
- Total touchdowns: 68 Arian Foster
- Yards from scrimmage: 13,651 Andre Johnson
- Total points: 767 Kris Brown
- Quarterback sacks: 101 J. J. Watt
- Total tackles: 658 Brian Cushing
- Solo tackles: 479 DeMeco Ryans
- Assists on tackles: 238 Brian Cushing
- Pass interceptions: 16 Kareem Jackson & Johnathan Joseph
- Pass interception return yards: 410 Johnathan Joseph
- Pass interception touchdown returns: 4 Johnathan Joseph
- Passes defended: 117 Johnathan Joseph
- Forced fumbles: 23 J. J. Watt
- Fumble recoveries: 15 J. J. Watt
- Fumble return yards: 102 DeMeco Ryans
- Forced fumble touchdown returns: 1 (13 players)
- Safeties: 1 (7 players)
- Kick returns: 117 J.J. Moses
- Kick return yards: 2,743 André Davis
- Kick return average: 28.5 Jerome Mathis
- Kick return touchdowns: 3 Jerome Mathis & André Davis
- Punt returns: 179 Jacoby Jones
- Punt return yards: 1,820 Jacoby Jones
- Punt return average: 15.0 Will Fuller
- Punt return touchdowns: 3 Jacoby Jones
- Field goals made: 244 Ka'imi Fairbairn
- Field goals attempted: 280 Ka'imi Fairbairn
- Field goal percentage: 87.1% Ka'imi Fairbairn
- Punts: 437 Chad Stanley
- Punting yards: 17,908 Chad Stanley
- Punting average: 47.2 Shane Lechler & Donnie Jones

(through 2026 season)

=== Single-season individual records ===
- Passing attempts: 583 Matt Schaub (2009)
- Passing completions: 396 Matt Schaub (2009)
- Completion percentage: 70.2% Deshaun Watson (2020)
- Passing yards: 4,823 Deshaun Watson (2020)
- Passing yards (rookie): 4,108 C. J. Stroud (2023)
- Passer rating: 112.4 Deshaun Watson (2020)
- Passing touchdowns: 33 Deshaun Watson (2020)
- Passing touchdowns (rookie): 23 C. J. Stroud (2023)
- Passing interceptions: 16 Brock Osweiler (2016)
- Rushing attempts: 351 Arian Foster (2012)
- Rushing yards: 1,616 Arian Foster (2010)
- Rushing average: 5.4 Ben Tate (2011)
- Rushing touchdowns: 16 Arian Foster (2010)
- Most games, 100 or more yards rushing: 9 Arian Foster (2011)
- Receptions by a running back: 68 Domanick Davis (2004)
- Receiving yards by a running back: 617 Arian Foster (2011)
- Receiving touchdowns by a running back: 5 Arian Foster (2014)
- Receptions by a tight end: 70 Owen Daniels (2008)
- Receiving yards by a tight end: 862 Owen Daniels (2008)
- Receiving touchdowns by a tight end: 7 Darren Fells (2019)
- Receptions: 115 DeAndre Hopkins (2018) & Andre Johnson (2008)
- Receiving yards: 1,598 Andre Johnson (2012)
- Receiving average ((minimum 32 receptions)): 17.7 André Davis (2007)
- Receiving touchdowns: 13 DeAndre Hopkins (2017)
- Most games, 100 or more yards receiving: 8 Andre Johnson (2008)
- Yards from scrimmage: 2,220 Arian Foster (2010)
- Total touchdowns: 18 Arian Foster (2010)
- Total points: 160 Kaʻimi Fairbairn (2025)
- Quarterback sacks: 20.5 J. J. Watt (2012 & 2014)
- Interceptions: 7 Marcus Coleman (2003)
- Tackles: 166 Jamie Sharper (2003)
- Touchdowns by a defensive player: 5 J. J. Watt (2014)
- Kick returns: 59 J. J. Moses (2004)
- Kickoff return yards: 1,542 Jerome Mathis (2005)
- Kickoff return average: 30.3 André Davis (2007)
- Kickoff return touchdowns: 3 André Davis (2007)
- Punt returns: 49 Jacoby Jones (2011)
- Punt return yards: 518 Jacoby Jones (2011)
- Punt return average: 15.0 Will Fuller (2016)
- Punt return touchdowns: 2 Jacoby Jones (2008)
- Field goals: 44 Kaʻimi Fairbairn (2025)
- Field goal attempts: 48 Kaʻimi Fairbairn (2025)
- Field goal percentage: 90.0% Neil Rackers (2010)
- Punts: 114 Chad Stanley (2002)
- Punting yards: 4,720 Chad Stanley (2002)
- Punting average: 47.6 Shane Lechler (2013)

=== Single-game individual records ===
- Passing yards: 527 Matt Schaub (Nov 18, 2012 vs Jaguars)
- Passing yards (rookie): 470 C. J. Stroud (NFL Record) (Nov 5, 2023 vs Buccaneers)
- Passing touchdowns: 6 Ryan Fitzpatrick (Nov 30, 2014 vs Titans)
- Passing touchdowns (rookie): 5 Deshaun Watson (Oct 8, 2017 vs Chiefs), C. J. Stroud (Nov 5, 2023 vs Buccaneers)
- Passing completions: 43 Matt Schaub (Nov 18, 2012 vs Jaguars)
- Passing attempts: 62 Matt Schaub (Dec 13, 2010 vs Ravens)
- Most consecutive pass completions: 22 David Carr (Nov 19, 2006 vs Bills)
- Passer rating: 158.3 Deshaun Watson (Oct 6, 2019 vs Falcons)
- Rushing attempts: 36 Alfred Blue (Nov 16, 2014 vs Browns)
- Rushing yards: 231 Arian Foster (Sep 12, 2010 vs Colts)
- Rushing touchdowns: 3 Ben Tate (Dec 1, 2013 vs Patriots), Arian Foster (Sep 12, 2010 vs Colts) & Ryan Moats (Nov 1, 2009 vs Bills)
- Receptions: 14 Andre Johnson (Nov 18, 2012 vs Jaguars) & Will Fuller V (Oct 6, 2019 vs Falcons)
- Receiving yards: 273 Andre Johnson (Nov 18, 2012 vs Jaguars)
- Receiving touchdowns: 3 Andre Johnson (Nov 3, 2013 vs Colts) & DeAndre Hopkins (Oct 8, 2017 vs Chiefs) & Will Fuller V (Oct 6, 2019 vs Falcons)
- Interceptions: 3 Glover Quin (Nov 28, 2010 vs Titans)
- Quarterback sacks: 4 Connor Barwin (Nov 27, 2011 vs Jaguars)
- Tackles: 19 Kamu Grugier-Hill (Dec 5, 2021 vs Colts)
- Longest rushing play: 97 yards (Touchdown) Lamar Miller (Nov 26, 2018 vs Titans)
- Longest pass play: 81 yards David Carr to Corey Bradford (Oct 13, 2002 vs Bills)
- Longest touchdown pass: 80 yards Matt Schaub to Jacoby Jones (Nov 13, 2011 at Buccaneers)
- Longest kick return: 104 yards (Touchdown) André Davis (Dec 30, 2007 vs Jaguars)
- Longest punt return: 87 yards (Touchdown) Keshawn Martin (Nov 17, 2013 vs Raiders)
- Most kick return touchdowns: 2 (Tied for NFL Record) André Davis (Dec 30, 2007 vs Jaguars)
- Longest interception return: 102 yards (Touchdown) Marcus Coleman (Sep 26, 2004 at Chiefs)
- Longest punt: 71 yards Shane Lechler (Oct 9, 2014 vs Colts) & Bryan Anger (Sep 29, 2019 vs Panthers)
- Longest field goal: 61 yards Kaʻimi Fairbairn (Dec 12, 2021 vs Seahawks)

=== One half records ===
- Most total yards by a team: 365 (Oct 6, 2019 vs. Falcons) (2nd half)
- Most total yards allowed: 392 (Oct 25, 2015 at Dolphins) (1st half)
- Most total yards by a team playoffs: 286 (Jan 13, 2024 vs. Browns) (1st half)
- Most total yards allowed playoffs: 277 (Jan 5, 2019 vs. Colts) (1st half)
- Fewest total yards by a team: -4 (Oct 23, 2005 vs. Colts) (2nd half)
- Fewest total yards allowed: 24 (Oct 1, 2017 vs. Titans) (2nd half)
- Fewest total yards by a team playoffs: 68 (Jan 20, 2024 at Ravens) (2nd half)
- Fewest total yards allowed playoffs: 53 (Jan 5, 2013 vs. Bengals) (1st half)
- Fewest first downs: 1 (Dec 8, 2002 at Steelers) (2nd half)
- Most field goals: 4 Kris Brown (Oct 7, 2007 vs. Dolphins) (2nd half), Ka'imi Fairbairn (Nov 2, 2025 vs. Broncos) (1st half)
- Most field goals attempts: 5 Ka'imi Fairbairn (Nov 2, 2025 vs. Broncos) (1st half)
- Most field goals attempts by both teams: 6 Texans (5) vs. Broncos (1) (Nov 2, 2025) (1st half)
- Most touchdowns scored by a team: 5 (Oct 6, 2019 vs. Falcons) (2nd half)
- Most touchdowns allowed: 6 (Oct 25, 2015 at Dolphins) (1st half)
- Most touchdowns by both teams: 7 Texans (4) vs. Titans (3) (Jan 3, 2021) (2nd half), Texans (5) vs. Falcons (2) (Oct 9, 2019) (2nd half)
- Most passing touchdowns: 4 Sage Rosenfels (Oct 21, 2007 vs. Titans) (2nd half)
- Most fumbles by a player: 3 David Carr (Oct 23, 2005 vs. Colts) (2nd half), (Nov 6, 2005 at Jaguars) (2nd half), (Dec 3, 2006 at Raiders) (1st half), Sage Rosenfels (Oct 5, 2008 vs. Colts) (2nd half), Brock Osweiler (Oct 24, 2016 at Broncos) (2nd half)
- Most fumbles by a player playoffs: 3 C. J. Stroud (Jan 12, 2026 at Steelers) (1st half)
- Most points in first half at home: 34 (Sep 11, 2011 vs. Colts)
- Most points in first half on road: 27 (Dec 27, 2009 at Dolphins)
- Most points in second half at home: 37 (Oct 6, 2019 vs. Falcons)
- Most points in second half on road: 27 (Oct 13, 2024 at Patriots)
- Most points allowed in first half at home: 31 (Nov 20, 2005 vs. Chiefs), (Dec 8, 2019 vs. Broncos)
- Most points allowed in first half on road: 41 (Oct 25, 2015 at Dolphins)
- Most points allowed in second half at home: 29 (Nov 9, 2008 vs. Ravens)
- Most points allowed in second half on road: 31 (Oct 15, 2006 at Cowboys)
- Most points in first half by both teams at home: 45 Texans (21) vs. Bills (24) (Sep 13, 2026)
- Most points in first half by both teams on road: 48 Texans (24) at Titans (24) (Sep 20, 2009)
- Most points in second half by both teams at home: 53 Texans (29) vs. Titans (24) (Jan 3, 2021), 52 Texans (37) vs. Falcons (15) (Oct 9, 2019)
- Most points in second half by both teams on road: 47 Texans (17) at Saints (30) (Sep 25, 2011)
- Fewest points in first half by both teams: 0 (Dec 10, 2023 at Jets)
- Fewest points in second half by both teams: 2 Texans (0) vs. Colts (2) (Dec 6, 2020)
- Most points in first half playoffs: 24 (Jan 13, 2024 vs. Browns)
- Most points in second half playoffs: 23 (Jan 12, 2026 at Steelers)
- Most points allowed in first half playoffs: 28 (Jan 12, 2020 at Chiefs)
- Most points allowed in second half playoffs: 24 (Jan 13, 2013 at Patriots), (Jan 20, 2024 at Ravens)
- Most points in first half by both teams playoffs: 52 Texans (24) at Chiefs (28) (Jan 12, 2020)
- Most points in second half by both teams playoffs: 39 Texans (15) at Patriots (24) (Jan 13, 2013)
- Fewest points in first half by both teams playoffs: 13 Texans (0) vs. Chiefs (13) (Jan 9, 2016), Texans (0) vs. Bills (13) (Jan 4, 2020), Texans (7) at Steelers (6) (Jan 12, 2026)
- Fewest points in second half by both teams playoffs: 3 Texans (0) at Ravens (3) (Jan 15, 2012)
- Most touchdowns scored by a team: 3 (Jan 12, 2020 at Chiefs) (1st half), (Jan 13, 2024 vs. Browns) (1st and 2nd half), (Jan 12, 2026 at Steelers) (2nd half)
- Most touchdowns allowed: 4 (Jan 12, 2020 at Chiefs) (1st half)
- Most touchdowns scored by both teams: 7 Texans (3) at Chiefs (4) (Jan 12, 2020) (1st half)
- Most passing touchdowns allowed playoffs: 4 Patrick Mahomes (Jan 12, 2020 at Chiefs) (1st half)
- Most touchdowns scored by an opponent playoffs: 3 Travis Kelce (Jan 12, 2020 at Chiefs) (1st half)
- Most receiving touchdowns by an opponent playoffs: 3 Travis Kelce (Jan 12, 2020 at Chiefs) (1st half)

=== One quarter records ===
- Most total yards by a team: 253 (Oct 21, 2007 vs. Titans) (4th quarter)
- Most total yards allowed: 244 (Dec 9, 2018 vs. Colts) (2nd quarter)
- Most total yards by a team playoffs: 173 (Jan 11, 2025 vs. Chargers) (2nd quarter)
- Most total yards allowed playoffs: 164 (Jan 13, 2013 at Patriots) (2nd quarter)
- Fewest total yards by a team: -17 (Oct 23, 2005 vs. Colts) (4th quarter)
- Fewest total yards allowed: -9 (Sep 13, 2003 vs. Jets) (1st quarter)
- Fewest total yards by a team playoffs: 25 (Jan 4, 2020 vs. Bills) (2nd quarter)
- Fewest total yards allowed playoffs: 15 (Jan 7, 2017 vs. Raiders) (3rd quarter), (Jan 12, 2026 at Steelers) (2nd quarter)
- Most field goals: 3 Kris Brown (Dec 4, 2005 vs. Ravens) (4th quarter), (Dec 3, 2006 at Raiders) (4th quarter), Ka'imi Fairbairn (Oct 20, 2019 at Colts) (2nd quarter), (Nov 2, 2025 vs. Broncos) (2nd quarter)
- Most field goals by both teams: 5 Texans (2) vs. Chiefs (3) (Sep 18, 2016) (4th quarter)
- Most fumbles by a player: 3 David Carr (Oct 23, 2005 vs. Colts) (4th quarter), (Dec 3, 2006 at Raiders) (2nd quarter)
- Most fumbles by a player playoffs: 2 C. J. Stroud (Jan 12, 2026 at Steelers) (2nd quarter)
- Most passing touchdowns: 4 Sage Rosenfels (Oct 21, 2007 vs. Titans) (4th quarter)
- Most touchdowns scored by a team: 4 (Oct 21, 2007 vs. Titans) (4th quarter), (Nov 9, 2025 vs. Jaguars) (4th quarter)
- Most touchdowns allowed: 3 (25 times)
- Most touchdowns scored by both teams: 5 (Six times)
  - Texans (3) at Colts (2) (Sep 17, 2006) (4th quarter)
  - Texans (2) at Saints (3) (Sep 25, 2011) (4th quarter)
  - Texans (3) vs. Chiefs (2) (Oct 8, 2017) (4th quarter)
  - Texans (3) vs. Falcons (2) (Oct 9, 2019) (4th quarter)
  - Texans (3) vs. Chargers (2) (Dec 26, 2021) (4th quarter)
  - Texans (2) vs. Bills (3) (Sep 13, 2026) (2nd quarter)
- Most points in first quarter at home: 17 (Dec 13, 2009 vs. Seahawks), (Sep 11, 2011 vs. Colts), (Dec 14, 2025 vs. Cardinals)
- Most points in first quarter on road: 14 (Ten times)
  - (Dec 8, 2002 at Steelers)
  - (Oct 3, 2010 at Raiders)
  - (Dec 2, 2012 at Titans)
  - (Sep 14, 2014 at Raiders)
  - (Nov 13, 2016 at Jaguars)
  - (Sep 30, 2018 at Colts)
  - (Dec 19, 2021 at Jaguars)
  - (Oct 13, 2024 at Patriots)
  - (Nov 18, 2024 at Cowboys)
  - (Dec 27, 2025 at Chargers)
- Most points in second quarter at home: 24 (Dec 18, 2005 vs. Cardinals), (Sep 9, 2012 vs. Dolphins)
- Most points in second quarter on road: 20 (Oct 13, 2019 at Chiefs)
- Most points in third quarter at home: 19 (Jan 3, 2021 vs. Titans)
- Most points in third quarter on road: 17 (Dec 27, 2015 at Titans)
- Most points in fourth quarter at home: 29 (Oct 21, 2007 vs. Titans)
- Most points in fourth quarter on road: 22 (Nov 1, 2009 at Bills)
- Most points allowed in first quarter at home: 24 (Oct 9, 2014 vs. Colts)
- Most points allowed in first quarter on road: 21 (Dec 19, 2010 at Titans), (Oct 25, 2015 at Dolphins)
- Most points allowed in second quarter at home: 21 (Nov 20, 2005 vs. Chiefs), (Jan 9, 2022 vs. Titans), (Sep 13, 2026 vs. Bills)
- Most points allowed in second quarter on road: 24 (Oct 20, 2014 at Steelers), (Dec 17, 2017 at Jaguars)
- Most points allowed in third quarter at home: 21 (Oct 13, 2013 vs. Rams)
- Most points allowed in third quarter on road: 21 (Nov 14, 2004 at Colts), (Nov 12, 2017 at Rams)
- Most points allowed in fourth quarter at home: 22 (Nov 9, 2008 vs. Ravens)
- Most points allowed in fourth quarter on road: 23 (Sep 25, 2011 at Saints)
- Most points in first quarter by both teams at home: 24 (Three times)
  - Texans (10) vs. Chargers (14) (Nov 7, 2010)
  - Texans (0) vs. Colts (24) (Oct 9, 2014)
  - Texans (10) vs. Colts (14) (Dec 6, 2020)
- Most points in first quarter by both teams on road: 28 Texans (14) at Seahawks (14) (Oct 29, 2017)
- Most points in second quarter by both teams at home: 35 Texans (14) vs. Bills (21) (Sep 13, 2026)
- Most points in second quarter by both teams on road: 30 Texans (6) at Steelers (24) (Oct 20, 2014), Texans (16) at Packers (14) (Oct 20, 2024)
- Most points in third quarter by both teams at home: 33 Texans (19) vs. Titans (14) (Jan 3, 2021)
- Most points in third quarter by both teams on road: 28 Texans (7) at Colts (21) (Nov 14, 2004)
- Most points in fourth quarter by both teams at home: 40 Texans (21) vs. Chiefs (19) (Oct 8, 2017)
- Most points in fourth quarter by both teams on road: 37 Texans (14) at Saints (23) (Sep 25, 2011)
- Most points in first quarter playoffs: 21 (Jan 12, 2020 at Chiefs)
- Most points in second quarter playoffs: 14 (Jan 13, 2024 vs. Browns)
- Most points in third quarter playoffs: 14 (Jan 13, 2024 vs. Browns)
- Most points in fourth quarter playoffs: 23 (Jan 12, 2026 at Steelers)
- Most points allowed in first quarter playoffs: 17 (Jan 15, 2012 at Ravens)
- Most points allowed in second quarter playoffs: 28 (Jan 12, 2020 at Chiefs)
- Most points allowed in third quarter playoffs: 14 (Jan 13, 2013 at Patriots)
- Most points allowed in fourth quarter playoffs: 17 (Jan 20, 2024 at Ravens)
- Most points in first quarter by both teams playoffs: 21 Texans (21) at Chiefs (0) (Jan 12, 2020)
- Most points in second quarter by both teams playoffs: 31 Texans (3) at Chiefs (28) (Jan 12, 2020)
- Most points in third quarter by both teams playoffs: 14 Texans (0) at Patriots (14) (Jan 13, 2013), Texans (14) vs. Browns (0) (Jan 13, 2024)
- Most points in fourth quarter by both teams playoffs: 25 Texans (15) at Patriots (10) (Jan 13, 2013)
- Most touchdowns scored by a team playoffs: 3 (Jan 12, 2020 at Chiefs) (1st quarter), (Jan 12, 2026 at Steelers) (4th quarter)
- Most touchdowns allowed playoffs: 4 (Jan 12, 2020 at Chiefs) (2nd quarter)
- Most touchdowns scored by both teams playoffs: 4 Texans (0) at Chiefs (4) (Jan 12, 2020) (2nd quarter)
- Most passing touchdowns allowed playoffs: 4 Patrick Mahomes (Jan 12, 2020 at Chiefs) (2nd quarter)
- Most touchdowns scored by an opponent playoffs: 3 Travis Kelce (Jan 12, 2020 at Chiefs) (2nd quarter)
- Most receiving touchdowns by an opponent playoffs: 3 Travis Kelce (Jan 12, 2020 at Chiefs) (2nd quarter)

== Season-by-season win and loss records ==
The Texans have competed in the NFL since their inaugural season in 2002. In that time, the team has compiled 6 winning seasons, finishing 9–7 in 2009, 10–6 in 2011, 12–4 in 2012 and 9-7 in 2014, 2015, and 2016. They have also had two non-losing seasons, as they finished 8–8 in 2007 and 2008.

The Texans first reached the post-season in 2011 as the AFC South champion and repeated as division champs in 2012, 2015, and 2016. As of 2017, they are one of four active NFL teams that have yet to appear in a Super Bowl, along with the Cleveland Browns, Detroit Lions, and Jacksonville Jaguars.
