= List of Houston Texans award winners =

The following is a list of individual player awards and accomplishments for the Houston Texans franchise of the National Football League.

== League-wide awards ==
=== Associated Press Defensive Player of the Year Award recipients ===
The following is a list of all Houston Texans players who have been named the National Football League defensive player of the year by the Associated Press.

Season	Player	Position
2012	J. J. Watt	DE
2014	J. J. Watt (2)	DE
2015	J. J. Watt (3)	DE

=== All-Pro selections ===
The following is a list of all Houston Texans players named to the Associated Press All-Pro first or second teams.

Season	Player	Position	Team
2005	Jerome Mathis	KR	1st
2006	Andre Johnson	WR	2nd
2007	DeMeco Ryans; Mario Williams	LB; DE	2nd 2nd
2008	Andre Johnson	WR	1st
2009	Andre Johnson	WR	1st
2010	Arian Foster; Vonta Leach	RB; FB	1st 1st
2011	Duane Brown; Brian Cushing; Arian Foster; Johnathan Joseph	OT; LB; RB; CB	2nd 2nd 2nd 2nd
2012	Duane Brown; Andre Johnson; J. J. Watt	OT; WR; DE	1st 2nd 1st
2013	J. J. Watt	DE	1st
2014	J. J. Watt	DE	1st
2015	DeAndre Hopkins; J. J. Watt	WR; DE	2nd 1st
2016	Jadeveon Clowney Benardrick McKinney Whitney Mercilus	DE LB LB	2nd 2nd 2nd
2017	DeAndre Hopkins	WR	1st
2018	DeAndre Hopkins; J. J. Watt J. J. Watt	WR; DE DT	1st 1st 2nd
2019	DeAndre Hopkins	WR	1st

=== Associated Press Rookie of the Year Award recipients ===
The following is a list of all Houston Texans players who have been named either the National Football League offensive or defensive rookie of the year by the Associated Press.

Season	Player	Position
2006	DeMeco Ryans	LB
2009	Brian Cushing	LB
2023	C. J. Stroud	QB
2023	Will Anderson Jr.	DE

=== Pro Bowl selections ===
The following is a list of all Houston Texans players selected to the Pro Bowl.

Season	Player	Position
2002	Aaron Glenn; Gary Walker	CB; DT
2004	Andre Johnson	WR
2005	Jerome Mathis	KR
2006	Andre Johnson (2)	WR
2007	DeMeco Ryans	LB
2008	Owen Daniels; Andre Johnson (3); Mario Williams	TE; WR; DE
2009	Brian Cushing; Andre Johnson (4); DeMeco Ryans (2); Matt Schaub; Mario Williams (2)	LB; WR; LB; QB; DE
2010	Arian Foster; Andre Johnson (5); Vonta Leach	RB; WR; FB
2011	Arian Foster (2); Johnathan Joseph; Chris Myers; Antonio Smith	RB; CB; C DE
2012	Duane Brown; Owen Daniels (2); Arian Foster (3); Andre Johnson (6); Johnathan Joseph (2); Chris Myers (2); Matt Schaub (2); Wade Smith; J. J. Watt	OT; TE; RB; WR; CB; C QB; G DE
2013	Duane Brown (2); Andre Johnson (7); J. J. Watt (2)	OT; WR; DE
2014	Duane Brown (3); Arian Foster (4); J. J. Watt (3)	OT; RB; DE
2015	DeAndre Hopkins; J. J. Watt (4); Jon Weeks	WR; DE; LS
2016	Jadeveon Clowney	DE
2017	Duane Brown (4) Jadeveon Clowney (2) DeAndre Hopkins (2)	OT DE WR
2018	Jadeveon Clowney (3) DeAndre Hopkins (3) Benardrick McKinney Lamar Miller Deshaun Watson J. J. Watt (5)	DE WR LB RB QB DE
2019	DeAndre Hopkins (4) Laremy Tunsil Deshaun Watson (2)	WR OT QB
2020	Laremy Tunsil (2) Deshaun Watson (3)	OT QB
2022	Laremy Tunsil (3)	OT
2023	Laremy Tunsil (4)	OT

=== Pro Bowl MVP Award selections ===
The following Houston Texans players have been named the most valuable player of the Pro Bowl.

Year	Player	Position
2009	Matt Schaub	QB
2015	J. J. Watt (Defensive)	DE

=== Pepsi NFL Rookie of the Year Award recipients ===
The following is a list of all Houston Texans players who have been named the Pepsi NFL rookie of the year.

Season	Player	Position
2003	Domanick Davis	RB

== Team awards ==
=== Houston Texans MVP recipients ===
The following is a list of Houston Texans players who have been named the most valuable player of the team as determined by a vote of Texans players at the conclusion of each season.

Season	Player	Position
2005	Domanick Davis	RB
2006	Andre Johnson	WR
2007	DeMeco Ryans	LB
2008	Andre Johnson	WR
2009	Andre Johnson	WR
2010	Arian Foster; Andre Johnson	RB; WR
2011	Brian Cushing	LB
2012	J. J. Watt	DE
2013	Andre Johnson	WR
2014	J. J. Watt	DE

=== Houston Texans Rookie of the Year recipients ===
The following is a list of Houston Texans players who have been named rookie of the year as determined by a vote of Texans players at the conclusion of each season.

Season	Player	Position
2004	Dunta Robinson	CB
2005	Jerome Mathis	WR
2006	DeMeco Ryans	LB
2007	Fred Bennett	CB
2008	Steve Slaton	RB
2009	Brian Cushing	LB
2010	Earl Mitchell	DT
2011	J. J. Watt	DE
2012	Ben Jones	G
2013	DeAndre Hopkins	WR
2014	Alfred Blue	RB

=== Spirit of the Bull Award recipients ===
The following is a list of Houston Texans players who have been named by the team as the recipient of the Spirit of the Bull Award. This is an annual award given by the team to the Texans player who best exemplifies a commitment to excellence both on and off the field, as well as their charitable work in the Houston community.

Season	Player	Position
2011	DeMeco Ryans	LB
2012	Andre Johnson	WR
2013	Matt Schaub	QB
2014	J. J. Watt	DE
2015	Duane Brown	OT

=== Mark Bruener Award recipients ===
The following is a list of Houston Texans players who have been named by the team as the recipient of the Mark Bruener Award. This is an annual award given by the team to the Texans player who exemplifies outstanding leadership, sportsmanship, work ethic and commitment to his teammates. Until 2008, this award was known as the Spirit of the Bull Award. In 2009 the award was renamed to honor Bruener, who had won the award for four straight years from 2005-2008.

Season	Player	Position
2004	Seth Payne	DT
2005	Mark Bruener	TE
2006	Mark Bruener	TE
2007	Mark Bruener	TE
2008	Mark Bruener	TE
2009	DeMeco Ryans	LB
2010	Chris Myers	C
2011	DeMeco Ryans	LB
2012	Chris Myers	C

=== Ed Block Courage Award recipients ===
The following is a list of Houston Texans players who have been the team recipient of the Ed Block Courage Award. Every year, each of the 32 teams in the National Football League vote for one member of their team who, in the eyes of his teammates, is a source of inspiration and courage.

Season	Player	Position
2002	Jason Bell	CB
2003	Aaron Glenn	CB
2004	Seth Payne	DT
2005	Jabar Gaffney	WR
2006	Kailee Wong	LB
2007	Anthony Weaver	DE
2008	Harry Williams	WR
2009	Zac Diles	LB
2010	Joel Dreessen	TE
2011	DeMeco Ryans	LB
2012	Matt Schaub	QB
2013	Brian Cushing	LB
2014	David Quessenberry	OT
2015	Jadeveon Clowney	LB
