= 2003 Houston Texans season =

2nd season in franchise history

- Owner: Bob McNair
- General manager: Charley Casserly
- Head coach: Dom Capers
- Home stadium: Reliant Stadium

Results
- Record: 5–11
- Division place: 4th AFC South
- Playoffs: Did not qualify
- Pro Bowlers: None

The 2003 Houston Texans season was the franchise's second season in the National Football League and the second under head coach Dom Capers. It saw the Texans make a one-game improvement on its initial season's record.

In the NFL draft, the Texans selected wide receiver Andre Johnson from Miami (FL) third overall. Johnson would become a cornerstone of the Texans' franchise for the next decade and would go on to hold nearly every franchise receiving record. Considered one of the best receivers of his era, Johnson was selected for the Pro Football Hall of Fame in 2024, becoming the first player to start their career with the Texans to be inducted.

== Offseason ==
Additions	Subtractions
G Zach Wiegert (Jaguars)	LB Keith Mitchell (Jaguars)
G Todd Washington (Buccaneers)	WR Jermaine Lewis (Jaguars)
LB Steve Foley (Bengals)	T Ryan Young (Cowboys)
DT Steve Martin (Patriots)	G Cameron Spikes (Cardinals)
RB Stacey Mack (Jaguars)	WR JaJuan Dawson (Colts)

=== NFL draft ===
2003 Houston Texans draft
Round	Pick	Player	Position	College	Notes
1	3	Andre Johnson * ^{†}	WR	Miami (FL)	
2	41	Bennie Joppru	TE	Michigan	from Baltimore via New England
3	67	Antwan Peek	LB	Cincinnati	
3	75	Seth Wand	OT	Northwest Missouri State	from Washington via New England
3	88	Dave Ragone	QB	Louisville	from Atlanta
4	101	Domanick Davis	RB	LSU	
6	192	Drew Henson	QB	Michigan	Extra selection
6	214	Keith Wright	DT	Missouri	Extra selection
7	217	Curry Burns	S	Louisville	
7	233	Chance Pearce	C	Texas A&M	Extra selection
Made roster † Pro Football Hall of Fame * Made at least one Pro Bowl during career

== Staff ==
2003 Houston Texans staff
Front office: Founder, chairman and chief executive officer – Bob McNair; Senior vice president and general manager – Charley Casserly; Associate director of pro scouting – Bobby Grier; Associate director of pro scouting – Miller McCalmon; Coordinator of college scouting – Mike Maccagnan; Head coaches: Head coach – Dom Capers; Offensive coaches: Offensive coordinator – Chris Palmer; Running backs – Chick Harris; Wide receivers – Kippy Brown; Tight ends – Greg Roman; Offensive line – Tony Marciano; Assistant offensive line – Steve Marshall	Defensive coaches: Defensive coordinator – Vic Fangio; Defensive line – Todd Grantham; Linebackers – Reggie Herring; Defensive backs (secondary) – Jon Hoke; Assistant defensive backs (secondary) – Brian Stewart; Defensive quality control – Jedd Fisch; Special teams coaches: Special teams – Joe Marciano; Special teams assistant – Eric Sutulovich; Strength and conditioning: Strength and conditioning – Dan Riley; Assistant strength and conditioning – Ray Wright

== Roster ==
2003 Houston Texans roster
Quarterbacks (QB): 8 David Carr; 11 Mike Quinn; 4 Dave Ragone; Running backs (RB): 45 Greg Comella FB; 25 Tony Hollings KR; 44 Moran Norris FB; 32 Jonathan Wells; 37 Domanick Davis; Wide receivers (WR): 87 Derick Armstrong; 85 Corey Bradford; 86 Jabar Gaffney PR; 80 Andre Johnson; 84 J. J. Moses KR/PR; Tight ends (TE): 89 Jabari Holloway; 88 Rashod Kent; 82 Billy Miller; 81 Matt Murphy	Offensive linemen (OL): 60 Curry Dawson T; 73 Garrick Jones T; 76 Steve McKinney C; 69 Chester Pitts T; 74 Jamal Powell C; 68 Greg Randall T; 78 Seth Wand T; 77 Todd Washington G; 70 Fred Weary G; 72 Zach Wiegert G; Defensive linemen (DL): 97 Jason Davis DE; 95 Jerry DeLoach DE; 94 Junior Ioane DE; 99 Steve Martin NT; 90 Terrance Martin NT; 92 Corey Sears DE; 79 Jeremy Slechta DE	Linebackers (LB): 59 Travis Carroll OLB; 54 Troy Evans ILB; 58 Steve Foley OLB; 56 Jay Foreman ILB; 98 Antwan Peek OLB; 55 Jamie Sharper ILB; 52 Kailee Wong OLB; Defensive backs (DB): 33 Jason Bell CB/S; 24 Eric Brown SS; 22 Curry Burns FS; 42 Marcus Coleman CB; 38 Demarcus Faggins CB; 20 Rober' Freeman CB; 29 Marlon McCree FS; 30 Jason Simmons CB/S; 21 Darrick Vaughn CB; Special teams (ST): 3 Kris Brown K; 48 Bryan Pittman LS; 7 Chad Stanley P	Practice squad: 93 Kevin DeRonde LB; 83 Albert Johnson WR; 28 Travis Stephens RB; Reserve: 12 Tony Banks QB (IR); 47 Jarrod Baxter FB (IR); 67 Milford Brown G (IR); 50 Charlie Clemons LB (IR); 28 Pat Dennis CB (IR); 31 Aaron Glenn CB (IR); 75 Jimmy Herndon T (IR); -- Bennie Joppru TE (IR); 62 Chris Lorenti C (IR); 64 Ben Lynch C (IR); 34 Stacey Mack RB (IR); 53 Shantee Orr LB (IR); 91 Seth Payne NT (IR); 26 Matt Stevens S (IR); 96 Gary Walker DE (IR); 41 Ramon Walker CB (IR); 43 Kenny Wright CB (IR); Rookies in italics 53 active, 17 reserve, 3 practice squad

== Preseason ==
Week	Date	Opponent	Result	Record	Venue	Recap
1	August 9	Denver Broncos	L 12–20	0–1	Reliant Stadium	Recap
2	August 15	at Dallas Cowboys	L 6–34	0–2	Texas Stadium	Recap
3	August 23	San Diego Chargers	L 17–19	0–3	Reliant Stadium	Recap
4	August 28	at Tampa Bay Buccaneers	L 3–34	0–4	Raymond James Stadium	Recap

== Regular season ==
=== Schedule ===
Week	Date	Opponent	Result	Record	Venue	Recap
1	September 7	at Miami Dolphins	**W** 21–20	1–0	Pro Player Stadium	Recap
2	September 14	at New Orleans Saints	**L** 10–31	1–1	Louisiana Superdome	Recap
3	September 21	Kansas City Chiefs	**L** 14–42	1–2	Reliant Stadium	Recap
4	September 28	**Jacksonville Jaguars**	**W** 24–20	2–2	Reliant Stadium	Recap
5	Bye					
6	October 12	at **Tennessee Titans**	**L** 17–38	2–3	The Coliseum	Recap
7	October 19	New York Jets	**L** 14–19	2–4	Reliant Stadium	Recap
8	October 26	at **Indianapolis Colts**	**L** 21–30	2–5	RCA Dome	Recap
9	November 2	Carolina Panthers	**W** 14–10	3–5	Reliant Stadium	Recap
10	November 9	at Cincinnati Bengals	**L** 27–34	3–6	Paul Brown Stadium	Recap
11	November 16	at Buffalo Bills	**W** 12–10	4–6	Ralph Wilson Stadium	Recap
12	November 23	New England Patriots	**L** 20–23 (OT)	4–7	Reliant Stadium	Recap
13	November 30	Atlanta Falcons	**W** 17–13	5–7	Reliant Stadium	Recap
14	December 7	at **Jacksonville Jaguars**	**L** 0–27	5–8	Alltel Stadium	Recap
15	December 14	at Tampa Bay Buccaneers	**L** 3–16	5–9	Raymond James Stadium	Recap
16	December 21	**Tennessee Titans**	**L** 24–27	5–10	Reliant Stadium	Recap
17	December 28	**Indianapolis Colts**	**L** 17–20	5–11	Reliant Stadium	Recap

Note: Intra-division opponents are in bold text.

=== Game summaries ===
==== Week 1: at Miami Dolphins ====
Week One: Houston Texans at Miami Dolphins – Game summary

Quarter	1	2	3	4	Total
**Texans**	3	3	9	6	**21**
Dolphins	0	14	0	6	**20**

at Pro Player Stadium, Miami, Florida

- Date: September 7
- Game time: 12:00 p.m. CDT / 1:00 p.m. EDT
- Game weather: 89 °F (32 °C), wind 6 mph
- Game attendance: 73,010
- Referee: Terry McAulay
- TV announcers (CBS): Gus Johnson and Brent Jones
- Recap

Game information

**First quarter**

- HOU – Kris Brown 36-yard field goal, 5:14. Texans 3–0. **Drive: 11 plays, 79 yards, 4:13.**

**Second quarter**

- MIA – Chris Chambers 57-yard pass from Jay Fiedler (Olindo Mare kick), 9:34. Dolphins 7–3. **Drive: 2 plays, 57 yards, 0:48.**
- HOU – Kris Brown 50-yard field goal, 6:22. Dolphins 7–6. **Drive: 4 plays, 4 yards, 1:26.**
- MIA – Chris Chambers 21-yard pass from Jay Fiedler (Olindo Mare kick), 1:11. Dolphins 14–6. **Drive: 9 plays, 93 yards, 5:17.**

**Third quarter**

- HOU – Corey Bradford 78-yard pass from David Carr (run failed), 4:34. Dolphins 14–12. **Drive: 1 play, 78 yards, 0:12.**
- HOU – Kris Brown 23-yard field goal, 0:25. Texans 15–14. **Drive: 7 plays, 41 yards, 2:39.**

**Fourth quarter**

- MIA – Ricky Williams 35-yard pass from Jay Fiedler (pass failed), 12:37. Dolphins 20–15. **Drive: 8 plays, 80 yards, 2:57.**
- HOU – Kris Brown 24-yard field goal, 4:59. Dolphins 20–18. **Drive: 16 plays, 72 yards, 7:29.**
- HOU – Kris Brown 35-yard field goal, 0:30. Texans 21–20. **Drive: 7 plays, 24 yards, 3:28.**

**Top passers**

- HOU – David Carr – 17/31, 266 yards, TD
- MIA – Jay Fiedler – 17/32, 227 yards, 3 TD, 2 INT

**Top rushers**

- HOU – Stacey Mack – 27 rushes, 89 yards
- MIA – Ricky Williams – 17 rushes, 69 yards

**Top receivers**

- HOU – Corey Bradford – 2 receptions, 85 yards, TD
- MIA – Chris Chambers – 7 receptions, 118 yards, 2 TD

==== Week 2: at New Orleans Saints ====
Week Two: Houston Texans at New Orleans Saints – Game summary

Quarter	1	2	3	4	Total
Texans	0	10	0	0	**10**
**Saints**	7	0	10	14	**31**

at Louisiana Superdome, New Orleans, Louisiana

- Date: September 14
- Game time: 12:00 p.m. CDT
- Game weather: None (indoor stadium)
- Game attendance: 68,390
- Referee: Peter Morelli
- TV announcers (CBS): Craig Bolerjack, Beasley Reece
- Recap

Game information

**First quarter**

- NO – Deuce McAllister 24-yard run (John Carney kick), 1:35. Saints 7–0. **Drive: 7 plays, 52 yards, 2:31.**

**Second quarter**

- HOU – David Carr 1-yard run (Kris Brown kick), 10:46. Tied 7–7. **Drive: 9 plays, 61 yards, 2:31.**
- HOU – Kris Brown 30-yard field goal, 0:06. Texans 10–7. **Drive: 9 plays, 57 yards, 2:07.**

**Third quarter**

- NO – Donté Stallworth 35-yard pass from Aaron Brooks (John Carney kick), 10:57. Saints 14–10. **Drive: 9 plays, 64 yards, 3:58.**
- NO – John Carney 39-yard field goal, 1:25. Saints 17–10. **Drive: 9 plays, 57 yards, 3:53.**

**Fourth quarter**

- NO – Ernie Conwell 2-yard pass from Aaron Brooks (John Carney kick), 9:05. Saints 24–10. **Drive: 8 plays, 72 yards, 4:14.**
- NO – Joffrey Reynolds 40-yard interception return, 3:00. Saints 31–10.

**Top passers**

- HOU – David Carr – 17/36, 213 yards, 2 INT
- NO – Aaron Brooks – 18/27, 189 yards, 2 TD

**Top rushers**

- HOU – Stacey Mack – 13 rushes, 31 yards
- NO – Deuce McAllister – 20 rushes, 96 yards, TD

**Top receivers**

- HOU – Andre Johnson – 5 receptions, 71 yards
- NO – Joe Horn – 10 receptions, 111 yards

==== Week 3: vs. Kansas City Chiefs ====
Week Three: Kansas City Chiefs at Houston Texans – Game summary

Quarter	1	2	3	4	Total
**Chiefs**	7	7	14	14	**42**
Texans	0	7	0	7	**14**

at Reliant Stadium, Houston, Texas

- Date: September 21
- Game time: 12:00 p.m. CDT
- Game weather: None (retractable roof closed)
- Game attendance: 70,487
- Referee: Ron Blum
- TV announcers (CBS): Kevin Harlan, Randy Cross, Marcus Allen
- Recap

Game information

**First quarter**

- KC – Priest Holmes 6-yard run (Morten Andersen kick), 9:09. Chiefs 7–0. **Drive: 6 plays, 84 yards, 2:16.**

**Second quarter**

- HOU – Andre Johnson 43-yard pass from Derek Carr (Kris Brown kick), 5:55. Tied 7–7. **Drive: 9 plays, 97 yards, 5:08.**
- KC – Priest Holmes 3-yard run (Morten Andersen kick), 0:19. Chiefs 14–7. **Drive: 2 plays, 97 yards, 0:05.**

**Third quarter**

- KC – Eddie Kennison 15-yard pass from Trent Green (Morten Andersen kick), 4:18. Chiefs 21–7. **Drive: 3 plays, 32 yards, 0:20.**
- KC – Dante Hall 73-yard punt return (Morten Andersen kick), 1:50. Chiefs 28–7.

**Fourth quarter**

- KC – Derrick Blaylock 20-yard run (Morten Andersen kick), 14:04. Chiefs 35–7. **Drive: 3 plays, 85 yards, 0:43.**
- KC – Shaunard Harts 38-yard interception return (Morten Andersen kick), 7:16. Chiefs 42–7.
- HOU – Andre Johnson 4-yard pass from Tony Banks (Kris Brown kick), 2:01. Chiefs 42–14. **Drive: 16 plays, 68 yards, 5:06.**

**Top passers**

- KC – Trent Green – 16/28, 262 yards, TD, 2 INT
- HOU – David Carr – 17/27, 167 yards, TD, 2 INT

**Top rushers**

- KC – Priest Holmes – 18 rushes, 89 yards, 2 TD
- HOU – Tony Hollings – 7 rushes, 41 yards

**Top receivers**

- KC – Priest Holmes – 4 receptions, 67 yards
- HOU – Andre Johnson – 7 receptions, 102 yards, 2 TD

==== Week 4: vs. Jacksonville Jaguars ====
Week Four: Jacksonville Jaguars at Houston Texans – Game summary

Quarter	1	2	3	4	Total
Jaguars	3	7	10	0	**20**
**Texans**	7	7	3	7	**24**

at Reliant Stadium, Houston, Texas

- Date: September 28
- Game time: 12:00 p.m. CDT
- Game attendance: 70,041
- Referee: Tony Corrente
- TV announcers (CBS): Don Criqui, Steve Tasker
- Recap

Game information

**First quarter**

- HOU – Stacey Mack 5-yard run (Kris Brown kick), 9:00. Texans 7–0. **Drive: 11 plays, 69 yards, 5:35.**
- JAX – Seth Marler 29-yard field goal, 3:19. Texans 7–3. **Drive: 11 plays, 51 yards, 4:13.**

**Second quarter**

- HOU – Jabar Gaffney 24-yard pass from David Carr (Kris Brown kick), 14:11. Texans 14–3. **Drive: 8 plays, 53 yards, 3:59.**
- JAX – Fred Taylor 1-yard run (Seth Marler kick), 6:46. Texans 14–10. **Drive: 7 plays, 48 yards, 3:25.**

**Third quarter**

- HOU – Kris Brown 48-yard field goal, 13:45. Texans 17–10. **Drive: 4 plays, -1 yards, 0:55.**
- JAX – Troy Edwards 84-yard pass from Byron Leftwich (Seth Marler kick), 11:04. Tied 17–17. **Drive: 2 plays, 84 yards, 0:17.**
- JAX – Seth Marler 20-yard field goal, 4:06. Jaguars 20–17. **Drive: 9 plays, 66 yards, 3:36.**

**Fourth quarter**

- HOU – David Carr 1-yard run (Kris Brown kick), 0:02. Texans 24–20. **Drive: 10 plays, 41 yards, 3:20.**

**Top passers**

- JAX – Byron Leftwich – 17/36, 231 yards, TD, 3 INT
- HOU – David Carr – 23/36, 234 yards, TD, INT

**Top rushers**

- JAX – Fred Taylor – 19 rushes, 67 yards, TD
- HOU – Domanick Davis – 16 rushes, 53 yards

**Top receivers**

- JAX – Troy Edwards – 3 receptions, 111 yards, TD
- HOU – Andre Johnson – 8 receptions 97 yards

==== Week 6: at Tennessee Titans ====
Week Six: Houston Texans at Tennessee Titans – Game summary

Quarter	1	2	3	4	Total
Texans	0	3	7	7	**17**
**Titans**	14	7	3	14	**38**

at The Coliseum, Nashville, Tennessee

- Date: October 12
- Game time: 12:00 p.m. CDT
- Game weather: 69 °F (21 °C), wind 3 mph
- Game attendance: 68,809
- Referee: Gerald Austin
- TV announcers (CBS): Don Criqui, Steve Tasker
- Recap

Game information

**First quarter**

- TEN – Derrick Mason 32-yard pass from Steve McNair (Gary Anderson kick), 10:38. Titans 7–0. **Drive: 6 plays, 74 yards, 2:53.**
- TEN – Derrick Mason 46-yard pass from Steve McNair (Gary Anderson kick), 6:12. Titans 14–0. **Drive: 5 plays, 69 yards, 2:45.**

**Second quarter**

- TEN – Robert Holcombe 5-yard run (Gary Anderson kick), 0:57. Titans 21–0. **Drive: 9 plays, 88 yards, 4:32.**
- HOU – Kris Brown 29-yard field goal, 0:00. Titans 21–3. **Drive: 7 plays, 58 yards, 0:57.**

**Third quarter**

- HOU – Corey Bradford 65-yard pass from David Carr (Kris Brown kick), 12:20. Titans 21–10. **Drive: 2 plays, 98 yards, 0:56.**
- TEN – Gary Anderson 33-yard field goal, 3:44. Titans 24–10. **Drive: 8 plays, 38 yards, 3:09.**

**Fourth quarter**

- TEN – Derrick Mason 50-yard pass from Steve McNair (Gary Anderson kick), 14:46. Titans 31–10. **Drive: 5 plays, 98 yards, 1:46.**
- TEN – Andre Dyson 51-yard interception return (Gary Anderson kick), 13:03. Titans 38–10.
- HOU – Derick Armstrong 13-yard pass from David Carr (Kris Brown kick), 9:06. Titans 38–17. **Drive: 10 plays, 80 yards, 3:57.**

**Top passers**

- HOU – David Carr – 25/42, 371 yards, 2 TD, 3 INT
- TEN – Steve McNair – 18/27, 421 yards, 3 TD

**Top rushers**

- HOU – Domanick Davis – 7 rushes, 59 yards
- TEN – Eddie George – 19 rushes, 60 yards

**Top receivers**

- HOU – Corey Bradford – 5 receptions, 127 yards, TD
- TEN – Derrick Mason – 6 receptions, 177 yards, 2 TD

David Carr threw for 371 yards and two touchdowns, but also threw three interceptions, including a pick six.

==== Week 7: vs. New York Jets ====
Week Seven: New York Jets at Houston Texans – Game summary

Quarter	1	2	3	4	Total
**Jets**	0	7	3	9	**19**
Texans	7	7	0	0	**14**

at Reliant Stadium, Houston, Texas

- Date: October 19
- Game time: 3:05 p.m. CDT
- Game attendance: 70,623
- Referee: Ed Hochuli
- TV announcers (CBS): Kevin Harlan, Randy Cross
- Recap

Game information

**First quarter**

- HOU – Stacey Mack 10-yard run (Kris Brown kick), 8:53. Texans 7–0. **Drive: 8 plays, 61 yards, 4:31.**

**Second quarter**

- HOU – Stacey Mack 1-yard run (Kris Brown kick), 14:56. Texans 14–0. **Drive: 8 plays, 64 yards, 4:09.**
- NYJ – Santana Moss 18-yard pass from Vinny Testaverde (Doug Brien kick), 1:22. Texans 14–7. **Drive: 7 plays, 91 yards, 2:16.**

**Third quarter**

- NYJ – Doug Brien 39-yard field goal, 1:36. Texans 14–10. **Drive: 9 plays, 59 yards, 3:13.**

**Fourth quarter**

- NYJ – Doug Brien 30-yard field goal, 9:05. Texans 14–13. **Drive: 9 plays, 26 yards, 4:40.**
- NYJ – LaMont Jordan 8-yard run (pass failed), 1:21. Jets 19–14. **Drive: 8 plays, 86 yards, 1:27.**

**Top passers**

- NYJ – Vinny Testaverde – 15/29, 182 yards, TD
- HOU – David Carr – 15/23, 170 yards

**Top rushers**

- NYJ – Curtis Martin – 17 rushes, 88 yards
- HOU – Domanick Davis – 27 rushes, 129 yards

**Top receivers**

- NYJ – Santana Moss – 6 receptions, 111 yards, TD
- HOU – Andre Johnson – 3 receptions, 71 yards

==== Week 8: at Indianapolis Colts ====
Week Eight: Houston Texans at Indianapolis Colts – Game summary

Quarter	1	2	3	4	Total
Texans	0	14	0	7	**21**
**Colts**	3	14	10	3	**30**

at RCA Dome, Indianapolis, Indiana

- Date: October 26
- Game time: 3:15 p.m. CST / 4:15 p.m. CST
- Game weather: None (indoor stadium)
- Game attendance: 56,132
- Referee: Walt Coleman
- TV announcers (CBS): Gus Johnson and Brent Jones
- Recap

Game information

**First quarter**

- IND – Mike Vanderjagt 31-yard field goal, 0:44. Colts 3–0. **Drive: 10 plays, 71 yards, 6:28.**

**Second quarter**

- HOU – Domanick Davis 15-yard run (Kris Brown kick), 11:14. Texans 7–3. **Drive: 2 plays, 28 yards, 0:37.**
- HOU – Billy Miller 1-yard pass from David Carr (Kris Brown kick), 4:55. Texans 14–3. **Drive: 8 plays, 79 yards, 4:39.**
- IND – Marcus Pollard 1-yard pass from Peyton Manning (Mike Vanderjagt kick), 1:54. Texans 14–10. **Drive: 7 plays, 69 yards, 3:01.**
- IND – Reggie Wayne 2-yard pass from Peyton Manning (Mike Vanderjagt kick), 0:15. Colts 17–14 **Drive: 4 plays, 23 yards, 0:42.**

**Third quarter**

- IND – Reggie Wayne 57-yard pass from Peyton Manning (Mike Vanderjagt kick), 14:03. Colts 24–14. **Drive: 2 plays, 68 yards, 0:57.**
- IND – Mike Vanderjagt 29-yard field goal, 4:34. Colts 27–14. **Drive: 12 plays, 81 yards, 5:41.**

**Fourth quarter**

- HOU – Domanick Davis 2-yard run (Kris Brown kick), 12:31. Colts 27–21. **Drive: 12 plays, 66 yards, 7:03.**
- IND – Mike Vanderjagt 22-yard field goal, 5:16. Colts 30–21. **Drive: 13 plays, 67 yards, 7:15.**

**Top passers**

- HOU – Tony Banks – 12/17, 88 yards, INT
- IND – Peyton Manning – 22/30, 269 yards, 3 TD

**Top rushers**

- HOU – Domanick Davis – 25 rushes, 109 yards, 2 TD
- IND – Edgerrin James – 23 rushes, 104 yards

**Top receivers**

- HOU – Jabar Gaffney – 4 receptions, 58 yards
- IND – Marvin Harrison – 8 receptions, 100 yards

This was the closest the Texans ever got to beating the Colts in the RCA Dome.

==== Week 9: vs. Carolina Panthers ====
Week Nine: Carolina Panthers at Houston Texans – Game summary

Quarter	1	2	3	4	Total
Panthers	7	0	3	0	**10**
**Texans**	0	0	7	7	**14**

at Reliant Stadium, Houston, Texas

- Date: November 2
- Game time: 12:00 p.m. CST
- Game weather: None (retractable roof)
- Game attendance: 70,052
- Referee: Ron Blum
- TV announcers (Fox): Ron Pitts, Tim Ryan
- Recap

Game information

**First quarter**

- CAR – Steve Smith Sr. 24-yard pass from Jake Delhomme (John Kasay kick), 7:47. Panthers 7–0. **Drive: 12 plays, 68 yards, 7:13.**

**Second quarter**

- No scoring plays

**Third quarter**

- HOU – Stacey Mack 1-yard run (Kris Brown kick), 6:43. Tied 7–7. **Drive: 13 plays, 73 yards, 8:17.**
- CAR – John Kasay 23-yard field goal, 0:05. Panthers 10–7. **Drive: 14 plays, 68 yards, 6:38.**

**Fourth quarter**

- HOU – Billy Miller 20-yard pass from Tony Banks (Kris Brown kick), 9:30. Texans 14–10. **Drive: 9 plays, 67 yards, 5:35.**

**Top passers**

- CAR – Jake Delhomme – 13/23, 193 yards, TD, INT
- HOU – Tony Banks – 13/19, 154 yards, TD

**Top rushers**

- CAR – Stephen Davis – 30 rushes, 153 yards
- HOU – Domanick Davis – 12 rushes, 74 yards

**Top receivers**

- CAR – Steve Smith Sr. – 5 receptions, 88 yards, TD
- HOU – Andre Johnson – 4 receptions, 64 yards

==== Week 10: at Cincinnati Bengals ====
Week Ten: Houston Texans at Cincinnati Bengals – Game summary

Quarter	1	2	3	4	Total
Texans	3	14	10	0	**27**
**Bengals**	7	10	7	10	**34**

at Paul Brown Stadium, Cincinnati, Ohio

- Date: November 9
- Game time: 12:00 p.m. CST / 1:00 p.m. CST
- Game weather: 43 °F (6 °C), wind 7 mph
- Game attendance: 50,437
- Referee: Terry McAulay
- TV announcers (CBS): Don Criqui, Steve Tasker
- Recap

Game information

**First quarter**

- CIN – Brandon Bennett 6-yard pass from Jon Kitna (Shayne Graham kick), 9:03. Bengals 7–0. **Drive: 13 plays, 77 yards, 5:41.**
- HOU – Kris Brown 45-yard field goal, 6:56. Bengals 7–3. **Drive: 5 plays, 17 yards, 1:54.**

**Second quarter**

- HOU – Corey Bradford 73-yard pass from David Carr (Kris Brown kick), 14:49. Texans 10–7. **Drive: 3 plays, 74 yards, 1:16.**
- CIN – Jeremi Johnson 1-yard run (Shayne Graham kick), 6:47. Bengals 14–10. **Drive: 14 plays, 74 yards, 8:02.**
- CIN – Shayne Graham 40-yard field goal, 2:33. Bengals 17–10. **Drive: 5 plays, 27 yards, 2:41.**
- HOU – Jabar Gaffney 8-yard pass from David Carr (Kris Brown kick), 0:19. Tied 17–17. **Drive: 6 plays, 44 yards, 0:53.**

**Third quarter**

- HOU – Domanick Davis 2-yard run (Kris Brown kick), 12:31. Texans 24–17. **Drive: 6 plays, 83 yards, 2:29.**
- CIN – Rudi Johnson 17-yard run (Shayne Graham kick), 8:09. Tied 24–24. **Drive: 9 plays, 73 yards, 4:22.**
- HOU – Kris Brown 33-yard field goal, 1:47. Texans 27–24. **Drive: 14 plays, 33 yards, 6:22.**

**Fourth quarter**

- CIN – Rudi Johnson 1-yard run (Shayne Graham kick), 10:56. Bengals 31–27. **Drive: 12 plays, 65 yards, 5:51.**
- CIN – Shayne Graham 40-yard field goal, 2:23. Bengals 34–27. **Drive: 15 plays, 56 yards, 7:07.**

**Top passers**

- HOU – David Carr – 11/25, 146 yards, 2 TD, INT
- CIN – Jon Kitna – 18/26, 182 yards, TD, INT

**Top rushers**

- HOU – Domanick Davis – 14 rushes, 104 yards, TD
- CIN – Rudi Johnson – 43 rushes, 182 yards, 2 TD

**Top receivers**

- HOU – Corey Bradford – 1 reception, 73 yards, TD
- CIN – Chad Johnson – 9 receptions, 89 yards

==== Week 11: at Buffalo Bills ====
Week Eleven: Houston Texans at Buffalo Bills – Game summary

Quarter	1	2	3	4	Total
**Texans**	0	6	3	3	**12**
Bills	2	3	3	2	**10**

at Ralph Wilson Stadium, Orchard Park, New York

- Date: November 16
- Game time: 12:00 p.m. CST / 1:00 p.m. EST
- Game weather: 47 °F (8 °C), wind 3 mph
- Game attendance: 72,677
- Referee: Johnny Grier
- TV announcers (CBS): Don Criqui, Steve Tasker
- Recap

Game information

**First quarter**

- BUF – David Carr fumble out of end zone, 4:48. Bills 2–0.

**Second quarter**

- BUF – Rian Lindell 23-yard field goal, 2:07. Bills 5–0. **Drive: 9 plays, 89 yards, 4:23.**
- HOU – Andre Johnson 46-yard pass from Tony Banks (run failed), 1:12. Texans 6–5. **Drive: 4 plays, 73 yards, 0:55.**

**Third quarter**

- HOU – Kris Brown 41-yard field goal, 10:42. Texans 9–5. **Drive: 10 plays, 52 yards, 4:18.**
- BUF – Rian Lindell 20-yard field goal, 4:38. Texans 9–8. **Drive: 7 plays, 18 yards, 4:00.**

**Fourth quarter**

- HOU – Kris Brown 34-yard field goal, 3:23. Texans 12–8. **Drive: 9 plays, 67 yards, 5:22.**
- BUF – Andre Johnson tackled in own end zone, 0:00. Texans 12–10.

**Top passers**

- HOU – Tony Banks – 11/16, 207 yards, TD, INT
- BUF – Drew Bledsoe – 15/26, 184 yards

**Top rushers**

- HOU – Domanick Davis – 26 rushes, 68 yards
- BUF – Travis Henry – 23 rushes, 149 yards

**Top receivers**

- HOU – Andre Johnson – 4 receptions, 122 yards, TD
- BUF – Bobby Shaw – 5 receptions, 92 yards

On the Texans' third offensive drive, David Carr was sacked in his own end zone by Jeff Posey and fumbled the ball. The ball eventually went out of bounds in the end zone, resulting in a safety, giving the Bills a 2–0 lead. Carr was injured on the play and would be replaced by Tony Banks for the rest of the game. On the final play of the game, the Texans were facing a 4th and 14 at their own 34-yard line with 0:03 left to play up 12–8. The team lined up in a punt formation and Andre Johnson took the ball, intentionally running backwards to his own end zone and ran out of bounds for a safety with 0:00 on the clock, securing a 12–10 victory for the Texans.

==== Week 12: vs. New England Patriots ====
Week Twelve: New England Patriots at Houston Texans – Game summary

Quarter	1	2	3	4	OT	Total
**Patriots**	0	10	0	10	3	**23**
Texans	3	0	7	10	0	**20**

at Reliant Stadium, Houston, Texas

- Date: November 23
- Game time: 12:00 p.m. CST
- Game weather: None (retractable roof closed)
- Game attendance: 70,719
- Referee: Mike Carey
- TV announcers (CBS): Kevin Harlan, Randy Cross, Marcus Allen
- Recap

Game information

**First quarter**

- HOU – Kris Brown 19-yard field goal, 2:36. Texans 3–0. **Drive: 14 plays, 79 yards, 8:41.**

**Second quarter**

- NE – Bethel Johnson 27-yard pass from Tom Brady (Adam Vinatieri kick), 13:12. Patriots 7–3. **Drive: 10 plays, 67 yards, 4:24.**
- NE – Adam Vinatieri 21-yard field goal, 5:55. Patriots 10–3. **Drive: 4 plays, 4 yards, 2:02.**

**Third quarter**

- HOU – Andre Johnson 10-yard pass from Tony Banks (Kris Brown kick), 4:01. Tied 10–10. **Drive: 2 plays, 11 yards, 0:32.**

**Fourth quarter**

- NE – Adam Vinatieri 32-yard field goal, 14:57. Patriots 13–10. **Drive: 9 plays, 56 yards, 4:04.**
- HOU – Billy Miller 16-yard pass from Tony Banks (Kris Brown kick), 6:49. Texans 17–13. **Drive: 5 plays, 31 yards, 2:10.**
- HOU – Kris Brown 31-yard field goal, 3:11. Texans 20–13. **Drive: 4 plays, 8 yards, 1:39.**
- NE – Daniel Graham 4-yard pass from Tom Brady (Adam Vinatieri kick), 0:40. Tied 20–20. **Drive: 9 plays, 80 yards, 2:31.**

**Overtime**

- NE – Adam Vinatieri 28-yard field goal, 0:41. Patriots 23–20. **Drive: 9 plays, 76 yards, 3:39.**

**Top passers**

- NE – Tom Brady – 29/47, 368 yards, 2 TD, 2 INT
- HOU – Tony Banks – 10/25, 93 yards, 2 TD, INT

**Top rushers**

- NE – Kevin Faulk – 23 rushes, 80 yards
- HOU – Domanick Davis – 24 rushes, 69 yards

**Top receivers**

- NE – Kevin Faulk – 8 receptions, 108 yards
- HOU – Andre Johnson – 4 receptions, 37 yards, TD

==== Week 13: vs. Atlanta Falcons ====
Week Thirteen: Atlanta Falcons at Houston Texans – Game summary

Quarter	1	2	3	4	Total
Falcons	0	7	0	6	**13**
**Texans**	0	3	14	0	**17**

at Reliant Stadium, Houston, Texas

- Date: November 30
- Game time: 12:00 p.m. CST
- Game weather: None (retractable roof closed)
- Game attendance: 70,388
- Referee: Larry Nemmers
- TV announcers (Fox): Ron Pitts, Tim Ryan
- Recap

Game information

**First quarter**

- No scoring plays

**Second quarter**

- ATL – T. J. Duckett 1-yard run (Jay Feely kick), 8:38. Falcons 7–0. **Drive: 8 plays, 68 yards, 4:21.**
- HOU – Kris Brown 40-yard field goal, 5:43. Falcons 7–3. **Drive: 6 plays, 40 yards, 2:55.**

**Third quarter**

- HOU – Domanick Davis 7-yard run (Kris Brown kick), 8:51. Texans 10–7. **Drive: 8 plays, 63 yards, 4:21.**
- HOU – Domanick Davis 2-yard run (Kris Brown kick), 6:31. Texans 17–7. **Drive: 8 plays, 63 yards, 4:21.**

**Fourth quarter**

- ATL – Jay Feely 35-yard field goal, 14:07. Texans 17–10. **Drive: 6 plays, 16 yards, 3:07.**
- ATL – Jay Feely 42-yard field goal, 1:24. Texans 17–13. **Drive: 14 plays, 56 yards, 5:45.**

**Top passers**

- ATL – Doug Johnson – 12/27, 116 yards, INT
- HOU – Tony Banks – 8/14, 100 yards

**Top rushers**

- ATL – T. J. Duckett – 12 rushes, 31 yards, TD
- HOU – Domanick Davis – 24 rushes, 101 yards, 2 TD

**Top receivers**

- ATL – Alge Crumpler – 4 receptions, 48 yards
- HOU – Billy Miller – 4 receptions, 40 yards

==== Week 14: at Jacksonville Jaguars ====
Week Fourteen: Houston Texans at Jacksonville Jaguars – Game summary

Quarter	1	2	3	4	Total
Texans	0	0	0	0	**0**
**Jaguars**	7	10	0	10	**27**

at Alltel Stadium, Jacksonville, Florida

- Date: December 7
- Game time: 12:00 p.m. CST / 1:00 p.m. EST
- Game weather: 56 °F (13 °C), wind 7 mph
- Game attendance: 43,363
- Referee: Jeff Triplette
- TV announcers (CBS): Craig Bolerjack, Beasley Reece
- Recap

Game information

**First quarter**

- JAX – Jimmy Smith 32-yard pass from Byron Leftwich (Seth Marler kick), 5:24. Jaguars 7–0. **Drive: 6 plays, 63 yards, 3:03.**

**Second quarter**

- JAX – Seth Marler 35-yard field goal, 3:24. Jaguars 10–0. **Drive: 11 plays, 36 yards, 4:34.**
- JAX – Fred Taylor 2-yard run (Seth Marler kick), 0:15. Jaguars 17–0. **Drive: 9 plays, 84 yards, 1:34.**

**Third quarter**

- No scoring plays

**Fourth quarter**

- JAX – LaBrandon Toefield 1-yard run (Seth Marler kick), 10:21. Jaguars 24–0. **Drive: 5 plays, 80 yards, 2:43.**
- JAX – Seth Marler 28-yard field goal, 1:55. Jaguars 27–0. **Drive: 13 plays, 72 yards, 7:10.**

**Top passers**

- HOU – Dave Ragone – 11/23, 71 yards, INT
- JAX – Byron Leftwich – 18/29, 194 yards, TD

**Top rushers**

- HOU – Tony Hollings – 18 rushes, 19 yards
- JAX – Fred Taylor – 24 rushes, 163 yards, TD

**Top receivers**

- HOU – Billy Miller – 4 receptions, 29 yards
- JAX – Jimmy Smith – 3 receptions, 58 yards, TD

With injuries to both David Carr and Tony Banks, third-round rookie quarterback Dave Ragone made his first NFL start. Decimated by injuries, the Texans' offense struggled throughout the game, finishing with just 124 yards and three turnovers.

==== Week 15: at Tampa Bay Buccaneers ====
Week Fifteen: Houston Texans at Tampa Bay Buccaneers – Game summary

Quarter	1	2	3	4	Total
Texans	0	0	3	0	**3**
**Buccaneers**	7	6	3	0	**16**

at Raymond James Stadium, Tampa Bay, Florida

- Date: December 14
- Game time: 12:00 p.m. CST / 1:00 p.m.
- Game weather: 67 °F (19 °C), rain, wind 7 mph
- Game attendance: 65,124
- Referee: Gerald Austin
- TV announcers (CBS): Don Criqui, Steve Tasker
- Recap

Game information

**First quarter**

- TB – Thomas Jones 18-yard run (Martin Gramatica kick), 7:26. Buccaneers 7–0. **Drive: 8 plays, 53 yards, 4:08.**

**Second quarter**

- TB – Martin Gramatica 36-yard field goal, 10:13. Buccaneers 10–0. **Drive: 8 plays, 49 yards, 4:47.**
- TB – Martin Gramatica 23-yard field goal, 0:33. Buccaneers 13–0. **Drive: 14 plays, 72 yards, 7:00.**

**Third quarter**

- HOU – Kris Brown 38-yard field goal, 9:01. Buccaneers 13–3. **Drive: 8 plays, 51 yards, 3:33.**
- TB – Martin Gramatica 26-yard field goal, 7:03. Buccaneers 16–3. **Drive: 6 plays, 72 yards, 1:58.**

**Fourth quarter**

- No scoring plays

**Top passers**

- HOU – Dave Ragone – 9/17, 64 yards
- TB – Brad Johnson – 17/28, 237 yards

**Top rushers**

- HOU – Domanick Davis – 16 rushes, 56 yards
- TB – Thomas Jones – 34 rushes, 134 yards, TD

**Top receivers**

- HOU – Andre Johnson – 4 receptions, 28 yards
- TB – Charles Lee – 3 receptions, 95 yards

==== Week 16: vs. Tennessee Titans ====
Week Sixteen: Tennessee Titans at Houston Texans – Game summary

Quarter	1	2	3	4	Total
**Titans**	0	10	7	10	**27**
Texans	0	3	14	7	**24**

at Reliant Stadium, Houston, Texas

- Date: December 21
- Game time: 12:00 p.m. CST
- Game attendance: 70,758
- Referee: Peter Morelli
- TV announcers (CBS): Gus Johnson, Brent Jones
- Recap

==== Week 17: Indianapolis Colts ====
Week Seventeen: Indianapolis Colts at Houston Texans – Game summary

Quarter	1	2	3	4	Total
**Colts**	0	3	0	17	**20**
Texans	0	10	7	0	**17**

at Reliant Stadium, Houston, Texas

- Date: December 28
- Game time: 12:00 p.m. CST
- Game weather: None (retractable roof closed)
- Game attendance: 70,680
- Referee: Ed Hochuli
- TV announcers (CBS): Ian Eagle, Solomon Wilcots, Marcus Allen
- Recap

=== Standings ===
AFC South
	W	L	T	PCT	DIV	CONF	PF	PA	STK
^{(3)} Indianapolis Colts	12	4	0	.750	5–1	9–3	447	336	W1
^{(5)} Tennessee Titans	12	4	0	.750	4–2	8–4	435	324	W3
Jacksonville Jaguars	5	11	0	.313	2–4	3–9	276	331	L1
Houston Texans	5	11	0	.313	1–5	3–9	255	380	L4

== Statistics ==
=== Team ===
Category	Total yards	Yards per game	NFL rank (out of 32)
Passing offense	2,655	165.9	29th
Rushing offense	1,651	103.2	23rd
Total offense	4,306	269.1	31st
Passing defense	3,712	232.0	31st
Rushing defense	2,370	148.1	31st
Total defense	6,082	380.1	31st

=== Individual ===
Category	Player	Total
Offense
Passing yards	David Carr	2,013
Passing touchdowns	David Carr	9
Rushing yards	Domanick Williams	1,031
Rushing touchdowns	Domanick Williams	8
Receiving yards	Andre Johnson	976
Receiving touchdowns	Andre Johnson	4
Defense
Tackles (Solo)	Jamie Sharper	105
Sacks	Jamie Sharper	4
Interceptions	Marcus Coleman	7
