= Travis Carroll =

American football player (born 1978)

No. 55
- Position: Linebacker

Personal information
- Born: October 26, 1978 (age 48); Jacksonville, Florida, U.S.

Career information
- High school: Bolles
- University: Alabama (1997–1998); Florida (1999–2001)
- NFL draft: 2002: undrafted

Career history
- New Orleans Saints (2002–2003); Houston Texans (2003)
- Stats at Pro Football Reference

Travis Carroll (born October 26, 1978) is an American former professional football player who played as a linebacker in college for Alabama and Florida, and in the National Football League (NFL) for the New Orleans Saints and Houston Texans.

== Early life ==
Carroll was born in Jacksonville, Florida and attended The Bolles School.

== College career ==
=== 1997 season ===
As a true freshman, Carroll started five of the final six games of the season at middle linebacker for Alabama. Being credited with 46 tackles and 9 sacks.

=== 1998 season ===
A starter at middle linebacker for Alabama in eight games as a true sophomore, ending the season with 76 total tackles being ranked second best on the Crimson Tide defense. Credited with 16 tackles for loss. He Registered a career-high 14 tackles in a 16–10 Alabama loss to Florida in Tuscaloosa

=== 1999 season ===
In 1999, he would transfer from Alabama to Florida. Where he would sit out the entire season.

=== 2000 season ===
Carroll would play his first game for Florida against Kentucky. He would record one solo tackle before suffering a knee injury after only five plays. He would start in the final four games of the season, including the SEC Championship Game against Auburn where he would record eight total tackles (three solo), two forced fumbles and a pass deflection to help lead Florida to a 28–6 victory.

=== 2001 season ===
During his redshirt senior season, he played in all 11 games with two starts after recovering from off-season shoulder surgery. He recorded 51 tackles on the year, including seven in the Orange Bowl. He also tied for the team lead in interceptions, returning one for a 24-yard touchdown against South Carolina.

== Professional career ==
=== 2002 season ===
On April 26, 2002 Carroll would sign with the New Orleans Saints. He would play his first NFL game against the Tampa Bay Buccaneers, where he end the game two tackles. He would get his first solo tackle the following week against the Green Bay Packers, ending the season with 10 total tackles.

=== 2003 season ===
He would play his final game for the Saints against the Seattle Seahawks. On September 8, 2003, he was released from the Saints. On December 1st, 2003 Carroll would sign with the Houston Texans . Carroll would play four games for the Texans in the 2003 season. On March 22, 2004, Carroll would resign with the Texans, five months later on August 4, the Texans waived Carroll to make room for Deitan Dubuc.

== NFL career statistics ==
Year	Team	Games		Tackling		
Year	Team	GP	GS	Cmb	Solo	Ast
2002	NO	6	0	10	7	3
2003	NO	1	0	1	0	1
2003	HOU	4	0	1	1	0
Career		14	0	12	8	4
