= Andre Johnson =

American football player (born 1981)

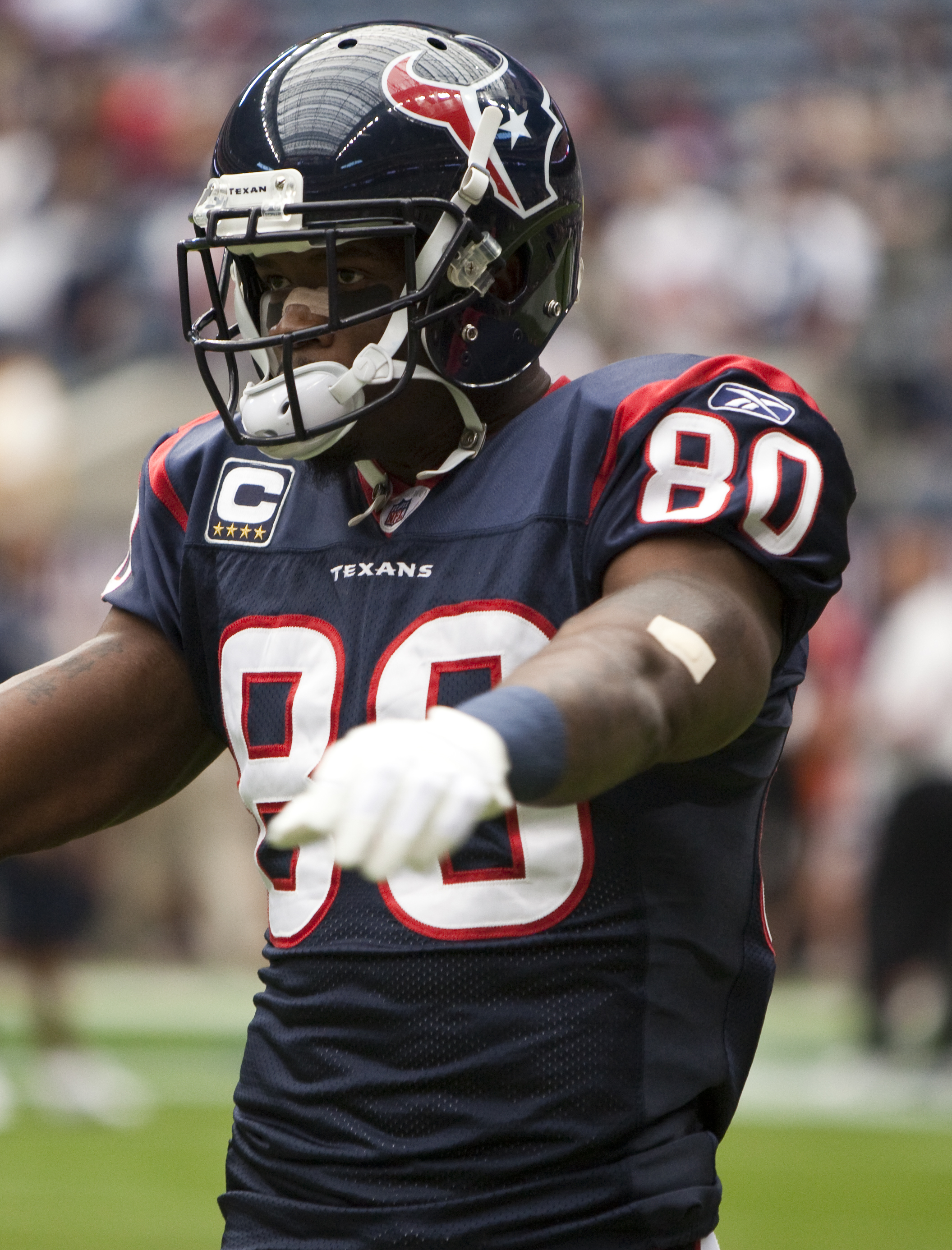
- Johnson with the Houston Texans in 2010

No. 80, 81
- Position: Wide receiver

Personal information
- Born: July 11, 1981 (age 45); Miami, Florida, U.S.
- Listed height: 6 ft 3 in (1.91 m)
- Listed weight: 229 lb (104 kg)

Career information
- High school: Miami Senior
- College: Miami (FL) (2000–2002)
- NFL draft: 2003: 1st round, 3rd overall pick

Career history

Playing
- Houston Texans (2003–2014); Indianapolis Colts (2015); Tennessee Titans (2016)

Coaching
- Houston Texans (2019) Special advisor

Awards and highlights
- 2× First-team All-Pro (2008, 2009); 2× Second-team All-Pro (2006, 2012); 7× Pro Bowl (2004, 2006, 2008–2010, 2012, 2013); 2× NFL receptions leader (2006, 2008); 2× NFL receiving yards leader (2008, 2009); PFWA All-Rookie Team (2003); Houston Texans Ring of Honor; BCS national champion (2001); Third-team All-American (2002)

Career NFL statistics
- Receptions: 1,062
- Receiving yards: 14,185
- Receiving touchdowns: 70
- Stats at Pro Football Reference
- Pro Football Hall of Fame

Andre Lamont Johnson (born July 11, 1981) is an American former professional football player who was a wide receiver for 14 seasons in the National Football League (NFL), primarily with the Houston Texans. He played college football for the Miami Hurricanes, and was selected by the Texans third overall in the 2003 NFL draft. He is 11th all-time in NFL career receptions, and in NFL receiving yards. Playing his first 12 years with Houston, Johnson holds nearly every Texans receiving record. He was also a member of the Indianapolis Colts and Tennessee Titans, playing one season with each team.

During his career, Johnson was a seven-time NFL Pro Bowler, named to four All-Pro teams, and emerged as one of the NFL's most productive wide receivers of his era. In 2024, Johnson was selected for induction into the Pro Football Hall of Fame, becoming the first player to start their career with the Texans to be inducted.

== Early life ==
Johnson was born in Miami, on July 11, 1981. He attended Miami Senior High School, where he graduated in 1999. He played high school football and was rated as one of the top prospects in the country. As a senior, Johnson caught 32 passes for 931 yards and was named a Parade All-American.

== College career ==
Johnson enrolled at the University of Miami, where he was a standout wide receiver on the Miami Hurricanes football team from 2000 to 2003. He was co-MVP of the 2002 Rose Bowl, in which the Hurricanes defeated the Nebraska Cornhuskers by a score of 37–14 to cap an undefeated season and their fifth national championship. In that game, Johnson connected with quarterback Ken Dorsey for two touchdowns and 199 yards. Johnson finished his college career catching 92 passes for 1,831 yards (19.9-yard average) and 20 touchdowns. His 1,831 receiving yards is ranked fifth on the University of Miami's all-time career list.

Johnson was inducted into the Miami Sports Hall of Fame on April 10, 2014, at a ceremony in Miami.

As a University of Miami player, Johnson also ran for the Hurricanes track and field team. In 2002, he won the Big East 60-meter dash with a time of 6.81 seconds at the Big East Indoor Championship and followed that up by winning the 100-meter dash with a career-best time of 10.59 seconds at the Big East Outdoor Championships. He won the 200-meter dash at the 2003 GMAC Championships with a career-best time of 21.48 seconds. Also a top competitor in the 400 meters, he ran a career-best time of 46.47 seconds in the finals of the 2003 FHSAA Class 3A Championships.

== Professional career ==
Pre-draft measurables
Height	Weight	Arm length	Hand span	40-yard dash	20-yard shuttle	Vertical jump	Broad jump	Wonderlic
6 ft 2 in (1.88 m)	230 lb (104 kg)	34 in (0.86 m)	9 1/8 in (0.23 m)	4.41 s	4.10 s	39 in (0.99 m)	11 ft 0 in (3.35 m)	23
All values from NFL Combine, except for 40-yd and 20-ss from Miami Pro Day

=== Houston Texans ===
==== 2003 ====
Johnson was selected in the first round with the third overall pick in the 2003 NFL draft by the Houston Texans. He severed ties with NFL agents Michael Huyghue and Jeff Moorad before hiring sports attorney Don West Jr. to negotiate his rookie contract with the Texans. Johnson was signed to a six-year, $39 million contract and was able to start training camp on time due to a timely contract negotiation. His rookie contract included over $13.501 million in guaranteed compensation.

In Johnson's rookie season, he started and played in all 16 games, recording 66 receptions for 976 yards and four touchdowns for the 5–11 Texans. He had three games going over the 100-yard mark on the year, one of which was his first NFL multi-touchdown game in week 3 against the Kansas City Chiefs in a 42–14 loss. He was named to the NFL All-Rookie Team.

==== 2004 ====
Johnson's breakout year came in 2004 when he combined with Texans quarterback David Carr to record 79 catches for 1,142 yards and six touchdowns in the Texans 7–9 season. He had four games going over the 100-yard mark, including a 170-yard, two-touchdown day against the Minnesota Vikings in week 5. He was selected to his first Pro Bowl in recognition of his successful season.

==== 2005 ====
In week 12, Johnson had 12 receptions for 159 yards and a touchdown against the St. Louis Rams in a 33–27 loss. In week 16, against the Jacksonville Jaguars, he had seven receptions for 119 yards and a touchdown in a 38–20 loss. Johnson played in 13 games due to injury and had 63 receptions with 688 yards and two touchdowns as the Texans finished a franchise-worst 2–14. When interviewed in 2012, Johnson said that he was frustrated with the team's struggles, even saying that at times he "didn't want to get up and go to work", but knew that with a new franchise, struggles were expected and he wanted to be there to see the team make the next step.

==== 2006 ====
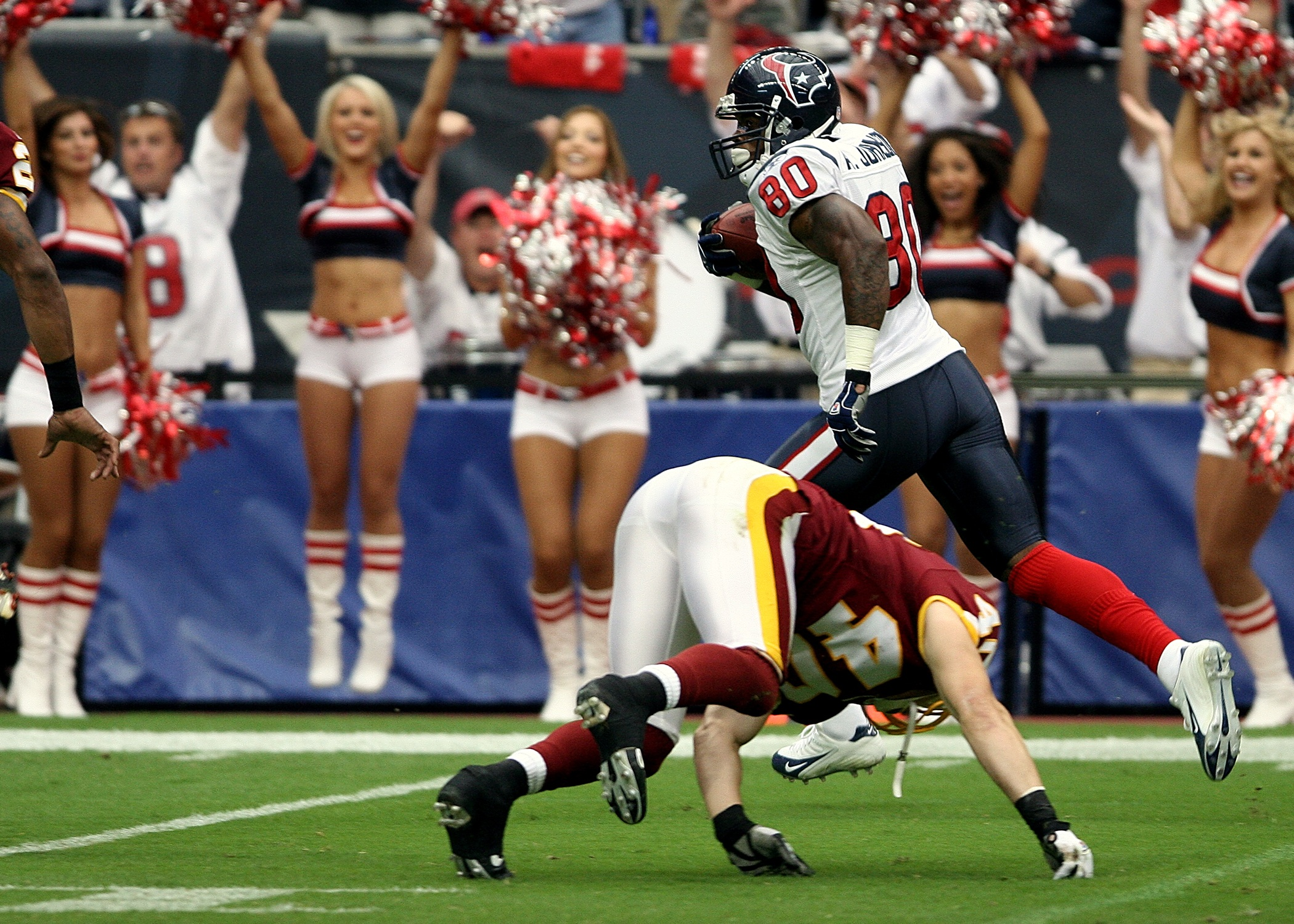
Johnson evading a defender in 2006

Johnson returned from injury and started all 16 games. In week 3, against Washington, he had 11 receptions for 152 yards in a 31–15 loss. In week 4, against the Miami Dolphins, he earned AFC Offensive Player of the Week with nine receptions for 101 yards and a touchdown in a 17–15 victory. He led the NFL in receptions with 103 and finished with 1,147 yards and five touchdowns in the Texans 6–10 season. He made his second Pro Bowl appearance.

==== 2007 ====
On March 3, 2007, the Texans signed Johnson to a six-year extension; the deal was worth $60 million and includes $15 million in guarantees.

Johnson started the 2007 season with seven receptions for 142 yards and a touchdown against the Kansas City Chiefs in a 20–3 victory in week 1. In week 2, against the Carolina Panthers, he had seven receptions for 120 receiving yards and two touchdowns in a 34–21 victory. Starting in week 3, Johnson missed seven games due to injury. He returned mid-season to finish with 851 receiving yards and a career-high eight receiving touchdowns as the Texans went 8–8. He led the league in receiving yards per game in 2007 with 95.6.

==== 2008 ====
For his efforts in the month of October, Johnson earned AFC Offensive Player of the Month. In the month, he had 41 total receptions and had games with 131, 178, 141, and 143 receiving yards. On December 14, 2008, Johnson recorded his first 200-yard game with 207 yards and one touchdown in the Texans' 13–12 win over their AFC South rival Tennessee Titans. Johnson finished the 2008 season recording career highs in receptions and receiving yards totaling 115 receptions for 1,575 yards (both of which lead the league) and touchdown receptions with eight. This same season, Johnson became the first player in NFL history to record seven games with at least 10 receptions. He was named to the Pro Bowl and was a First-team All-Pro.

==== 2009 ====
In week 2, against the Tennessee Titans, Johnson had ten receptions for 149 yards and two touchdowns in the 34–31 victory. In week 5, against the Arizona Cardinals, he had eight receptions for 101 yards and two touchdowns in the 28–21 loss. In the following game against the Cincinnati Bengals, he had eight receptions for 135 yards in the 28–17 victory. In week 14, against the Seattle Seahawks, he had 11 receptions for 193 yards and two touchdowns in the 34–7 victory. He followed that up with nine receptions for 196 receiving yards in the 16–13 victory over the St. Louis Rams in week 15. In the 2009 season, Johnson once again led the league in receiving yards with 1,569 on 101 receptions and a career-high nine touchdowns to lead the Texans to a 9–7 record, the first winning record in franchise history. Johnson joined Jerry Rice as the only two receivers since the merger to lead the league in receiving yards in consecutive seasons. However, the Texans narrowly missed the playoffs on tiebreakers to the Baltimore Ravens and New York Jets, who also finished with a 9–7 record but had better conference records. Once again, Johnson was named to both the Pro Bowl and the First-team All-Pro.

==== 2010 ====
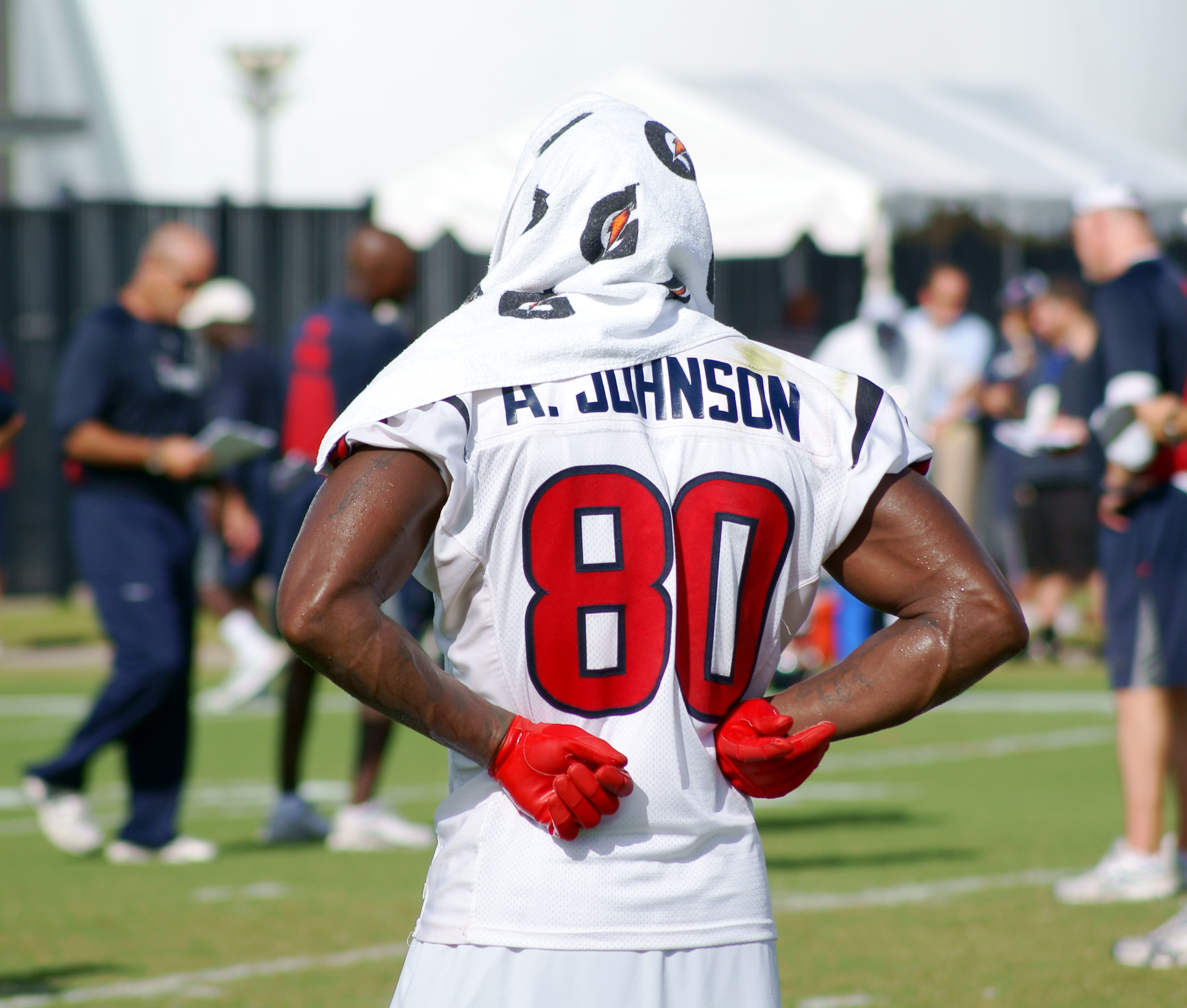
Johnson at Houston Texans' training camp in 2010

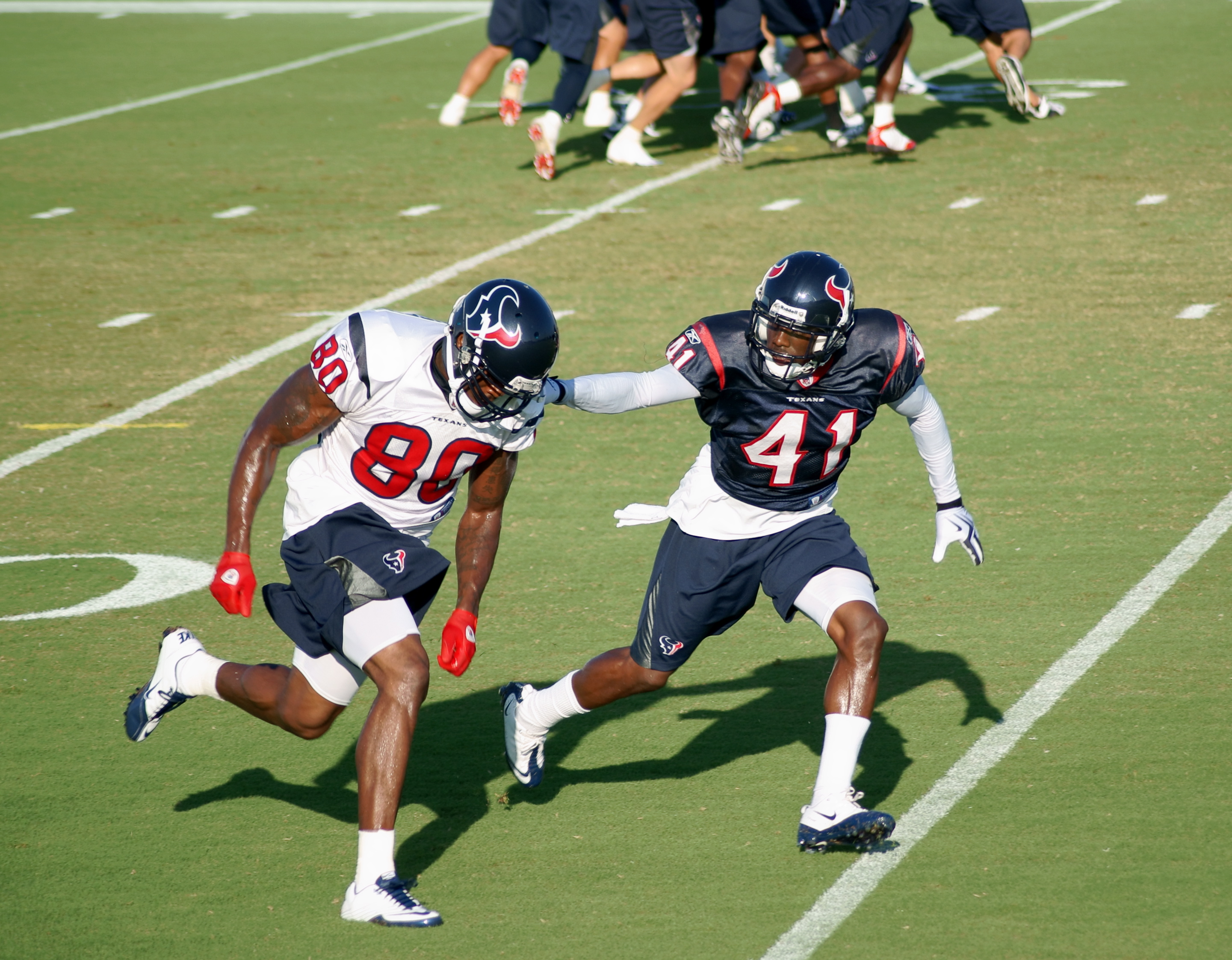
Johnson (#80) during Texans practice in 2010

On August 4, 2010, Johnson became the highest paid wide receiver in NFL history when he signed a two-year contract extension, keeping him under contract through the 2016 season.

In week 2, a 30–27 victory over the Washington Redskins, he had 12 receptions for 158 yards and a touchdown to earn AFC Offensive Player of the Week. In week 6, against the Kansas City Chiefs, he had eight receptions for 138 yards and a touchdown in the 35–31 victory. In week 10 against the Jacksonville Jaguars, he had nine receptions for 146 yards and a touchdown in the 31–24 loss. In week 12, against the Tennessee Titans, Johnson became the first player in NFL history to have 60 or more receptions in each of his first eight seasons. In the same game, he fought Tennessee Titans cornerback Cortland Finnegan. After being jammed hard off the line of scrimmage by Finnegan to the head and neck area repeatedly throughout the game, Johnson lost his temper and pulled off Finnegan's helmet. Finnegan then removed and threw Johnson's helmet down-field and was promptly thrown to the ground by his jersey. Johnson then proceeded to strike Finnegan on the back of his head and neck before being pulled away by the referee. Johnson and Finnegan were ejected from the game, but not suspended. Both were fined $25,000 for their unsportsmanlike actions. In week 13, against the Philadelphia Eagles, he had six receptions for 149 yards in the 34–24 loss. In the following game, he had nine receptions for 140 yards and two touchdowns against the Baltimore Ravens in the 34–28 loss. Johnson finished the 2010 season with 86 receptions for 1,216 yards and eight touchdowns. He was invited to the 2011 Pro Bowl, but the Texans finished 6–10 and missed the playoffs once again. He was ranked seventh by his fellow players on the NFL Top 100 Players of 2011.

==== 2011 ====
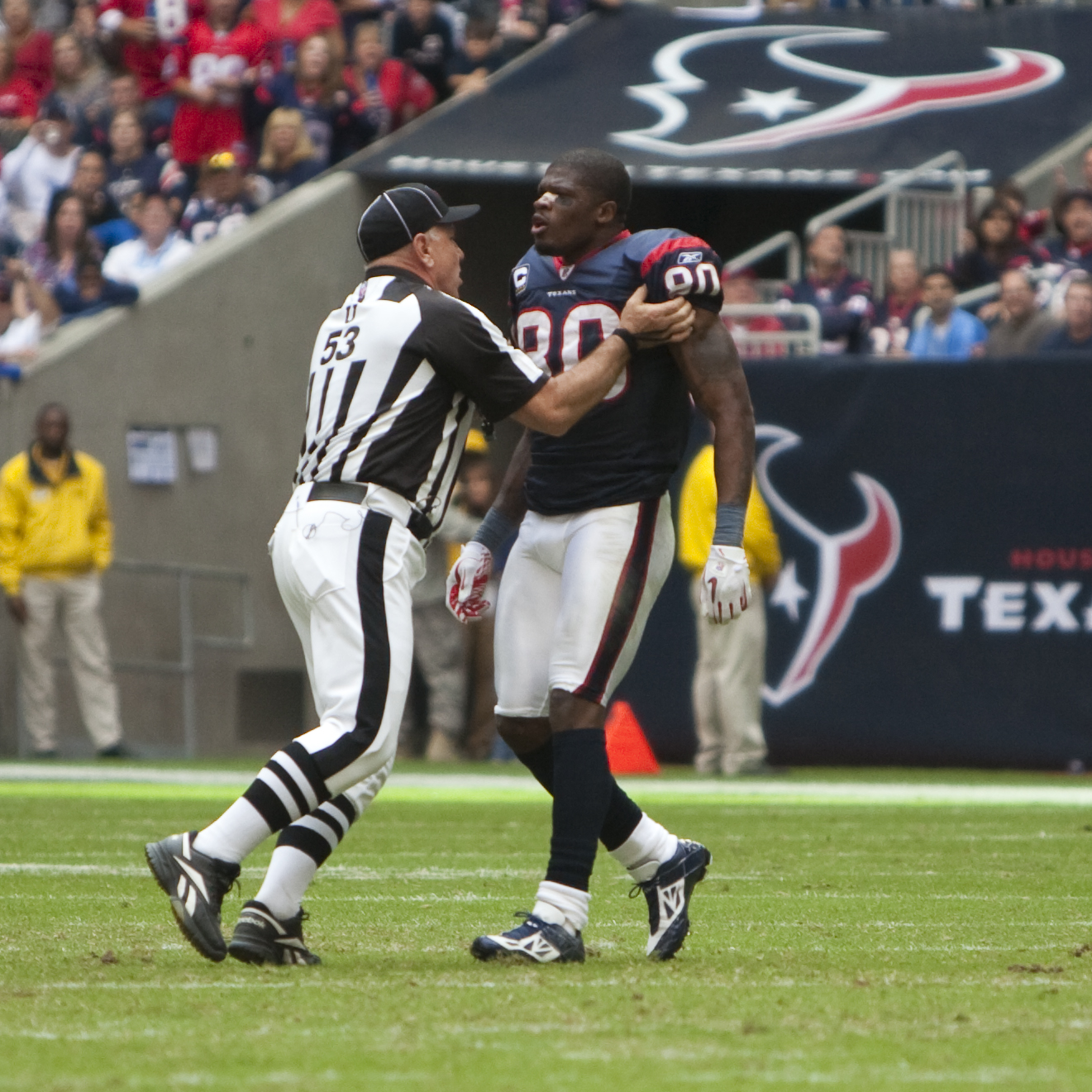
Johnson with the Houston Texans in 2010

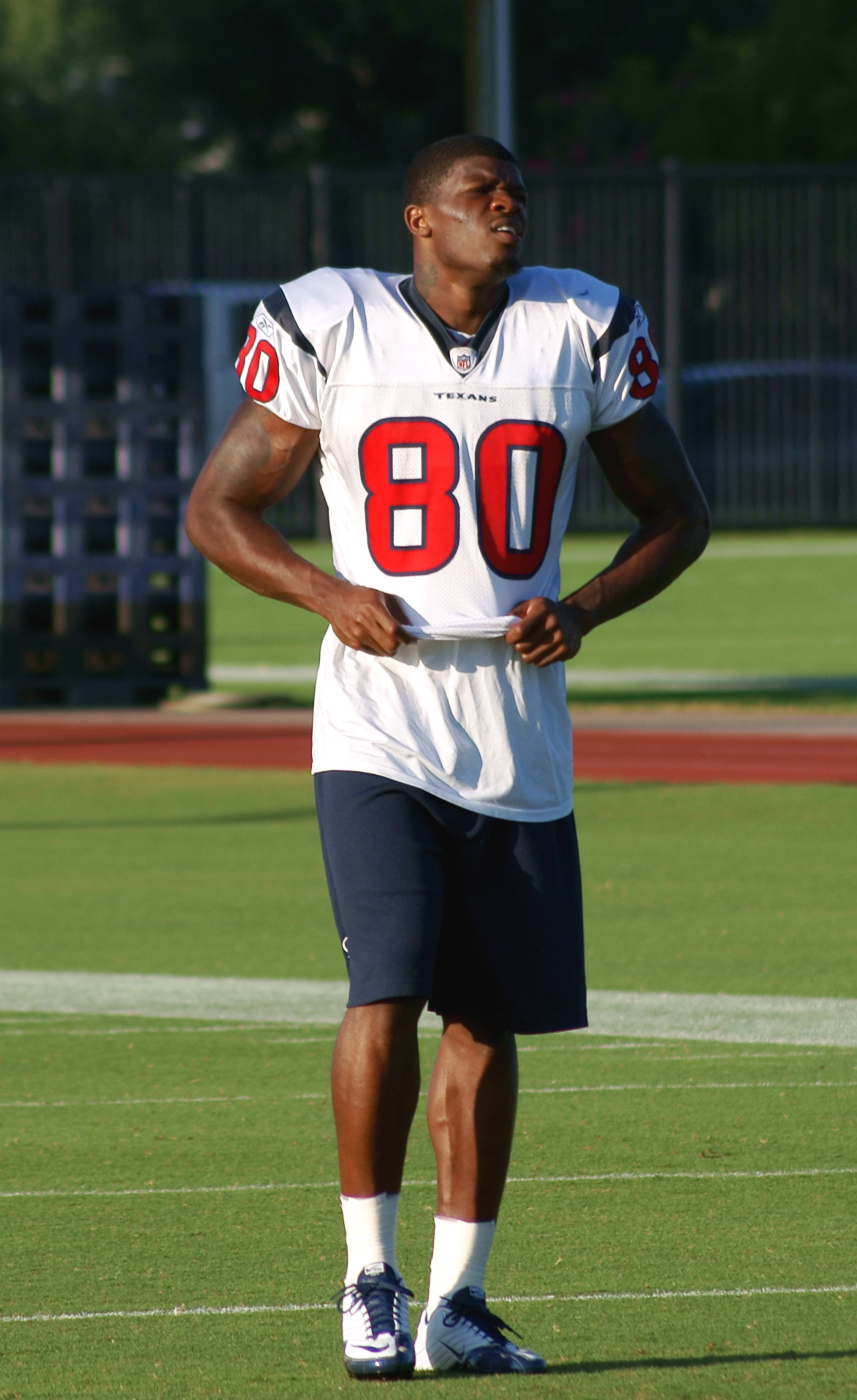
Johnson in 2010

In the first three weeks, Johnson had caught seven passes in each of the first three games for at least 90 yards per game and had two touchdown catches. However, just as running back Arian Foster had returned from a hamstring injury, Johnson suffered one of his own in week 4 against the Pittsburgh Steelers. In the second quarter, as Johnson caught a pass from Matt Schaub, he went down untouched, grabbing his right hamstring. The injury caused him to miss nine games and playing limited snaps in the other three. Johnson finished the season with career-lows in games played (7), receptions (33), yards (492), and touchdowns (2), but the Texans, in their tenth season in the NFL, made the playoffs for the first time in franchise history by winning the AFC South Division with a 10–6 record.

Johnson made his playoff debut against the Cincinnati Bengals in the Wild Card Round on January 7, 2012. In the game, Johnson had five receptions for 90 yards, including a 40-yard touchdown catch. The Texans won 31–10 and advanced to the Divisional Round where they fell to the Baltimore Ravens 20–13. Johnson caught eight passes for 111 yards in the losing effort. He was ranked 15th by his fellow players on the NFL Top 100 Players of 2012.

==== 2012 ====
Johnson started off the 2012 season with eight receptions for 119 receiving yards and one touchdown in a 30–10 victory over the Miami Dolphins. In week 6, Johnson became the first Texan in franchise history to reach the 10,000 receiving yards milestone during a loss to the Green Bay Packers in 2012.

On November 18, 2012, Johnson had the best game of his career in a week 11 victory over the Jacksonville Jaguars. He had 14 receptions for 273 yards in that game, including the 48-yard game-winning touchdown in overtime. His receiving total was ninth-most in a game in NFL history and was the most for any receiver since Terrell Owens had 283 yards for the San Francisco 49ers in 2000. On November 22, Johnson had nine receptions for 188 yards in a week 12 victory, again in overtime, over the Detroit Lions on Thanksgiving Thursday, crossing 1,000 receiving yards for the sixth time in his career. Johnson set the NFL record for the highest receiving total in back-to-back games with 461 yards, beating the previous record of 450 yards set by Chad Johnson. Due to Johnson's efforts, he was named the AFC Offensive Player of the Month. In week 15, against the Indianapolis Colts, he had 11 receptions for 151 receiving yards and a touchdown in the 29–17 victory. In the regular season finale against the Colts, he had 12 receptions for 141 receiving yards in the 28–16 loss.

Johnson finished the 2012 NFL season second in receiving yards with a career-high 1,598 yards after Calvin Johnson and fourth in receptions with 112 receptions after Johnson, Brandon Marshall, and Wes Welker. Johnson had one of the best seasons of his career even though he played through a groin injury that limited his production during the first half of the season. Many analysts doubted he would not be able to return to top form after his injury in 2011 and his limited production during the first half of the season. Johnson had his third 1,500+ yard season in his career. He is tied with Marvin Harrison for the second-most 1,500+ yard seasons with three, after Jerry Rice who has four. Johnson was selected to play in the 2013 Pro Bowl, his sixth selection of his career. Johnson was voted onto the 2012 All-Pro Team's Second-team, his fifth All-Pro selection in his career. He was ranked 14th by his fellow players on the NFL Top 100 Players of 2013.

==== 2013 ====
Johnson started out the 2013 season with 12 receptions for 146 receiving yards in a 31–28 victory over the San Diego Chargers. In week 4, against the Seattle Seahawks, he had nine receptions for 110 yards in the 23–20 loss. In week 9, against the Indianapolis Colts, he had nine receptions for 229 receiving yards and three receiving touchdowns in the 27–24 loss. In the game, Johnson became the second-fastest player in NFL history to reach 12,000 career receiving yards. In week 11, against the Oakland Raiders, he had ten receptions for 116 receiving yards in the 28–23 loss. In week 13, against the New England Patriots, he had eight receptions for 121 receiving yards in the 34–31 loss. In the following game against the Jacksonville Jaguars, he had 13 receptions for 154 receiving yards in the 27–20 loss. He appeared in and started all 16 games for the Texans. He had 109 receptions for 1,407 yards and five touchdowns. He was named to his final Pro Bowl. He was ranked 21st by his fellow players on the NFL Top 100 Players of 2014.

==== 2014 ====
In the 2014 season, Johnson appeared in, and started, 15 games. He had 85 receptions for 936 yards and three touchdowns in what was his final season with the Texans.

On March 2, 2015, Johnson was informed that he would not be starting for the Texans for the 2015 season. He was given permission to seek a trade and if unsuccessful, he requested to be cut. After failing to find a team willing to trade for Johnson, the Texans released him on March 9, 2015.

=== Indianapolis Colts ===
On March 11, 2015, Johnson agreed to a three-year, $21 million contract with the Indianapolis Colts.

With the retirement of Reggie Wayne, 34-year-old Johnson began the 2015 season as the NFL's active leader in receiving yards, which he remained until passed by Steve Smith Sr. in week 4 of 2016. The best game of Johnson's 2015 season came against his former team, the Houston Texans, where he caught six passes for 77 yards and two touchdowns. Johnson was released on March 9, 2016. In his only season with the Colts, Johnson made 41 receptions for 503 yards and four touchdowns.

=== Tennessee Titans ===
On July 29, 2016, Johnson agreed to a two-year contract with the Tennessee Titans. In his lone season with the Titans and final season in the NFL, he appeared in only eight games and started four. He had nine receptions for 85 yards and two touchdowns. One of his touchdowns was a fourth down game-winner against the Detroit Lions in week 2 from Marcus Mariota.

=== Retirement ===
Johnson announced his retirement on October 31, 2016. On April 19, 2017, Johnson signed a one-day contract with the Texans so he could officially retire as a member of the team. During his farewell press conference he said his only regret was not bringing a championship to Houston and "even when I was with the Colts and the Titans, my heart never left this place." On November 19, 2017, Johnson was the first-ever inductee into the Texans Ring of Honor.

On February 8, 2024, Johnson was selected to be inducted into the Pro Football Hall of Fame, in his third year of both eligibility and as a finalist. Johnson became the first Texans player to be inducted into the Hall of Fame since the franchise's founding in 2002.

== Career statistics ==
=== NFL ===
Legend
	Led the league
**Bold**	Career high

==== Regular season ====
Year	Team	Games		Receiving					Rushing					Fumbles	
Year	Team	GP	GS	Rec	Yds	Avg	Lng	TD	Att	Yds	Avg	Lng	TD	Fum	Lost
2003	HOU	16	16	66	976	14.8	46T	4	5	−10	−2.0	11	0	0	0
2004	HOU	16	16	79	1,142	14.5	54T	6	4	12	3.0	14	0	1	1
2005	HOU	13	13	63	688	10.9	53T	2	**6**	10	1.7	5	0	1	1
2006	HOU	16	16	103	1,147	11.1	53	5	3	**14**	4.7	**18**	0	1	0
2007	HOU	9	9	60	851	14.2	**77T**	8	—	—	—	—	—	1	1
2008	HOU	16	16	**115**	1,575	13.7	65	8	—	—	—	—	—	1	1
2009	HOU	16	16	101	1,569	**15.5**	72T	**9**	2	10	5.0	7	0	1	0
2010	HOU	13	13	86	1,216	14.1	60	8	2	10	5.0	7	0	1	0
2011	HOU	7	7	33	492	14.9	50	2	1	8	**8.0**	8	0	0	0
2012	HOU	16	16	112	**1,598**	14.3	60T	4	—	—	—	—	—	0	0
2013	HOU	16	16	109	1,407	12.9	62T	5	—	—	—	—	—	0	0
2014	HOU	15	15	85	936	11.0	35	3	—	—	—	—	—	**3**	**3**
2015	IND	16	14	41	503	12.3	35	4	—	—	—	—	—	0	0
2016	TEN	8	4	9	85	9.4	20	2	—	—	—	—	—	0	0
Total		193	187	1,062	14,185	13.4	77	70	23	54	2.3	18	0	10	7

==== Postseason ====
Year	Team	Games		Receiving					Fumbles	
Year	Team	GP	GS	Rec	Yds	Avg	Lng	TD	Fum	Lost
2011	HOU	2	2	**13**	**201**	**15.5**	**40**	**1**	0	0
2012	HOU	2	2	12	157	13.1	22	0	0	0
Total		4	4	25	358	14.3	40	1	0	0

=== College ===
Season	Team	GP	Receiving		
Season	Team	GP	Rec	Yds	TD
2000	Miami	11	3	57	1
2001	Miami	11	37	682	10
2002	Miami	12	52	1,092	9
Total		35	92	1,831	20

== Career highlights ==
=== Awards and honors ===
NFL

- 7× Pro Bowl (2004, 2006, 2008, 2009, 2010, 2012, 2013)
- 2× First-team All-Pro (2008, 2009)
- 2× Second-team All-Pro (2006, 2012)
- 3× NFL Alumni Wide Receiver of the Year (2006, 2008, 2009)
- 2× NFL receiving yards leader (2008, 2009)
- 3× AFC receiving yards leader (2008, 2009, 2012)
- 2× AFC Offensive Player of the Month (October 2008, November 2012)
- 4× NFL Top 100 — 7th (2011), 15th (2012), 14th (2013), 21st (2014)
- 1,000 receptions club
- 10,000 receiving yards club

College

- BCS national champion (2001)
- Third-team All-American (2002)

Other honors

- Texas Sports Hall of Fame
- Houston Sports Hall of Fame

=== Records ===
==== NFL records ====
- Most games with 10+ receptions in a season: 7 (tied with Wes Welker and Brandon Marshall)
- Most seasons with 100+ receptions and 1,400+ yards: 4

==== Texans franchise records ====
- Most career receptions: 1,012
- Most career receiving yards: 13,597
- Most career receiving touchdowns: 64
- Most receptions in a single season: 115 (2008)
- Most receiving yards in a single season: 1,598 (2012)
- Most seasons with 100+ receptions: 5
- Best receiving yards per game average (season): 99.9 (2012)

== Personal life ==
In 2003, Johnson's rookie season, he founded the Andre Johnson Foundation for children and teens growing up in single-parent homes. He has a daughter, Kylie, who was born in February 2010.

On December 4, 2012, Johnson made headlines around the world when it was shared that he spent over $19,000 for kids aged 8–16 in Child Protective Services to have a shopping spree at Toys "R" Us. Johnson's own foundation, the Andre Johnson Charitable Foundation, funded the spree. The shopping spree is an event that Johnson partakes in yearly; however, due to a photo of him holding up lengthy receipts, this was the first year the shopping spree generated worldwide attention. After the spree, Johnson also joined the Houston Police Department's Blue Santa program to surprise 800 students at Houston's Bastian Elementary School with Christmas presents.
