= J. J. Moses =

American football player (born 1979)

No. 86, 84, 82
- Position: Wide receiver

Personal information
- Born: September 12, 1979 (age 47); Waterloo, Iowa, U.S.
- Listed height: 5 ft 6 in (1.68 m)
- Listed weight: 175 lb (79 kg)

Career information
- High school: Waterloo East
- College: Iowa State (1997-2000)
- NFL draft: 2001: undrafted

Career history
- Kansas City Chiefs (2001)*; Green Bay Packers (2001)*; Kansas City Chiefs (2001-2002)*; Scottish Claymores (2002); Green Bay Packers (2002); Houston Texans (2003–2004); Chicago Bears (2005)*; Arizona Cardinals (2005)
- * Offseason or practice squad member only

Awards and highlights
- First-team All-Big 12 (2000)
- Stats at Pro Football Reference

Jerry James Moses Jr. (born September 12, 1979), better known as J. J. Moses, is an American former professional football player. He played wide receiver at Iowa State University and for the Green Bay Packers, Houston Texans, and Arizona Cardinals in the National Football League (NFL). During his career, he was listed as the shortest player in the NFL, at 5'6". Now he serves as a preacher, usher, and new beginning pastor at Lakewood church as a believer.

== Early life ==
Moses was born in Waterloo, Iowa and attended Waterloo East High School in Waterloo, Iowa.

== College career ==
After high school, Moses attended Iowa State University, where he continued his football career. He played primarily as wide receiver for the Iowa State Cyclones, as well as returning kickoffs and punts. In his senior season, Moses led the team in receiving yards and was named team MVP.

=== Statistics ===
			Receiving						Rushing					
Year	GP	GS	Rec	Yds	Ydr	Lng	TD	Ypg	Att	Yds	Avg	Lng	TD	Ypg
1997	5	0	0	0	0	0	0	0	15	52	3.5	13	0	10.4
1998	11	11	13	155	11.9	62	0	14.1	23	80	3.5	20	0	7.3
1999	11	11	18	296	16.4	28	2	26.9	17	120	7.1	29	1	10.9
2000	11	11	53	775	14.6	78	4	70.5	16	153	9.6	58	2	13.9
Total	25	25	84	1,226	14.6	78	6	32.3	71	405	5.7	58	3	10.7

== Professional career ==
During his professional career, Moses primarily played as a kick returner and punt returner. He played for the Green Bay Packers, Houston Texans, and Arizona Cardinals, mostly on special teams. He also played for the Scottish Claymores of NFL Europe, where he was the #1 punt returner for the 2002 season.

=== Statistics ===
Regular season

Year	Team	G	GS	Punt Return									Kick Return								
Year	Team	G	GS	Ret	RetY	Avg	Lng	TD	20+	40+	FC	Fum	Ret	RetY	Avg	Lng	TD	20+	40+	FC	Fum
2002	GB	2	0	5	12	2.4	8	0	0	0	0	0	4	69	17.3	27	0	1	0	0	0
2003	HOU	15	0	36	244	6.8	40	0	3	0	7	0	58	1,355	23.4	70	0	38	2	0	0
2004	HOU	15	0	36	309	8.6	27	0	2	1	13	0	59	1,303	22.1	49	0	34	4	0	0
2005	ARI	2	0	7	40	5.7	12	0	0	0	0	0	7	177	25.3	35	0	5	0	0	0
Total		34	0	84	605	7.2	40	0	5	1	20	2	128	2,904	22.7	70	0	78	6	0	0

Source: NFL.com

== Post-playing career ==
After the end of his playing career, Moses became Director of Player Engagement with the Houston Texans. He was popular in this role, but was dismissed after the 2019 season.
