= Domanick Williams =

American football player (born 1980)

No. 37
- Position: Running back

Personal information
- Born: October 1, 1980 (age 46); Lafayette, Louisiana, U.S.
- Listed height: 5 ft 9 in (1.75 m)
- Listed weight: 221 lb (100 kg)

Career information
- High school: Breaux Bridge (LA)
- College: LSU (1999–2002)
- NFL draft: 2003: 4th round, 101st overall pick

Career history
- Houston Texans (2003–2006)

Awards and highlights
- Pepsi NFL Rookie of the Year (2003); PFWA All-Rookie Team (2003); 2× Second-team All-SEC (2001, 2002)

Career NFL statistics
- Rushing attempts: 770
- Rushing yards: 3,195
- Rushing touchdowns: 23
- Receptions: 154
- Receiving yards: 1,276
- Receiving touchdowns: 5
- Stats at Pro Football Reference

Domanick Williams (né Davis; October 1, 1980), known during the majority of his playing career as Domanick Davis, is an American former professional football player who was a running back for three seasons with the Houston Texans of the National Football League (NFL). He played college football for four seasons with the LSU Tigers.

== Career ==
Pre-draft measurables
Height	Weight	Arm length	Hand span	40-yard dash	10-yard split	20-yard split	20-yard shuttle	Three-cone drill	Vertical jump	Broad jump	Bench press
5 ft 9 in (1.75 m)	213 lb (97 kg)	30 in (0.76 m)	9 in (0.23 m)	4.63 s	1.63 s	2.72 s	4.47 s	7.32 s	32 1/2 in (0.83 m)	9 ft 4 in (2.84 m)	22 reps
All values from NFL Combine.

Davis played college football for the LSU Tigers. In his four-year career there, he rushed for 2056 yards and 20 touchdowns, including four touchdowns in the 2002 Sugar Bowl.

Davis was drafted by Houston in the fourth round of the 2003 NFL draft. He was named the 2003 Pepsi NFL Rookie of the Year, an award created in 2002, in which fans vote online from a pool of five candidates to determine the winner. He rushed for 1,000+ yards in his first two seasons in the NFL (2003 and 2004) while scoring 22 touchdowns. As a result, he received a contract extension before the start of the 2005 season. Prior to the extension, Davis was scheduled to make $385,000 in 2005. The extension called for a payout of $22 million over the life of the deal, with $8 million in guaranteed money.

In 2005, Davis rushed for 976 yards in the first 11 games before suffering a knee injury and being placed on injured reserve. He did not play during the 2006 season, and was released by the Texans on March 22, 2007.

== NFL career statistics ==
Year	Team	Games		Rushing						Receiving					Fumbles	
Year	Team	GP	GS	Att	Yds	Avg	Y/G	Lng	TD	Rec	Yds	Avg	Lng	TD	Fmb	Lost
2003	HOU	14	10	238	1,031	4.3	73.6	51	8	47	351	7.5	17	0	4	2
2004	HOU	15	15	302	1,188	3.9	79.2	44	13	68	588	8.6	38	1	4	2
2005	HOU	11	11	230	976	4.2	88.7	44	2	39	337	8.6	33	4	2	1
Career		40	36	770	3,195	4.1	79.9	51	23	154	1,276	8.3	38	5	10	2

== Personal life ==
He changed his surname from Davis to Williams in late 2006.

(on changing his name from Domanick Davis) “And it will be number 31, Domanick Williams. I just had to make a change. I wasn’t really a Davis the whole time, but I have kids of my own and I needed to do what was right.”

(more on the name change) “I just changed Davis to Williams. I wasn’t really a (Davis). It was my older brother’s Dad’s last name and whatever happened I ended up with Davis. So now that I have kids of my own, a little boy and a little girl, ‘Spike’ (Domanick, Jr.) and Liana, I have to change my name to what it really is, and it’s Williams.”
