= David Carr (American football) =

American football player (born 1979)

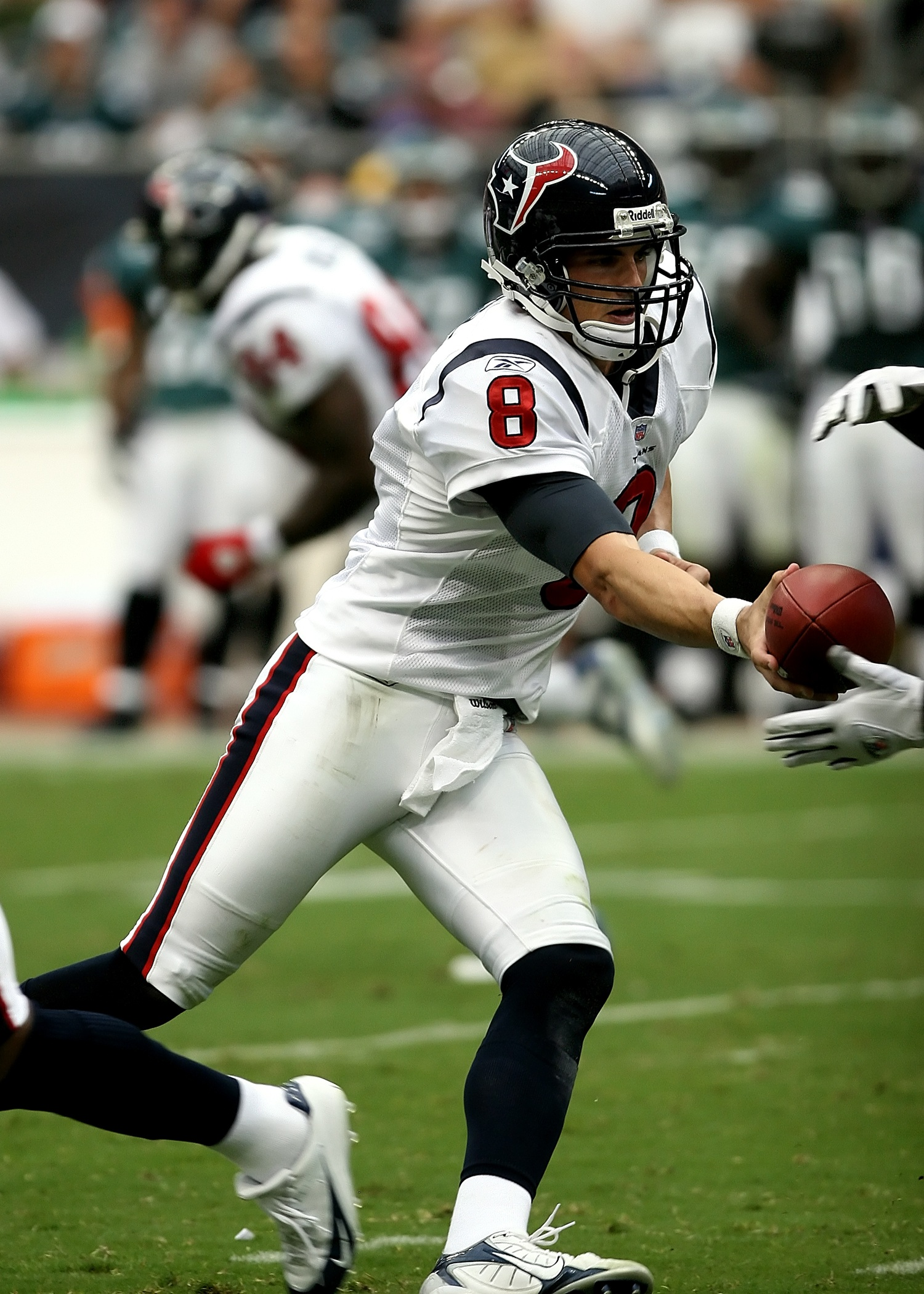
- Carr with the Houston Texans in 2006

No. 8, 5
- Position: Quarterback

Personal information
- Born: July 21, 1979 (age 47); Bakersfield, California, U.S.
- Listed height: 6 ft 3 in (1.91 m)
- Listed weight: 212 lb (96 kg)

Career information
- High school: Stockdale (Bakersfield)
- College: Fresno State (1997–2001)
- NFL draft: 2002: 1st round, 1st overall pick

Career history

Playing
- Houston Texans (2002–2006); Carolina Panthers (2007); New York Giants (2008–2009); San Francisco 49ers (2010); New York Giants (2011–2012)

Coaching
- Bakersfield Christian HS (CA) (2015–present) Offensive coordinator

Awards and highlights
- Super Bowl champion (XLVI); NFL completion percentage leader (2006); PFWA All-Rookie Team (2002); Johnny Unitas Golden Arm Award (2001); Sammy Baugh Trophy (2001); Second-team All-American (2001); NCAA passing yards leader (2001); NCAA passing touchdowns leader (2001); WAC Offensive Player of the Year (2001); Fresno State Bulldogs No. 8 retired; NFL record: Most times sacked in a season: 76 (2002)

Career NFL statistics
- Passing attempts: 2,267
- Passing completions: 1,353
- Completion percentage: 59.7%
- TD–INT: 65–71
- Passing yards: 14,452
- Passer rating: 74.9
- Stats at Pro Football Reference

David Duke Carr (born July 21, 1979) is an American former professional football quarterback who played in the National Football League (NFL) for 11 seasons. Carr played college football for the Fresno State Bulldogs, winning the Johnny Unitas Golden Arm Award and Sammy Baugh Trophy in 2001. He was selected first overall by the Houston Texans in the 2002 NFL draft and was the franchise's first draft selection.

Carr spent his first five seasons as the Texans' starter, but struggled with inconsistent play. As a rookie, he also set the NFL season record for sacks taken. After being released by Houston, Carr spent the remainder of his career as a backup for the Carolina Panthers, New York Giants, and San Francisco 49ers, winning Super Bowl XLVI with the Giants. Carr later served as the offensive coordinator at Bakersfield Christian High School and was an analyst for NFL Network.

== Early life ==
David Carr attended Valley Oak Elementary School in Fresno, California. He continued on to Clovis Unified's Kastner Intermediate School in Fresno, where he proceeded to break a number of California D-I middle school records as quarterback of the Thunderbirds. After moving to Bakersfield, California, Carr attended Stockdale High School.

== College career ==
Carr began as the starting quarterback at California State University, Fresno, during the 2000 and 2001 seasons after redshirting in 1999. While he was quarterback, the Bulldogs went 7–5 and 11–3. In his senior season, Carr led the NCAA in passing yards (4,308) and passing touchdowns (42). The Bulldogs beat Colorado, Oregon State, and Wisconsin, all members of BCS conferences. There was speculation about whether the Bulldogs would qualify for a BCS bid, something then unheard of for a BCS non-automatic qualifying conference team. They climbed to as high as number 8 in the polls, and Carr was on the cover of Sports Illustrated. During his collegiate career, Carr completed 565 of 901 passes for 7,849 yards and threw 65 touchdowns versus 22 interceptions. During his senior year, he won the Johnny Unitas Golden Arm Award and was a finalist for the 2001 Heisman Trophy, finishing fifth.

On September 1, 2007, the Fresno State Bulldogs retired Carr's #8 jersey in his honor. Former Fresno State football player Robbie Rouse (a junior in 2011) was the last player allowed to wear the number.

== Professional career ==
Pre-draft measurables
Height	Weight	Arm length	Hand span	40-yard dash	20-yard shuttle	Three-cone drill	Vertical jump	Broad jump	Wonderlic
6 ft 3 3/8 in (1.91 m)	223 lb (101 kg)	31 3/4 in (0.81 m)	9 3/4 in (0.25 m)	4.67 s	4.28 s	7.05 s	35.0 in (0.89 m)	9 ft 0 in (2.74 m)	24
All values from NFL Combine

=== Houston Texans ===
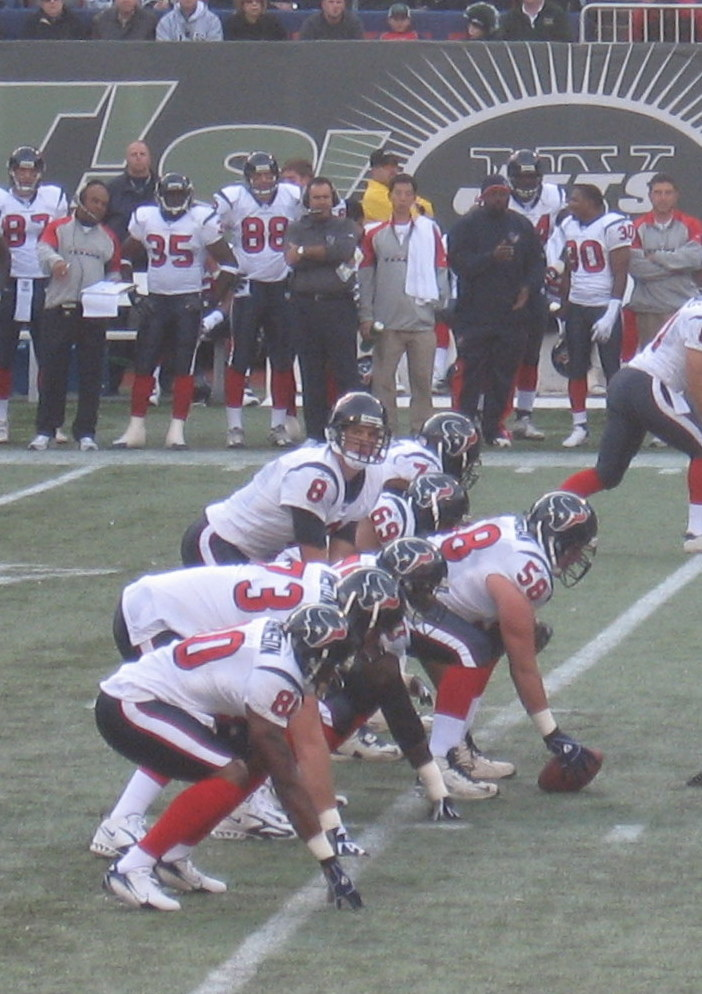
Carr under center for the Texans in 2006

With the first overall pick of the 2002 NFL draft, the Houston Texans, a new expansion team, selected Carr. His professional career began on a productive note. The Texans played their first regular season game on September 8, 2002, defeating the Dallas Cowboys, 19–10, at Houston's Reliant Stadium. Houston became just the second expansion team to win its first game. However, Carr was sacked 76 times during that season, which set a league record. He also set the NFL record for fumble recoveries in a single season, recovering 12 of his own. Kyler Murray set the current record for fumbles recovered with his 13th recovered fumble in the 2021 season. He finished his rookie year of 2002 with 2,592 passing yards, 9 touchdowns, and 15 interceptions. He also rushed for 282 yards and 3 touchdowns. The Texans finished 4–12 in their first franchise year. However, they were hindered by severe injuries to two veterans expected to anchor their offensive line. Left tackle Tony Boselli was sidelined by a botched shoulder surgery that forced his retirement, while right tackle Ryan Young was limited to nine games by a groin injury.

In the 2003 season, Carr played 12 games (11 starts) with 2,103 passing yards, 9 touchdowns, and 13 interceptions. He also rushed for 151 yards with 2 rushing touchdowns and was sacked only 15 times. The Texans finished with a record of 5–11 in 2003.

Carr started all 16 games in 2004 being sacked a league-leading 49 times. He passed for 3,531 yards with 16 touchdowns and 14 interceptions. The Texans finished 7–9 in 2004.

The 2005 season began poorly as the Texans were 1–9 in their first 10 games, and plummeted to a 2–14 record to finish the season. Plagued by injuries and an ineffective offensive line that limited both the running and passing games, Carr still threw for 2,488 yards while being sacked a league-leading 68 times. Despite the drop-off, the Texans exercised an option in Carr's contract that extended him for three years.

The Texans finished the 2006 season at 6–10. For the season, Carr posted a completion percentage of 68.9% (a career-high) and tied the then single-game NFL record of 22 consecutive pass completions (against the Buffalo Bills). However, new Texans general manager Rick Smith decided to go in a different direction at quarterback. Thus, the Texans acquired Matt Schaub from the Atlanta Falcons and decided to release Carr, making him a free agent for the first time of his career. He had been sacked a total of 249 times during his tenure in Houston.

=== Carolina Panthers ===
Carr agreed to terms with the Carolina Panthers on April 6, 2007, signing a two-year, $6.2 million contract. Following an injury to starting quarterback Jake Delhomme, Carr was named the starter. He played in six games (started four games) and had three touchdowns and five interceptions, with a 53.7 completion percentage and a passer rating of 58.3. Carr suffered a back injury during the fifth game of the season (a victory vs. the New Orleans Saints) on a sack by Will Smith, and saw limited action during the remainder of the 2007 season, being replaced by Vinny Testaverde and Matt Moore. He was released on February 27, 2008.

=== New York Giants (first stint) ===
On March 12, 2008, Carr signed a one-year contract with the New York Giants, reuniting with former Houston offensive coordinator Chris Palmer. Subsequently, the Giants released former backup quarterback Jared Lorenzen. Carr backed up Eli Manning for two seasons. In the 2009 offseason, Carr was re-signed to a one-year, $2 million contract on February 9, 2009. In his first two years with the Giants, Carr saw action in seven games and threw three total touchdown passes.

=== San Francisco 49ers ===
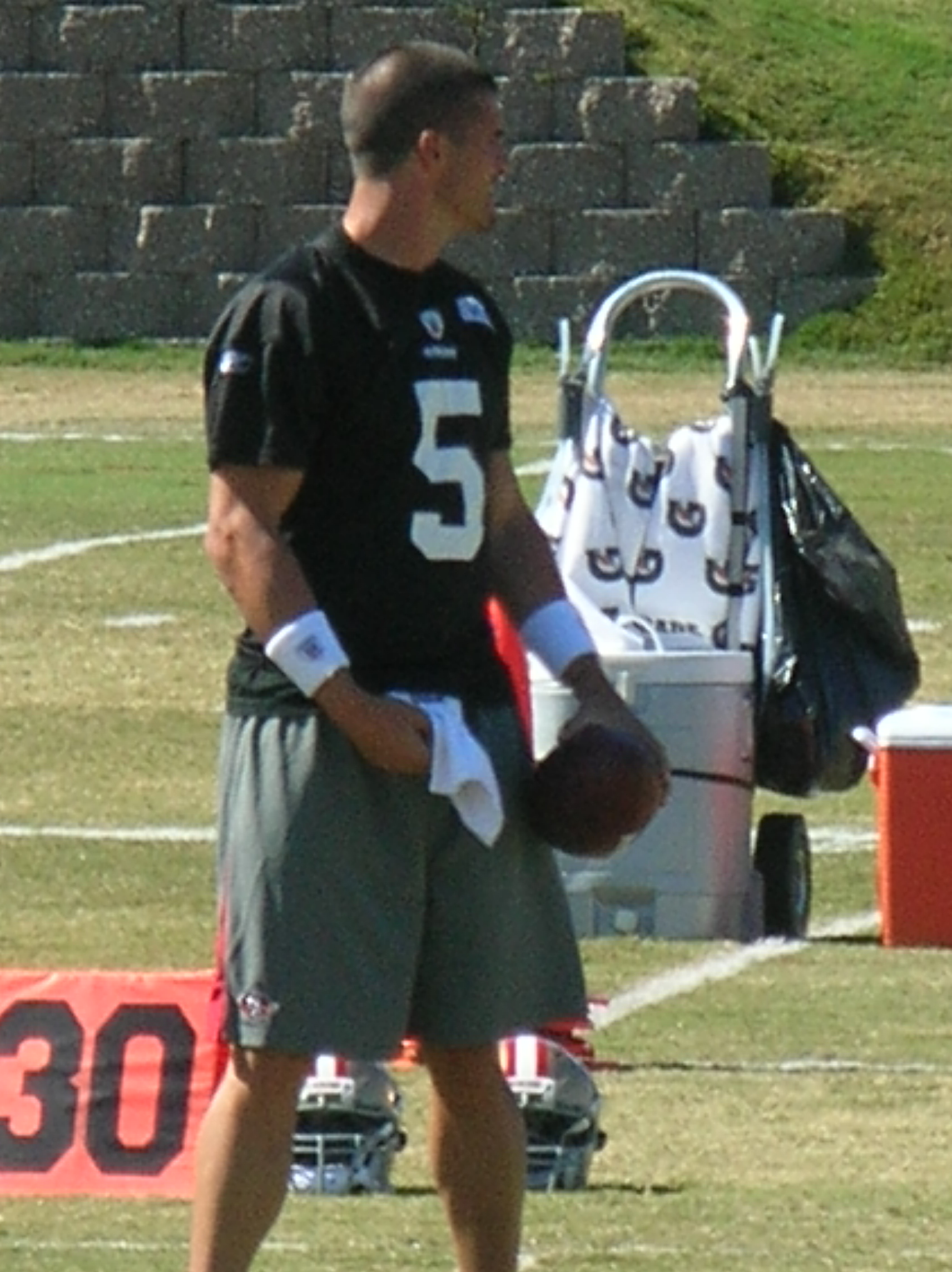
Carr with the 49ers in 2010

On March 7, 2010, Carr agreed to terms with the San Francisco 49ers; he served as a backup to Alex Smith. Carr was put into the 49ers Week 7 game against his former team the Carolina Panthers after Smith suffered a shoulder injury. Carr struggled completing only 5 of 13 passes for 67 yards and throwing a crucial interception late in the 4th quarter. He was released by the 49ers on July 28, 2011.

=== New York Giants (second stint) ===
Carr signed with the Giants on July 31, 2011, as the backup quarterback to starter Eli Manning. Carr received his only Super Bowl ring in the 2011 season after the Giants beat the New England Patriots 21–17 in Super Bowl XLVI. He did not play a single snap during the 2011 regular season. Carr re-signed with the Giants on March 14, 2012, to an additional one-year contract. He was waived by the Giants on August 31, 2013.

=== Legacy ===
Carr's status as a number one draft pick and subsequent career has led to him being considered a draft bust. In 2011, he was included in Foxsports.com's list of the ten worst No. 1 overall picks in NFL Draft history. In 2015, NESN ranked Carr as the 8th worst No. 1 overall pick in NFL Draft history.

== Career statistics ==
=== NFL ===
Legend
	Won the Super Bowl
	NFL record
	Led the league
**Bold**	Career high

Year	Team	Games			Passing								Rushing				Sacks		Fumbles	
Year	Team	GP	GS	Rec	Cmp	Att	Pct	Yds	Avg	TD	Int	Rtg	Att	Yds	Avg	TD	Sck	SckY	Fum	Lost
2002	HOU	**16**	**16**	4−12	233	444	52.5	2,592	5.8	9	**15**	62.8	59	282	4.8	**3**	**76**	411	**21**	**7**
2003	HOU	12	11	3−8	167	295	56.6	2,013	6.8	9	13	69.5	27	151	**5.6**	2	15	90	4	0
2004	HOU	16	16	**7−9**	285	**466**	61.2	**3,531**	**7.6**	**16**	14	**83.5**	**73**	299	4.1	0	49	301	10	2
2005	HOU	16	16	2−14	256	423	60.5	2,488	5.9	14	11	77.2	56	**308**	5.5	1	68	**424**	17	6
2006	HOU	16	16	6−10	**302**	442	**68.3**	2,767	6.3	11	12	82.1	53	195	3.7	2	41	240	16	7
2007	CAR	6	4	1−3	73	136	53.7	635	4.7	3	5	58.3	17	59	3.5	0	13	74	1	0
2008	NYG	3	0	—	9	12	75.0	115	9.6	2	0	144.1	8	10	1.3	0	1	2	0	0
2009	NYG	6	0	—	21	33	63.6	225	6.8	1	0	93.6	9	27	3.0	1	2	11	1	0
2010	SF	1	0	—	5	13	38.5	67	5.2	0	1	23.6	0	0	0.0	0	1	5	0	0
2011	NYG	0	0	DNP																
2012	NYG	2	0	—	2	3	66.7	19	6.3	0	0	84.0	3	-3	-1.0	0	1	6	1	0
Total		94	79	23−56	1,353	2,267	59.7	14,452	6.4	65	71	74.9	305	1,328	4.4	9	267	1,564	71	22

=== College ===
Legend
	Led the NCAA
**Bold**	Career high

Year	Team	GP	Passing						
Year	Team	GP	Cmp	Att	Pct	Yds	TD	Int	Rtg
1997	Fresno State	4	5	11	45.5	53	0	1	67.7
1998	Fresno State	7	22	41	53.7	228	1	1	103.5
1999	Fresno State	Redshirt							
2000	Fresno State	11	194	316	61.4	2,338	18	**11**	135.4
2001	Fresno State	14	**344**	**533**	**64.5**	**4,839**	**46**	9	**165.9**
Career		36	565	901	62.7	7,458	65	22	151.2

=== NFL records ===
- Most times sacked, season: 76, 2002

== Post-playing career ==
He is currently on NFL Network as an analyst.

In 2015, Carr became offensive coordinator at Bakersfield Christian High School, under head coach and younger brother Darren Carr.

== Personal life ==
Carr married high school girlfriend Melody Tipton in March 1999. Together they have five children, three of whom have been diagnosed with Type 1 diabetes, which Carr also has.

His brother Derek was also a quarterback in the NFL until his retirement in 2025. Derek states that David was instrumental to the preparation and training that led up to the 2014 NFL draft and had helped greatly with training and experience after being drafted. The brothers host the football podcast Home Grown.

His uncle Lon Boyett played in the NFL as a tight end with the Buccaneers, Raiders and 49ers from 1977 to 1978.

== See also ==
- List of NCAA major college football yearly passing leaders
- List of NCAA major college football yearly total offense leaders
