= 2003 Baltimore Ravens season =

NFL team season

- Owner: Art Modell
- General manager: Ozzie Newsome
- Head coach: Brian Billick
- Home stadium: M&T Bank Stadium

Results
- Record: 10–6
- Division place: 1st AFC North
- Playoffs: Lost Wild Card Playoffs (vs. Titans) 17–20
- Pro Bowlers: RB Jamal Lewis; TE Todd Heap; T Jonathan Ogden; OLB Peter Boulware; MLB Ray Lewis; CB Chris McAlister; FS Ed Reed; ST Adalius Thomas

Uniform
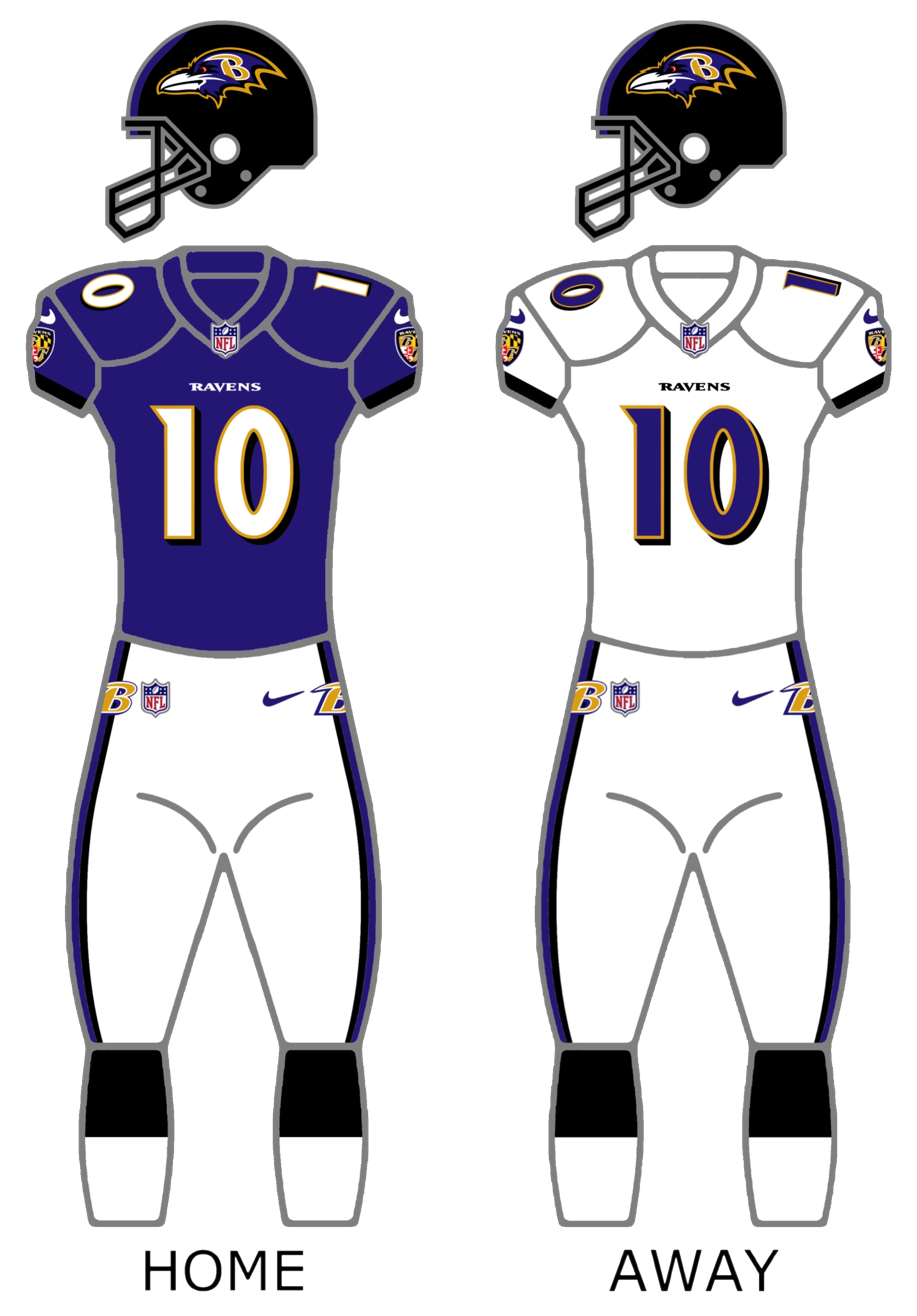

The 2003 Baltimore Ravens season was the team's eighth season in the NFL. They improved upon their previous output of 7–9, winning 10 games and making the third playoff appearance in franchise history. This marked the first season when the Ravens won their division. One memorable moment came in week 2, when Jamal Lewis set the NFL record for most rushing yards in a single game, rushing for 295 yards against the Cleveland Browns. Lewis went on to rush for 2,066 yards on the season and was named NFL Offensive Player of the Year. In addition, Ray Lewis was named Defensive Player of the Year and 2003 first round pick Terrell Suggs was named Defensive Rookie of the Year.

The Ravens’ home stadium was renamed “M&T Bank Stadium’, a name which has remained unchanged ever since.

In Week 12 against the Seattle Seahawks, Baltimore fought from a seventeen-point deficit halfway through the 4th quarter to force overtime, winning 44–41. The game was named to NFL Top 10 as #9 on Top Ten Comebacks.

The Ravens season ended in the Wild Card round of the playoffs, when they lost 20–17 to the Steve McNair-led Tennessee Titans.

Shortly after the loss Art Modell sold his majority ownership (retaining 1%) of the team to minority owner Steve Bisciotti.

== Offseason ==
=== Draft ===
2003 Baltimore Ravens draft
Round	Pick	Player	Position	College	Notes
1	10	Terrell Suggs *	DE	Arizona State	
1	19	Kyle Boller	QB	California	
3	77	Musa Smith	RB	Georgia	
4	109	Jarret Johnson	DE	Alabama	
4	134	Ovie Mughelli *	FB	Wake Forest	
5	146	Aubrayo Franklin	DT	Tennessee	
5	173	Tony Pashos	OT	Illinois	
6	182	Gerome Sapp	S	Notre Dame	
7	223	Trent Smith	TE	Oklahoma	
7	250	Mike Mabry	C	Central Florida	
7	258	Antwoine Sanders	S	Utah	
Made roster † Pro Football Hall of Fame * Made at least one Pro Bowl during career

== Personnel ==
=== Staff / Coaches ===
2003 Baltimore Ravens staff
Front office: Owner and CEO – Art Modell; President and coo – David Modell; Minority owner – Steve Bisciotti; General manager/executive vice president – Ozzie Newsome; Director of player personnel – Phil Savage; Director of football administration – Pat Moriarty; Director of college scouting – Eric DeCosta; Director of pro personnel – George Kokinis; Assistant director of pro personnel – Vincent Newsome; Head coaches: Head coach – Brian Billick; Offensive coaches: Offensive coordinator – Matt Cavanaugh; Quarterbacks/wide receivers – David Shaw; Running backs – Matt Simon; Tight ends/assistant offensive line – Wade Harman; Offensive line – Jim Colletto	Defensive coaches: Defensive coordinator – Mike Nolan; Defensive line – Rex Ryan; Outside linebackers – Phil Zacharias; Inside linebackers – Mike Singletary; Defensive backs – Donnie Henderson; Defensive assistant – Dennis Thurman; Special teams coaches: Special teams coordinator – Gary Zauner; Assistant special teams – Bennie Thompson; Coaching assistant/quality control – Mike Pettine; Strength and conditioning: Head athletic trainer – Bill Tessendorf; Strength and conditioning – Jeff Friday; Assistant strength and conditioning – Paul Ricci

=== Roster ===
2003 Baltimore Ravens roster
Quarterbacks (QB): 8 Kyle Boller; 7 Chris Redman; 2 Anthony Wright; Running backs (RB): 31 Jamal Lewis; 33 Harold Morrow; 34 Ovie Mughelli FB; 39 Alan Ricard FB; 29 Chester Taylor KR; 32 Musa Smith; Wide receivers (WR): 83 Ron Johnson; 87 Marcus Robinson; 81 Frank Sanders; 89 Travis Taylor; Tight ends (TE): 86 Todd Heap; 88 John Jones; 82 Terry Jones	Offensive linemen (OL): 66 Bennie Anderson G; 77 Ethan Brooks T; 78 Orlando Brown T; 72 Damion Cook T; 62 Mike Flynn C; 64 Edwin Mulitalo G; 75 Jonathan Ogden T; 61 Casey Rabach C/G; Defensive linemen (DL): 94 Marques Douglas DE; 69 Aubrayo Franklin NT; 97 Kelly Gregg NT; 76 Jarret Johnson DE; 92 Maʻake Kemoeatu NT; 91 Riddick Parker DE; 98 Anthony Weaver DE	Linebackers (LB): 58 Peter Boulware OLB; 90 Cornell Brown OLB; 56 Edgerton Hartwell ILB; 52 Ray Lewis ILB; 57 Bart Scott ILB; 53 T. J. Slaughter ILB; 55 Terrell Suggs OLB; Defensive backs (DB): 28 Gary Baxter CB/FS; 45 Lamont Brightful CB/KR/PR; 47 Will Demps FS; 26 Corey Fuller CB; 22 Tom Knight CB; 21 Chris McAlister CB; 20 Ed Reed SS; 27 Gerome Sapp FS; 38 Raymond Walls CB; 49 Chad Williams SS; Special teams (ST): 59 Joe Maese LS; 9 Wade Richey K; 43 Mike Solwold LS; 3 Matt Stover K; 15 Dave Zastudil P	Practice squad: 70 Nate Bolling DE; 17 Todd Devoe WR; 65 Michael Early G; 18 Kareem Kelly WR; 73 Lawrence Smith G; Reserve: 51 Bernardo Harris LB (IR); 84 Javin Hunter WR (IR); 80 Randy Hymes WR (IR); 79 Tony Pashos T (IR); 48 Trent Smith TE (IR); 96 Adalius Thomas LB (IR); Rookies in italics 53 active, 6 reserve, 5 practice squad

== Schedule ==
=== Preseason ===
Week	Date	Opponent	Result	Record
1	August 9	Buffalo Bills	**L** 19–20	0–1
2	August 16	at Atlanta Falcons	**W** 13–10	1–1
3	August 23	at Washington Redskins	**L** 3–24	1–2
4	August 28	New York Giants	**L** 24–30	1–3

=== Regular season ===
In addition to their regular games with AFC North divisional rivals, the Ravens played games against the AFC West and NFC West according to the NFL schedule rotation introduced in 2002, and also played against the Jacksonville Jaguars and the Miami Dolphins, who finished 2002 third in the two remaining AFC divisions.

Week	Date	Opponent	Result	Record	Attendance
1	September 7	at **Pittsburgh Steelers**	**L** 15–34	0–1	63,157
2	September 14	**Cleveland Browns**	**W** 33–13	1–1	69,473
3	September 21	at San Diego Chargers	**W** 24–10	2–1	52,028
4	September 28	Kansas City Chiefs	**L** 10–17	2–2	69,459
5	Bye				
6	October 12	at Arizona Cardinals	**W** 26–18	3–2	24,193
7	October 19	at **Cincinnati Bengals**	**L** 26–34	3–3	53,553
8	October 26	Denver Broncos	**W** 26–6	4–3	69,723
9	November 2	Jacksonville Jaguars	**W** 24–17	5–3	69,486
10	November 9	at St. Louis Rams	**L** 22–33	5–4	66,085
11	November 16	at Miami Dolphins	**L** 6–9 (OT)	5–5	73,333
12	November 23	Seattle Seahawks	**W** 44–41 (OT)	6–5	69,477
13	November 30	San Francisco 49ers	**W** 44–6	7–5	69,549
14	December 7	**Cincinnati Bengals**	**W** 31–13	8–5	69,468
15	December 14	at Oakland Raiders	**L** 12–20	8–6	45,398
16	December 21	at **Cleveland Browns**	**W** 35–0	9–6	72,548
17	December 28	**Pittsburgh Steelers**	**W** 13–10 (OT)	10–6	70,001
Note: Intra-divisional opponents are in **bold** text.

=== Postseason ===
Week	Date	Opponent	Result	Record	Attendance
Wild Card	January 3	Tennessee Titans	**L** 17–20	0–1	69,452

== Division standings ==
AFC North
	W	L	T	PCT	DIV	CONF	PF	PA	STK
^{(4)} Baltimore Ravens	10	6	0	.625	4–2	7–5	391	281	W2
Cincinnati Bengals	8	8	0	.500	3–3	6–6	346	384	L2
Pittsburgh Steelers	6	10	0	.375	3–3	5–7	300	327	L1
Cleveland Browns	5	11	0	.313	2–4	3–9	254	322	W1

== Game summaries ==
=== Regular season ===
==== Week One at Pittsburgh Steelers ====
Three Tommy Maddox touchdowns raced the Steelers to a 27–0 lead, more than enough to win 34–15. Kyle Boller managed only 152 yards with an interception and a late touchdown.

==== Week Two vs. Cleveland Browns ====
Jamal Lewis erupted for 295 rushing yards and two scores in a 33–13 rout of the Browns. Lewis’ rampage offset another weak performance by quarterback Kyle Boller with just seven completions.

==== Week Three at San Diego Chargers ====
Kyle Boller once again failed to reach 100 yards passing but did have a touchdown while Jamal Lewis reached 132 yards rushing and added a touchdown in a 24–10 win at Qualcomm Stadium. Drew Brees was intercepted three times.

==== Week Four vs. Kansas City Chiefs ====
Despite limiting the Chiefs to 265 yards of offense the Ravens fell 17–10 on a Dante Hall 87-yard return score and three interceptions by Kyle Boller.

==== Week Six at Arizona Cardinals ====
Cardinals quarterback Jeff Blake had played for the Ravens (coming off their bye week) the year before and here was intercepted three times; Chris McAlister ran back one pick for a score while Ed Reed scored on a blocked punt. It was enough to win 26–18 and offset yet another weak performance from Kyle Boller (nine completions for 75 yards and 61.1 passer rating).

==== Week Seven at Cincinnati Bengals ====
For seven seasons Marvin Lewis had been Ravens defensive coordinator and he had the long-slumping Bengals beginning a competitive turnaround; Cincinnati's 34–26 win over his former team took a step in that direction. The Ravens fumbled twice and Jon Kitna, filling in for the season before rookie Carson Palmer would assume the starting role, threw for 274 yards and three touchdowns. The Ravens loss happened even as Kyle Boller hit 302 yards, two scores, and passer rating at 104.

==== Week Eight vs. Denver Broncos ====
For the second straight year the Ravens hosted and defeated the Broncos, this time 26–6. With Jake Plummer and Steve Beuerlein injured Danny Kanell started and was intercepted twice. Former Raven Shannon Sharpe was limited to two catches. Despite the win Brian Billick was angry over NFL replay challenges after a Ravens touchdown was overruled on replay.

==== Week Nine vs. Jacksonville Jaguars ====
Kyle Boller had a touchdown and nine other completions in a 24–17 win over Baltimore's former division rival. The Ravens fumbled once and Akin Ayodele scored for the Jaguars on the return.

==== Week Ten at St. Louis Rams ====
Four years earlier the Ravens had been humiliated by the Rams and Brian Billick wrapped up his debut game by saying “We don’t have enough paper to list my frustration.” In this 33–22 loss he saw his Ravens cough up four fumbles while Kyle Boller had another interception; he injured his knee on a collision with fullback Alan Ricard and eventually gave way to former starter Chris Redman; Redman threw two more picks.

==== Week Eleven at Miami Dolphins ====
The Ravens decided to start veteran quarterback Anthony Wright at Miami. In a battle of field goals the game went to overtime. After the Dolphins had to punt in overtime, Wright fumbled while handing off to Jamal Lewis and the ensuing Dolphins field goal ended a 6–9 Ravens loss.

==== Week Twelve vs. Seattle Seahawks ====
The turning point in the Ravens season came against the Seahawks, whom they’d only faced once before. The game was only tied 3–3 with one minute to go in the first half when the Seahawks scored then grabbed a Chester Taylor fumble and scored on the next play. Anthony Wright managed touchdowns to Marcus Robinson but a Jamal Lewis fumble set up a Seahawks drive deep in their territory with the Ravens trailing 24–41. It was here that Ed Reed blocked a Seahawks punt and scored. Ray Lewis then forced and grabbed a Seahawks fumble and after getting sacked on consecutive plays Wright completed a 40-yard pass off Robinson's hands caught by Frank Sanders. Robinson caught the subsequent touchdown, then the Ravens stopped a fourth down attempt (a mistake in resetting the game clock on this drive appeared to give the Ravens thirty extra seconds). A Seahawks interference penalty set up the tying Matt Stover field goal. After stopping the Seahawks in overtime (former Ravens quarterback Trent Dilfer had to come in for one play during the overtime, where he threw an incompletion) the Ravens won on another Stover kick. The 44–41 win was doubly emotional for Wright as immediately afterward he raced to the hospital in time for his wife to deliver their daughter.

==== Week Thirteen vs. San Francisco 49ers ====
The Ravens exploded to 44 points for the second straight game and the second straight against a visiting NFC West opponent but competitive fireworks were not necessary as they intercepted Jeff Garcia four times; Ray Lewis scored on one pick while Anthony Wright had two more touchdowns. The two teams combined for 546 yards vs. the 426 the Ravens had put up by themselves the previous week.

==== Week Fourteen vs. Cincinnati Bengals ====
The Ravens completed a rare three game home stand by downing the upstart Bengals 31–13. Baltimore rushed for 223 yards with three scores and forced five Cincinnati turnovers, offsetting two Anthony Wright interceptions.

==== Week Fifteen at Oakland Raiders ====
Baltimore's surge to the playoffs hit a speed bump in a 12–20 loss to the faltering Raiders. Three Ravens turnovers neutralized 149 rushing yards led by Jamal Lewis at 125 yards and aided Raiders starter Rick Mirer in completing for 186 yards and a score to Jerry Rice.

==== Week Sixteen at Cleveland Browns ====
The ex-Browns traveled to Cleveland and reasserted themselves in a 35–0 shutout win. The Ravens rushed for 276 yards and three touchdowns as Jamal Lewis, on his way to 2,000 yards, accounted for 205 yards and two scores for a season total of 500 yards against the Browns; Anthony Wright had another touchdown, and Baltimore's vaunted defense forced four Browns turnovers.

==== Week Seventeen vs. Pittsburgh Steelers ====
The bitterness of this rivalry meant the 6–9 Steelers refused to roll over. An 81-yard touchdown by punter Josh Miller tied the game in the third. The Steelers went up 10–7 before a Ravens field goal tied the game. Jerome Bettis’ fumble at the two-minute warning set up a 52-yard Stover field goal. When Tommy Maddox was intercepted with 26 seconds to go Anthony Wright completed two passes for 32 yards but a 51-yard kick was no good. In overtime the Steelers were forced to punt and a 22-yard Wright pass led to Stover’s winning kick and the first division title for the Ravens.

=== Postseason vs Tennessee Titans ===
Baltimore's five game winning streak over Tennessee dating to 2000 came to an end in a tense grinder of a game. Jamal Lewis was held to just 39 yards of offense. After the Titans took a 7–0 lead Will Demps picked off Steve McNair and scored. Following multiple punts and another McNair pick a Ravens field goal put them up 10–7 at the half, until McNair's 49-yard strike to Justin McCareins put Tennessee back up 14–10. Trailing 17–10 in the fourth Anthony Wright found Todd Heap on a 35-yard score. McNair was intercepted again but the Ravens had to punt with 2:56 to go, where McNair completed four passes and Gary Anderson scored the winning field goal.
