= Ed Reed =

American football player, coach, and administrator (born 1978)

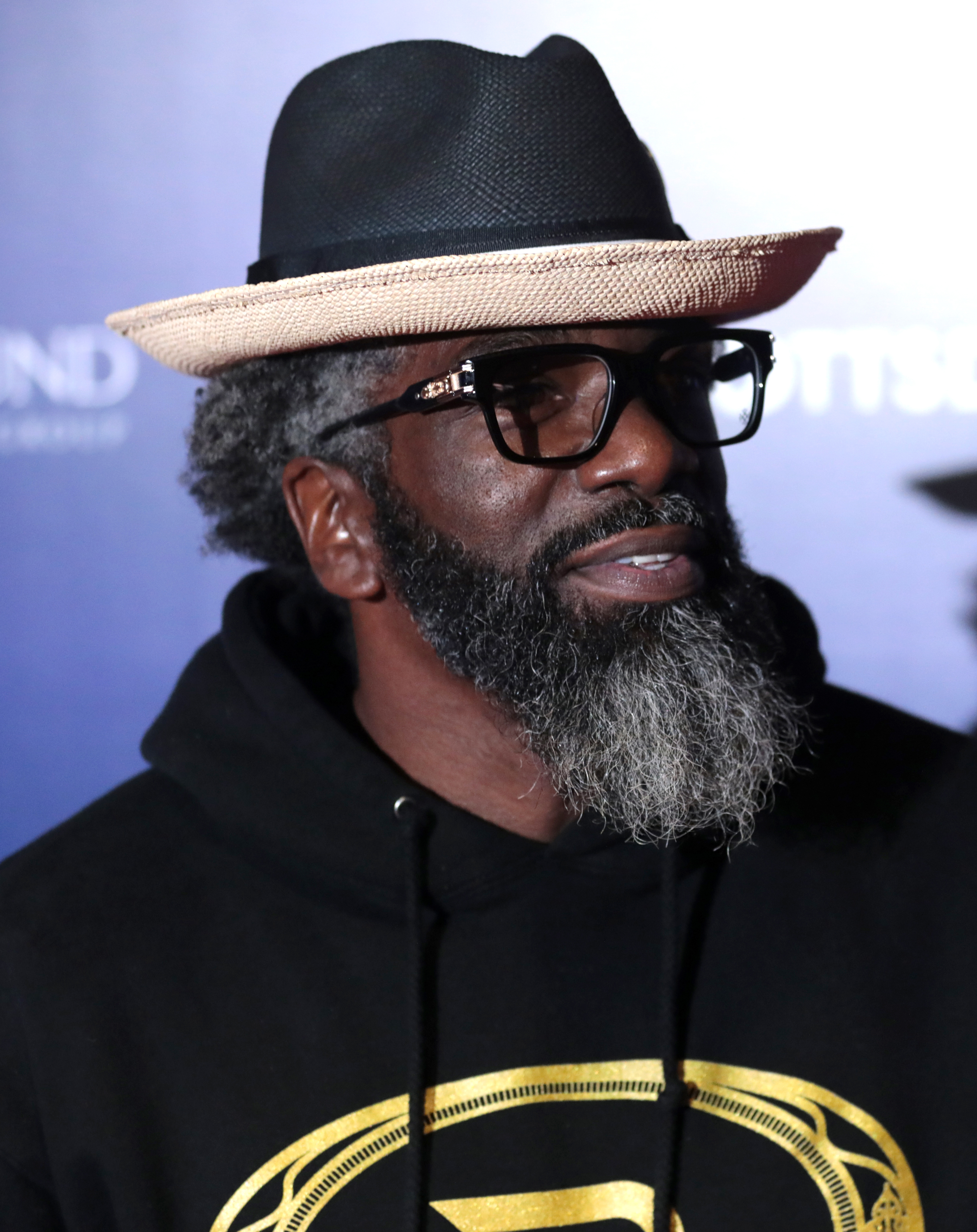
- Reed in Scottsdale, Arizona in 2023

No. 20, 22
- Position: Safety

Personal information
- Born: September 11, 1978 (age 48); St. Rose, Louisiana, U.S.
- Listed height: 5 ft 11 in (1.80 m)
- Listed weight: 205 lb (93 kg)

Career information
- High school: Destrehan (Destrehan, Louisiana)
- College: Miami (1997–2001)
- NFL draft: 2002: 1st round, 24th overall pick

Career history

Playing
- Baltimore Ravens (2002–2012); Houston Texans (2013); New York Jets (2013)

Coaching
- Buffalo Bills (2016) Assistant defensive backs coach

Operations
- Miami (FL) (2020–2022); Chief of staff (2020–2021); Senior football advisor (2022)

Awards and highlights
- Super Bowl champion (XLVII); NFL Defensive Player of the Year (2004); NFL Alumni Defensive Back of the Year (2008); 5× First-team All-Pro (2004, 2006–2008, 2010); 3× Second-team All-Pro (2003, 2009, 2011); 9× Pro Bowl (2003, 2004, 2006–2012); 3× NFL interceptions leader (2004, 2008, 2010); NFL 2000s All-Decade Team; NFL 100th Anniversary All-Time Team; PFWA All-Rookie Team (2002); Baltimore Ravens Ring of Honor; BCS national champion (2001); Co-Big East Defensive Player of the Year (2001); Unanimous All-American (2001); Consensus All-American (2000); NCAA interceptions leader (2001); 2× First-team All-Big East (2000, 2001); Second-team All-Big East (1999); First-team AP All-Time All-American; Miami Hurricanes Ring of Honor; NFL records: Most career interception return yards: 1,590; Longest interception return: 107 yards; Most career postseason interceptions: 9 (tied); Most seasons leading league in interceptions: 3 (2004, 2008, 2010; tied with Everson Walls)

Career NFL statistics
- Interceptions: 64
- Interception yards: 1,590
- Pass deflections: 139
- Total tackles: 646
- Forced fumbles: 11
- Fumble recoveries: 13
- Sacks: 6.0
- Defensive touchdowns: 13
- Stats at Pro Football Reference
- Pro Football Hall of Fame
- College Football Hall of Fame

Edward Earl Reed Jr. (born September 11, 1978) is an American former professional football player who was a safety in the National Football League (NFL), spending the majority of his career with the Baltimore Ravens. He played college football for the Miami Hurricanes, where he played on Miami's 2001 national championship team and was named a unanimous All-American. He was selected by the Ravens in the first round of the 2002 NFL draft and played 11 seasons with them before playing with the Houston Texans and New York Jets in 2013.

During his playing career, Reed was selected to nine total Pro Bowls, was the NFL Defensive Player of the Year in 2004, won Super Bowl XLVII, and has an NFL record for the two longest interception returns (106 yards in 2004 and 107 yards in 2008). He also holds the all-time NFL record for interception return yards, with 1,590, and postseason interceptions (9, tied with three other players). His 64 regular season interceptions ranked him 6th on the NFL's all-time leader list at the time of his retirement. Due to his accolades, Reed is considered to be one of the greatest safeties in NFL history, and was often referred to as a "ball hawk" during his prime. Reed was known for studying film to memorize opposing teams' tendencies, as well as his ability to lure quarterbacks into throwing interceptions. Reed was inducted into the Pro Football Hall of Fame in 2019.

In 2016, Reed worked as an assistant defensive backs coach for the Buffalo Bills. In 2020, he was hired by the University of Miami, his alma mater, to serve as their football team's chief of staff, an advisory role to head coach Manny Diaz.

== Early life ==
Reed was born in St. Rose, St. Charles Parish, Louisiana, on September 11, 1978. He attended Destrehan High School in Destrehan, Louisiana. With the Fighting Wildcats football team, he was an all-state selection at defensive back and as a kick returner and also the New Orleans Times-Picayune District Most Valuable Defensive Player.

Reed totaled 83 tackles, seven interceptions, three forced fumbles and 12 passes deflected in his senior year while also seeing action at running back and quarterback. He also returned three punts for touchdowns. Reed also played basketball, baseball, and track & field. His jersey number 20 was retired by the football team in 2005.

=== Track and field ===
In addition to football, Reed was a standout track athlete at Destrehan High School. He was a member of the state champion 4 × 100 meters relay squad. He set a high school record throw of 56.94 meters (186 ft 10 in) in the javelin throw. Also a standout performer in the long jump and triple jump, he recorded personal bests in high school of over 24 feet (7.3 m) and over 46 feet (14 m), respectively.

While in college, Reed joined the Miami Hurricanes track and field team in 2000, where he competed as a jumper and javelin thrower. He placed 7th in the triple jump at the 2000 Big East Championships, setting a career-best jump of 14.58 meters (47 ft 10 in). In addition, he finished 3rd in the javelin throw, with a personal-best throw of 60.08 meters (197 ft 1 in).

== College career ==
Reed received an athletic scholarship to attend the University of Miami, where he was a standout defensive back for coach Butch Davis and coach Larry Coker's Miami Hurricanes football teams from 1997 to 2001. Reed was a member of the Hurricane's 2001 National Championship team.

After redshirting in the 1997 season, Reed led the team with two interceptions and four forced fumbles in the 1998 season. He had two more interceptions in the 1999 season. Reed was recognized as a consensus first-team All-American in the 2000 season, and a unanimous first-team All-American in the 2001 season. In 2001, he led the nation with nine interceptions for 209 yards, which was a school record, and three touchdowns. He helped seal a memorable win over Boston College in 2001 when he grabbed the ball out of teammate Matt Walters's hands, who had just intercepted it, and raced 80 yards for a touchdown. Reed was honored as the Big East Defensive Player of the Year in 2001, and was named National Defensive Player of the Year by Football News. He was a finalist for the Jim Thorpe Award and was a semifinalists for the Bronko Nagurski Trophy.

Reed set several records during his time at the University of Miami. He holds the record for career interceptions with 21, career interception return yards with 389, and interceptions returned for touchdowns with five. He also blocked four punts during his four-year career. In addition, he was a member of the track and field team during his years at Miami and was a Big East champion in the javelin.

Reed and Indianapolis Colts wide receiver Reggie Wayne were roommates during their time at the University of Miami. He graduated in 2001 with a bachelor's degree in liberal arts. Reed was inducted into the University of Miami Sports Hall of Fame as part of its Class of 2012 at a banquet held in Miami on March 29, 2012.

Reed was inducted into the College Football Hall of Fame on January 7, 2018.

== Professional career ==
Pre-draft measurables
Height	Weight	40-yard dash
5 ft 11 in (1.80 m)	201 lb (91 kg)	4.57 s
All values from NFL Combine

=== Baltimore Ravens ===
The Baltimore Ravens selected Reed in the first round (24th overall) of the 2002 NFL draft. Reed was the second safety drafted, after Oklahoma's Roy Williams was selected eighth overall by the Dallas Cowboys.

==== 2002 ====
On August 3, 2002, the Baltimore Ravens signed Reed to a five-year, $6.18 million contract.

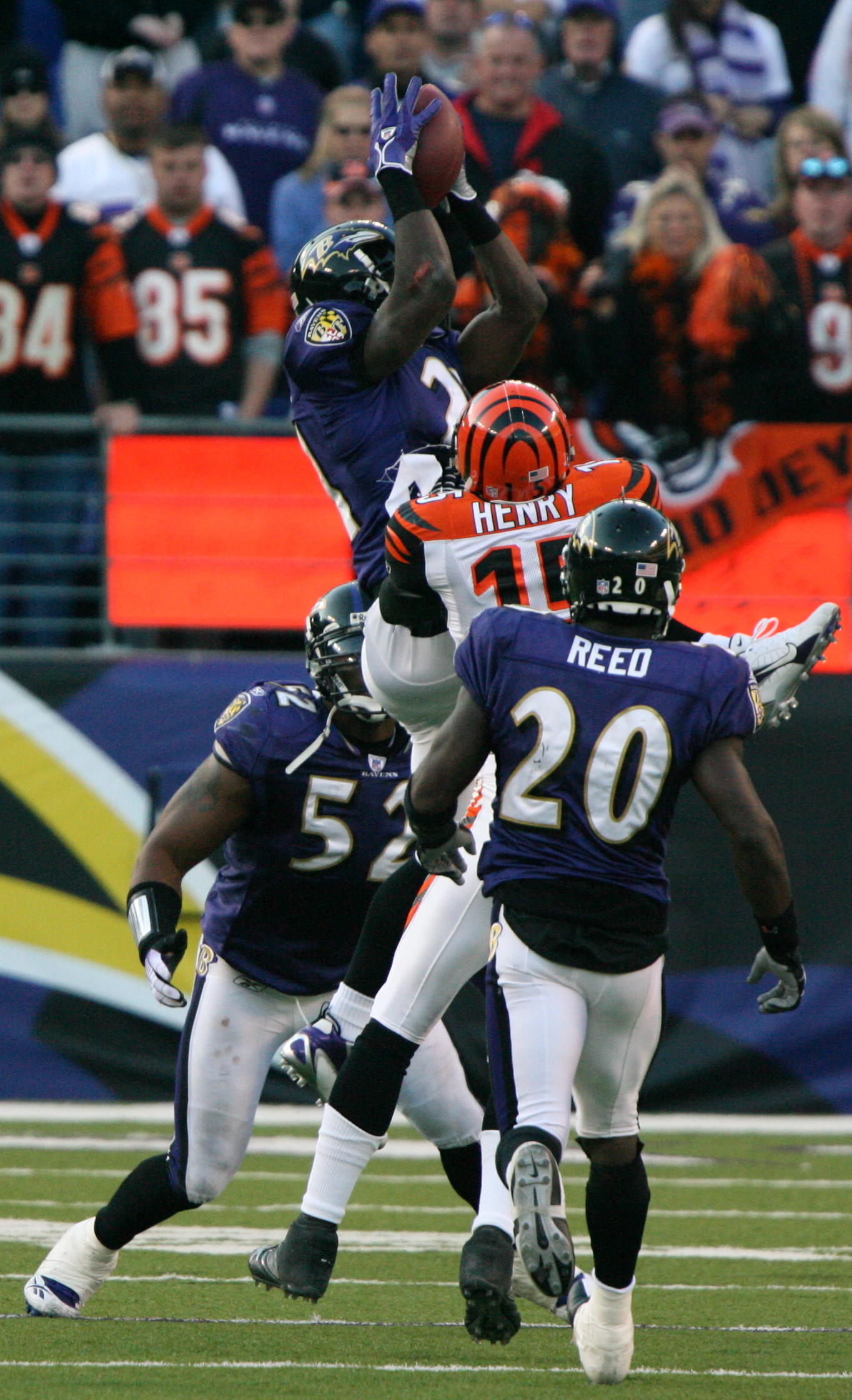
Reed (20), Ray Lewis, and Chris McAlister playing for the Ravens against Chris Henry of the Cincinnati Bengals in 2006

Reed entered training camp slated as the starting free safety after the role was left vacant due to the departures of Rod Woodson and Corey Harris. Head coach Brian Billick named Reed the starting free safety to begin the regular season, alongside strong safety and fellow rookie Will Demps.

He made his professional regular season debut and first career start in the Baltimore Ravens' season-opener at the Carolina Panthers and recorded three solo tackles in their 10–7 loss. On September 30, 2002, Reed recorded four solo tackles, a pass deflection, blocked a kick, and made his first career interception during a 34–28 win against the Denver Broncos in Week 4. Reed made his first career interception off a pass attempt by Broncos' quarterback Brian Griese and blocked a punt by Tom Rouen in the second quarter to set up a 13-yard drive for a touchdown. The following week, he made three solo tackles, a season-high four pass deflections, and intercepted a pass off of Browns' quarterback Tim Couch during a 26–21 win at the Cleveland Browns in Week 5. In Week 6, Reed recorded three solo tackles and made his first career sack on quarterback Peyton Manning during the Ravens' 22–20 loss at the Indianapolis Colts. The following week, he collected a season-high seven solo tackles as the Ravens defeated the Jacksonville Jaguars 17–10. On November 10, 2002, Reed recorded five solo tackles, two pass deflections, and made a season-high two interceptions off passes by Bengals' quarterback Jon Kitna in the Ravens' 38–27 victory against the Cincinnati Bengals in Week 10. Reed made his first interception of the game in the second quarter and was returning it for a touchdown when Bengals' wide receiver T. J. Houshmandzadeh forced him to fumble the ball by hitting his arm as Reed was extending the ball in celebration. His fumble bounced into the endzone and was eventually recovered by Bengals' wide receiver Peter Warrick for a touchback. He started in all 16 games as a rookie in 2002 and made a career-high 85 combined tackles (71 solo), 12 pass deflections, five interceptions and one sack. The following week against the Tennessee Titans, Reed blocked a first quarter punt by Craig Hentrich and returned it 11 yards for his first career touchdown. The Ravens won the game 13–12. He was named to the NFL All-Rookie Team.

==== 2003 ====
Reed and Will Demps were retained as the starting safeties during the 2003 season. Reed started in the Baltimore Ravens' season-opener at the Pittsburgh Steelers and collected a season-high ten combined tackles (seven solo) and a pass deflection in their 34–15 loss. The following week, he collected three solo tackles, a season-high three pass deflections, a season-high two interceptions, and scored his second career touchdown during a 33–13 victory against the Cleveland Browns in Week 2. He intercepted a pass by Kelly Holcomb in the second quarter and returned it for a 54-yard touchdown. On October 12, 2003, he recorded six combined tackles, deflected a pass, made an interception, and blocked a punt before returning it for a touchdown during a 26–18 victory at the Arizona Cardinals in Week 6. Reed blocked a punt by Scott Player, recovered it, and then returned it for a 22-yard touchdown in the second quarter. In Week 12, he made seven combined tackles and returned a blocked punt by Tom Rouen for a 16-yard touchdown during a 44–41 win against the Seattle Seahawks. He was named AFC Special Teams Player of the Week for Week 6. Reed was selected to the 2004 Pro Bowl, marking the first Pro Bowl selection of his career. He started in all 16 games in 2003 and recorded 71 combined tackles (59 solo), 16 pass deflections, seven interceptions, three touchdowns, and a sack.

The Baltimore Ravens finished first in the AFC North with a 10–6 record and earned a playoff berth. On January 3, 2004, Reed started in his first career playoff game and finished the Ravens' 20–17 loss to the Tennessee Titans in the Wild Card Round with one pass deflection and an interception.

==== 2004: Defensive Player of the Year ====
Defensive coordinator Mike Nolan retained Reed and Will Demps as the starting safeties in 2004. On September 26, 2004, Reed recorded three combined tackles, a season-high three pass deflections, and intercepted two passes by Bengals' quarterback Carson Palmer during a 23–9 win at the Cincinnati Bengals in Week 3. In Week 9, Reed recorded three combined tackles, deflected a pass, and returned an interception by quarterback Jeff Garcia for a 106-yard touchdown as the Ravens defeated the Cleveland Browns 27–13. In Week 12, he collected a season-high nine combined tackles and broke up a pass during a 24–3 loss at the New England Patriots. Reed was named AFC Defensive Player of the Month for November. On December 23, 2004, it was announced that Reed was selected to play in the 2005 Pro Bowl. He started in all 16 games and recorded 76 combined tackles (62 solo), eight pass deflections, a career-high nine interceptions, three forced fumbles, and two sacks.

Reed was named as a First-team All-Pro for the first time. He was named the NFL Defensive Player of the Year by the Associated Press. In addition, Reed set an NFL mark for most interception return yardage in a season, accumulating 358 return yards on nine interceptions; Reed held this record until 2009, when it was exceeded by Darren Sharper. He also returned an interception 106 yards for a touchdown, which was an NFL record until Reed reclaimed the record in 2008.

==== 2005 ====
The Baltimore Ravens promoted defensive line coach Rex Ryan to defensive coordinator after Mike Nolan accepted the head coaching position with the San Francisco 49ers. Ryan opted to retain Reed and Will Demps as the starting safeties for the fourth consecutive season. On October 16, 2005, Reed collected a season-high six combined tackles during a 16–3 win against the Cleveland Browns in Week 6. Reed was inactive for the next six games (Weeks 7–12) due to an ankle injury. He finished the 2005 season with 37 combined tackles (33 solo), nine passes defensed, and an interception in ten games and ten starts.

==== 2006 ====
On June 27, 2006, the Baltimore Ravens signed Reed to a six-year, $40 million contract extension that included a $15 million signing bonus.

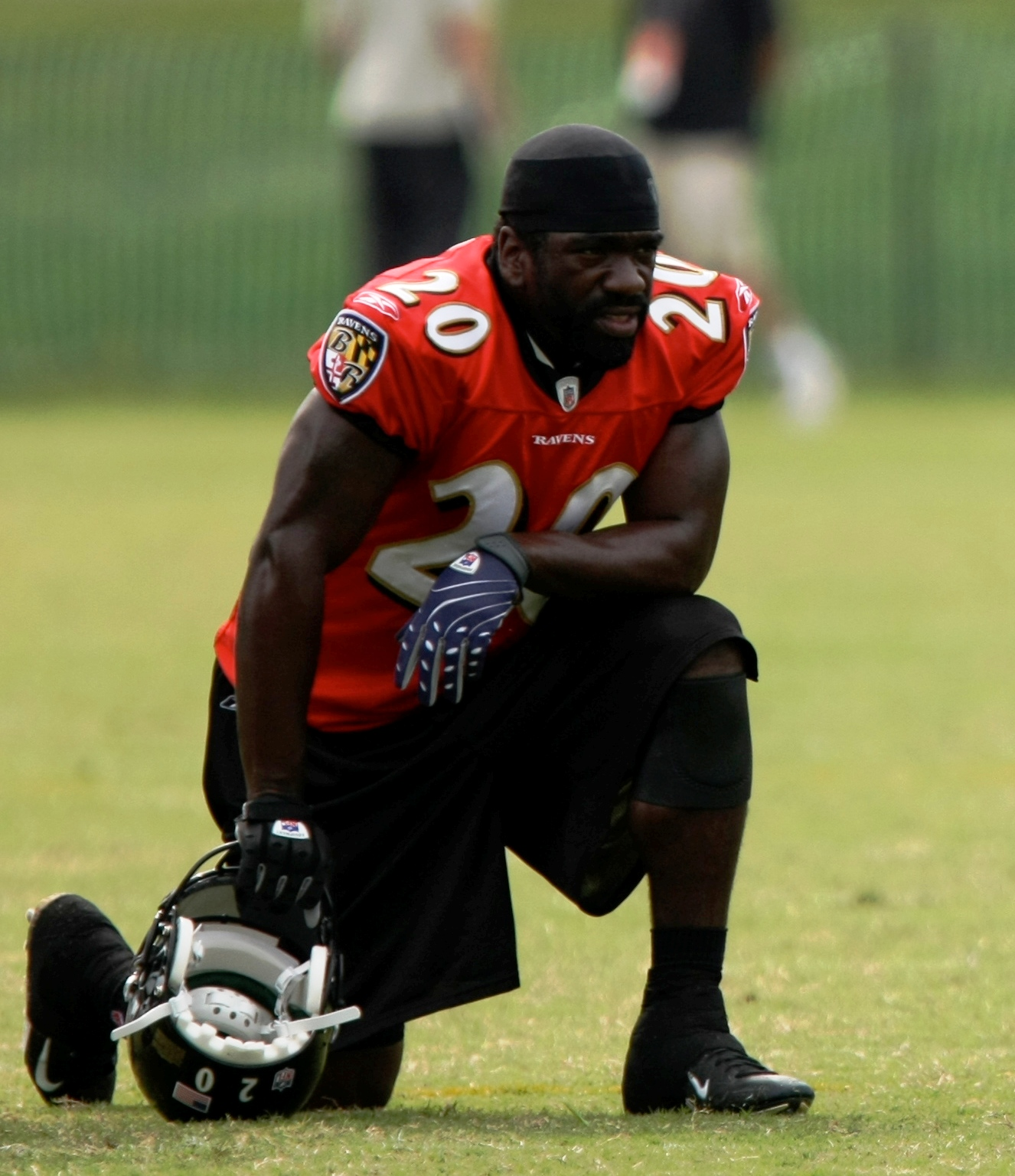
Reed with the Baltimore Ravens, 2008

In Week 4, Reed collected a season-high seven combined tackles, broke up a pass, and recorded his first career safety during a 16–13 win against the San Diego Chargers. On November 5, 2006, Reed made three combined tackles and scored a touchdown in the Ravens' 26–20 victory against the Cincinnati Bengals in Week 9. Reed scored a touchdown after teammate Samari Rolle intercepted a pass by Carson Palmer, that was intended for Chad Johnson, and returned it 24-yards before handing it off to Reed who returned it for the remaining 24-yards for a touchdown. On December 10, 2006, he recorded three combined tackles, made a season-high three pass deflections, and intercepted two passes by Chiefs' quarterback Trent Green during a 20–10 win at the Kansas City Chiefs in Week 14. On December 20, 2006, Reed was named to the 2007 Pro Bowl. He started in all 16 games in 2006 and recorded 59 combined tackles (51 solo), nine pass deflections, five interceptions, a forced fumble, and a touchdown. He was named as a First Team All-Pro for the second time.

The Ravens went 13–3 that season, good enough for the #2 seed and the first round bye in the playoffs. In the Divisional Round against the #3 seeded Indianapolis Colts, Reed had two interceptions off of Peyton Manning along with three pass deflections and a solo tackle. Despite his performance, the Ravens lost 15–6.

==== 2007 ====
Head coach Brian Billick named Reed the starting free safety to begin the regular season in 2007, alongside strong safety Dawan Landry.

He started in the Baltimore Ravens' season-opener at the Cincinnati Bengals and made one tackle, deflected a pass, and had his first career punt return for a touchdown in their 27–20 loss. Reed returned a punt by Kyle Larson in the fourth quarter and returned it, untouched, for a 63-yard touchdown to put the Ravens' ahead 20–19. On October 14, 2007, he recorded three combined tackles, deflected a pass, and made an interception during a 23–3 win against the St. Louis Rams in Week 6. On December 18, 2007, it was announced that Reed was selected to play in the 2008 Pro Bowl. On December 31, 2007, the Baltimore Ravens fired head coach Brian Billick after they finished with a 5–11 record in 2007. He started in all 16 games in 2007 and recorded 39 combined tackles (29 solo), 13 pass deflections, and seven interceptions. Reed served as a backup punt returner in 2007 and finished the season with ten punt returns for 94-yards and one touchdown. He was named as a First Team All-Pro for the third time.

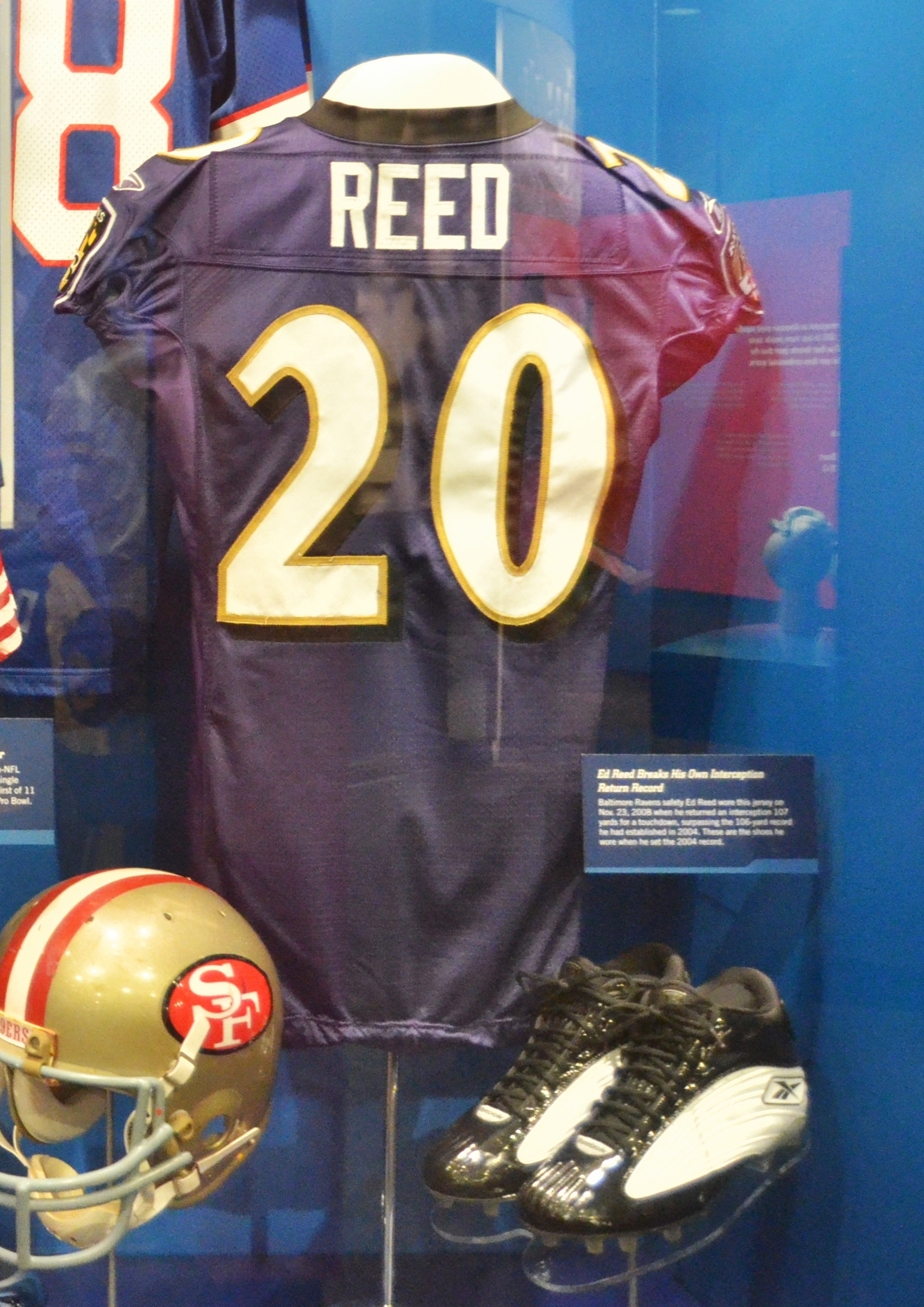
The jersey and cleats worn by Reed during his record setting interception return on display at the Pro Football Hall of Fame.

==== 2008 ====
Head coach John Harbaugh retained Reed and Dawan Landry as the starting safeties in 2008. On September 21, 2008, Reed recorded two combined tackles, broke up two passes, and returned an interception for a 32-yard touchdown during a 28–10 win against the Cleveland Browns in Week 3. In Week 12, Reed made two combined tackles, a season-high four pass deflections, and intercepted two passes during a 36–7 victory against the Philadelphia Eagles to earn AFC Defensive Player of the Week. Reed's first interception of the game came in the first quarter off a pass by Donovan McNabb which led to McNabb's eventually benching. He made a second interception off a pass by quarterback Kevin Kolb and returned it for an NFL record 107-yard touchdown. The previous record was also held by Reed and was a 106-yard interception return for a touchdown in 2004. The ball he intercepted and the jersey he wore during the play are now displayed in the Pro Football Hall of Fame. In Week 14, he earned AFC Defensive Player of the Week for his game against Washington. In Week 15, he collected a season-high eight combined tackles and had a sack on quarterback Ben Roethlisberger during a 13–9 loss to the Pittsburgh Steelers. On December 16, 2008, Reed was announced as a part of the 2009 Pro Bowl roster. The following week, he made one tackle, two pass deflections, and intercepted two passes by quarterback Tony Romo in the Ravens' 33–24 win at the Dallas Cowboys in Week 16. In Week 17, Reed recorded three solo tackles, broke up two passes, and intercepted two pass attempts by David Garrard in Baltimore's 27–7 victory against the Jacksonville Jaguars. His performance marked his fourth game of the season with two interceptions. Reed earned AFC Defensive Player of the Month for December. Reed started all 16 games in 2008 and recorded 41 combined tackles (34 solo), 16 pass deflections, tied his career-high of nine interceptions, two touchdowns, a sack, and a forced fumble. He was named as a First Team All-Pro for the second time.

The Baltimore Ravens finished the 2008 season second in the AFC North with an 11–5 record and earned a playoff berth. On January 4, 2009, Reed had one tackle, broke up two passes, made two interceptions, and returned one for a touchdown during the Ravens' 27–9 win at the Miami Dolphins in the AFC Wild Card Round. Both interceptions came off pass attempts by quarterback Chad Pennington. The Baltimore Ravens reached the AFC Championship, but were defeated by the Pittsburgh Steelers who went on to win Super Bowl XLIII. Reed recorded two solo tackles and deflected a pass as the Ravens lost 23–14.

==== 2009 ====
On January 26, 2009, Baltimore Ravens' head coach John Harbaugh promoted linebackers coach Greg Mattison to defensive coordinator after Rex Ryan accepted the head coaching position with the New York Jets. Mattison opted to retain Reed and Dawan Landry as the starting safety duo in 2009.

In Week 5, Reed recorded a season-high six solo tackles, deflected a pass, and returned an interception for a touchdown during the Ravens' 17–14 loss to the Cincinnati Bengals. Reed intercepted a pass attempt by quarterback Carson Palmer, that was intended for wide receiver Chad Ochocinco, and returned it for a 42-yard touchdown in the second quarter. Reed sustained a groin injury and was inactive for four games (Weeks 13–16). On December 29, 2009, it was announced that Reed was selected to play in the 2010 Pro Bowl. He finished the 2009 season with 50 combined tackles (42 solo), five pass deflections, three interceptions, three forced fumbles, and a touchdown. Reed was the only player unanimously voted onto the AP 2008 NFL All-Pro team. In 2009, Reed was selected to the Sporting News's Team of the Decade (2000s).

The Baltimore Ravens finished second in their division with a 9–7 record, but were eliminated after losing 20–3 at the Indianapolis Colts in the AFC Divisional Round. Reed recorded an interception in each of the Ravens' playoff games. Reed was named to the Pro Football Hall of Fame All-Decade Team for the 2000s.

==== 2010 ====
Reed underwent hip surgery during the offseason and was unable to physically participate in OTA's, training camp, and also missed the entire preseason. On September 4, 2010, the Baltimore Ravens placed Reed on their physically unable to perform list after it was determined that his recovery from hip surgery would take longer than originally expected. Head coach John Harbaugh named Tom Zbikowski during Reed's absence.

On October 24, 2010, Reed made four solo tackles, two pass deflections, forced a fumble, and intercepted two passes by Bills' quarterback Ryan Fitzpatrick during a 37–34 win against the Buffalo Bills in Week 7. In Week 14, he collected a season-high seven combined tackles and broke up a pass in the Ravens' 34–28 win at the Houston Texans. On December 26, 2010, Reed recorded three combined tackles, made two pass deflections, and intercepted two passes by quarterback Colt McCoy during a 20–10 win at the Cleveland Browns in Week 16. The following week, he recorded two combined tackles, made a season-high three pass deflections, and intercepted two passes by Bengals'quarterback Carson Palmer during a 13–7 win against the Cincinnati Bengals. It became his third game of the season with multiple interceptions. He was named AFC Defensive Player of the Week. In addition, he was named AFC Defensive Player of the Month for December. On December 28, 2010, Reed was announced as a 2011 Pro Bowl selection. Reed completed the 2010 season with 37 combined tackles (30 solo), tied his career-high of 16 pass deflections, and led the league with eight interceptions in ten games and ten starts. He was named as a First Team All-Pro. He was ranked fifth by his fellow players on the NFL Top 100 Players of 2011.

==== 2011 ====
On January 18, 2011, the Baltimore Ravens promoted secondary coach Chuck Pagano to defensive coordinator after Greg Mattison accepted the defensive coordinator position at Michigan. Head coach John Harbaugh named Reed the starting free safety to begin the regular season, alongside strong safety Bernard Pollard and cornerbacks Chris Carr and Jimmy Smith. Pollard replaced Dawan Landry who started alongside Reed for the previous five seasons (2006–2010).

Reed started in the Baltimore Ravens' season-opener against the Pittsburgh Steelers and recorded six solo tackles, a season-high four pass deflections, and intercepted two passes by quarterback Ben Roethlisberger in their 35–7 victory. Reed earned his 12th career game with multiple interceptions and surpassed former San Francisco 49ers' safety Ronnie Lott for most multi-interception games in a career. Lott had previously held the record with 11 games with multiple interceptions since 1993. The following week, he collected a season-high eight combined tackles during a 26–13 loss at the Tennessee Titans in Week 2. On December 27, 2011, it was announced that Reed was selected to the 2012 Pro Bowl. Reed started in all 16 games in 2011 and recorded 52 combined tackles (44 solo), eight pass deflections, three interceptions, and a sack.

The Baltimore Ravens finished atop the AFC North with a 12–4 record and clinched a playoff berth. On January 15, 2012, Reed recorded six solo tackles, deflected four passes, and intercepted a pass by quarterback T. J. Yates in the fourth quarter of the Ravens' 20–13 victory against the Houston Texans in the AFC Divisional Round Reed deflected another pass to seal the Ravens' victory, but was injured slightly. The following week, he made four combined tackles and two pass deflections as the Ravens lost 23–20 to the New England Patriots in the AFC Championship Game. He was ranked 16th by his fellow players on the NFL Top 100 Players of 2012.

==== 2012: Super Bowl XLVII champion ====
On January 27, 2012, Baltimore Ravens' head coach John Harbaugh promoted linebackers coach Dean Pees to defensive coordinator after Chuck Pagano accepted the head coaching position with the Indianapolis Colts. Pees retained Reed and Bernard Pollard as the starting safeties in 2012.

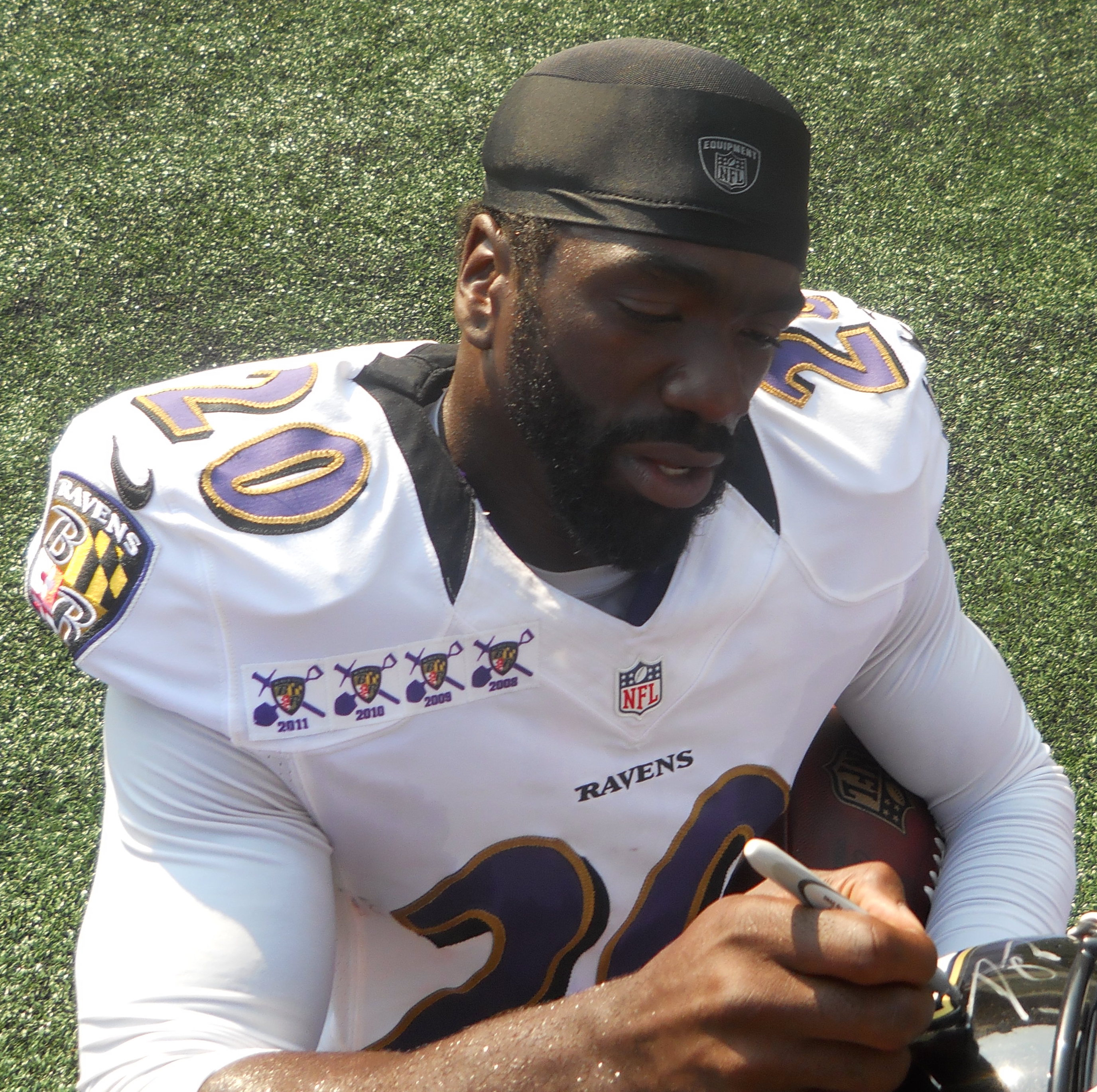
Reed signing a football helmet, 2012

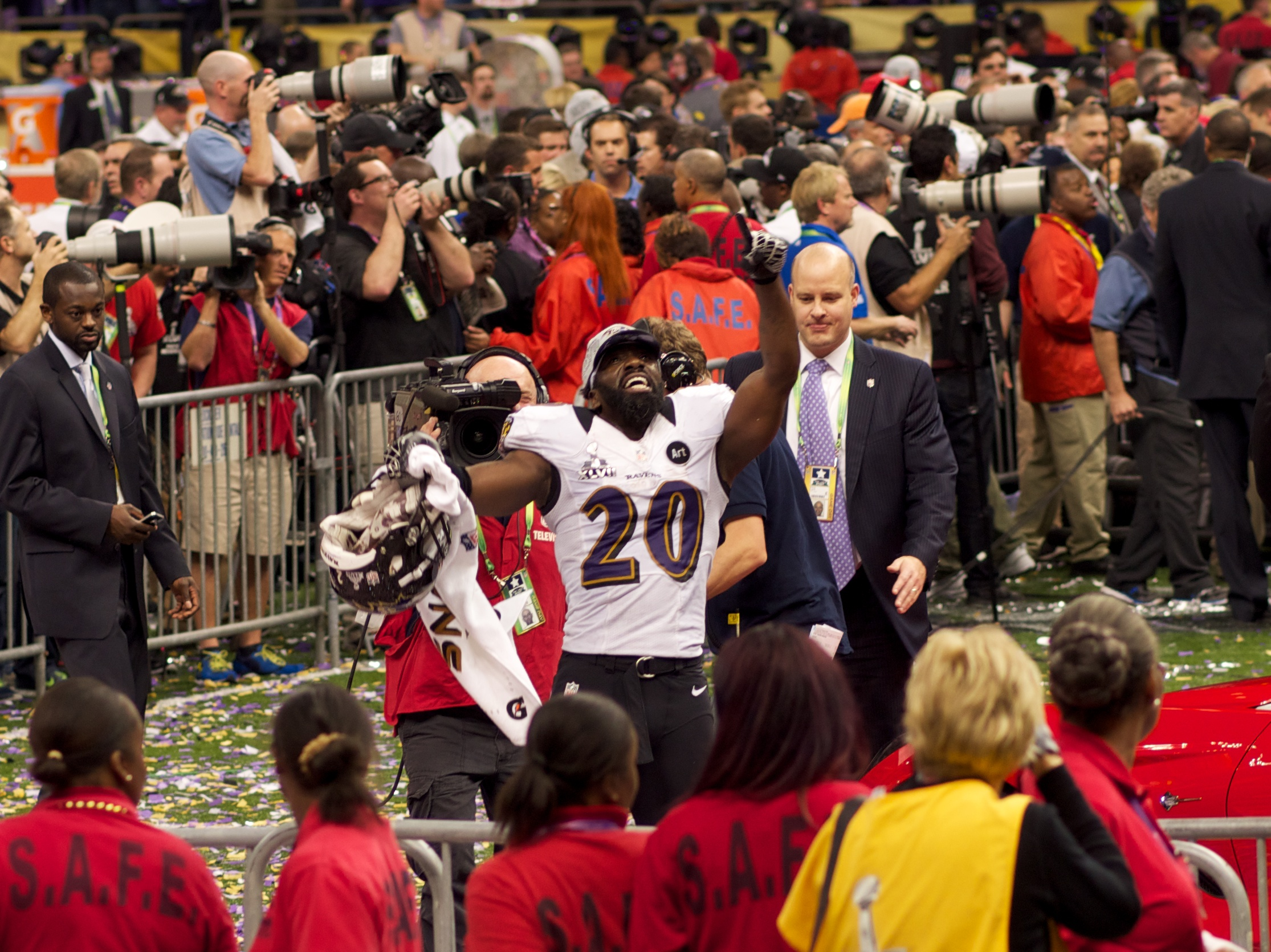
Reed after winning Super Bowl XLVII

Reed skipped out on a mandatory minicamp, but returned for training camp. He started in the Baltimore Ravens' season-opener against the Cincinnati Bengals and made two solo tackles, deflected two passes, and returned an interception by Andy Dalton for a 34-yard touchdown on their 44–13 victory. His 34-yard interception return made him the NFL's all-time leader in career interception return yards. In Week 3, Reed collected a season-high nine combined tackles and broke up two passes during a 31–30 victory against the New England Patriots. On November 19, 2012, Reed was given a one-game suspension by the league "for repeated violations of the rule prohibiting hits to the head and neck area of defenseless players" following an unnecessary roughness call for a hit on wide receiver Emmanuel Sanders. Reed was considered a repeat offender based on his prior hits to wide receiver Deion Branch earlier in the season and to quarterback Drew Brees in 2010. The suspension was later overturned, and Reed was fined $50,000 for the hit. On December 26, 2012, it was announced that Reed was selected to the 2013 Pro Bowl. He started in all 16 games in 2012 and recorded 58 combined tackles (45 solo), 16 pass deflections, four interceptions, and a touchdown.

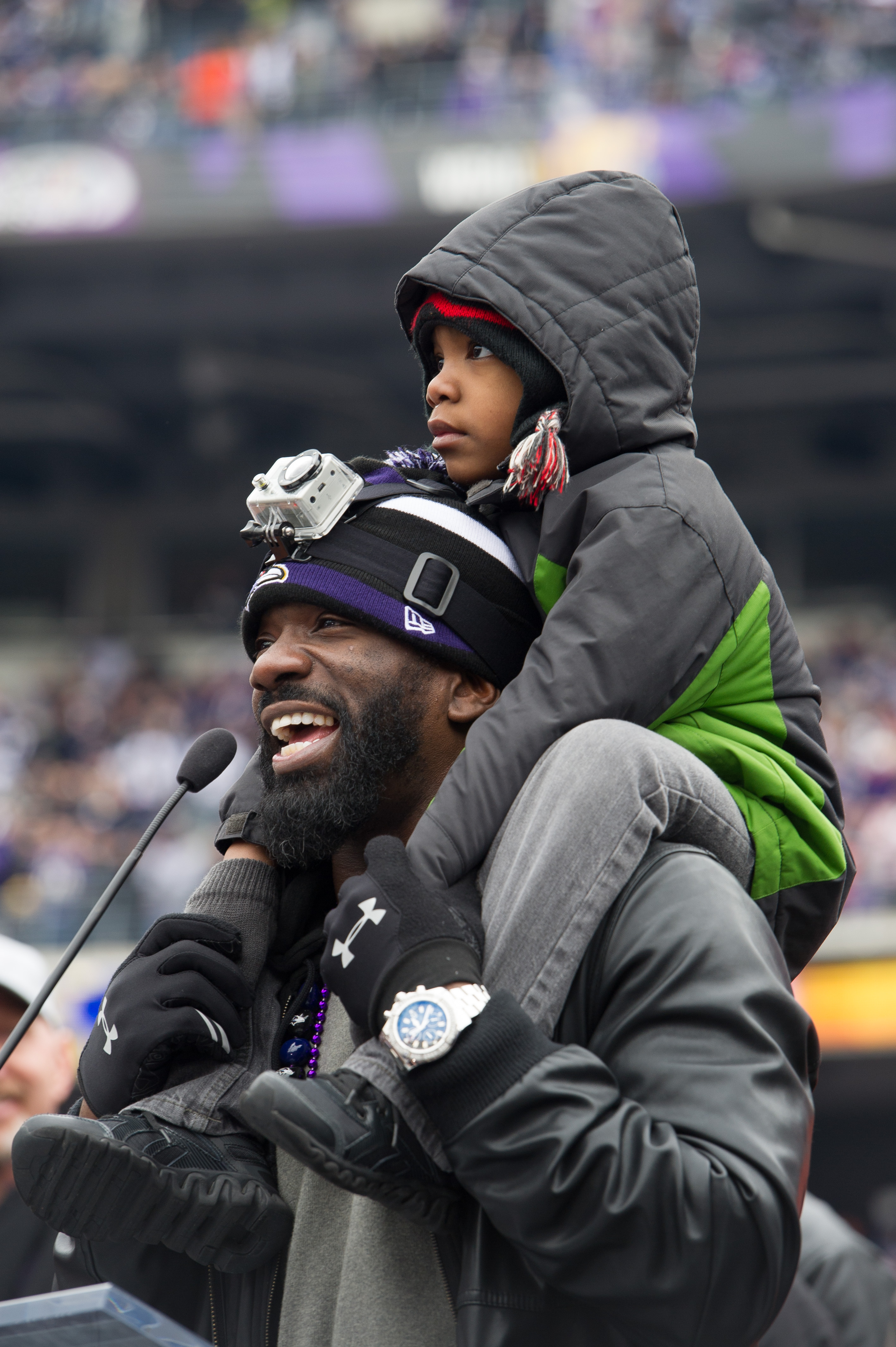
Reed and his son at M&T Bank Stadium following the Ravens Super Bowl XLVII victory

The Baltimore Ravens finished atop the AFC North with a 10–6 record and earned a playoff berth. They reached Super Bowl XLVII after defeating the Indianapolis Colts 24–9 in the AFC Wild Card Round, the Denver Broncos 38–35 in the AFC Divisional Round, and also defeated the New England Patriots 28–13 in the AFC Championship. On February 3, 2013, Reed started in Super Bowl XLVII and recorded five solo tackles, deflected a pass, and intercepted a pass by 49ers' quarterback Colin Kaepernick in the Ravens' 34–31 victory against the San Francisco 49ers. He was ranked 18th by his fellow players on the NFL Top 100 Players of 2013.

==== Departure ====
On January 24, 2013, Reed stated that despite repeated reports he might retire, he intended to play the next year.

Reed became a free agent after his contract expired at the end of the 2012 season. While he had considered retiring after the 2012 season, Reed stated after the Super Bowl that he intended to continue playing football in 2013.

Reed scored a total of 14 touchdowns in his career with the Baltimore Ravens.

=== Houston Texans ===
On March 22, 2013, Reed signed a three-year contract worth $15 million with $5 million guaranteed with the Houston Texans. Later in the 2013 offseason, Reed underwent arthroscopic surgery in his hip to repair a small labral tear. Reed made his Houston Texans debut on September 22, 2013, against the Ravens in Baltimore. As the season progressed, Reed saw his playing time reduced. He eventually lost his starting job to Shiloh Keo during Week 9 against the Indianapolis Colts.

On November 10, 2013, Reed only played 12 snaps in a loss against the Arizona Cardinals. After the game, Reed told the media that the team was "outplayed and outcoached". A few days later, Reed was released by the Texans after displaying limited production with just 16 tackles, no interceptions, no forced fumbles, and no passes defended through seven games.

=== New York Jets ===
Reed was signed by the New York Jets on November 14, 2013, after clearing waivers. The move reunited Reed with head coach Rex Ryan, whom he played for when Ryan was the defensive coordinator of the Baltimore Ravens. Reed played his first game as a Jet on November 17, 2013, against the Buffalo Bills.

In Week 14, he recorded his first interception of the 2013 season against Oakland Raiders quarterback Matt McGloin. In Weeks 16 and 17, against the Cleveland Browns and Miami Dolphins respectively, Reed had an interception late in each game's fourth quarter, to preserve the Jets' win. The interceptions helped the Jets close the season with two straight wins to finish with an 8–8 record, which played a major part in Rex Ryan keeping his job as head coach. With the Jets, Reed played in seven games, of which he started five, with 22 tackles, four passes defended, and three interceptions, which was tied for the team lead. Overall, in 2013, combined with both teams he played for, Reed played 14 games, of which he started 10, with 42 total tackles, four passes defended, and three interceptions.

=== Retirement ===
Reed announced his retirement on May 6, 2015, signing a one-day contract on May 7 to retire as a Baltimore Raven.

Reed was elected to the Pro Football Hall of Fame on February 2, 2019, his first year of eligibility. He was the third homegrown Raven who achieved the sport's highest career recognition. He was named to the NFL 100 All Time Team.

== Career statistics ==
Legend
	NFL Defensive Player of the Year
	Won the Super Bowl
	NFL record
	Led the league
**Bold**	Career high

=== NFL ===
==== Regular season ====
Year	Team	Games		Tackles					Interceptions						Punt returns					Fumbles			Other TD (Note: Touchdowns returned from blocked punts)
Year	Team	GP	GS	Cmb	Solo	Ast	Sck	Sfty	Int	Yds	Avg	Lng	TD	PD	Ret	Yds	Avg	Lng	TD	FF	FR	TD	Other TD
2002	BAL	16	16	**85**	**71**	**14**	1.0	0	5	167	33.4	59	0	7	—	—	—	—	—	0	0	0	1
2003	BAL	16	15	71	59	12	1.0	0	7	132	18.9	54T	1	9	5	33	6.6	19	0	0	1	0	**2**
2004	BAL	16	16	76	62	**14**	**2.0**	0	**9**	**358**	**39.8**	106T	1	8	—	—	—	—	—	2	**3**	**1**	0
2005	BAL	10	10	37	33	4	0.0	0	1	23	23.0	23	0	8	—	—	—	—	—	0	0	0	0
2006	BAL	16	16	59	51	8	0.0	**1**	5	70	14.0	37	1	4	—	—	—	—	—	1	1	0	0
2007	BAL	16	16	39	29	10	0.0	0	7	130	18.6	32	0	13	**10**	**94**	9.4	**63T**	**1**	1	0	0	0
2008	BAL	16	16	41	34	7	1.0	0	**9**	264	29.3	**107T**	**2**	**16**	1	8	8.0	8	0	2	1	**1**	0
2009	BAL	12	12	50	42	8	0.0	0	3	111	37.0	52T	1	5	7	29	4.1	9	0	**3**	**3**	0	0
2010	BAL	10	10	37	30	7	0.0	0	8	183	22.9	44	0	**16**	3	11	3.7	9	0	1	1	0	0
2011	BAL	16	16	52	44	8	1.0	0	3	25	8.3	16	0	8	3	29	**9.7**	16	0	0	1	0	0
2012	BAL	16	16	58	49	9	0.0	0	4	78	19.5	34T	1	15	1	1	1.0	1	0	**3**	0	0	0
2013	HOU	7	5	16	14	2	0.0	0	0	0	0.0	0	0	0	—	—	—	—	—	0	0	0	0
2013	NYJ	7	5	22	13	9	0.0	0	3	49	16.3	25	0	4	—	—	—	—	—	0	0	0	0
Career		174	169	643	531	112	6.0	1	64	1,590	24.8	107T	7	113	30	205	6.8	63	1	13	11	2	3

==== Postseason ====
Year	Team	Games		Tackles					Interceptions						Punt returns					Fumbles		
Year	Team	GP	GS	Cmb	Solo	Ast	Sck	Sfty	Int	Yds	Avg	Lng	TD	PD	Ret	Yds	Avg	Lng	TD	FF	FR	TD
2003	BAL	1	1	0	0	0	0.0	0	1	23	23.0	23	0	2	—	—	—	—	—	0	0	0
2006	BAL	1	1	1	1	0	0.0	0	**2**	0	0.0	0	0	3	—	—	—	—	—	0	0	0
2008	BAL	3	3	7	6	1	0.0	0	**2**	**76**	**38.0**	**64**	**1**	3	—	—	—	—	—	0	0	0
2009	BAL	2	2	9	7	**2**	0.0	0	**2**	38	19.0	38	0	2	—	—	—	—	—	0	0	0
2010	BAL	2	2	7	6	1	0.0	0	0	0	0.0	0	0	0	—	—	—	—	—	**1**	0	0
2011	BAL	2	2	10	9	1	0.0	0	1	0	0.0	0	0	**6**	—	—	—	—	—	0	0	0
2012	BAL	4	4	**15**	**14**	1	0.0	0	1	6	6.0	6	0	3	**1**	0	0.0	0	0	0	0	0
Career		15	15	49	43	6	0.0	0	9	168	18.6	64	1	19	1	0	0.0	0	0	1	0	0

=== College ===
Season	Team	GP	Tackles				Interceptions					Punt returns				Kick returns				Fumbles	
Season	Team	GP	Cmb	Solo	Ast	TFL	Int	Yds	Avg	TD	PD	Ret	Yds	Avg	TD	Ret	Yds	Avg	TD	FF	FR
1997	Miami	Redshirt																			
1998	Miami	11	**90**	**61**	**29**	2.0	2	53	**26.5**	0	7	**6**	40	6.7	0	1	10	10.0	0	**4**	1
1999	Miami	12	74	48	26	**4.0**	2	38	19.0	0	4	2	29	**14.5**	0	**2**	**43**	**21.5**	0	0	1
2000	Miami	11	80	59	21	0.0	8	92	11.5	**2**	**23**	–	–	–	–	–	–	–	–	0	0
2001	Miami	11	44	35	9	1.0	**9**	**206**	22.9	**2**	18	4	**54**	13.5	0	–	–	–	–	0	**2**
Total		45	288	203	85	7.0	21	389	18.5	4	52	12	123	10.3	0	3	53	17.7	0	4	4

== Career highlights ==
=== Awards and honors ===
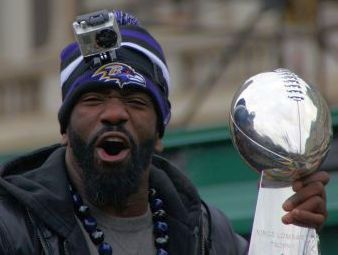
Reed with the Vince Lombardi Trophy at the Ravens Super Bowl parade.

NFL

- Super Bowl champion (XLVII)
- NFL Defensive Player of the Year (2004)
- PFWA NFL Defensive Player of the Year (2004)
- AFC Defensive Player of the Year (2004)
- NFL Alumni Defensive Back of the Year (2008)
- 5× First-team All-Pro (2004, 2006–2008, 2010)
- 3× Second-team All-Pro (2003, 2009, 2011)
- 9× Pro Bowl (2003, 2004, 2006–2012)
- 3× NFL interceptions leader (2004, 2008, 2010)
- NFL 2000s All-Decade Team
- NFL 100th Anniversary All-Time Team
- No. 88 on The Top 100: NFL's Greatest Players
- PFWA All-Rookie Team (2002)
- 3× NFL Top 100 — 5th (2011), 16th (2012), 18th (2013)
- Baltimore Ravens Ring of Honor
- Baltimore Ravens No. 20 has not been issued since his retirement

College

- BCS national champion (2001)
- New York Times national champion (2000)
- 2× Big East champions (2000, 2001)
- Rose Bowl champion (2001)
- Sugar Bowl champion (2000)
- Gator Bowl champion (1999)
- MicronPC Bowl champion (1998)
- The Football News National Defensive Player of the Year (2001)
- Co-Big East Defensive Player of the Year (2001)
- Unanimous All-American (2001)
- Consensus All-American (2000)
- The Sporting News Freshman All-America Team (1998)
- The Football News Freshman All-America Team (1998)
- NCAA interceptions leader (2001)
- 2× Big East interceptions leader (2000, 2001)
- 2× First-team All-Big East (2000, 2001 unanimous)
- Second-team All-Big East (1999)
- First-team AP All-Time All-American
- Miami Hurricanes Ring of Honor (2017)

Halls of fame

- University of Miami Sports Hall of Fame – Class of 2012
- Louisiana Sports Hall of Fame – Class of 2017
- College Football Hall of Fame – Class of 2018
- Pro Football Hall of Fame – Class of 2019
- Sugar Bowl New Orleans Sports Hall of Fame – Class of 2019
- Florida Sports Hall of Fame – Class of 2021
- Louisiana High School Sports Hall of Fame – Class of 2021

Track and field

Big East Outdoor Championships

- (gold) Javelin throw (1999)
- (bronze) Javelin throw (2000)

=== Records ===
==== NFL records ====
- Tied-most playoff career interceptions (9)
- Longest interception return (107 yards) *Touchdown
- Most interception return yards, career (1,590 yards)
- Tied-most career blocked punts returned for touchdowns (3)
- Only player in NFL history to score touchdowns via interception, fumble recovery, blocked punt & punt return.
- Most multi-interception games, career (12)

==== Ravens franchise records ====
- Most career interceptions (61)
- Most career interception return yards (1,541)
- Most career interception return touchdowns (7)
- Most passes defended (137)
- Most interception-return yards in a single game (150)

== Coaching career ==
On January 13, 2016, Reed was hired as an assistant defensive backs coach for the Buffalo Bills. This reunited him with coach Rex Ryan for the third time, after stints together with the Ravens and Jets during Reed's playing career. After serving the 2016 season in Buffalo, Reed was not retained by new coach Sean McDermott after Ryan's dismissal.

On December 27, 2022, Reed was hired as the new head coach of the Bethune–Cookman Wildcats football team. Before he officially became the coach of the team, Bethune–Cookman declined to ratify the contract on January 21, 2023, which vacated the football team's head coaching position. Prior to his dismissal, Reed recorded a live stream on which he vociferously criticized the condition of the school's athletic facilities. In the wake of this decision, Reed continued his criticism of the university, saying "I'm not withdrawing my name as they say. They don't want me here. They do not want me because I tell the truth."

On January 13, 2025, Reed was announced as the offensive coordinator of Chamblee High School in Chamblee, Georgia, near Atlanta.

== Administrative career ==
On January 30, 2020, Reed was hired by the University of Miami as the football team's chief of staff, an advisory role to head coach Manny Diaz. Following the departure of Diaz, Reed stayed in his role under new head coach Mario Cristobal.

== Personal life ==
Reed is a member of Kappa Alpha Psi fraternity. He was initiated on November 16, 2024 through the Grambling Alumni Chapter.
