= Chris Redman =

American football player and coach (born 1977)

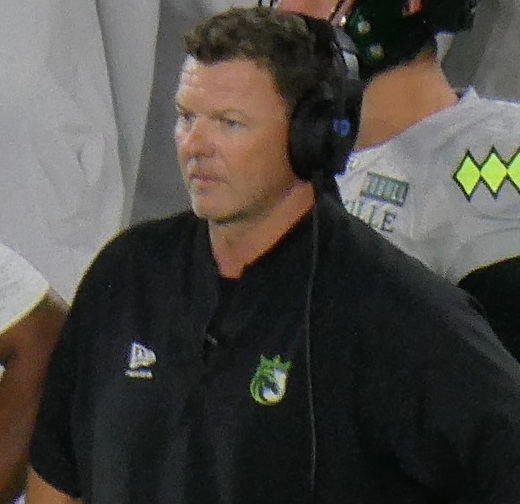
- Redman with the Louisville Kings in 2026

Louisville Kings
- Title: Head coach

Personal information
- Born: July 7, 1977 (age 49); Louisville, Kentucky, U.S.
- Listed height: 6 ft 3 in (1.91 m)
- Listed weight: 225 lb (102 kg)

Career information
- Position: Quarterback (No. 7, 8)
- High school: Louisville Male
- College: Louisville (1995–1999)
- NFL draft: 2000: 3rd round, 75th overall pick

Career history

Playing
- Baltimore Ravens (2000–2003); New England Patriots (2005)*; Tennessee Titans (2005)*; Austin Wranglers (2007)*; Atlanta Falcons (2007–2011)
- * Offseason or practice squad member only

Coaching
- Louisville Kings (2026–present) Head coach

Operations
- Louisville Xtreme (2021) President

Awards and highlights
- Super Bowl champion (XXXV); UFL champion (2026); Johnny Unitas Golden Arm Award (1999); C-USA Offensive Player of the Year (1999); First-team All-CUSA (1999); Second-team All-CUSA (1998); Louisville Cardinals Ring of Honor

Career NFL statistics
- Passing attempts: 500
- Passing completions: 286
- Completion percentage: 57.2%
- TD–INT: 21–14
- Passing yards: 3,179
- Passer rating: 78.6
- Stats at Pro Football Reference

Head coaching record
- Regular season: 6–4 (.600)
- Postseason: 2–0 (1.000)
- Career: 8–4 (.667)

Chris James Redman (born July 7, 1977) is an American football coach and former quarterback who is the current head coach of the Louisville Kings of the United Football League (UFL). He played for nine seasons in the National Football League (NFL). He played college football for the Louisville Cardinals and was selected by the Baltimore Ravens in the third round of the 2000 NFL draft. Redman spent four seasons with the Ravens, primarily serving as a backup, and was part of the team that won a Super Bowl title in Super Bowl XXXV. After four years away from the NFL, he returned in 2007 with the Atlanta Falcons, where he played his last five seasons.

== Early life ==
Redman played high school football at Louisville Male High School, where his father, Bob Redman, was the veteran head coach. He helped lead the Bulldogs to the Kentucky Class 4A 1993 state championship (Kentucky's largest class at the time). He was a two-time All-State quarterback and Parade's National Player of the Year in 1994 after setting national high school records for most touchdown passes in a season (57) and most touchdown passes in a half (8, twice).

=== Recruitment ===
As a top blue chip recruit, Redman was sought after by many top college football programs. In-state Louisville was Redman's first choice, giving a verbal commitment in 1994. That changed when coach Howard Schnellenberger left to take the head coaching job at Oklahoma, taking offensive coordinator Gary Nord along with him. Schnellenberger did not recruit Redman further out of respect to his former employer, although Redman himself would back out of his commitment.

Redman then turned his attention to Illinois, giving them a commitment based on the recruiting efforts of Illini offensive coordinator Greg Landry. Illini head coach Lou Tepper ignited a controversy when he unexpectedly fired Landry the day after Redman signed his letter of commitment. Tepper denied any attempt to deceive Redman about Landry's future at Illinois and eventually released Redman from his commitment. The losses of Landry and Redman damaged Tepper's reputation among fans and media. The NCAA decided to void the LOC based on the unusual circumstances, restoring Redman to full eligibility and without transfer restrictions.

In the spring of 1995, Redman visited Tennessee and Auburn before deciding to follow Schnellenberger to Oklahoma, giving another verbal commitment. That commitment lasted only a few months, as Redman backed out based on concerns about the depth chart and distance from home. In the summer of 1995, Redman signed a letter of intent to play college football at Louisville, his original choice, under new head coach Ron Cooper.

== College career ==
Redman completed his college career as the NCAA Division I-A career leader in passing completions (1,031) and attempts (1,679). His 12,541 career passing yards ranked third behind Brigham Young's Ty Detmer (15,031 yards) and Louisiana Tech's Tim Rattay (12,746). Redman threw 84 touchdown passes and 51 interceptions and still holds numerous single game, single season, and career passing records at the University of Louisville.

Redman played in 10 games as a redshirt freshman in 1996, starting the final five, and earned Conference USA All-Freshman honors after he threw for more than 1,700 yards. In his first legitimate college action, coming off the bench to replace injured starter Jason Payne, Redman amassed 325 yards and three touchdowns in Louisville's come-from-behind win at Michigan State.

As a sophomore in 1997, Redman started all 11 games and shattered single-season school passing marks in attempts (445), completions (261), yards (3,079) and total offense (2,958). Louisville struggled to a 1–10 record and head coach Ron Cooper was fired.

In 1998, under the guidance of new offensive coordinator Bobby Petrino and new head coach John L. Smith, Redman started 10 of 11 regular-season games as a junior and established Conference USA and Louisville season records for attempts (473), completions (309), yards (4,042) and touchdowns (29) despite missing a game because of a knee injury. His 404.2 yards-per-game average was the fifth highest in Division I-A history. On November 14, 1998, Redman torched East Carolina by completing 44 of 56 passes (with six touchdown passes) for 592 yards—the 10th-best single-game yardage total of all time. The Cardinals had a huge turnaround from the season before, going 7–4 in the regular season and participating in a bowl game for the first time since 1993.

As a senior in 1999, Redman started every game and completed 317 of 489 passes for 3,647 yards with 29 touchdowns and 13 interceptions. He became the first quarterback in Division I-A history to complete more than 1,000 passes in a career, and he matched the I-A record for most seasons (three) with at least 3,000 passing yards. Redman received the Johnny Unitas Golden Arm Award (named for the former University of Louisville and Baltimore Colts star), which is presented each year to the nation's top senior quarterback. Redman was the Conference USA Offensive Player of the Year, guiding Louisville to seven come-from-behind wins and helping the Cardinals make their second consecutive bowl appearance.

== Professional career ==
Pre-draft measurables
Height	Weight	Arm length	Hand span	40-yard dash	10-yard split	20-yard split	20-yard shuttle	Three-cone drill	Vertical jump	Broad jump	Wonderlic
6 ft 2 3/4 in (1.90 m)	222 lb (101 kg)	31 in (0.79 m)	9 3/4 in (0.25 m)	5.32 s	1.82 s	3.07 s	4.78 s	7.80 s	26.5 in (0.67 m)	8 ft 2 in (2.49 m)	16
All values from NFL Combine

=== Baltimore Ravens ===
Redman's professional career began when he was selected in the third round (75th overall) of the 2000 NFL draft by the Baltimore Ravens. He was the third quarterback taken and one of the six drafted ahead of Tom Brady. Redman threw just 19 yards that year as he backed up Tony Banks and Trent Dilfer. Redman earned a Super Bowl ring that year when the Ravens won Super Bowl XXXV. In 2001, despite Banks and Dilfer both leaving, Redman did not play at all that year as veterans Elvis Grbac and Randall Cunningham took the snaps.

On October 6, 2002, Redman had arguably his best outing as a pro, completing 19 of 30 passes for 208 yards and two touchdowns with no interceptions in a 26–21 victory at division-rival Cleveland.

Redman served as Baltimore's backup in 2003 after recovering from back surgery. In a November 9, 2003, nationally televised game at St. Louis, Redman replaced injured starter Kyle Boller during the game and was injured himself, suffering a torn labrum in his right (throwing) shoulder. The season-ending injury was not diagnosed until after the game.

=== New England Patriots ===
After recovering from shoulder surgery in 2004, Redman was signed to play with the New England Patriots on January 6, 2005, but he was waived on June 1. Incidentally, had he made the team, he would have backed up Tom Brady, who was taken three rounds later in the same draft.

=== Tennessee Titans ===
He was then signed by the Tennessee Titans on August 23, 2005, but was waived on September 4.

=== Austin Wranglers ===
On January 4, 2007, the Austin Wranglers of the Arena Football League announced that they had signed Redman to a contract. However, shortly into his arena football career, Bobby Petrino, the Atlanta Falcons new head coach, sought after his former college quarterback to be a backup.

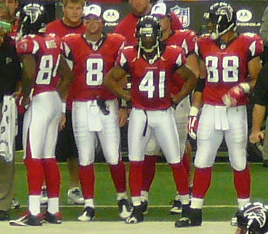
Redman (8) with the Atlanta Falcons in 2009

=== Atlanta Falcons ===
Redman was signed by the Falcons on March 23, 2007, after Atlanta traded backup quarterback Matt Schaub to the Houston Texans in exchange for two second-round picks and an agreement to switch first-round picks for the 2007 NFL draft. Redman began fall practice as the third-string quarterback but moved to No. 2 on the depth chart before Atlanta's first preseason game. His backup role was solidified when D. J. Shockley suffered a season-ending knee injury in the Falcons' first preseason game.

On September 18, 2007, Redman was moved to No. 3 on the depth chart after the Falcons signed former Jacksonville Jaguars quarterback Byron Leftwich. With Leftwich battling a leg injury throughout the season and Harrington playing inconsistently, Coach Bobby Petrino kept rotating both Leftwich and Harrington into the starters role.

In Week 12 on December 2, 2007, Redman replaced an ineffective Joey Harrington against the St. Louis Rams and completed 16 of 24 passes for 172 yards with two touchdowns and one interception, all in the fourth quarter, nearly bringing Atlanta back from a 21–3 deficit. He was named the starter on December 6, and in his first start in five years completed 23 of 40 passes for a career-high 298 yards with two touchdowns and one interception in a Monday Night Football loss to the New Orleans Saints on December 10. Redman had a disastrous Week 14, going 4 of 15 for 34 yards with two interceptions and a lost fumble against Tampa Bay, and had been the last QB to have a 0 passer rating for that game until Peyton Manning did it in 2015. He rebounded in his third start for the Falcons by completing 28 of 42 for a career-high 315 yards with two touchdowns and one interception in an overtime loss to Arizona. In the season finale, Redman completed 17 of 27 passes for 251 yards with a career-high four touchdowns in the Falcons' 44–41 victory over the Seattle Seahawks on December 30, winning his first NFC Offensive Player of the Week award. While playing in six games, four of them being starts, Redman had career highs in completion percentage (59.7), passing yards (1,079), touchdowns (10) and passer rating (90.4).

Following the 2007 season, Atlanta signed Redman to a two-year deal.

In Week 12 of the 2009 season, filling in for the injured Matt Ryan and playing for the first time since December 30, 2007, Redman led the Falcons to a dramatic comeback win against the struggling Tampa Bay Buccaneers. In the final seconds he threw a pass to Roddy White for the go-ahead touchdown on 4th and goal. Despite shaking off some rust, he was 23 of 41 for 243 yards with two touchdowns and no interceptions. As the starter for Ryan in Week 13 against the Philadelphia Eagles, Redman was 23 of 44 for 235 yards with one touchdown and two picks, one returned for a touchdown by the Eagles. In a second consecutive start filling in for Ryan against the undefeated Saints, Redman was much sharper, completing 23 of 34 passes for 303 yards with one touchdown (a 50-yard post pattern to Michael Jenkins) and one interception in a 26–23 loss.

Following the 2009 season, Redman signed a two-year extension worth $5.6 million.

On August 28, 2012, the Falcons released Redman.

== Career statistics ==
Legend
**Bold**	Career high

=== NFL ===
Year	Team	Games			Passing									Rushing					Sacks	
Year	Team	GP	GS	Record	Cmp	Att	Pct	Yds	Y/A	Lng	TD	Int	Rtg	Att	Yds	Avg	Lng	TD	Sck	Yds
2000	BAL	2	0	—	2	3	**66.7**	19	6.3	12	0	0	84.0	1	0	0.0	0	0	0	0
2001	BAL	0	0	—	DNP															
2002	BAL	6	6	**3–3**	**97**	**182**	53.3	1,034	5.7	36	7	3	76.1	**10**	8	0.8	6	0	**11**	**68**
2003	BAL	2	0	—	7	13	53.8	58	4.5	16	0	2	26.0	2	4	**2.0**	4	0	6	45
2007	ATL	7	4	1–3	89	149	59.7	**1,079**	**7.2**	**74**	**10**	**5**	**90.4**	8	**16**	**2.0**	**7**	0	9	51
2008	ATL	0	0	—	DNP															
2009	ATL	6	2	0–2	69	119	58.0	781	6.6	50	4	3	78.4	6	4	0.7	5	0	8	34
2010	ATL	2	0	—	4	6	**66.7**	20	3.3	14	0	0	71.5	1	–1	–1.0	–1	0	0	0
2011	ATL	5	0	—	18	28	64.3	188	6.7	22	0	1	68.7	5	–6	–1.2	–1	0	0	0
Career		30	12	4–8	286	500	57.2	3,179	6.4	74	21	14	78.6	33	25	0.8	7	0	34	198

=== College ===
Season	Team	Games (Note: Redman's statistics from his bowl game appearances are excluded, as bowl game statistics were not officially counted toward season or career totals prior to 2002.)			Passing								Rushing			
Season	Team	GP	GS	Record	Cmp	Att	Pct	Yds	Y/A	TD	Int	Rtg	Att	Yds	Avg	TD
1995	Louisville	0	0	—	Redshirted (redshirt)											
1996	Louisville	10	6	2–4	144	272	52.9	1,773	6.5	8	9	110.8	37	**–148**	**–4.0**	0
1997	Louisville	11	11	1–10	261	445	58.7	3,079	6.9	18	14	123.8	**47**	–121	–2.6	0
1998	Louisville	11	11	6–5	309	473	**65.3**	**4,042**	**8.5**	**29**	**15**	**151.0**	40	–33	–0.8	**2**
1999	Louisville	12	12	**7–5**	**317**	**489**	64.8	3,647	7.5	**29**	13	141.7	43	–110	–2.6	1
Career		44	40	16–24	1,031	1,679	61.4	12,541	7.5	84	51	134.6	167	–412	–2.5	3

== Coaching/administration career ==
In 2020, Redman was named a part owner and team President of the indoor football team Louisville Xtreme, and switched the team affiliation to the Indoor Football League. After several games played in the 2021 season, the Xtreme were kicked out of the league for not meeting minimum league obligations. Redman revealed to the press that he had quietly abandoned the team several weeks prior. The team folded thereafter.

Redman served as an assistant/QB coach at Arlington/Midlothian High School in Texas from 2023 to 2024.

On December 30, 2025, he was named the head coach for the Louisville Kings of the United Football League (UFL). He is one of five members of the Super Bowl XXXV Champion Ravens on the ballclub's coaching staff along with Jamie Sharper, Chris McAlister, Brad Jackson and Tony Banks.

=== Head coaching record ===
Team	Year	Regular season					Postseason			
Team	Year	Won	Lost	Ties	Win %	Finish	Won	Lost	Win %	Result
LOU	2026	6	4	0	.600	3rd in UFL	2	0	1.000	United Bowl champions
Total		6	4	0	.600		2	0	1.000	

== See also ==
- List of Division I FBS passing yardage leaders
