= Jamie Sharper =

American football player (born 1974)

Louisville Kings
- Title: Defensive coordinator

Personal information
- Born: November 23, 1974 (age 51); Richmond, Virginia, U.S.
- Listed height: 6 ft 3 in (1.91 m)
- Listed weight: 239 lb (108 kg)

Career information
- Position: Linebacker (No. 55)
- High school: Hermitage (Henrico, Virginia)
- College: Virginia (1992–1996)
- NFL draft: 1997: 2nd round, 34th overall pick
- Expansion draft: 2002: 1st round, 5th overall pick

Career history

Playing
- Baltimore Ravens (1997–2001); Houston Texans (2002–2004); Seattle Seahawks (2005)

Coaching
- St. Augustine High School (LA) (2016–2017) Linebackers coach; Georgetown (2018–2020) Assistant linebackers coach; Georgetown (2021–2022) Defensive line coach; DC Defenders (2023–2025) Linebackers coach & special teams coach; Louisville Kings (2026–present) Defensive coordinator

Awards and highlights
- Super Bowl champion (XXXV); 2x UFL champion (2025, 2026); NFL combined tackles leader (2003); First-team All-ACC (1996); Second-team All-ACC (1994)

Career NFL statistics
- Tackles: 879
- Sacks: 25.5
- Forced fumbles: 13
- Fumble recoveries: 7
- Interceptions: 2
- Defensive touchdowns: 2
- Stats at Pro Football Reference

Harry James Sharper Jr. (born November 23, 1974) is an American football coach and former player who is the defensive coordinator for the Louisville Kings of the United Football League (UFL). Sharper played professionally as a linebacker for nine seasons in the National Football League (NFL), and played college football for the Virginia Cavaliers. He was selected by the Baltimore Ravens in the second round of the 1997 NFL draft. Sharper spent five seasons in Baltimore, where he was part of the team that won the franchise's first Super Bowl in Super Bowl XXXV. In 2002, he was selected by the Houston Texans in their expansion draft and played three seasons with the team. During his final season in 2005, Sharper was a member of the Seattle Seahawks. He is the older brother of former safety Darren Sharper.

== Career ==
Sharper attended Hermitage High School in Henrico County, Virginia. He played for the school's American football team as a linebacker. His younger brother, Darren, played for the football team as a quarterback. After high school, Sharper enrolled at the University of Virginia, and played college football for the Virginia Cavaliers.

Pre-draft measurables
| Height | Weight | Arm length | Hand span | 40-yard dash | 10-yard split | 20-yard split | 20-yard shuttle | Three-cone drill | Vertical jump | Broad jump | Bench press |
|---|---|---|---|---|---|---|---|---|---|---|---|
| 6 ft 2 7/8 in (1.90 m) | 240 lb (109 kg) | 32 7/8 in (0.84 m) | 9 1/4 in (0.23 m) | 4.67 s | 1.61 s | 2.74 s | 4.24 s | 7.57 s | 36.5 in (0.93 m) | 9 ft 8 in (2.95 m) | 19 reps |
All values from NFL Combine

The Baltimore Ravens selected Sharper with the 34th overall pick in the 1997 NFL draft. He made an impact right away, recording 68 tackles, three sacks and one interception in his rookie year. He became an important part in the record-setting 2000 Ravens defense, making a crucial interception which sent Baltimore to the Super Bowl, and he started in Super Bowl XXXV. His career totals with the Ravens included 328 tackles, 14 sacks, 2 interceptions and one touchdown. After the 2001 season he was chosen in the expansion draft by the Houston Texans. From 2003-2004, while a member of the Texans, he led the NFL in tackles in that period with 301. After the 2004 season he signed with the Seattle Seahawks for one season, helping the team reach their first Super Bowl. Sharper then retired after one season with Seattle due to a knee injury. During his 9-year career Sharper only missed 8 games, and did not miss a game until his final season, playing in 136 straight games.

=== Post-playing career ===
Jamie Sharper joined the coaching staff at St. Augustine High School in New Orleans and served as linebackers coach from 2016 to 2018. He joined the Georgetown University football program in August 2018 as the assistant linebackers coach and held that position until 2021. From 2021 to 2022, he served as the defensive line coach.

Sharper was hired by the DC Defenders on September 13, 2022. He did not return in 2024. He has been the defensive coordinator with the Louisville Kings since the 2026 season. He is one of five members of the Super Bowl XXXV Champion Ravens on the ballclub's coaching staff along with Chris Redman, Chris McAlister, Brad Jackson and Tony Banks.

== NFL career statistics ==
Legend
| | Won the Super Bowl |
| | Led the league |
| **Bold** | Career high |

=== Regular season ===
| Year | Team | Games | | Tackles | | | | Interceptions | | | | Fumbles | | | |
| Year | Team | GP | GS | Comb | Solo | Ast | Sck | Int | Yds | TD | Lng | FF | FR | Yds | TD |
|---|---|---|---|---|---|---|---|---|---|---|---|---|---|---|---|
| 1997 | BAL | 16 | 15 | 66 | 52 | 14 | 3.0 | **1** | 4 | 0 | 4 | 1 | 0 | 0 | 0 |
| 1998 | BAL | 16 | 16 | 54 | 45 | 9 | 1.0 | 0 | 0 | 0 | 0 | 0 | 0 | 0 | 0 |
| 1999 | BAL | 16 | 16 | 96 | 78 | 18 | 4.0 | 0 | 0 | 0 | 0 | 0 | 0 | 0 | 0 |
| 2000 | BAL | 16 | 16 | 76 | 63 | 13 | 0.0 | **1** | **45** | 0 | **45** | **5** | 2 | 0 | 0 |
| 2001 | BAL | 16 | 16 | 108 | 77 | 31 | **6.0** | 0 | 0 | 0 | 0 | 0 | 1 | 8 | **1** |
| 2002 | HOU | 16 | 16 | 137 | 95 | 42 | 5.5 | 0 | 0 | 0 | 0 | 0 | **3** | 2 | 0 |
| 2003 | HOU | 16 | 16 | **166** | **107** | **59** | 4.0 | 0 | 0 | 0 | 0 | 3 | 0 | 0 | 0 |
| 2004 | HOU | 16 | 16 | 139 | 98 | 41 | 2.0 | 0 | 0 | 0 | 0 | 3 | 1 | **16** | **1** |
| 2005 | SEA | 8 | 8 | 37 | 29 | 8 | 0.0 | 0 | 0 | 0 | 0 | 1 | 0 | 0 | 0 |
| Career | | 136 | 135 | 879 | 644 | 235 | 25.5 | 2 | 49 | 0 | 45 | 13 | 7 | 26 | 2 |

=== Playoffs ===
| Year | Team | Games | | Tackles | | | | Interceptions | | | | Fumbles | | | |
| Year | Team | GP | GS | Comb | Solo | Ast | Sck | Int | Yds | TD | Lng | FF | FR | Yds | TD |
|---|---|---|---|---|---|---|---|---|---|---|---|---|---|---|---|
| 2000 | BAL | 4 | 4 | **18** | 14 | **4** | **2.0** | **2** | **19** | 0 | **15** | 0 | 0 | 0 | 0 |
| 2001 | BAL | 2 | 2 | 16 | **15** | 1 | 1.0 | 0 | 0 | 0 | 0 | **1** | 0 | 0 | 0 |
| 2005 | SEA | Did not play due to injury | | | | | | | | | | | | | |
| Career | | 6 | 6 | 34 | 29 | 5 | 3.0 | 2 | 19 | 0 | 15 | 1 | 0 | 0 | 0 |
