= Tony Banks (American football) =

American football player (born 1973)

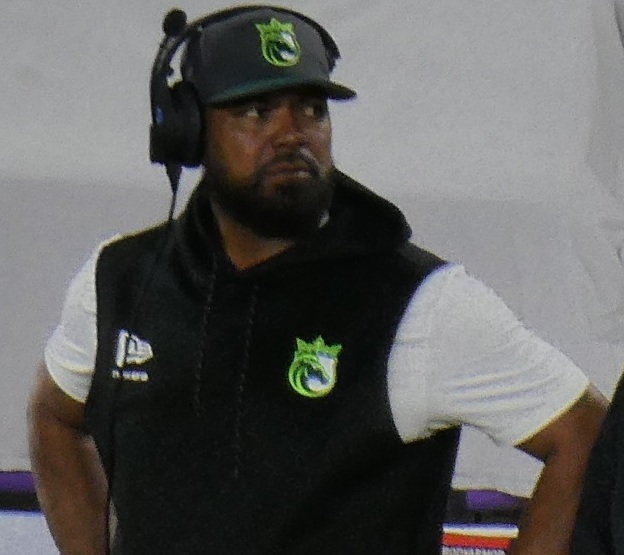
- Banks with the Louisville Kings in 2026

Louisville Kings
- Title: Wide receivers coach

Personal information
- Born: April 5, 1973 (age 53); San Diego, California, U.S.
- Listed height: 6 ft 4 in (1.93 m)
- Listed weight: 229 lb (104 kg)

Career information
- Position: Quarterback (No. 12)
- High school: Hoover (San Diego)
- College: San Diego Mesa (1992–1993); Michigan State (1994–1995)
- NFL draft: 1996: 2nd round, 42nd overall pick

Career history

Playing
- St. Louis Rams (1996–1998); Baltimore Ravens (1999–2000); Dallas Cowboys (2001)*; Washington Redskins (2001); Houston Texans (2002–2005)
- * Offseason or practice squad member only

Coaching
- Louisville Kings (2026–present) Wide receivers coach

Awards and highlights
- Super Bowl champion (XXXV); UFL champion (2026); PFWA All-Rookie Team (1996); Second-team All-Big Ten (1995)

Career NFL statistics
- Passing attempts: 2,356
- Passing completions: 1,278
- Completion percentage: 54.2
- TD–INT: 77–73
- Passing yards: 15,315
- Passer rating: 72.4
- Stats at Pro Football Reference

Anthony Lamar Banks (born April 5, 1973) is an American former professional football player who was a quarterback for 10 seasons in the National Football League (NFL). He is currently the wide receivers coach for the Louisville Kings of the United Football League (UFL). He played college football for the Michigan State Spartans. Selected by the St. Louis Rams in the second round of the 1996 NFL draft, Banks also was a member of the Baltimore Ravens, Washington Redskins, and Houston Texans. With the Ravens, he was part of the team that won the franchise's first Super Bowl title in Super Bowl XXXV.

== Early life ==
Banks attended Hoover High School in San Diego, California, and was a letterman in football, basketball, and baseball.

== College career ==
Banks played right field for the Minnesota Twins' Class A team in Ft. Myers, Florida, before enrolling at San Diego Mesa College in San Diego. He played there two years before transferring to Michigan State University. Banks places among the all-time record holders at Michigan State. He ranks sixth in passing completion percentage, tenth in career passing yards, and tenth in passing touchdowns. Banks was the first quarterback selected in the 1996 NFL draft.

In the October 2010 issue of Sports Illustrated, former NFL agent Josh Luchs claimed he paid Banks 'several hundred dollars a month' while Banks was at Michigan State, a violation of NCAA eligibility rules.

== Professional career ==
Pre-draft measurables
Height	Weight	Arm length	Hand span	40-yard dash	10-yard split	20-yard split	20-yard shuttle
6 ft 4 1/2 in (1.94 m)	220 lb (100 kg)	33 1/8 in (0.84 m)	9 1/2 in (0.24 m)	4.93 s	1.68 s	2.86 s	4.55 s

=== St. Louis Rams ===
Banks was selected in the second round of the 1996 NFL draft by the St. Louis Rams as the first quarterback selected in that year's draft. He soon found himself the starter as a rookie. Banks recorded significant yardage and touchdowns but also ended up setting a record for fumbles that first season, with 21. The team finished with a 6–10 record. Throughout the next two seasons Banks's play failed to improve significantly as the Rams finished last in their division with records of 5–11 and 4–12. During his time in St. Louis he developed a reputation for having a cocky attitude and a poor work ethic. After a 14–0 loss to the Miami Dolphins in Week 7 of 1998 he skipped the team flight back to St. Louis and did not appear at practice the next day. After three seasons with the Rams, the team signed Trent Green and then traded Banks to the Ravens for a fifth and seventh round draft pick.

=== Baltimore Ravens ===
Banks accumulated the best statistics of his career with the Baltimore Ravens. The Ravens started Scott Mitchell and Stoney Case early in 1999, but neither worked out, so the team turned to Banks. In 1999, he threw a career-high 17 TDs next to only eight interceptions. He also mustered 2,136 passing yards. Banks played well in early 2000, but his fumbles and interceptions cost the team two games in October. Feeling the offense needed a spark after failing to score a touchdown over an entire month, the team replaced him with backup Trent Dilfer, who would remain the starter through the team's Super Bowl XXXV win. He finished 2000 with eight touchdowns and eight interceptions and was released in the off-season.

=== Dallas Cowboys ===
Leading into the 2001 season, Banks was signed by the Dallas Cowboys to replace the recently released and later retired Troy Aikman; however, on August 15, 2001, Banks was abruptly released by the Cowboys who chose instead to go with rookie Quincy Carter.

=== Washington Redskins ===
Later that year, Banks signed with Washington during Marty Schottenheimer's one-year tenure as head coach. While with the Redskins, he became the first quarterback to follow an 0–5 start with five straight wins. He was released after the season.

=== Houston Texans ===
Banks signed with the Houston Texans. He was the second-string quarterback for the Houston Texans behind David Carr. He claims that he was asked by Houston's coaches not to play too well in practice to ensure that he would not upstage David Carr, who the team had drafted first overall in the 2002 NFL draft. During his four-year tenure with the team, Banks received minimal playing time. On February 28, 2006, Banks was released by the Texans. He never returned to the NFL.

== Career statistics ==
=== NFL ===
Legend
	Won the Super Bowl
**Bold**	Career high

==== Regular season ====
Year	Team	Games			Passing								Rushing				Sacks		Fumbles	
Year	Team	GP	GS	Record	Cmp	Att	Pct	Yds	Avg	TD	Int	Rtg	Att	Yds	Avg	TD	Sck	Yds	Fum	Lost
1996	STL	14	13	5–8	192	368	52.2	2,544	6.9	15	**15**	71.0	**61**	**212**	3.5	0	**48**	306	**21**	**11**
1997	STL	16	16	5–11	**252**	**487**	51.7	**3,254**	6.7	14	13	71.5	47	186	4.0	1	43	**317**	15	7
1998	STL	14	14	4–10	241	408	59.1	2,535	6.2	7	14	68.6	40	156	3.9	**3**	41	237	10	3
1999	BAL	12	10	6–4	169	320	52.8	2,136	6.7	**17**	8	81.2	24	93	3.9	0	33	190	11	6
2000	BAL	11	8	5–3	150	274	54.7	1,578	5.8	8	8	69.3	19	57	3.0	0	20	152	5	0
2001	WAS	15	14	8–6	198	370	53.5	2,386	6.4	10	10	71.3	47	152	3.2	2	29	173	10	2
2002	HOU	0	0	DNP																
2003	HOU	7	3	2–1	61	102	**59.8**	693	6.8	5	3	**84.3**	6	27	**4.5**	0	13	57	1	0
2004	HOU	5	0	—	1	2	50.0	16	**8.0**	0	0	77.1	0	0	0.0	0	0	0	0	0
2005	HOU	2	0	—	14	25	56.0	173	6.9	1	2	57.6	2	−2	−1.0	0	0	0	0	0
Career		96	78	35–43	1,278	2,356	54.2	15,315	6.5	77	73	72.4	246	881	3.6	6	227	1,432	73	29

==== Postseason ====
Year	Team	Games			Passing								Rushing				Sacks		Fumbles	
Year	Team	GP	GS	Record	Cmp	Att	Pct	Yds	Avg	TD	Int	Rtg	Att	Yds	Avg	TD	Sck	Yds	Fum	Lost
2000	BAL	3	0	—	0	3	0.0	0	0.0	0	0	39.6	1	−1	−1.0	0	0	0	0	0
Career		3	0	0–0	0	3	0.0	0	0.0	0	0	39.6	1	-1	-1.0	0	0	0	0	0

=== College ===
Season	Team	GP	Passing						
Season	Team	GP	Cmp	Att	Pct	Yds	TD	Int	Rtg
1994	Michigan State	11	145	238	60.9	2,040	11	6	143.1
1995	Michigan State	9	156	258	60.5	2,089	9	15	128.4
Career		20	301	496	60.7	4,129	20	21	135.5

== Coaching career ==
On March 9, 2020, the Greenhill School, a private K-12 school in Addison, Texas, announced that they were hiring Banks as their head football coach. He had previously served the school as an assistant coach.

Banks has been the wide receivers coach with the Louisville Kings since the 2026 season. He is one of five members of the Super Bowl XXXV Champion Ravens on the ballclub's coaching staff along with Chris Redman, Jamie Sharper, Chris McAlister and Brad Jackson.
