= 1999 Baltimore Ravens season =

NFL team season

- Owner: Art Modell
- General manager: Ozzie Newsome
- Head coach: Brian Billick
- Home stadium: PSINet Stadium

Results
- Record: 8–8
- Division place: 3rd AFC Central
- Playoffs: Did not qualify
- Pro Bowlers: T Jonathan Ogden; DE Michael McCrary; LB Peter Boulware; LB Ray Lewis; S Rod Woodson

The 1999 season was the Baltimore Ravens' fourth season in the National Football League (NFL) and the first under head coach Brian Billick. Though they missed the playoffs, they played tough against top division rival Jacksonville and trounced the eventual AFC Champion Titans to help finish the season strong with an 8–8 record.

The 1999 season also marked the first time the Ravens played in Cleveland since relocating from that city following the 1995 season. On November 7, they faced the "reactivated" Browns, who replaced the original franchise after Art Modell's move.

== Offseason ==
=== New logo ===
The Ravens were forced to switch their helmet logo for the 1999 season. Security guard Frederick Bouchat contended that he had created the Ravens’ logo—a “B” inside a winged shield—that had been used from the 1996 through 1998 seasons. Bouchat sued the team for $10 million, and although he received no damages, a judge upheld a jury's verdict supporting the claim.

The team's new logo—the profile of a raven's head with the letter "B"—was voted on by 7,000 fans in a poll by The Baltimore Sun. The updated logo remains in use by the team.

=== NFL draft ===
1999 Baltimore Ravens draft
Round	Pick	Player	Position	College	Notes
1	10	Chris McAlister *	Cornerback	Arizona	
4	105	Brandon Stokley	Wide receiver	Louisiana–Lafayette	
4	129	Edwin Mulitalo	Guard	Arizona	
7	216	Anthony Poindexter	Safety	Virginia	
Made roster * Made at least one Pro Bowl during career

== Personnel ==
=== Staff / Coaches ===
1999 Baltimore Ravens staff
Front office: Owner and CEO – Art Modell; President and coo – David Modell; Vice president of player personnel – Ozzie Newsome; Director of college scouting – Phil Savage; Director of pro personnel – James Harris; Personnel assistant – Joe Hortiz; Head coaches: Head coach – Brian Billick; Offensive coaches: Offensive coordinator – Matt Cavanaugh; Running backs – Matt Simon; Wide receivers – Milt Jackson; Tight ends/assistant offensive line – Wade Harman; Offensive line – Jim Colletto	Defensive coaches: Defensive coordinator – Marvin Lewis; Defensive line – Rex Ryan; Linebackers – Jack Del Rio; Defensive backs – Steve Shafer; Assistant defensive backs – Donnie Henderson; Defensive assistant/defensive line – Mike Smith; Special teams coaches: Special teams coordinator – Russ Purnell; Strength and conditioning: Head athletic trainer – Bill Tessendorf; Strength and conditioning – Jeff Friday; Assistant strength and conditioning – Chip Morton; Assistant strength and conditioning – Paul Ricci

=== Roster ===
1999 Baltimore Ravens roster
Quarterbacks (QB): 12 Tony Banks; 10 Stoney Case; 19 Scott Mitchell; Running backs (RB): 30 Obafemi Ayanbadejo FB; 29 Chuck Evans FB; 34 Jay Graham; 33 Priest Holmes; 32 Errict Rhett; Wide receivers (WR): 88 Justin Armour; 86 Billy Davis; 87 Qadry Ismail; 85 Patrick Johnson; 84 Jermaine Lewis; 11 Marcus Nash; Tight ends (TE): 85 Greg DeLong; 89 A. J. Ofodile	Offensive linemen (OL): 74 James Atkins T; 69 Jeff Blackshear G; 62 Mike Flynn C/G; 71 Spencer Folau T; 61 Everett Lindsay G/T; 60 Jeff Mitchell C; 64 Edwin Mulitalo G; 75 Jonathan Ogden T; 72 Sammy Williams T; Defensive linemen (DL): 90 Rob Burnett DE; 92 Martin Chase DT; 91 Lional Dalton DT; 94 Marques Douglas DT; 99 Michael McCrary DE; 98 Tony Siragusa DT; 96 Fernando Smith DE; 93 Keith Washington DE; 79 Larry Webster DT	Linebackers (LB): 58 Peter Boulware OLB; 51 Cornell Brown OLB; 50 Brad Jackson OLB; 52 Ray Lewis MLB; 53 Tyrell Peters MLB; 55 Jamie Sharper OLB; Defensive backs (DB): 45 Corey Harris; 20 Kim Herring SS; 25 DeRon Jenkins CB; 35 Clarence Love CB; 28 Chris McAlister CB; 42 Anthony Mitchell SS; 22 Duane Starks CB; 37 Bennie Thompson SS; 38 James Trapp CB; 26 Rod Woodson FS; Special teams (ST): 5 Kyle Richardson P; 3 Matt Stover K; 82 Frank Wainright LS	Practice squad: 67 Chris Harrison G; 18 Kendrick Nord WR; 97 Charles Preston DE; 63 Emmett Zitelli C; Reserve: 49 Ryan Collins TE (IR); 27 Stevon Moore S (IR); 81 Aaron Pierce TE (IR); 43 Anthony Poindexter S (IR); 80 Brandon Stokley WR (IR); 70 Harry Swayne T (IR); 44 Tony Vinson RB (IR); Rookies in italics 53 active, 7 reserve, 4 practice squad

== Preseason ==
=== Schedule ===
Week	Date	Opponent	Result	Venue	Record
1	August 12	at Philadelphia Eagles	W 10–7	Veterans Stadium	1–0
2	August 21	at Atlanta Falcons	W 19–6	Georgia Dome	2–0
3	August 28	Carolina Panthers	W 28–24	PSINet Stadium	3–0
4	September 3	New York Giants	W 28–24	PSINet Stadium	4–0

== Regular season ==
Week	Date	Opponent	Result	Record	Venue	Attendance
1	September 12	at St. Louis Rams	**L** 10–27	0–1	Trans World Dome	62,100
2	September 19	**Pittsburgh Steelers**	**L** 20–23	0–2	PSINet Stadium	68,965
3	September 26	**Cleveland Browns**	**W** 17–10	1–2	PSINet Stadium	68,803
4	October 3	at Atlanta Falcons	**W** 19–13 (OT)	2–2	Georgia Dome	50,712
5	October 10	at **Tennessee Titans**	**L** 11–14	2–3	Adelphia Coliseum	65,486
6	Bye					
7	October 21	Kansas City Chiefs	**L** 8–35	2–4	PSINet Stadium	68,771
8	October 31	Buffalo Bills	**L** 10–13	2–5	PSINet Stadium	68,673
9	November 7	at **Cleveland Browns**	**W** 41–9	3–5	Cleveland Browns Stadium	72,898
10	November 14	at **Jacksonville Jaguars**	**L** 3–6	3–6	Alltel Stadium	67,391
11	November 21	at **Cincinnati Bengals**	**W** 34–31	4–6	Cinergy Field	43,279
12	November 28	**Jacksonville Jaguars**	**L** 23–30	4–7	PSINet Stadium	68,428
13	December 5	**Tennessee Titans**	**W** 41–14	5–7	PSINet Stadium	67,854
14	December 12	at **Pittsburgh Steelers**	**W** 31–24	6–7	Three Rivers Stadium	46,715
15	December 19	New Orleans Saints	**W** 31–8	7–7	PSINet Stadium	67,597
16	December 26	**Cincinnati Bengals**	**W** 22–0	8–7	PSINet Stadium	68,036
17	January 2	at New England Patriots	**L** 3–20	8–8	Foxboro Stadium	50,263
Note: Intra-division opponents are in bold text.

=== Standings ===
AFC Central
	W	L	T	PCT	PF	PA	STK
^{(1)} Jacksonville Jaguars	14	2	0	.875	396	217	W1
^{(4)} Tennessee Titans	13	3	0	.813	392	324	W4
Baltimore Ravens	8	8	0	.500	324	277	L1
Pittsburgh Steelers	6	10	0	.375	317	320	L1
Cincinnati Bengals	4	12	0	.250	283	460	L2
Cleveland Browns	2	14	0	.125	217	437	L6
