= Chris McAlister =

American football player (born 1977)

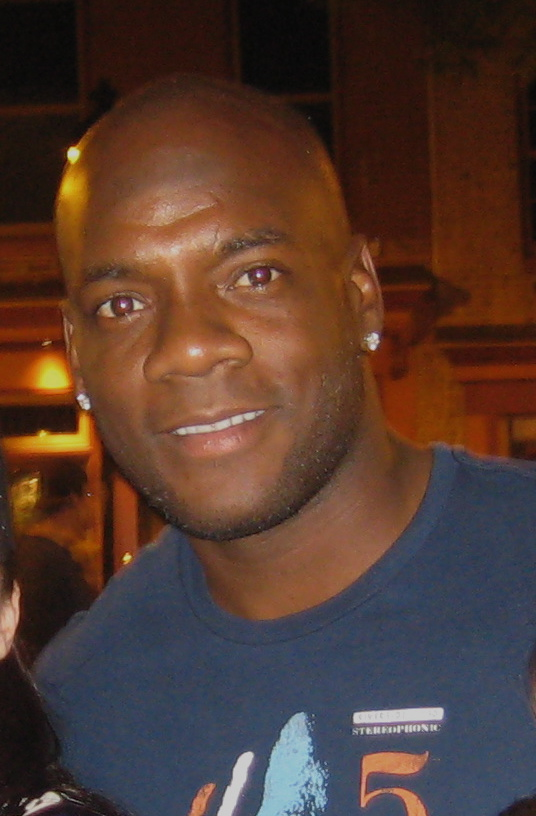

Louisville Kings
- Title: Defensive backs coach

Personal information
- Born: June 14, 1977 (age 49); Pasadena, California, U.S.
- Listed height: 6 ft 1 in (1.85 m)
- Listed weight: 210 lb (95 kg)

Career information
- Position: Cornerback (No. 28, 21, 29)
- High school: Pasadena
- College: Mt. San Antonio (1995); Arizona (1996–1998)
- NFL draft: 1999: 1st round, 10th overall pick

Career history

Playing
- Baltimore Ravens (1999–2008); New Orleans Saints (2009)

Coaching
- Louisville Kings (2026–present) Defensive backs coach

Awards and highlights
- Super Bowl champion (XXXV); UFL champion (2026); First-team All-Pro (2003); Second-team All-Pro (2004); 3× Pro Bowl (2003, 2004, 2006); Unanimous All-American (1998); 3× First-team All-Pac-10 (1996–1998); Arizona Wildcats No. 11 retired

Career NFL statistics
- Total tackles: 431
- Forced fumbles: 2
- Fumble recoveries: 6
- Pass deflections: 137
- Interceptions: 26
- Defensive touchdowns: 7
- Stats at Pro Football Reference

Christopher James McAlister (born June 14, 1977) is an American former professional football player who was a cornerback for 11 seasons in the National Football League (NFL). He is currently the defensive backs coach of the Louisville Kings of the United Football League (UFL). He played college football for the Arizona Wildcats, earning unanimous All-American honors. He was selected by the Baltimore Ravens in the first round of the 1999 NFL draft, and played for the Ravens for 10 seasons before playing his final season with the New Orleans Saints. He was the Ravens' starting right cornerback in the ballclub's Super Bowl XXXV triumph.

== Early life ==
McAlister was born in Pasadena, California, and attended Pasadena High School. As a high school football quarterback, he threw for 1,153 yards and rushed for 1,302 yards and also returned three punts and two interceptions for touchdowns. He won the conference player of the year and California's Most Valuable Player award in his senior year. McAlister also played basketball and, under Coach Bill Duwe, won the CIF championship in 1995. He also lettered in track. Pasadena High School retired his football jersey No. 9 in 2001.

== College career ==
McAlister originally committed to UCLA, where his father James played as a running back in the 1972–73 seasons. McAllister then went to Mt. San Antonio College before transferring to the University of Arizona and playing for the Arizona Wildcats football team from 1996 to 1998. In Arizona he received unanimous All-America first-team honors and was a first-team All-Pac-10 selection for 3 seasons. He was the 7th player in college football history (1st in Arizona history) to return a kickoff, punt and interception for touchdowns in the same season. His 18 interceptions at the end of his Arizona career ranked 3rd on the school's career-record chart behind Chuck Cecil and Jackie Wallace.

== Professional career ==
=== Pre-draft ===
Pre-draft measurables
Height	Weight	Arm length	Hand span	40-yard dash	10-yard split	20-yard split	20-yard shuttle	Three-cone drill	Vertical jump	Broad jump
6 ft 1 1/8 in (1.86 m)	205 lb (93 kg)	30 1/4 in (0.77 m)	10 in (0.25 m)	4.53 s	1.58 s	2.66 s	4.08 s	6.90 s	38.0 in (0.97 m)	10 ft 1 in (3.07 m)
All values from 1999 NFL Combine

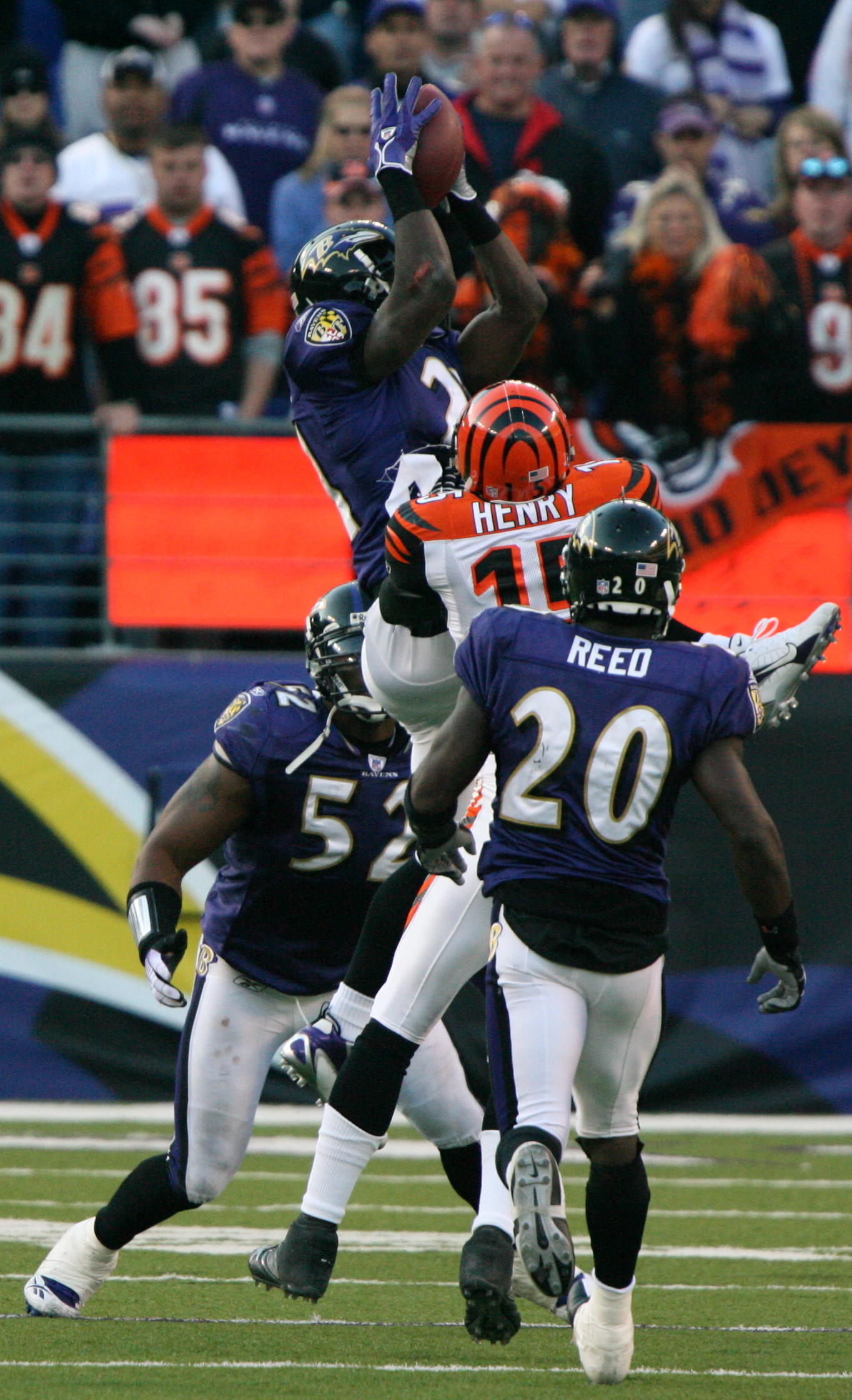
Chris McAlister leaps to grap an interception while playing against the Cincinnati Bengals in 2006.

=== Baltimore Ravens ===
The Baltimore Ravens selected Chris McAlister in the first round of the 1999 NFL draft, as the tenth overall pick.

McAlister had a solid rookie season in which he recorded 47 tackles (45 solo), 5 interceptions, and 16 passes deflected. He made his NFL debut at the St. Louis Rams on September 12, 1999. At season's end, he was named to College & Pro Football Newsweekly's 1999 All-Rookie Team. McAlister had another solid season in 2000 as the Ravens won the Super Bowl and he had a key interception in Super Bowl XXXV against the New York Giants. He returned an intercepted Vinny Testaverde pass 98 yards for a touchdown in the second quarter of the Ravens' 34–20 regular-season finale home victory over the New York Jets on December 24, 2000.

McAlister set an NFL record for the longest play when he returned an unsuccessful Jason Elam field goal attempt 107 yards for a touchdown to end the first half of the Ravens' 34–23 Monday Night Football win over the Denver Broncos on September 30, 2002.

McAlister earned his first Pro Bowl selection in 2003. He had 43 tackles. McAlister also intercepted three passes for 93 yards. That included an 83-yard run for a score. However, McAlister was suspended for the September 21 game at the San Diego Chargers for violating curfew and missing a team meeting.

On October 10, 2004, McAlister signed a 7-year, $55 million contract.

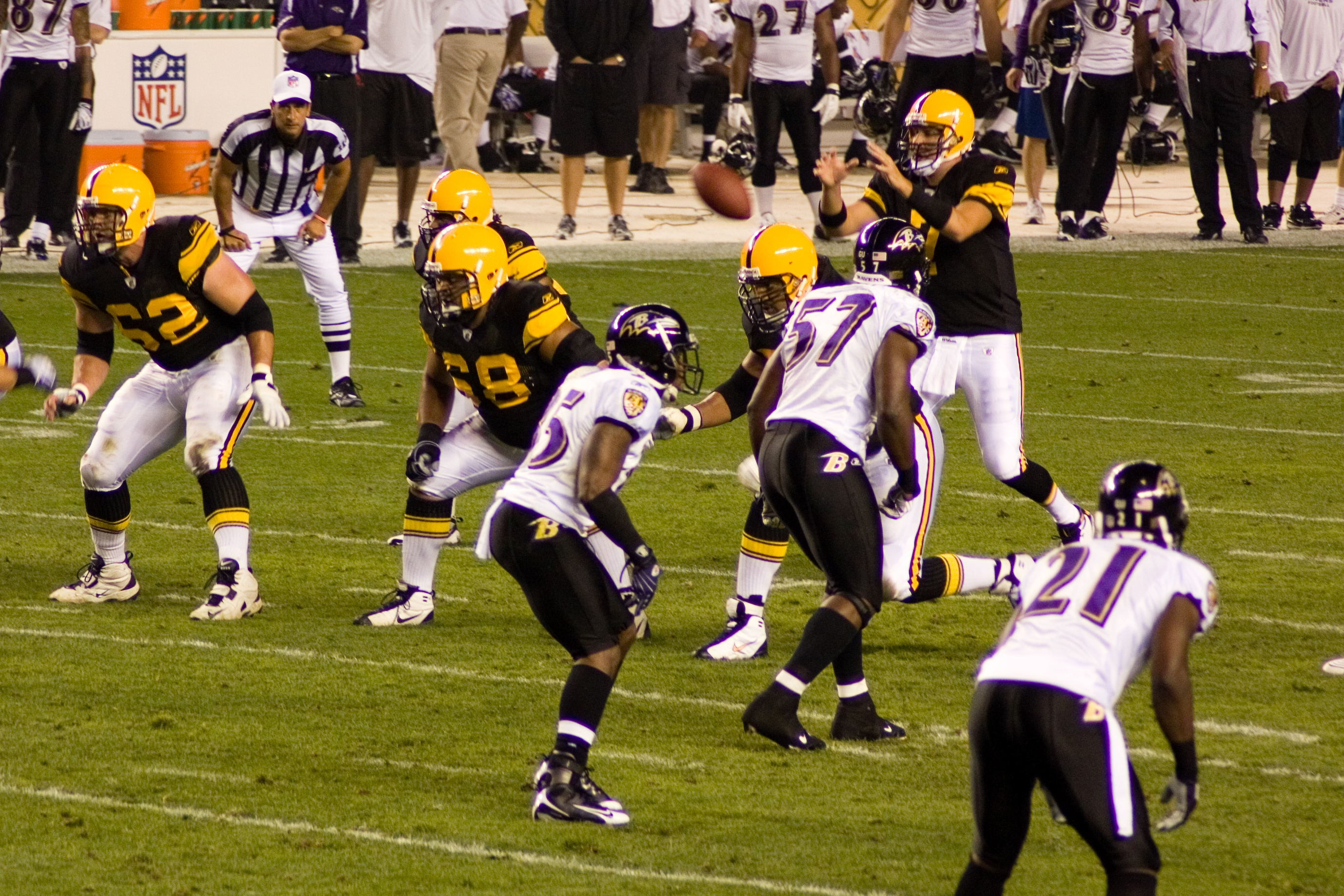
McAlister (21) playing against the Pittsburgh Steelers in 2008.

McAlister had arguably the best season of his career in 2006. He had two touchdowns that year and made his third Pro Bowl. But his last two seasons in Baltimore were marked by injuries and inconsistent play. In 2008, in 5 starts before being put on Injured Reserve, he did however amass 16 tackles, 3 INTs and 1 fumble recovery, showing some of his old form.

Chris McAlister had his contract terminated by the Baltimore Ravens on February 16, 2009.

=== New Orleans Saints ===
On November 17, 2009, McAlister signed with the New Orleans Saints. In a December 6 game at the Washington Redskins, McAlister forced a fumble in overtime, which started the drive resulting in a game-winning field goal for New Orleans. However, he was released on December 8, just two months before the Saints would go on to win Super Bowl XLIV. McAlister finished 2009 with 4 tackles and the forced fumble.

== NFL career statistics ==
Legend
**Bold**	Career high

=== Regular season ===
Year	Team	GP	Tackles				Fumbles		Interceptions					
Year	Team	GP	Comb	Solo	Ast	Sack	FF	FR	Int	Yds	Avg	Lng	TD	PD
1999	BAL	16	47	45	2	0.0	0	0	5	28	5.6	21	0	21
2000	BAL	16	41	35	6	0.0	0	1	4	**165**	41.3	**98**	1	14
2001	BAL	16	**71**	**63**	8	0.0	0	0	1	0	0.0	0	0	10
2002	BAL	13	53	48	5	0.0	0	0	1	0	0.0	0	0	18
2003	BAL	15	43	33	**10**	0.0	0	0	3	93	31.0	83	1	14
2004	BAL	15	42	38	4	0.0	0	1	1	51	**51.0**	51	1	9
2005	BAL	14	48	46	2	0.0	**1**	0	1	0	0.0	0	0	13
2006	BAL	16	47	43	4	0.0	0	**2**	**6**	121	20.2	60	**2**	**22**
2007	BAL	8	19	17	2	0.0	0	0	1	0	0.0	0	0	9
2008	BAL	6	16	13	3	0.0	0	1	3	28	9.3	16	0	7
2009	NO	2	4	4	0	0.0	**1**	1	0	0	0.0	0	0	0
Career		137	431	385	46	0.0	2	6	26	486	18.7	98	5	137

=== Postseason ===
Year	Team	GP	Tackles				Fumbles		Interceptions					
Year	Team	GP	Comb	Solo	Ast	Sack	FF	FR	Int	Yds	Avg	Lng	TD	PD
2000	BAL	4	**16**	**13**	**3**	0.0	0	0	**1**	4	4.0	4	0	**7**
2001	BAL	2	7	5	2	0.0	0	0	**1**	**18**	**18.0**	**18**	0	4
2003	BAL	1	3	2	1	0.0	0	0	**1**	0	0.0	0	0	2
2006	BAL	1	2	2	0	0.0	0	0	0	0	0.0	0	0	1
2008	BAL	0	Did not play due to injury											
Career		8	28	22	6	0.0	0	0	3	22	7.3	18	0	14

== Coaching career ==
McAlister has been the defensive backs coach with the Louisville Kings since the 2026 season. He is one of five members of the Super Bowl XXXV Champion Ravens on the ballclub's coaching staff along with Chris Redman, Jamie Sharper, Brad Jackson and Tony Banks.

== Personal life ==
Chris McAlister's father, James McAlister, also played in the NFL for three seasons for the New England Patriots and Philadelphia Eagles during the 1970s. McAlister is divorced and has one daughter. McAlister was married for three months.
