= Brad Jackson =

American football player (born 1975)

Louisville Kings
- Title: Linebackers coach

Personal information
- Born: January 11, 1975 (age 51); Canton, Ohio, U.S.
- Listed height: 6 ft 0 in (1.83 m)
- Listed weight: 230 lb (104 kg)

Career information
- Position: Linebacker (No. 50)
- High school: Firestone (Akron, Ohio)
- College: Cincinnati
- NFL draft: 1998: 3rd round, 79th overall pick

Career history

Playing
- Miami Dolphins (1998)*; Tennessee Oilers (1998)*; Baltimore Ravens (1998–2001); Carolina Panthers (2002)
- * Offseason or practice squad member only

Coaching
- Louisville Kings (2026–present) Linebackers coach

Awards and highlights
- Super Bowl champion (XXXV); UFL champion (2026)

Career NFL statistics
- Tackles: 54
- Pass deflections: 3
- Forced fumbles: 1
- Fumble recoveries: 4
- Stats at Pro Football Reference

Bradley Michael Jackson (born January 11, 1975) is an American former professional football player who was a linebacker in the National Football League (NFL). He is currently the linebackers coach for the Louisville Kings of the United Football League (UFL). He grew up in Anaheim, California and Akron, Ohio. He played six seasons in the NFL, from 1998 to 2003, for the Baltimore Ravens and the Carolina Panthers. He played high school football for the Firestone Falcons in Akron, OH.

He played both college football and college basketball at the University of Cincinnati, where he was coached by current West Virginia Men's Basketball Head Coach Bob Huggins. He is the third all-time leading tackler in school history. He was selected in the third round, 79th overall, in the 1998 NFL draft by the Miami Dolphins.

Jackson participated in the NFL Minority Coaching Fellowship Program with the Indianapolis Colts in 2007 and the Atlanta Falcons in 2010.

He has been a studio analyst for Comcast SportsNet Mid-Atlantic since the inception of its live Baltimore Ravens programming in September 2011. His assignments include Ravens Kickoff and Ravens Postgame Live on gameday and SportsNet Central: John Harbaugh Live the following day.

Jackson has been the linebackers coach with the Louisville Kings since the 2026 season. He is one of five members of the Super Bowl XXXV Champion Ravens on the ballclub's coaching staff along with Chris Redman, Jamie Sharper, Chris McAlister and Tony Banks.
