= Marques Douglas =

American football player (born 1977)

No. 95, 94, 91, 93, 99
- Position: Defensive tackle

Personal information
- Born: March 5, 1977 (age 49); Greensboro, North Carolina, U.S.
- Listed height: 6 ft 2 in (1.88 m)
- Listed weight: 292 lb (132 kg)

Career information
- High school: James B. Dudley (Greensboro)
- College: Howard
- NFL draft: 1999: undrafted

Career history
- Baltimore Ravens (1999); Rhein Fire (2000); New Orleans Saints (2000); Baltimore Ravens (2001–2004); San Francisco 49ers (2005–2007); Tampa Bay Buccaneers (2008)*; Baltimore Ravens (2008); New York Jets (2009); Miami Dolphins (2010)*; Tennessee Titans (2010)
- * Offseason or practice squad member only

Awards and highlights
- 3× All-MEAC (1996–1998); All-NFL Europe (2000)

Career NFL statistics
- Games played: 126
- Total tackles: 460
- Sacks: 20.5
- Forced fumbles: 7
- Fumble recoveries: 5
- Pass deflections: 10
- Defensive touchdowns: 1
- Stats at Pro Football Reference

Marques Lamont Douglas (/ˈmɑːrkɪs/; born March 5, 1977) is an American former professional football player who was a defensive tackle and defensive end for five teams in the National Football League (NFL) during an 11-year career. He played college football for the Howard Bison and was signed by the Baltimore Ravens as an undrafted free agent in 1999.

Douglas played for the Ravens, New Orleans Saints, San Francisco 49ers, New York Jets and the Tennessee Titans. He also played for Rhein Fire, an NFL Europe team, and was on the roster of the Miami Dolphins and Tampa Bay Buccaneers.

== Professional career ==
=== Early career ===
He was signed as an undrafted free agent by the Baltimore Ravens in 1999, though he didn't see any playing time. He played for the New Orleans Saints in 2000, active for one game. He returned to the Ravens from 2001 through 2004. During his time with the Ravens, he started 32 games, becoming a full-time starter for the 2003 and 2004 seasons, and registered a total of 147 tackles, 12 sacks, and three forced fumbles.

=== San Francisco 49ers ===
He was then signed as an unrestricted free agent by the San Francisco 49ers in 2005. He was brought in by Mike Nolan to help the 49ers adjust into the 3-4 defensive scheme. Douglas led all defensive linemen in tackles behind the line of scrimmage his last year.

=== Tampa Bay Buccaneers ===
On March 13, 2008, the Tampa Bay Buccaneers signed Douglas to a four-year contract.

=== Third stint with Ravens ===
On August 27, 2008, the Tampa Bay Buccaneers traded Douglas to the Baltimore Ravens for an undisclosed draft pick. He was released on February 27, 2009.

=== New York Jets ===
An unrestricted free agent after the 2008 season, Douglas signed with the New York Jets on March 13, 2009. Douglas' contract expired after the 2009 season and was not re-signed by the Jets.

=== Miami Dolphins ===
Douglas signed with the Miami Dolphins on July 23, 2010. He was cut on September 5, 2010.

=== Tennessee Titans ===
Douglas signed with the Tennessee Titans on November 9, 2010. He played in six regular season games for the Titans in 2010, his final season in the NFL.
