= 1999 Jacksonville Jaguars season =

5th season in franchise history

- Owner: Wayne Weaver
- Head coach: Tom Coughlin
- Defensive coordinator: Dom Capers
- Home stadium: Alltel Stadium

Results
- Record: 14–2
- Division place: 1st AFC Central
- Playoffs: Won Divisional Playoffs (vs. Dolphins) 62–7; Lost AFC Championship (vs. Titans) 14–33
- Pro Bowlers: OT Tony Boselli; OT Leon Searcy; WR Jimmy Smith; QB Mark Brunell; DE Tony Brackens; OLB Kevin Hardy; FS Carnell Lake

Uniform

The 1999 season was the Jacksonville Jaguars' 5th in the National Football League and their fifth under head coach Tom Coughlin. The Jaguars' regular season record of 14–2 still stands as their best record in franchise history. This would be the last time Jacksonville made the playoffs until 2005, the last season the team won a playoff game until 2007, the last time the Jaguars won any division title until they won the AFC South title in 2017, and the most recent time that the Jaguars have made the playoffs in consecutive seasons.

The Jaguars hired former Carolina Panthers head coach Dom Capers to be their defensive coordinator. Under Capers, the team went from 25th in 1998 to 4th in 1999 in total defense. The Jaguars defense yielded the fewest points in the NFL with 217 (an average of 13.6 points per game).

Pro Football Reference, however, argues that the 1999 Jaguars had the fifth-easiest schedule of any NFL team between 1971 and 2017. (Note: The four weaker schedules were, in order of increasing weakness, the 1979 Tampa Bay Buccaneers, the 1975 Minnesota Vikings, the 1991 Buffalo Bills, and the 1999 St. Louis Rams.) Both of their regular-season losses were to the Tennessee Titans, and they lost to Tennessee again in the AFC Championship Game, making the Titans the only team to beat them the entire season; Jacksonville did not reach the AFC Championship again until 2017. The only other occasion the Jaguars opposed a team with a winning record was their 62–7 demolition of the Miami Dolphins in the divisional playoff. Most significantly, Jacksonville missed Super Bowl champion St. Louis, despite defeating the other four teams then comprising the NFC West – including a 41–3 destruction of the San Francisco 49ers on opening day – while their non-division conference opponents were Broncos and Jets squads weakened by injuries to Terrell Davis and Vinny Testaverde.

Wide receiver Jimmy Smith set a franchise record for most receptions and receiving yards in one season. Smith would finish second in the NFL in receiving yards with 1,636 yards.

== Offseason ==
Additions	Subtractions
FS Carnell Lake (Steelers)	S Chris Hudson (Bears)
G Zach Wiegert (Rams)	S Travis Davis (Steelers)
LB Lonnie Marts (Oilers)	G Brian DeMarco (Bengals)
DT Gary Walker (Oilers)	

=== 1999 expansion draft ===
Jaguars selected during the expansion draft
Pick	Name	Position	Expansion team
21	Kevin Devine	Cornerback	Cleveland Browns

=== NFL draft ===
1999 Jacksonville Jaguars draft
Round	Pick	Player	Position	College	Notes
1	26	Fernando Bryant	Cornerback	Alabama	
2	56	Larry Smith	Defensive tackle	Florida State	
3	88	Anthony Cesario	Guard	Colorado State	
4	121	Kevin Landolt	Offensive tackle	West Virginia	
5	160	Jason Craft	Cornerback	Colorado State	
6	182	Emarlos Leroy	Defensive tackle	Georgia Bulldogs	
7	242	Dee Moronkola	Cornerback	Washington State	
7	246	Chris White	Defensive end	Southern	
Made roster

=== Undrafted free agents ===
1999 Undrafted free agents of note
Player	Position	College
Trevor Bollers	Fullback	Iowa
Rome Douglas	Offensive tackle	USC
Lenzie Jackson	Wide receiver	Arizona State
Ed Kehl	Defensive tackle	BYU
Dary Myricks	Defensive tackle	The Citadel
Brandon Southward	Linebacker	Colorado

== Staff ==
1999 Jacksonville Jaguars staff
Front office: Chairman/chief executive officer – Wayne Weaver; Senior vice president of football operations – Michael Huyghue; Director of player personnel - Rick Reiprish; Director of college scouting – Rick Mueller; Director of pro scouting – Fran Foley; College scout – Louis Clark; College scout – Gene Smith; Head coaches: Head coach – Tom Coughlin; Offensive coaches: Quarterbacks – Bobby Petrino; Running backs – Jerald Ingram; Wide receivers – Pete Carmichael; Tight ends – Fred Hoaglin; Offensive line – Mike Maser; Offensive quality control – John McNulty	Defensive coaches: Defensive coordinator – Dom Capers; Defensive line – John Pease; Linebackers – Steve Szabo; Outside linebackers – Lucious Selmon; Defensive backs – Perry Fewell; Assistant defensive backs – Joe Baker; Special teams coaches: Special teams coordinator – Larry Pasquale; Assistant special teams/administrative assistant to the head coach – John Bonamego; Strength and conditioning: Strength and conditioning – Jerry Palmieri; Assistant strength and conditioning – Greg Finnegan

== Final roster ==
1999 Jacksonville Jaguars roster
Quarterbacks (QB): 8 Mark Brunell; 11 Jay Fiedler; 12 Jonathan Quinn; Running backs (RB): 24 Chris Howard; 34 Stacey Mack; 31 Daimon Shelton FB; 33 James Stewart; 28 Fred Taylor; Wide receivers (WR): 84 Reggie Barlow; 83 Lenzie Jackson; 87 Keenan McCardell; 82 Jimmy Smith; 86 Alvis Whitted; Tight ends (TE): 80 Kyle Brady; 85 Rich Griffith; 88 Damon Jones	Offensive linemen (OL): 71 Tony Boselli T; 79 Anthony Cesario G; 62 Ben Coleman G; 67 Steve Ingram G; 65 Quentin Neujahr C; 72 Leon Searcy T; 76 Rich Tylski G; 66 John Wade C; 77 Zach Wiegert G; Defensive linemen (DL): 90 Tony Brackens DE; 93 Kevin Landolt DT; 61 Emarlos Leroy DT; 91 Seth Payne DT; 99 Joel Smeenge DE; 94 Larry Smith DT; 98 Regan Upshaw DE; 96 Gary Walker DT; 92 Chris White DE; 97 Renaldo Wynn DE	Linebackers (LB): 52 Brant Boyer OLB; 51 Kevin Hardy OLB; 56 Lonnie Marts MLB; 95 Bryce Paup OLB; 58 Bryan Schwartz MLB; 57 Corey Terry OLB; Defensive backs (DB): 21 Aaron Beasley CB; 25 Fernando Bryant CB; 23 Corey Chamblin CB; 29 Jason Craft CB; 20 Donovin Darius SS; 37 Carnell Lake FS; 38 Blaine McElmurry SS; 26 Rayna Stewart FS; 41 Dave Thomas CB; Special teams (ST): 4 Bryan Barker P; 1 Mike Hollis K; 2 Steve Lindsey K	Practice squad: 54 Chester Burnett LB; 42 Leroy Collins RB; 60 David Kempfert C; 36 Kevin Peoples S; 73 Rahmaan Streater DE; Reserve: 22 Tavian Banks RB (IR); 40 Trevor Bollers FB (IR); 75 Eric Curry DE (IR); 78 Todd Fordham T (IR); 32 Mike Logan S (IR); 55 Tom McManus LB (IR); -- Dee Moronkola CB (IR); 50 Erik Storz LB (IR); Rookies in italics 53 active, 8 reserve, 5 practice squad

== Preseason ==
Week	Date	Opponent	Result	Record	Stadium
1	August 13	Carolina Panthers	W 35–10	1–0	Alltel Stadium
2	August 21	at New York Giants	L 20–27	1–1	Giants Stadium
3	August 26	Kansas City Chiefs	W 21–22	2–1	Alltel Stadium
4	September 2	at Dallas Cowboys	W 27–6	3–1	Texas Stadium

== Regular season ==
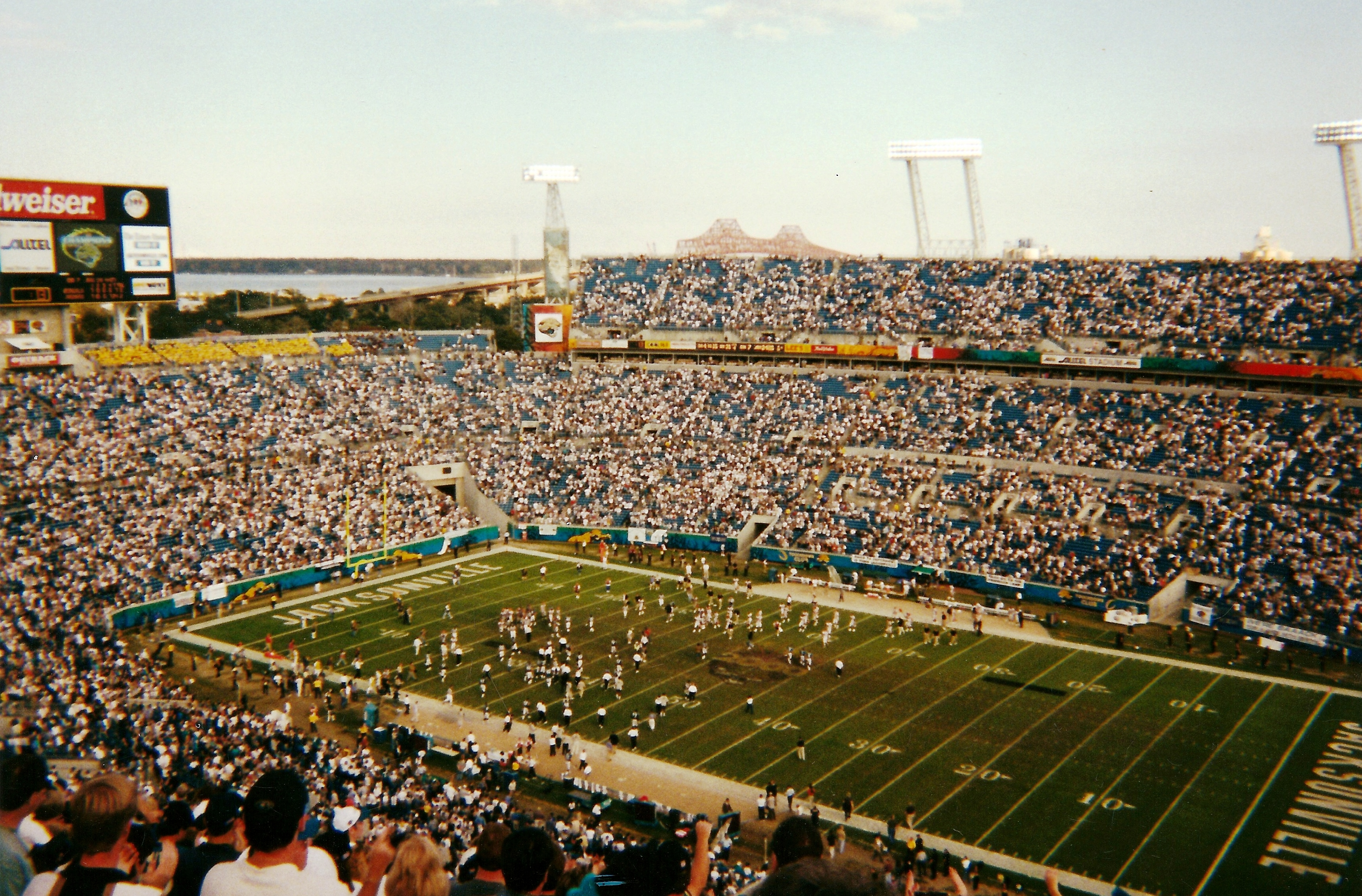
Week 17 against the Cincinnati Bengals.

=== Schedule ===
Week	Date	Opponent	Result	Record	Venue	Attendance
1	September 12	San Francisco 49ers	**W** 41–3	1–0	Alltel Stadium	68,678
2	September 19	at Carolina Panthers	**W** 22–20	2–0	Ericsson Stadium	64,261
3	September 26	**Tennessee Titans**	**L** 19–20	2–1	Alltel Stadium	61,502
4	October 3	at **Pittsburgh Steelers**	**W** 17–3	3–1	Three Rivers Stadium	57,308
5	October 11	at New York Jets	**W** 16–6	4–1	Giants Stadium	78,216
6	October 17	**Cleveland Browns**	**W** 24–7	5–1	Alltel Stadium	62,047
7	Bye					
8	October 31	at **Cincinnati Bengals**	**W** 41–10	6–1	Cinergy Field	49,138
9	November 7	at Atlanta Falcons	**W** 30–7	7–1	Georgia Dome	68,466
10	November 14	**Baltimore Ravens**	**W** 6–3	8–1	Alltel Stadium	57,391
11	November 21	New Orleans Saints	**W** 41–23	9–1	Alltel Stadium	69,772
12	November 28	at **Baltimore Ravens**	**W** 30–23	10–1	PSINet Stadium	68,428
13	December 2	**Pittsburgh Steelers**	**W** 20–6	11–1	Alltel Stadium	68,806
14	December 13	Denver Broncos	**W** 27–24	12–1	Alltel Stadium	71,357
15	December 19	at **Cleveland Browns**	**W** 24–14	13–1	Cleveland Browns Stadium	72,038
16	December 26	at **Tennessee Titans**	**L** 14–41	13–2	Adelphia Coliseum	66,641
17	January 2	**Cincinnati Bengals**	**W** 24–7	14–2	Alltel Stadium	70,532

Note: Intra-division opponents are in bold text.

=== Game summaries ===
==== Week 1: vs. San Francisco 49ers ====
Week One: San Francisco 49ers at Jacksonville Jaguars – Game summary

Quarter	1	2	3	4	Total
49ers	3	0	0	0	**3**
**Jaguars**	3	3	18	17	**41**

at Alltel Stadium, Jacksonville, Florida

- Date: September 12, 1999
- Game time: 4:15 p.m. EDT
- Game weather: 76 °F (24 °C)
- Game attendance: 68,678
- Referee: Bernie Kukar
- TV announcers (Fox): Kenny Albert and Tim Green
- Recap, Game Book

Game information

**First quarter**

- SF – Wade Richey 42-yard field goal, 7:38. 49ers 3–0. **Drive: 6 plays, 24 yards, 2:33.**
- JAX – Mike Hollis 41-yard field goal, 5:04. Tied 3–3. **Drive: 5 plays, 57 yards, 2:34.**

**Second quarter**

- JAX – Mike Hollis 32-yard field goal, 1:49. Jaguars 6–3. **Drive: 11 plays, 51 yards, 5:52.**

**Third quarter**

- JAX – Mike Hollis 50-yard field goal, 9:21. Jaguars 9–3. **Drive: 8 plays, 48 yards, 4:26.**
- JAX – Jason Craft 23-yard fumble return (run succeeded), 9:21. Jaguars 17–3.
- JAX – Damon Jones 4-yard pass from Mark Brunell (Mike Hollis kick), 1:37. Jaguars 24–3. **Drive: 9 plays, 56 yards, 4:33.**

**Fourth quarter**

- JAX – Mike Hollis 42-yard field goal, 14:46. Jaguars 27–3. **Drive: 5 plays, 32 yards, 0:41.**
- JAX – James Stewart 1-yard run (Mike Hollis kick), 9:13. Jaguars 34–3. **Drive: 7 plays, 51 yards, 3:34.**
- JAX – Aaron Beasley 93-yard interception return (Mike Hollis kick), 2:53. Jaguars 41–3.

Top passers

- SF – Steve Young – 9/26, 96 yards, 2 INT
- JAX – Mark Brunell – 22/30, 265 yards, TD

Top rushers

- SF – Charlie Garner – 11 rushes, 61 yards
- JAX – Fred Taylor – 24 rushes, 74 yards

Top receivers

- SF – Terrell Owens – 5 receptions, 76 yards
- JAX – Jimmy Smith – 6 receptions, 139 yards

==== Week 2: at Carolina Panthers ====
Week Two: Jacksonville Jaguars at Carolina Panthers – Game summary

Quarter	1	2	3	4	Total
**Jaguars**	3	3	6	10	**22**
Panthers	0	14	0	6	**20**

at Ericsson Stadium, Charlotte, North Carolina

- Date: September 19, 1999
- Game time: 1:00 p.m. EDT
- Game weather: Partly cloudy, 74 °F (23 °C)
- Game attendance: 64,261
- Referee: Bill Carollo
- TV announcers (CBS): Ian Eagle and Mark May
- Recap, Game Book

Game information

**First quarter**

- JAX – Mike Hollis 36-yard field goal, 5:42. Jaguars 3–0. **Drive: 12 plays, 69 yards, 6:34.**

**Second quarter**

- JAX – Mike Hollis 40-yard field goal, 12:50. Jaguars 6–0. **Drive: 13 plays, 70 yards, 5:45.**
- CAR – Wesley Walls 10-yard pass from Steve Beuerlein (John Kasay kick), 3:06. Panthers 7–6. **Drive: 10 plays, 71 yards, 4:58.**
- CAR – Muhsin Muhammad 60-yard pass from Steve Beuerlein (John Kasay kick), 1:28. Panthers 14–6. **Drive: 2 plays, 60 yards, 0:30.**

**Third quarter**

- JAX – James Stewart 1-yard run (pass failed), 7:31. Panthers 14–12. **Drive: 15 plays, 79 yards, 7:29.**

**Fourth quarter**

- JAX – Mike Hollis 31-yard field goal, 10:22. Jaguars 15–14. **Drive: 5 plays, 31 yards, 1:01.**
- JAX – James Stewart 44-yard run (Mike Hollis kick), 1:48. Jaguars 22–14. **Drive: 1 play, 44 yards, 0:07.**
- CAR – Wesley Walls 1-yard pass from Steve Beuerlein (John Kasay kick), 0:31. Jaguars 22–20. **Drive: 9 plays, 70 yards, 1:17.**

Top passers

- JAX – Mark Brunell – 20/32, 214 yards
- CAR – Steve Beuerlein – 16/26, 216 yards, 3 TD, INT

Top rushers

- JAX – James Stewart – 27 rushes, 124 yards, 2 TD
- CAR – Tim Biakabutuka – 6 rushes, 47 yards

Top receivers

- JAX – Jimmy Smith – 10 receptions, 115 yards
- CAR – Muhsin Muhammad – 4 receptions, 103 yards, TD

==== Week 3: vs. Tennessee Titans ====
Week Three: Tennessee Titans at Jacksonville Jaguars – Game summary

Quarter	1	2	3	4	Total
**Titans**	0	0	7	13	**20**
Jaguars	3	0	14	2	**19**

at Alltel Stadium, Jacksonville, Florida

- Date: September 26, 1999
- Game time: 4:05 p.m. EST
- Game weather: Rain, 75 °F (24 °C)
- Game attendance: 61,502
- Referee: Ron Winter
- TV announcers (CBS): Verne Lundquist and Dan Dierdorf
- Recap, Game Book

Game information

**First quarter**

- JAX – Mike Hollis 42-yard field goal, 3:25. Jaguars 3–0. **Drive: 8 plays, 65 yards, 4:04.**

**Second quarter**

- No scoring plays.

**Third quarter**

- TEN – Eddie George 8-yard pass from Neil O'Donnell (Al Del Greco kick), 12:48. Titans 7–3. **Drive: 3 plays, 9 yards, 1:33.**
- JAX – Jimmy Smith 11-yard pass from Mark Brunell (Mike Hollis kick), 1:18. Jaguars 10–7. **Drive: 10 plays, 64 yards, 5:31.**
- JAX – Aaron Beasley 35-yard interception return (Mike Hollis kick), 0:22. Jaguars 17–7.

**Fourth quarter**

- TEN – Al Del Greco 44-yard field goal, 11:26. Jaguars 17–10. **Drive: 8 plays, 29 yards, 3:56.**
- TEN – Al Del Greco 48-yard field goal, 8:31. Jaguars 17–13. **Drive: 5 plays, 36 yards, 1:13.**
- TEN – Michael Roan 12-yard pass from Neil O'Donnell (Al Del Greco kick), 3:26. Titans 20–17. **Drive: 7 plays, 45 yards, 1:41.**
- JAX – Penalty on Tennessee enforced in the end zone for a safety, 0:00. Titans 20–19

**Top passers**

- TEN – Neil O'Donnell – 17/32, 204 yards, 2 TD, INT
- JAX – Mark Brunell – 22/42, 232 yards, TD, 3 INT

**Top rushers**

- TEN – Eddie George – 18 rushes, 57 yards
- JAX – James Stewart – 25 rushes, 98 yards

**Top receivers**

- TEN – Kevin Dyson – 6 receptions, 79 yards
- JAX – Jimmy Smith – 10 receptions, 129 yards, TD

==== Week 4: at Pittsburgh Steelers ====
Week Four: Jacksonville Jaguars at Pittsburgh Steelers – Game summary

Quarter	1	2	3	4	Total
**Jaguars**	0	7	3	7	**17**
Steelers	0	3	0	0	**3**

at Three Rivers Stadium, Pittsburgh, Pennsylvania

- Date: September
- Game time: 1:00 p.m. EST
- Game weather: Partly cloudy, 62 °F (17 °C)
- Game attendance: 57,308
- Referee: Dick Hantak
- TV announcers (CBS): Verne Lundquist, Dan Dierdorf, and Bonnie Bernstein
- Recap, Game Book

Game information

**First quarter**

- No scoring plays.

**Second quarter**

- JAX – Keenan McCardell 7-yard pass from Mark Brunell (Mike Hollis kick), 14:15. Jaguars 7–3. **Drive: 11 plays, 63 yards, 5:27.**
- PIT – Kris Brown 48-yard field goal, 0:00. Jaguars 7–3. **Drive: 6 plays, 27 yards, 1:00.**

**Third quarter**

- JAX – Mike Hollis 27-yard field goal, 6:18. Jaguars 10–3. **Drive: 9 plays, 36 yards, 3:12.**

**Fourth quarter**

- JAX – Mike Hollis 41-yard field goal, 5:40. Jaguars 13–3. **Drive: 9 plays, 39 yards, 4:10.**
- JAX – Kordell Stewart fumble forced by Tony Brackens out of bounds in end zone for a safety, 4:47. Jaguars 15–3
- JAX – Kordell Stewart sacked in end zone by Joel Smeenge for a safety, 0:00. Jaguars 17–3

Top passers

- JAX – Mark Brunell – 10/25, 85 yards, TD, INT
- PIT – Kordell Stewart – 15/32, 126 yards, INT

Top rushers

- JAX – James Stewart – 21 rushes, 73 yards
- PIT – Jerome Bettis – 20 rushes, 58 yards

Top receivers

- JAX – Keenan McCardell – 3 receptions, 24 yards
- PIT – Jerome Bettis – 4 receptions, 27 yards

==== Week 5: at New York Jets ====
Week Five: Jacksonville Jaguars at New York Jets – Game summary

Quarter	1	2	3	4	Total
**Jaguars**	7	3	3	3	**16**
Jets	0	3	0	3	**6**

at The Meadowlands, East Rutherford, New Jersey

- Date: October 11, 1999
- Game time: 9:05 p.m. EDT
- Game weather: Clear, 61 °F (16 °C)
- Game attendance: 78,2016
- Referee: Bob McElwee
- Recap, Game Book

Game information

**First quarter**

- JAX – James Stewart 3-yard run (Mike Hollis kick), 6:28. Jaguars 7–0. **Drive: 13 plays, 61 yards, 6:35.**

**Second quarter**

- JAX – Mike Hollis 32-yard field goal, 5:27. Jaguars 10–0. **Drive: 6 plays, 39 yards, 3:39.**
- NYJ – John Hall 33-yard field goal, 1:38. Jaguars 10–3. **Drive: 9 plays, 35 yards, 3:49.**

**Third quarter**

- JAX – Mike Hollis 44-yard field goal, 10:14. Jaguars 13–3. **Drive: 9 plays, 61 yards, 4:46.**

**Fourth quarter**

- NYJ – John Hall 42-yard field goal, 8:53. Jaguars 13–6. **Drive: 13 plays, 56 yards, 6:30.**
- JAX – Mike Hollis 21-yard field goal, 1:46. Jaguars 16–6. **Drive: 4 plays, 3 yards, 0:51.**

**Top passers**

- JAX – Mark Brunell – 21/35, 215 yards
- NYJ – Rick Mirer – 19/38, 164 yards, 2 INT

**Top rushers**

- JAX – James Stewart – 26 rushes, 96 yards, TD
- NYJ – Curtis Martin – 18 rushes, 59 yards

**Top receivers**

- JAX – Keenan McCardell – 4 receptions, 60 yards
- NYJ – Keyshawn Johnson – 8 receptions, 94 yards

==== Week 6: vs. Cleveland Browns ====
Week Six: Cleveland Browns at Jacksonville Jaguars – Game summary

Quarter	1	2	3	4	Total
Browns	0	7	0	0	**7**
**Jaguars**	3	3	8	10	**24**

at Alltel Stadium, Jacksonville, Florida

- Date: October 17, 1999
- Game time: 1:00 p.m. EST
- Game weather: 71 °F (22 °C)
- Game attendance: 62,047
- Referee: Tony Corrente
- Recap, Game Book

Game information

**First quarter**

- JAX – Mike Hollis 20-yard field goal, 2:53. Jaguars 3–0. **Drive: 15 plays, 68 yards, 8:14.**

**Second quarter**

- CLE – Terry Kirby 9-yard pass from Tim Couch (Phil Dawson kick), 12:21. Browns 7–3. **Drive: 12 plays, 70 yards, 5:32.**
- JAX – Mike Hollis 36-yard field goal, 0:51. Browns 7–6. **Drive: 7 plays, 38 yards, 1:43.**

**Third quarter**

- JAX – Kyle Brady 7-yard pass from Jay Fiedler (pass succeeded), 1:47. Jaguars 14–7. **Drive: 3 plays, 25 yards, 1:13.**

**Fourth quarter**

- JAX – James Stewart 2-yard run (Mike Hollis kick), 5:54. Jaguars 21–7. **Drive: 12 plays, 70 yards, 6:40.**
- JAX – Mike Hollis 24-yard field goal, 0:44. Jaguars 24–7. **Drive: 11 plays, 42 yards, 3:57.**

**Top passers**

- CLE – Tim Couch – 18/23, 161 yards, TD
- JAX – Jay Fiedler – 12/14, 113 yards, TD

**Top rushers**

- CLE – Terry Kirby – 22 rushes, 71 yards
- JAX – James Stewart – 23 rushes, 58 yards, TD

**Top receivers**

- CLE – Darrin Chiaverini – 5 receptions, 45 yards
- JAX – Keenan McCardell – 7 receptions, 76 yards

==== Week 8: at Cincinnati Bengals ====
Week Eight: Jacksonville Jaguars at Cincinnati Bengals – Game summary

Quarter	1	2	3	4	Total
**Jaguars**	14	13	7	7	**41**
Bengals	0	0	3	7	**10**

at Cinergy Field, Cincinnati, Ohio

- Date: October 31, 1999
- Game time: 1:00 p.m. EST
- Game weather: Partly sunny, 69 °F (21 °C)
- Game attendance: 49,138
- Referee: Bernie Kukar
- Recap, Game Book

Game information

**First quarter**

- JAX – Fred Taylor 1-yard run (Mike Hollis kick), 10:38. Jaguars 7–0. **Drive: 8 plays, 64 yards, 4:22.**
- JAX – Keenan McCardell 23-yard pass from Mark Brunell (Mike Hollis kick), 6:30. Jaguars 14–0. **Drive: 8 plays, 58 yards, 2:34.**

**Second quarter**

- JAX – Mike Hollis 42-yard field goal, 14:46. Jaguars 17–0. **Drive: 7 plays, 12 yards, 2:39.**
- JAX – Jimmy Smith 3-yard pass from Mark Brunell (Mike Hollis kick), 5:54. Jaguars 24–0. **Drive: 9 plays, 98 yards, 4:26.**
- JAX – Mike Hollis 21-yard field goal, 1:46. Jaguars 27–0. **Drive: 7 plays, 36 yards, 2:20.**

**Third quarter**

- CIN – Doug Pelfrey 29-yard field goal, 7:20. Jaguars 27–3. **Drive: 13 plays, 64 yards, 7:40.**
- JAX – James Stewart 1-yard run (Mike Hollis kick), 1:41. Jaguars 34–3. **Drive: 2 plays, 5 yards, 0:26.**

**Fourth quarter**

- JAX – James Stewart 1-yard run (Mike Hollis kick), 6:37. Jaguars 41–3. **Drive: 8 plays, 47 yards, 3:53.**
- CIN – Willie Jackson 15-yard pass from Jeff Blake (Doug Pelfrey kick), 0:00. Jaguars 41–10. **Drive: 7 plays, 64 yards, 3:08.**

Top passers

- JAX – Mark Brunell – 11/19, 145 yards, 2 TD
- CIN – Jeff Blake – 13/23, 155 yards, TD

Top rushers

- JAX – Fred Taylor – 15 rushes, 128 yards, TD
- CIN – Akili Smith – 3 rushes, 40 yards

Top receivers

- JAX – Jimmy Smith – 8 receptions, 89 yards, TD
- CIN – Michael Basnight – 3 receptions, 47 yards

==== Week 9: at Atlanta Falcons ====
Week Nine: Jacksonville Jaguars at Atlanta Falcons – Game summary

Quarter	1	2	3	4	Total
**Jaguars**	7	10	10	3	**30**
Falcons	0	0	7	0	**7**

at Georgia Dome, Atlanta, Georgia

- Date: November 7, 1999
- Game time: 1:00 p.m. EST
- Game weather: None (indoor stadium)
- Game attendance: 68,466
- Referee: Bob McElwee
- Recap, Game Book

Game information

**First quarter**

- JAX – Jimmy Smith 44-yard pass from Mark Brunell (Mike Hollis kick), 7:04. Jaguars 7–0. **Drive: 1 play, 44 yards, 0:07.**

**Second quarter**

- JAX – Damon Jones 9-yard pass from Mark Brunell (Mike Hollis kick), 14:14. Jaguars 14–0. **Drive: 6 plays, 84 yards, 2:56.**
- JAX – Mike Hollis 27-yard field goal, 8:36. Jaguars 17–0. **Drive: 11 plays, 55 yards, 5:11.**
- ATL – Tim Dwight 17-yard pass from Chris Chandler (Morten Andersen kick), 0:29. Jaguars 17–7. **Drive: 12 plays, 81 yards, 6:10.**

**Third quarter**

- JAX – Mike Hollis 24-yard field goal, 8:10. Jaguars 20–7. **Drive: 10 plays, 41 yards, 4:39.**
- JAX – Keenan McCardell 2-yard pass from Mark Brunell (Mike Hollis kick), 1:41. Jaguars 27–7. **Drive: 11 plays, 44 yards, 5:11.**

**Fourth quarter**

- JAX – Mike Hollis 34-yard field goal, 4:29. Jaguars 30–7. **Drive: 8 plays, 24 yards, 2:59.**

Top passers

- JAX – Mark Brunell – 14/27, 203 yards, 3 TD
- ATL – Chris Chandler – 14/25, 163 yards, TD, 2 INT

Top rushers

- JAX – Fred Taylor – 27 rushes, 124 yards
- ATL – Byron Hanspard – 4 rushes, 11 yards

Top receivers

- JAX – Jimmy Smith – 4 receptions, 77 yards, TD
- ATL – Brian Kozlowski – 3 receptions, 49 yards

==== Week 10: vs. Baltimore Ravens ====
Week Ten: Baltimore Ravens at Jacksonville Jaguars – Game summary

Quarter	1	2	3	4	Total
Ravens	0	3	0	0	**3**
**Jaguars**	0	3	3	0	**6**

at Alltel Stadium, Jacksonville, Florida

- Date: November 14, 1999
- Game time: 4:05 p.m. EST
- Game weather: Clear, 77 °F (25 °C)
- Game attendance: 57,391
- Referee: Walt Coleman
- Recap, Game Book

Game information

**First quarter**

- No scoring plays.

**Second quarter**

- JAX – Mike Hollis 28-yard field goal, 0:06. Jaguars 3–0. **Drive: 2 plays, 0 yards, 0:08.**
- BAL – Matt Stover 23-yard field goal, 1:29. Tied 3–3. **Drive: 7 plays, 65 yards, 3:05.**

**Third quarter**

- JAX – Mike Hollis 28-yard field goal, 0:06. Jaguars 6–3. **Drive: 2 plays, 0 yards, 0:08.**

**Fourth quarter**

- No scoring plays.

Top passers

- BAL – Stoney Case – 7/12, 103 yards
- JAX – Mark Brunell – 20/29, 118 yards

Top rushers

- BAL – Errict Rhett – 19 rushes, 50 yards
- JAX – James Stewart – 18 rushes, 25 yards

Top receivers

- BAL – Justin Armour – 2 receptions, 44 yards
- JAX – Jimmy Smith – 7 receptions, 52 yards

==== Week 11: vs. New Orleans Saints ====
Week Eleven: New Orleans Saints at Jacksonville Jaguars – Game summary

Quarter	1	2	3	4	Total
Saints	7	10	0	6	**23**
**Jaguars**	14	3	14	10	**41**

at Alltel Stadium, Jacksonville, Florida

- Date: November 21
- Game time: 8:20 p.m. EST
- Game weather: Drizzle, 62 °F (17 °C)
- Game attendance: 69,772
- Referee: Tom White
- TV announcers (ESPN): Mike Patrick, Joe Theismann, and Solomon Wilcots
- Recap, Game Book

Game information

**First quarter**

- JAX – Reggie Barlow 74-yard punt return (Mike Hollis kick), 13:09. Jaguars 7–0.
- NO – Billy Joe Tolliver 1-yard run (Doug Brien kick), 5:28. Tied 7–7. **Drive: 12 plays, 80 yards, 7:41.**
- JAX – Damon Jones 7-yard pass from Mark Brunell (Mike Hollis kick), 1:30. Jaguars 14–7. **Drive: 7 plays, 74 yards, 3:58.**

**Second quarter**

- NO – Ricky Williams 19-yard run (Doug Brien kick), 13:05. Tied 14–14. **Drive: 6 plays, 79 yards, 3:25.**
- NO – Doug Brien 52-yard field goal, 1:48. Saints 17–14. **Drive: 6 plays, 35 yards, 2:44.**
- JAX – Mike Hollis 42-yard field goal, 0:00. Tied 17–17. **Drive: 8 plays, 42 yards, 1:48.**

**Third quarter**

- JAX – James Stewart 4-yard run (Mike Hollis kick), 12:26. Jaguars 24–17. **Drive: 4 plays, 67 yards, 2:34.**
- JAX – Jimmy Smith 46-yard pass from Mark Brunell (Mike Hollis kick), 13:57. Jaguars 31–17. **Drive: 3 plays, 58 yards, 1:19.**

**Fourth quarter**

- JAX – Mike Hollis 32-yard field goal, 10:28. Jaguars 34–17. **Drive: 11 plays, 57 yards, 4:56.**
- JAX – James Stewart 1-yard run (Mike Hollis kick), 7:30. Jaguars 41–17. **Drive: 5 plays, 29 yards, 2:06.**
- NO – Ricky Williams 4-yard run (run failed), 4:23. Jaguars 41–23. **Drive: 7 plays, 70 yards, 3:07.**

Top passers

- NO – Billy Joe Tolliver – 10/14, 159 yards
- JAX – Mark Brunell – 19/30, 351 yards, 2 TD, INT

Top rushers

- NO – Ricky Williams – 19 rushes, 94 yards, 2 TD
- JAX – James Stewart – 16 rushes, 87 yards, 2 TD

Top receivers

- NO – Scott Slutzker – 3 receptions, 64 yards
- JAX – Jimmy Smith – 9 receptions, 220 yards, TD

==== Week 12: at Baltimore Ravens ====
Week Twelve: Jacksonville Jaguars at Baltimore Ravens – Game summary

Quarter	1	2	3	4	Total
**Jaguars**	7	10	10	3	**30**
Ravens	0	0	7	0	**7**

at PSINet Stadium, Baltimore, Maryland

- Date: November 28, 1999
- Game time: 1:00 p.m. EST
- Game weather: Sunny, 54 °F (12 °C)
- Game attendance: 68,428
- Referee: Ron Winter
- Recap, Game Book

Game information

**First quarter**

- BAL – Errict Rhett 20-yard pass from Tony Banks (Matt Stover kick), 8:07. Ravens 7–0. **Drive: 3 plays, 87 yards, 1:43.**
- BAL – Matt Stover 46-yard field goal, 3:18. Ravens 10–0. **Drive: 6 plays, 17 yards, 2:39.**

**Second quarter**

- JAX – Jimmy Smith 8-yard pass from Mark Brunell (Mike Hollis kick), 10:38. Ravens 10–7. **Drive: 9 plays, 85 yards, 4:14.**
- BAL – Matt Stover 31-yard field goal, 1:00. Ravens 13–7. **Drive: 12 plays, 67 yards, 4:38.**

**Third quarter**

- BAL – Matt Stover 33-yard field goal, 0:04. Ravens 16–7. **Drive: 12 plays, 57 yards, 6:28.**

**Fourth quarter**

- JAX – Keenan McCardell 1-yard pass from Mark Brunell (Mike Hollis kick), 11:00. Ravens 16–14. **Drive: 8 plays, 61 yards, 4:04.**
- JAX – Tony Brackens 16-yard punt return (pass succeeded), 10:44. Jaguars 22–16.
- BAL – Chuck Evans 3-yard pass from Tony Banks (Matt Stover kick), 6:26. Ravens 23–22. **Drive: 4 plays, 49 yards, 1:04.**
- JAX – James Stewart 4-yard run (pass succeeded), 1:39. Jaguars 30–23. **Drive: 12 plays, 78 yards, 4:47.**

Top passers

- JAX – Mark Brunell – 27/47, 338 yards, 2 TD, 2 INT
- BAL – Tony Banks – 17/34, 214 yards, 2 TD, INT

Top rushers

- JAX – James Stewart – 20 rushes, 46 yards, TD
- BAL – Chuck Evans – 8 rushes, 47 yards

Top receivers

- JAX – Jimmy Smith – 10 receptions, 132 yards, TD
- BAL – Qadry Ismail – 5 receptions, 76 yards

==== Week 13: vs. Pittsburgh Steelers ====
Week Thirteen: Pittsburgh Steelers at Jacksonville Jaguars – Game summary

Quarter	1	2	3	4	Total
Steelers	3	0	3	0	**6**
**Jaguars**	0	6	7	7	**20**

at Alltel Stadium, Jacksonville, Florida

- Date: December 2, 1999
- Game time: 8:25 p.m. EST
- Game weather: 46 °F (8 °C)
- Game attendance: 68,806
- Referee: Bill Carollo
- Recap, Game Book

Game information

**First quarter**

- PIT – Kris Brown 40-yard field goal, 8:51. Steelers 3–0. **Drive: 9 plays, 36 yards, 3:54.**

**Second quarter**

- JAX – Mike Hollis 25-yard field goal, 2:00. Tied 3–3. **Drive: 10 plays, 83 yards, 4:26.**
- JAX – Mike Hollis 32-yard field goal, 0:00. Jaguars 6–3. **Drive: 7 plays, 34 yards, 1:26.**

**Third quarter**

- PIT – Kris Brown 40-yard field goal, 9:42. Tied 6–6. **Drive: 5 plays, 20 yards, 2:07.**
- JAX – Jimmy Smith 27-yard pass from Mark Brunell (Mike Hollis kick), 6:05. Jaguars 13–6. **Drive: 8 plays, 86 yards, 3:37.**

**Fourth quarter**

- JAX – James Stewart 1-yard run (Mike Hollis kick), 8:06. Jaguars 20–6. **Drive: 10 plays, 80 yards, 4:21.**

Top passers

- PIT – Mike Tomczak – 19/39, 194 yards
- JAX – Mark Brunell – 25/37, 308 yards, TD

Top rushers

- PIT – Richard Huntley – 2 rushes, 37 yards
- JAX – James Stewart – 30 rushes, 145 yards, TD

Top receivers

- PIT – Bobby Shaw – 4 receptions, 52 yards
- JAX – Jimmy Smith – 10 receptions, 124 yards, TD

==== Week 14: vs. Denver Broncos ====
Week Fourteen: Denver Broncos at Jacksonville Jaguars – Game summary

Quarter	1	2	3	4	Total
Broncos	7	7	3	7	**24**
**Jaguars**	0	17	0	10	**27**

at Alltel Stadium, Jacksonville, Florida

- Date: December 13, 1999
- Game time: 9:00 p.m. EST
- Game weather: 68 °F (20 °C)
- Game attendance: 71,357
- Referee: Gerry Austin
- Recap, Game Book

Game information

**First quarter**

- DEN – Rod Smith 22-yard pass from Brian Griese (Jason Elam kick), 8:01. Broncos 7–0. **Drive: 8 plays, 86 yards, 3:37.**

**Second quarter**

- DEN – Olandis Gary 1-yard run (Jason Elam kick), 13:40. Broncos 14–0. **Drive: 10 plays, 80 yards, 4:21.**
- JAX – James Stewart 5-yard run (Mike Hollis kick), 6:15. Broncos 14–7. **Drive: 10 plays, 80 yards, 4:21.**
- JAX – Mike Hollis 49-yard field goal, 2:44. Broncos 14–10. **Drive: 7 plays, 34 yards, 1:26.**
- JAX – James Stewart 1-yard run (Mike Hollis kick), 0:29. Jaguars 17–14. **Drive: 10 plays, 80 yards, 4:21.**

**Third quarter**

- DEN – Jason Elam 40-yard field goal, 2:44. Tied 17–17. **Drive: 7 plays, 34 yards, 1:26.**

**Fourth quarter**

- JAX – Fred Taylor 38-yard run (Mike Hollis kick), 2:35. Jaguars 24–17. **Drive: 8 plays, 64 yards, 4:22.**
- DEN – Byron Chamberlain 57-yard pass from Brian Griese (Jason Elam kick), 1:43. Tied 24–24. **Drive: 8 plays, 86 yards, 3:37.**
- JAX – Mike Hollis 23-yard field goal, 0:00. Jaguars 27–24. **Drive: 7 plays, 34 yards, 1:26.**

Top passers

- DEN – Brian Griese – 21/33, 275 yards, 2 TD, 2 INT
- JAX – Mark Brunell – 11/25, 115 yards

Top rushers

- DEN – Olandis Gary – 20 rushes, 67 yards, TD
- JAX – James Stewart – 18 rushes, 79 yards, 2 TD

Top receivers

- DEN – Byron Chamberlain – 3 receptions, 75 yards, TD
- JAX – Jimmy Smith – 5 receptions, 55 yards

==== Week 15: at Cleveland Browns ====
Week Fifteen: Jacksonville Jaguars at Cleveland Browns – Game summary

Quarter	1	2	3	4	Total
**Jaguars**	0	14	3	7	**24**
Browns	0	7	7	0	**14**

at Cleveland Browns Stadium, Cleveland, Ohio

- Date: December 19, 1999
- Game time: 1:00 p.m. EST
- Game weather: Sun then clouds, 39 °F (4 °C)
- Game attendance: 72,038
- Referee: Jeff Triplette
- Recap, Game Book

Game information

**First quarter**

- No scoring plays.

**Second quarter**

- JAX – Damon Jones 3-yard pass from Mark Brunell (Mike Hollis kick), 13:29. Jaguars 7–0. **Drive: 3 plays, 6 yards, 1:19.**
- JAX – Mark Brunell 9-yard run (Mike Hollis kick), 8:13. Jaguars 30–23. **Drive: 7 plays, 62 yards, 3:59.**
- CLE – Terry Kirby 1-yard run (Phil Dawson kick), 2:09. Jaguars 14–7. **Drive: 11 plays, 68 yards, 6:04.**

**Third quarter**

- JAX – Mike Hollis 41-yard field goal, 9:36. Jaguars 17–7. **Drive: 11 plays, 50 yards, 5:24.**
- CLE – Darrin Chiaverini 10-yard pass from Ty Detmer (Phil Dawson kick), 1:20. Jaguars 17–14. **Drive: 6 plays, 62 yards, 2:29.**

**Fourth quarter**

- JAX – Fred Taylor 41-yard run (Mike Hollis kick), 10:10. Jaguars 24–14. **Drive: 1 play, 41 yards, 0:08.**

Top passers

- JAX – Mark Brunell – 21/33, 267 yards, TD, INT
- CLE – Ty Detmer – 13/24, 153 yards, TD

Top rushers

- JAX – Fred Taylor – 26 rushes, 136 yards, TD
- CLE – Karim Abdul-Jabbar – 13 rushes, 36 yards

Top receivers

- JAX – Jimmy Smith – 8 receptions, 134 yards
- CLE – Darrin Chiaverini – 10 receptions, 108 yards, TD

==== Week 16: at Tennessee Titans ====
Week Sixteen: Jacksonville Jaguars at Tennessee Titans – Game summary

Quarter	1	2	3	4	Total
Jaguars	0	7	7	0	**14**
**Titans**	7	17	14	3	**41**

at Adelphia Coliseum, Nashville, Tennessee

- Date: December 26, 1999
- Game time: 1:00 p.m. EST
- Game weather: Clear, 46 °F (8 °C)
- Game attendance: 66,641
- Referee: Walt Coleman
- Recap, Game Book

Game information

**First quarter**

- TEN – Michael Roan 4-yard pass from Steve McNair (Al Del Greco kick), 7:24. Titans 7–0. **Drive: 13 plays, 78 yards, 7:36.**

**Second quarter**

- TEN – Jackie Harris 62-yard pass from Steve McNair (Al Del Greco kick), 14:46. Titans 14–0. **Drive: 7 plays, 95 yards, 3:33.**
- TEN – Al Del Greco 30-yard field goal, 8:56. Titans 17–0. **Drive: 9 plays, 31 yards, 4:50.**
- JAX – Fred Taylor 1-yard run (Mike Hollis kick), 2:54. Titans 17–7. **Drive: 6 plays, 90 yards, 2:40.**
- TEN – Yancey Thigpen 2-yard pass from Steve McNair (Al Del Greco kick), 0:25. Titans 24–7. **Drive: 9 plays, 71 yards, 2:29.**

**Third quarter**

- TEN – Isaac Byrd 65-yard pass from Steve McNair (Al Del Greco kick), 7:07. Titans 31–7. **Drive: 1 play, 69 yards, 0:11.**
- TEN – Kevin Dyson 13-yard pass from Steve McNair (Al Del Greco kick), 3:24. Titans 38–7. **Drive: 7 plays, 36 yards, 3:21.**
- JAX – Alvis Whitted 98-yard kickoff return (Mike Hollis kick), 3:06. Titans 38–14.

**Fourth quarter**

- TEN – Al Del Greco 20-yard field goal, 11:20. Titans 41–14. **Drive: 12 plays, 62 yards, 6:46.**

Top passers

- JAX – Jay Fiedler – 8/22, 101 yards, 2 INT
- TEN – Steve McNair – 23/33, 291 yards, 5 TD

Top rushers

- JAX – Fred Taylor – 16 rushes, 44 yards, TD
- TEN – Eddie George – 26 rushes, 102 yards

Top receivers

- JAX – Jimmy Smith – 4 receptions, 104 yards
- TEN – Frank Wycheck – 9 receptions, 64 yards

==== Week 17: vs. Cincinnati Bengals ====
Week Seventeen: Cincinnati Bengals at Jacksonville Jaguars – Game summary

Quarter	1	2	3	4	Total
Bengals	7	0	0	0	**7**
**Jaguars**	7	10	0	7	**24**

at Alltel Stadium, Jacksonville, Florida

- Date: January 2, 2000
- Game time: 1:00 p.m. EST
- Game weather: Sunny, 75 °F (24 °C)
- Game attendance: 70,532
- Referee: Larry Nemmers
- TV announcers (CBS): Tim Brando and Charles Mann
- Recap, Game Book

Game information

**First quarter**

- CIN – Sedrick Shaw 8-yard run (Doug Pelfrey kick), 9:15. Bengals 7–0. **Drive: 4 plays, 80 yards, 1:21.**
- JAX – Fred Taylor 13-yard run (Mike Hollis kick), 5:34. Tied 7–7. **Drive: 8 plays, 60 yards, 3:41.**

**Second quarter**

- JAX – Keenan McCardell 25-yard pass from Jay Fiedler (Mike Hollis kick), 13:15. Jaguars 14–7. **Drive: 9 plays, 64 yards, 3:31.**
- JAX – Mike Hollis 27-yard field goal, 0:21. Jaguars 17–7. **Drive: 12 plays, 54 yards, 2:52.**

**Third quarter**

- No scoring plays.

**Fourth quarter**

- JAX – Fred Taylor 1-yard run (Mike Hollis kick), 9:19. Jaguars 24–7. **Drive: 6 plays, 53 yards, 2:50.**

Top passers

- CIN – Jeff Blake – 13/23, 141 yards, 2 INT
- JAX – Jay Fiedler – 28/39, 317 yards, TD

Top rushers

- CIN – Michael Basnight – 10 rushes, 86 yards
- JAX – Fred Taylor – 22 rushes, 85 yards, 2 TD

Top receivers

- CIN – Michael Basnight – 3 receptions, 58 yards
- JAX – Jimmy Smith – 14 receptions, 165 yards

=== Standings ===
AFC Central
	W	L	T	PCT	PF	PA	STK
^{(1)} Jacksonville Jaguars	14	2	0	.875	396	217	W1
^{(4)} Tennessee Titans	13	3	0	.813	392	324	W4
Baltimore Ravens	8	8	0	.500	324	277	L1
Pittsburgh Steelers	6	10	0	.375	317	320	L1
Cincinnati Bengals	4	12	0	.250	283	460	L2
Cleveland Browns	2	14	0	.125	217	437	L6

== Postseason ==
=== Schedule ===
Playoff round	Date	Opponent (seed)	Result	Record	Venue	Attendance
Wild Card	First-round bye					
Divisional	January 15, 2000	Miami Dolphins (6)	W 62–7	1–0	Alltel Stadium	75,173
AFC Championship	January 23, 2000	Tennessee Titans (4)	L 14–33	1–1	Alltel Stadium	75,206

=== Game summaries ===
==== AFC Divisional Playoffs: vs. (6) Miami Dolphins ====
AFC Divisional Game: Miami Dolphins at Jacksonville Jaguars – Game summary

Quarter	1	2	3	4	Total
Dolphins	0	7	0	0	7
Jaguars	24	17	14	7	62

at Alltel Stadium, Jacksonville, Florida

- Date: January 15, 2000
- Game time: 12:35 p.m. EST
- Game weather: 57 °F (13.9 °C), wind 14 miles per hour (23 km/h; 12 kn)
- Game attendance: 75,173
- Referee: Ed Hochuli
- TV announcers (CBS): Verne Lundquist (play-by-play), Dan Dierdorf (color commentator), and Bonnie Bernstein (sideline reporter)
- Recap, Game Book

Game information

First quarter

- JAX – Jimmy Smith 8-yard pass from Mark Brunell (Mike Hollis kick), 10:32. Jaguars 7–0. Drive: 9 plays, 73 yards, 4:28.
- JAX – Mike Hollis 45-yard field goal, 6:19. Jaguars 10–0. Drive: 9 plays, 14 yards, 3:53.
- JAX – Fred Taylor 90-yard run (Mike Hollis kick), 3:46. Jaguars 17–0. Drive: 2 plays, 91 yards, 0:51.
- JAX – Tony Brackens 16-yard fumble return (Mike Hollis kick), 3:21. Jaguars 24–0.

Second quarter

- JAX – Fred Taylor 39-yard pass from Mark Brunell (Mike Hollis kick) (Mike Hollis kick), 14:48. Jaguars 31–0. Drive: 4 plays, 53 yards, 1:47.
- JAX – James Stewart 25-yard run (Mike Hollis kick), 12:05. Jaguars 38–0. Drive: 3 plays, 21 yards, 1:12.
- JAX – Mike Hollis 28-yard field goal, 1:51. Jaguars 41–0. Drive: 5 plays, 20 yards, 1:26.
- MIA – Oronde Gadsden 20-yard pass from Dan Marino (Olindo Mare kick), 0:01. Jaguars 41–7. Drive: 9 plays, 80 yards, 1:50.

Third quarter

- JAX – Jimmy Smith 70-yard pass from Jay Fiedler (Mike Hollis kick), 12:03. Jaguars 48–7. Drive: 3 plays, 78 yards, 1:19.
- JAX – Alvis Whitted 38-yard pass from Jay Fiedler (Mike Hollis kick), 6:19. Jaguars 55–7. Drive: 5 plays, 69 yards, 2:11.

Fourth quarter

- JAX – Chris Howard 5-yard run (Mike Hollis kick), 10:37. Jaguars 62–7. Drive: 1 play, 5 yards, 0:06.

Top passers

- MIA – Dan Marino – 11/25, 95 yards, TD, 2 INT
- JAX – Jay Fiedler – 7/11, 172 yards, 2 TD, INT

Top rushers

- MIA – Stanley Pritchett – 2 rushes, 10 yards
- JAX – Fred Taylor – 18 rushes, 135 yards, TD

Top receivers

- MIA – Oronde Gadsden – 6 receptions, 62 yards, TD
- JAX – Jimmy Smith – 5 receptions, 136 yards, 2 TD

The Jaguars number one defense forced seven Miami turnovers as the Jaguars won in one of the most lopsided games in NFL playoff history. The game was so one-sided the Jaguars were up 24–0 at the end of the first quarter and scored 41 points before the Dolphins were finally able to score at the end of the second quarter. The highlight of the game was Fred Taylor's 90 yard touchdown run in the first quarter. This was the last game for both Miami quarterback Dan Marino and coach Jimmy Johnson.

==== AFC Championship: vs. (4) Tennessee Titans ====
AFC Championship Game: Tennessee Titans at Jacksonville Jaguars – Game summary

Quarter	1	2	3	4	Total
Titans	7	3	16	7	33
Jaguars	7	7	0	0	14

at Alltel Stadium, Jacksonville, Florida

- Date: January 23, 2000
- Game time: 12:35 p.m. EST
- Game weather: 68 °F (20 °C), wind 12 miles per hour (19 km/h; 10 kn)
- Game attendance: 75,206
- Referee: Bernie Kukar
- TV announcers (CBS): Greg Gumbel (play-by-play), Phil Simms (color commentator), Armen Keteyian, and Bonnie Bernstein (sideline reporters)
- Recap, Game Book

Game information

First quarter

- JAX – Kyle Brady 7-yard pass from Mark Brunell (Mike Hollis kick), 11:20. Jaguars 7–0. Drive: 5 plays, 62 yards, 1:59.
- TEN – Yancey Thigpen 9-yard pass from Steve McNair (Al Del Greco kick), 5:30. Tied 7–7. Drive: 9 plays, 51 yards, 5:50.

Second quarter

- JAX – James Stewart 33-yard run (Mike Hollis kick), 4:36. Jaguars 14–7. Drive: 4 plays, 65 yards, 1:58.
- TEN – Al Del Greco 34-yard field goal, 0:20. Jaguars 14–10. Drive: 4 plays, 3 yards, 1:14.

Third quarter

- TEN – Steve McNair 1-yard run (Al Del Greco kick), 9:24. Titans 17–14. Drive: 6 plays, 76 yards, 3:09.
- TEN – Mark Brunell sacked in end zone by Josh Evans, 5:13. Titans 19–14.
- TEN – Derrick Mason 80-yard kick return, 4:56. Titans 26–14.

Fourth quarter

- TEN – Steve McNair 1-yard run (Al Del Greco kick), 6:59. Titans 33–14. Drive: 4 plays, 61 yards, 2:13.

Top passers

- TEN – Steve McNair – 14/23, 112 yards, TD, INT
- JAX – Mark Brunell – 19/38, 226 yards, TD, 2 INT

Top rushers

- TEN – Steve McNair – 9 rushes, 91 yards, 2 TD
- JAX – Fred Taylor – 19 rushes, 110 yards

Top receivers

- TEN – Jackie Harris – 3 receptions, 33 yards
- JAX – Jimmy Smith – 5 receptions, 92 yards

The Jaguars became the first team in NFL history to lose three games to the same team in the same season, with the third loss occurring as the home team (every team until this point had lost a third game on the road). Even though the Titans had four turnovers, the Jaguars had six which proved to be their downfall. The Jaguars failed to score in the second half, in part due to the Titans defense which forced four turnovers after halftime. The game started to fall out of the Jaguars reach when in the third quarter, with the Titans up 17–14, Mark Brunell was sacked in the end zone for a safety. On the next play, Derrick Mason returned the kickoff 80 yards for a touchdown, giving the Titans 9 points in just 17 seconds, putting them up 26–14. The Jaguars never recovered, and thus finished the season 0–3 versus the Titans, but 15–0 versus all remaining opponents.

== Awards and records ==
- Aaron Beasley, Franchise Record, Most Interceptions in One Season, (6)
- Mike Hollis, Franchise Record (tied), Most Field Goals in One Season, (31)
- Jimmy Smith, Franchise Record, Most Receptions in One Season, (116)
- Jimmy Smith, Franchise Record, Most Receiving Yards in One Season, (1,636)
- Jimmy Smith, NFL Leader, Receptions, (116)
