= Pottstown School District =

School district in Pennsylvania, US

Address
- 230 Beech Street Pottstown, Pennsylvania, 19464; United States

District information
- Type: Public
- Grades: PreK–12
- NCES District ID: 4219680

Students and staff
- Students: 3,237
- Teachers: 231.0 (FTE)
- Staff: 255.6 (FTE)
- Student–teacher ratio: 14.01

Other information
- Website: www.pottstownschools.org

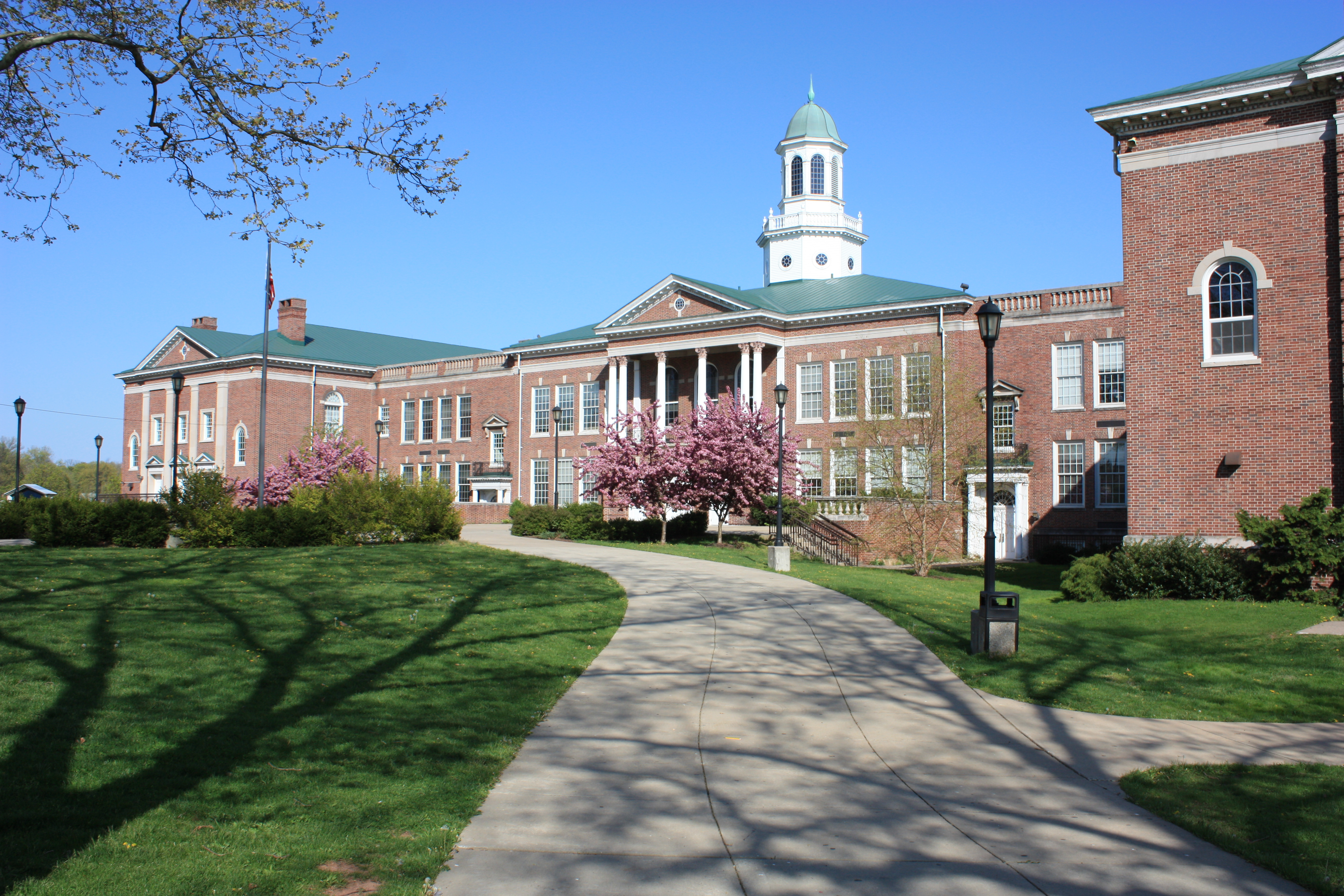
Pottstown Middle School

Pottstown School District is a school district headquartered in Pottstown, Pennsylvania, United States. The district serves the Borough of Pottstown.

== History ==
Pottstown School District is among the oldest in the state of Pennsylvania. The first documentation of a school in Pottstown dates back to the 1700s according to George Wausnock, chairman of the Alumni Outreach Committee. The first school board was formed in 1839 and the first high school class graduation was in 1881. The first elementary school in the district was the now closed Jefferson Elementary School. At its prime in the '60s, Pottstown School District had as many as 8 elementary schools, 2 middle schools and 1 high school. During this time it enrolled about 5,000 students, that number has dropped to about 3,200 in recent years. The district has since closed four of these elementary schools, Jefferson (A current home for the elderly), St. Clair and Washington (Which have since been demolished making way for housing) as well as Edgewood, which was closed due to district renovation and expansion of district schools.

== Schools ==
Elementary schools in the district include Elizabeth B. Barth, Franklin, Lincoln, and Rupert. Pottstown Middle School and Pottstown High School are the secondary schools of the district. (Edgewood Elementary School was closed at the end of school year 2013 due to a reorganization of the district)

== School renovations ==
Pottstown School District saw a lot of remodeling starting in the 2012–13 school year. In this year, Barth Elementary school was being redone, the fifth grade class was moved to Franklin Elementary School since the renovations were headquartered mainly in and around the fifth grade classrooms. When Edgewood Elementary closed after the 2012-2013 school year, it housed all students from Rupert Elementary while it was being remodeled. During this time, the school was renamed Rupert until the students returned to the original building in the East End.

== School uniforms ==
Starting in fall 2008 the district required students from Kindergarten through grade 8 to wear school uniforms.

In the beginning of the school year in 2009, the high school was included in the policy.

As of July 2018, the dress codes had been removed for all levels of schools.

== Notable alumni ==
- Bobby Shantz
- Aaron Beasley
- Rian Wallace

== Administration ==
As of 2024 the superintendent of schools is Stephen Rodriguez, and the board of education consists of:

- Katina Bearden (president)
- Steve Kline (vice-president)
- Maureen Oakley (secretary)
- Laura Johnson (treasurer)
