= Aaron Beasley =

American football player (born 1973)

No. 21, 37
- Position: Cornerback

Personal information
- Born: July 7, 1973 (age 53); Pottstown, Pennsylvania, U.S.
- Listed height: 6 ft 0 in (1.83 m)
- Listed weight: 205 lb (93 kg)

Career information
- High school: Pottstown; Valley Forge Military Academy (Wayne, Pennsylvania)
- College: West Virginia
- NFL draft: 1996: 3rd round, 63rd overall pick

Career history
- Jacksonville Jaguars (1996–2001); New York Jets (2002–2003); Atlanta Falcons (2004)

Awards and highlights
- Consensus All-American (1995); Second-team All-American (1994); First-team All-Big East (1995); West Virginia University Sports Hall of Fame

Career NFL statistics
- Tackles: 431
- Sacks: 8.5
- Forced fumbles: 10
- Fumble recoveries: 4
- Interceptions: 24
- Defensive touchdowns: 4
- Stats at Pro Football Reference

Aaron Bruce Beasley (born July 7, 1973) is an American former professional football player who was a cornerback for nine seasons in the National Football League (NFL). He played college football for the West Virginia Mountaineers, earning consensus All-American honors in 1995. He was selected in the third round of the 1996 NFL draft, and played professionally for the Jacksonville Jaguars, New York Jets and Atlanta Falcons of the NFL.

== Early life ==
Beasley was born in Pottstown, Pennsylvania. He graduated from Pottstown Senior High School in 1991, and attended Valley Forge Military Academy in Wayne, Pennsylvania, for a fifth preparatory year.

== College career ==
Beasley attended West Virginia University, where he was a three-year starter for the West Virginia Mountaineers football team at cornerback. In the 1994 season, Beasley led the nation with ten interceptions—also a WVU single-season record, had an interception in six consecutive games during the season. He also had a career-high three interceptions against the Virginia Tech Hokies. He finished 1994 with 57 tackles, a then school-record eighteen deflected passes, and three tackles for a loss. In 1995, Beasley was recognized as a consensus first-team All-American and was a Jim Thorpe Award semifinalist. He was also a first-team All-Big East Conference selection and semifinalist for the Big East Defensive Player of the Year Award. He finished his college career with nineteen interceptions (second most in Mountaineers history), three of which he returned for touchdowns, and 143 tackles.

Beasley was inducted into the West Virginia University Sports Hall of Fame in 2009

== Professional career ==
The Jacksonville Jaguars selected Beasley in the third round (63rd pick overall) of the 1996 NFL draft. He played for the Jaguars from 1996 to 2001. His 1999 season for the Jaguars was his most impressive statistically, when he started all sixteen regular season games and amassed six interceptions, 200 interception return yards, and two interceptions for touchdowns, one of which against the San Francisco 49ers set the team record for the longest interception return at 93 yards. He also played for the New York Jets from 2002 to 2003 and the Atlanta Falcons in 2004. In his nine-season NFL career, he played in 121 games (105 as a starter) and compiled 423 tackles, 24 interceptions, ten forced fumbles and 8.5 quarterback sacks.Now he is a head coach at Duval Charter in Jacksonville, FL.

== NFL career statistics ==
Legend
	Led the league
**Bold**	Career high

=== Regular season ===
Year	Team	Games		Tackles				Interceptions				Fumbles			
Year	Team	GP	GS	Comb	Solo	Ast	Sck	Int	Yds	TD	Lng	FF	FR	Yds	TD
1996	JAX	9	7	29	20	9	1.0	1	0	0	0	1	0	0	0
1997	JAX	9	7	25	25	0	0.0	1	5	0	5	1	0	0	0
1998	JAX	16	15	**67**	58	9	0.0	3	35	0	34	**2**	**1**	**120**	**1**
1999	JAX	16	16	66	57	9	1.5	**6**	**200**	**2**	**93**	**2**	0	0	0
2000	JAX	14	14	53	46	7	**5.0**	1	39	0	39	1	**1**	0	0
2001	JAX	12	12	39	36	3	0.0	3	0	0	0	0	**1**	40	**1**
2002	NYJ	15	15	**67**	**60**	7	0.0	2	29	0	24	0	0	0	0
2003	NYJ	16	16	61	46	**15**	0.0	3	64	0	39	1	**1**	0	0
2004	ATL	14	3	24	21	3	1.0	4	115	0	85	**2**	0	0	0
Career		121	105	431	369	62	8.5	24	487	2	93	10	4	160	2

=== Playoffs ===
Year	Team	Games		Tackles				Interceptions				Fumbles			
Year	Team	GP	GS	Comb	Solo	Ast	Sck	Int	Yds	TD	Lng	FF	FR	Yds	TD
1996	JAX	3	2	**12**	**12**	0	0.0	1	**15**	0	**15**	0	**1**	0	0
1997	JAX	1	0	3	3	0	0.0	0	0	0	0	0	0	0	0
1998	JAX	2	2	4	3	**1**	0.0	0	0	0	0	0	**1**	0	0
1999	JAX	2	2	8	8	0	0.0	**2**	5	0	5	0	0	0	0
2002	NYJ	2	2	8	7	**1**	0.0	0	0	0	0	0	0	0	0
2004	ATL	2	0	0	0	0	0.0	0	0	0	0	0	0	0	0
Career		12	8	35	33	2	0.0	3	20	0	15	0	2	0	0
