= Chad Levitt =

American football player (born 1975)

No. 31
- Position: Running back

Personal information
- Born: November 21, 1975 (age 50); Melrose Park, Pennsylvania, U.S.
- Listed height: 6 ft 1 in (1.85 m)
- Listed weight: 231 lb (105 kg)

Career information
- High school: Cheltenham (Wyncote, Pennsylvania)
- College: Cornell
- NFL draft: 1997: 4th round, 123rd overall pick

Career history
- Oakland Raiders (1997); St. Louis Rams (1999); Chicago Bears (2000)*
- * Offseason or practice squad member only

Career NFL statistics
- Rushing yards: 3
- Rushing average: 1.5
- Receptions: 2
- Receiving yards: 24
- Stats at Pro Football Reference

Chad Aaron Levitt (born November 21, 1975) is an American former NFL football player.

He is Jewish, was born in Melrose Park, Pennsylvania, is 6'1", and had a playing weight of 231 pounds. He played high school football, and wrestled and competed in track and field, for Cheltenham High School, from which he graduated in 1993.

In football his 1,601 yards (1,464 m) in his senior year set a new Cheltenham High School single season rushing record, and he was First-team and Outstanding Player of Suburban One Liberty League, Academic All-League, and a Montgomery County All Star. In wrestling, he was a Suburban One All-Star. In shot put and in the 4x100 relay, he was First-team All-League. He was awarded the 1993 B'nai B'rith Sports Lodge Ted Domsky Memorial Scholar-Athlete Award.

Levitt played college football for Cornell University, as a running back. He was three-time All-Ivy, and an Associated Press All-American selection as a senior. He set a Cornell and Ivy League career record for most rushing attempts (922), and a Cornell-best record for 100-yard (91 m) rushing games in a career (24). In 1996, he rushed for 1,435 yards (1,312 m) and was the ECAC Division I-AA Player of the Year, and the Ivy League Player of the Year.

He was drafted by the Oakland Raiders in the fourth round of the 1997 NFL draft. He played two seasons in the National Football League. In 1999, he played for the St. Louis Rams, and in 1997 for the Oakland Raiders.

In 1997, he was named the Marty Glickman Outstanding Jewish Scholastic (college) Athlete of the Year by US Jewish Sports Hall of Fame. In 2008, he was inducted into the Philadelphia Jewish Sports Hall of Fame. He is also a member of the Cornell Athletic Hall of Fame.
