= Charles H. Ewing =

American engineer and businessman (1866–1935)

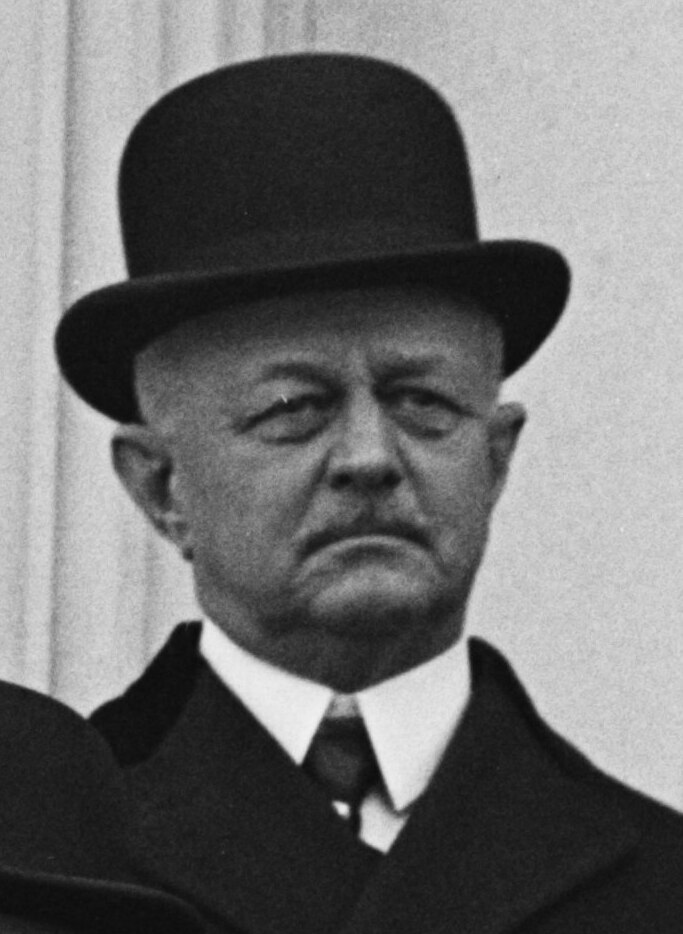
- Ewing in 1925
- Born: Charles Henry Ewing; May 28, 1866; Pottstown, Pennsylvania, U.S.
- Died: December 8, 1935 (aged 69); Melrose Park, Pennsylvania, U.S.
- Resting place: Mount Zion Cemetery; Pottstown, Pennsylvania, U.S.
- Occupations: Engineer; railroad executive
- Years active: 1883–1935
- Known for: president of the Reading Company and Central Railroad of New Jersey
- Spouse: Sarah I. Newlin (m. 1892)
- Children: 1

Charles Henry Ewing (May 28, 1866 – December 8, 1935) was an American engineer and businessman who was president of the Reading Company and the Central Railroad of New Jersey.

== Early life ==
Charles Henry Ewing was born on May 28, 1866, in Pottstown, Pennsylvania, to Maria (née Potts) and James S. Ewing. His father was a manufacturer in the iron business. He was educated in Pottstown Senior High School and was privately tutored in civil engineering.

== Career ==
In 1883, Ewing began a career as a rodman for the Philadelphia and Reading Railway Company. He was later promoted to assistant engineer and supervisor. In 1892, he was made division engineer. He was then chief engineer on the Central New England Railway. In 1902, he returned to the Philadelphia and Reading Railway Company as a division engineer. On June 1, 1905, he became engineer on maintenance of way. In 1910, he became superintendent on the Atlantic City Railroad. On January 1, 1913, he became general superintendent of the Philadelphia and Reading Railway Company. On March 16, 1916, he was appointed as general manager and in December 1917, he was promoted to vice president.

During World War I, Ewing was appointed as federal manager of the Philadelphia and Reading Railway Company, the Reading Company, the Central Railroad of New Jersey, and the Staten Island Rapid Transit Company. Following the war, he was vice president of the Philadelphia and Reading Railway Company until January 1, 1924. He then became vice president of the Reading Company. In 1921, he was vice president of the line when disastrous head-on collision near Bryn Athyn, Pennsylvania, on the Newtown branch of the railroad, on December 5, caused the deaths of 27 people, including passengers, crew, and rescuers. Although an investigation had just begun (which would find error in company policies as well as operational errors on that day), Ewing issued a statement the following day placing blame on the crew of the northbound train, which had ignored an order to take a siding to allow another train to pass. Ewing declared, "We are wholly at a loss to account for this gross violation of the order and the rules, except that it was an unexplained failure of the human agency." On April 28, 1932, he became president of the Reading Company, succeeding Agnew T. Dice. He remained as president until 1935. On June 22, 1933, he became president of the Central Railroad of New Jersey.

Ewing was vice president of the Union League, on the board of managers of the Franklin Institute, a member of the general committee in the transportation division of the American Engineering Railway Association. He was a member of the executive committee of the Bureau of Information and the Bureau of Explosives of the Eastern Railways.

== Personal life ==
Ewing married Sarah "Sallie" I. Newlin of Pottstown on November 24, 1892. They had a son, George N. He was a member of the Oak Lane Methodist Episcopal Church. He was a member of the Huntingdon Valley Country Club, the Seaview Golf Club, the Engineers Club of Philadelphia, the Marine Club, and the Eastern Railroad Presidents' Conference.

Ewing died of esophageal cancer and pneumonia on December 8, 1935, at his Seatonhurst home on Sharpless Avenue in Melrose Park, Cheltenham Township, Pennsylvania. He was buried at Mount Zion Cemetery in Pottstown.
