= Melrose Park, Pennsylvania =

Unincorporated community in Pennsylvania, US

Melrose Park
- Unincorporated community Neighborhood of Cheltenham Township
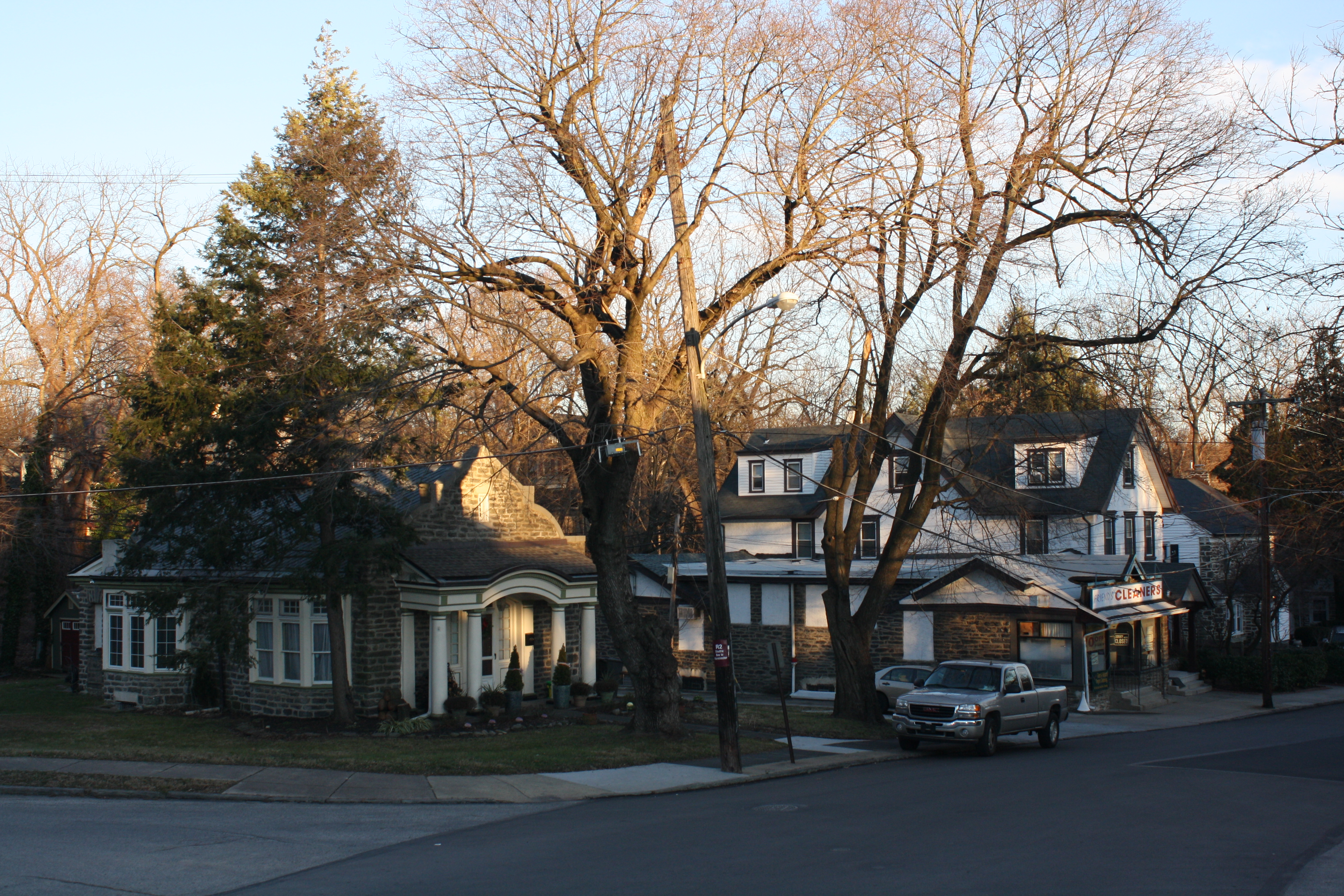
- Valley Road in Melrose Park, January 2013

- Location of Melrose Park in Pennsylvania Melrose Park (the United States)
- Coordinates: 40°03′42″N 75°07′55″W
- Country: United States
- State: Pennsylvania
- County: Montgomery
- Township: Cheltenham
- Commissioner: Daniel B. Norris

Area
  - Total: 0.66 sq mi (1.71 km^{2})
- Elevation: 203 ft (62 m)

Population (2010)
  - Total: 3,006
  - Density: 4,554.5/sq mi (1,758.52/km^{2})
- Time zone: UTC-5 (EST)
  - Summer (DST): UTC-4 (EDT)
- Area codes: 215, 267 and 445

Melrose Park is an unincorporated section of Cheltenham Township on the Philadelphia city line in Montgomery County, Pennsylvania, It is bordered to the south by Cheltenham Avenue, to the west by Old York Road, to the east by New Second Street and to the north by Ashbourne Road.

SEPTA provides public transportation to Melrose Park via the Melrose Park railroad station and SEPTA bus routes 28, 55, and 70.

Melrose Park is represented by Madeleine Dean in the 4th Congressional District. It is a close-in suburb outside of Philadelphia.

== Demographics ==
Historical population
Census	Pop.	Note	%±

The United States Census Bureau defined Melrose Park as a census designated place (CDP) in 2023.

== Gratz College ==
Melrose Park had been home to Gratz College, the oldest independent institution of Jewish learning in the United States. In March 2025, Gratz announced they would be leaving their Melrose Park campus for new facilities in Jenkintown, Pennsylvania.

== Notable people ==
- Charles H. Ewing (1866–1935), railroad executive
- Chad Levitt, professional football player
- Edgar Lee Masters, poet, biographer, attorney

== Gallery ==
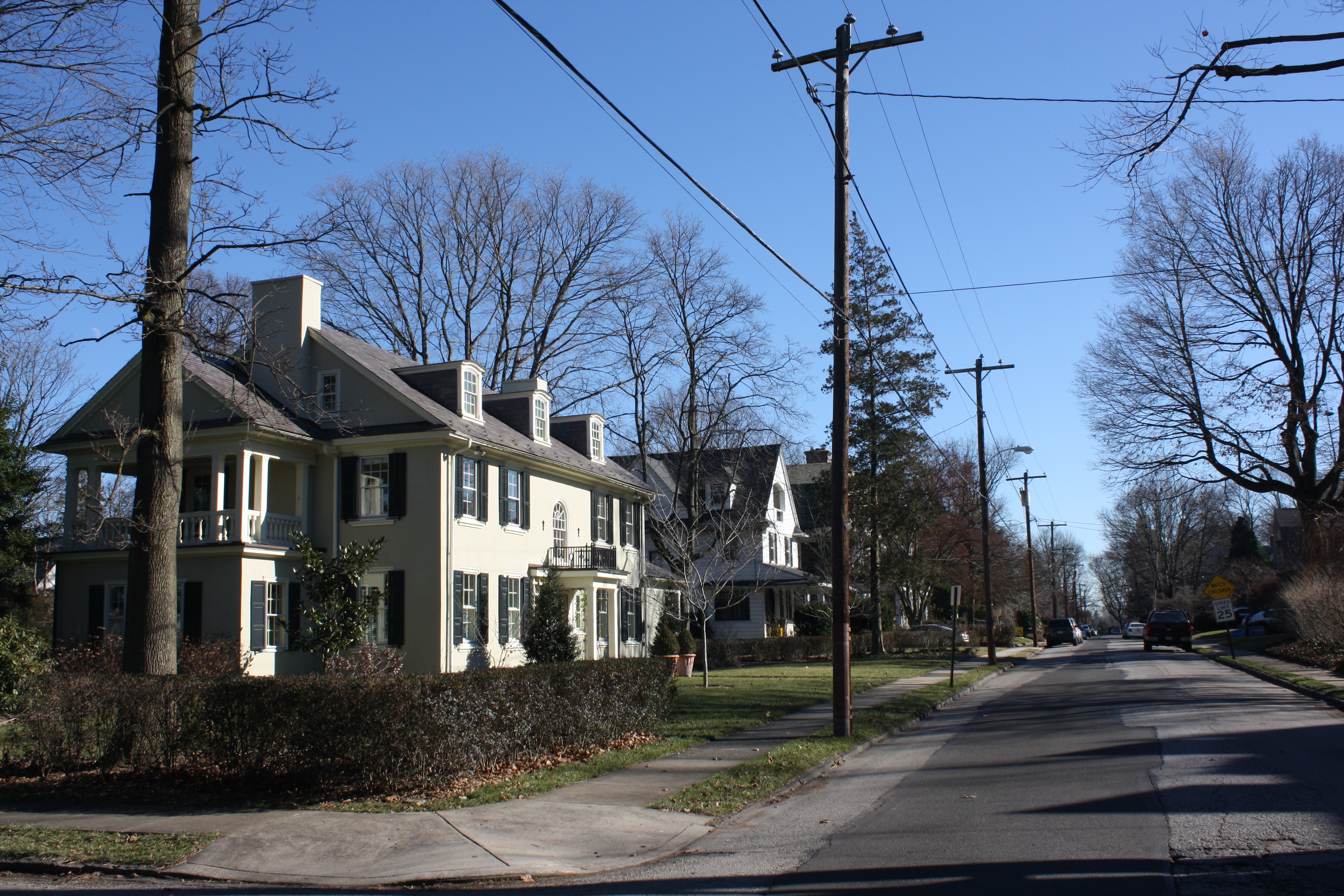
Melrose Avenue.

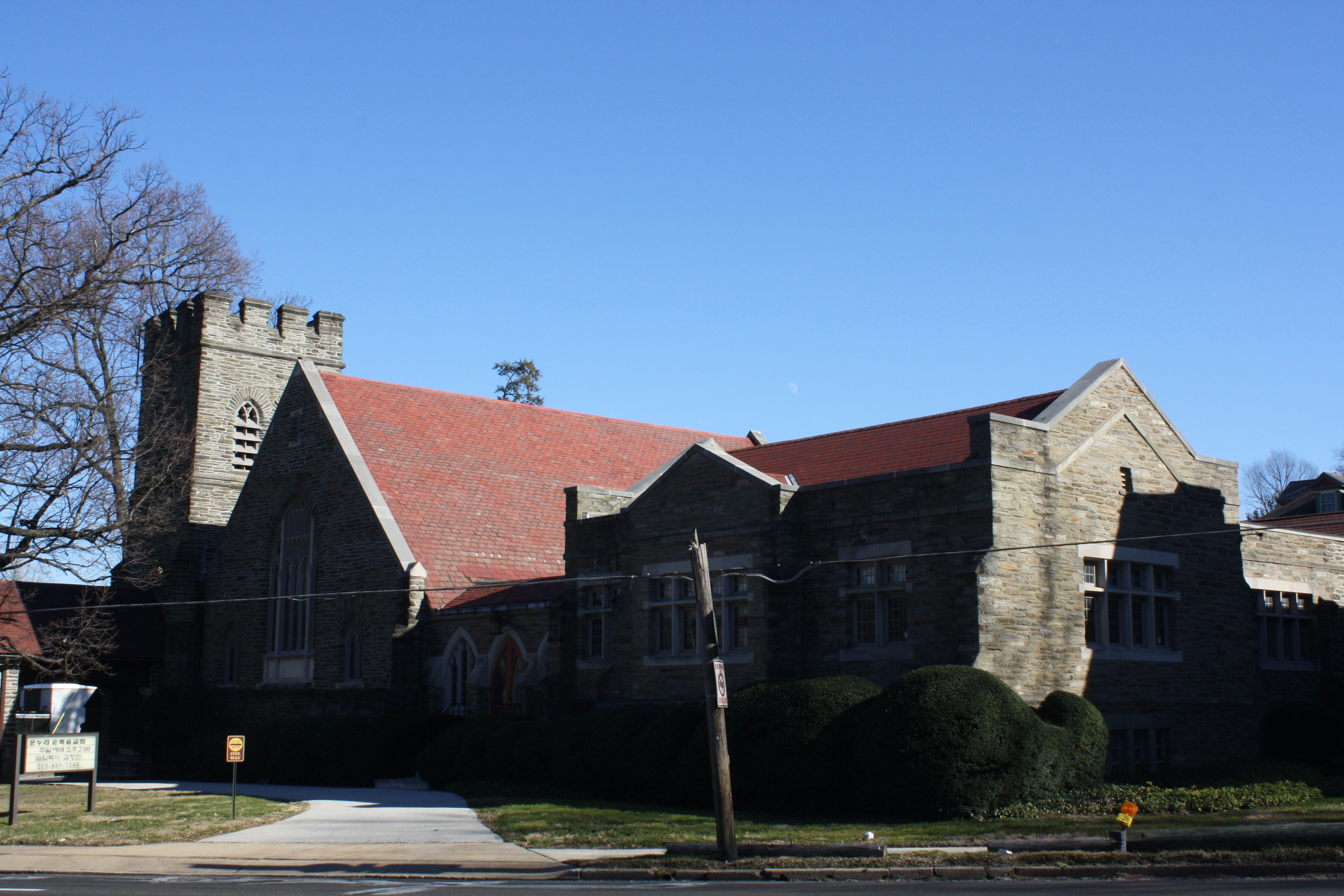
St. John's Lutheran Church in Melrose Park.

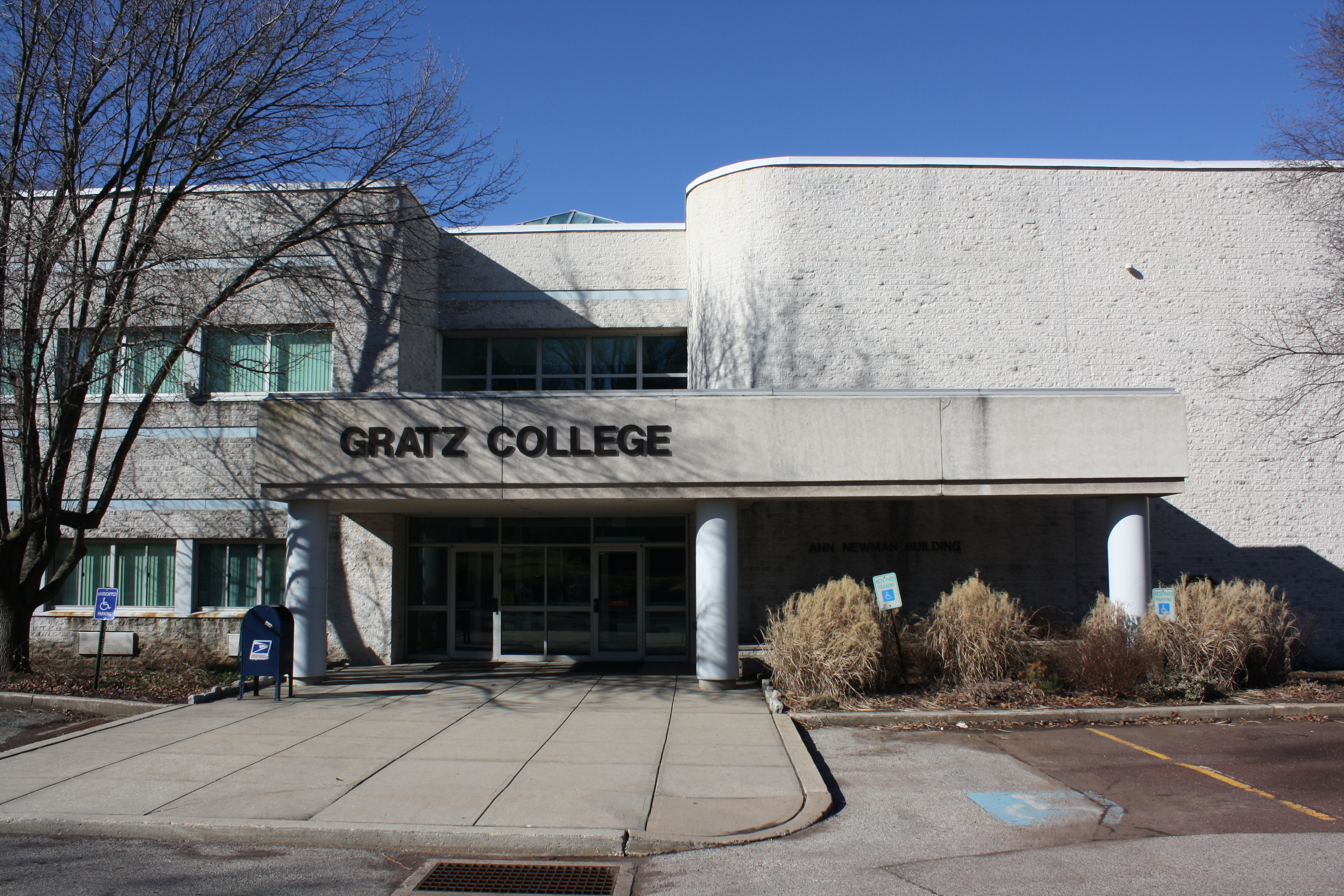
Gratz College.

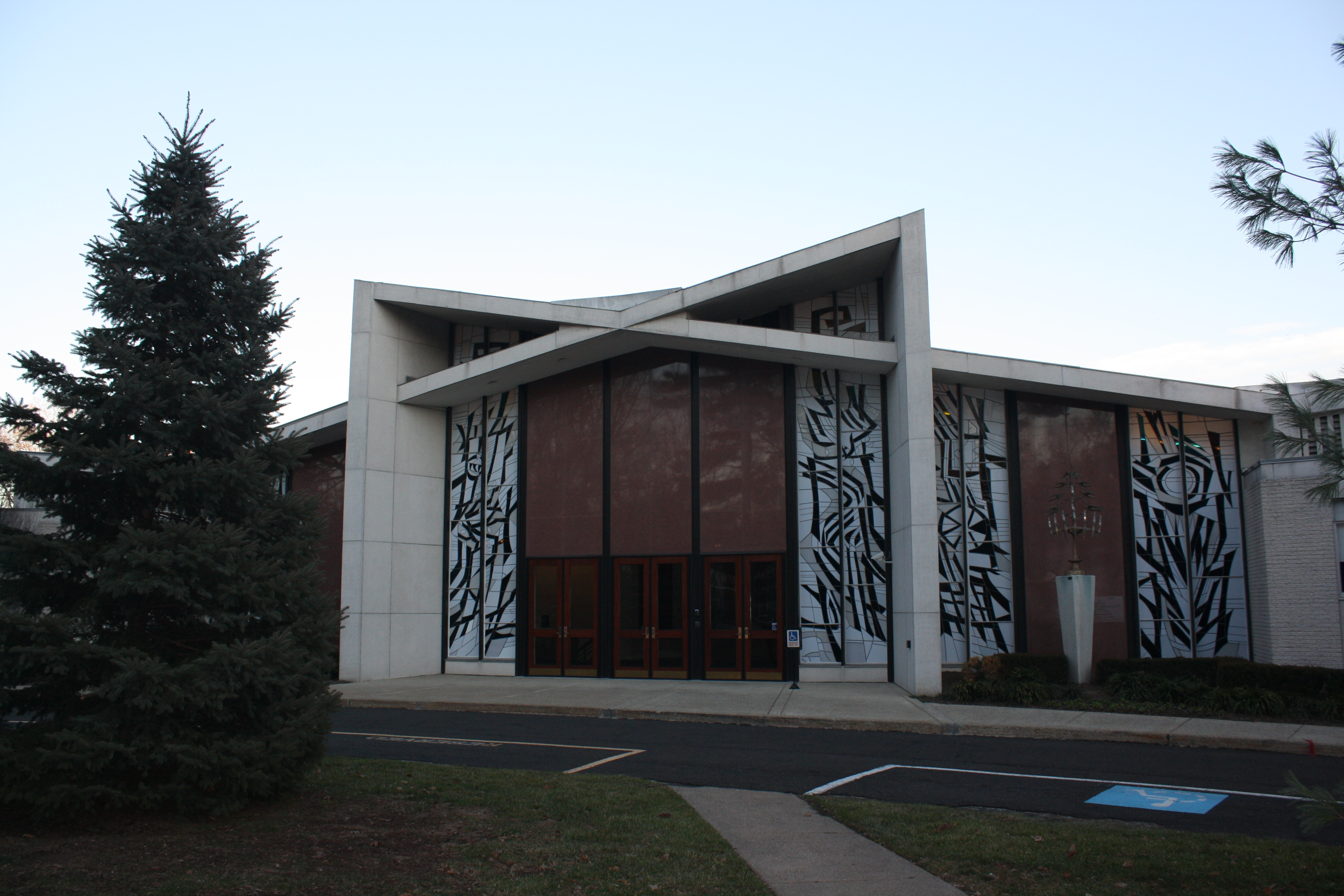
Congregation Adath Jeshurun.

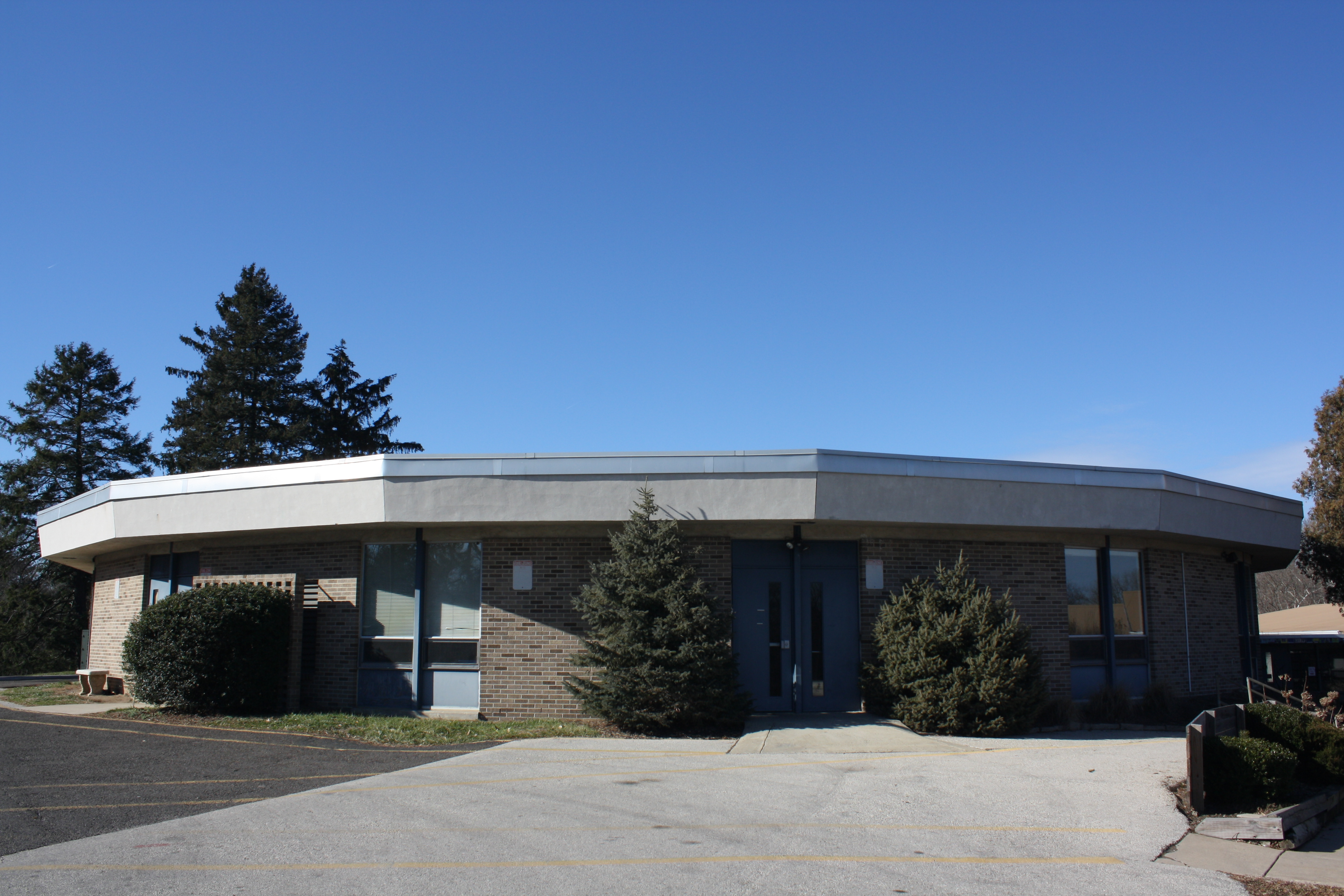
Perelman Jewish Day School.
