= Chris White (defensive lineman) =

American football player (born 1976)

No. 96, 69, 94
- Position: Defensive lineman

Personal information
- Born: September 28, 1976 (age 50); Shreveport, Louisiana, U.S.
- Listed height: 6 ft 3 in (1.91 m)
- Listed weight: 285 lb (129 kg)

Career information
- High school: Captain Shreve (Shreveport)
- College: UNLV (1994); Southern (1996–1998)
- NFL draft: 1999: 7th round, 246th overall pick

Career history
- Jacksonville Jaguars (1999–2000)*; Atlanta Falcons (2000); Dallas Cowboys (2000–2001)*; Saskatchewan Roughriders (2002–2003); Grand Rapids Rampage (2005)
- * Offseason or practice squad member only

Awards and highlights
- 2× Black college national champion (1997, 1998)

Career NFL statistics
- Games played: 5
- Stats at Pro Football Reference

Career CFL statistics
- Games played: 3
- Tackles: 5
- Stats at CFL.ca
- Stats at ArenaFan.com

Christopher James White (born September 28, 1976) is an American former professional football defensive lineman who played in the National Football League (NFL) for the Jacksonville Jaguars, Atlanta Falcons and Dallas Cowboys. He played college football for the UNLV Rebels and Southern Jaguars. White also had stints in the Canadian Football League (CFL) with the Saskatchewan Roughriders and the Arena Football League (AFL) with the Grand Rapids Rampage.

== Early life ==
White was born on September 28, 1976, in Shreveport, Louisiana. He attended Captain Shreve High School in Shreveport.

== College career ==
White played college football for the UNLV Rebels in 1994 and Southern Jaguars from 1996 to 1998. Over three seasons at Southern he had 88 tackles and had four sacks as a senior.

== Professional career ==
=== Jacksonville Jaguars ===
White was selected in the seventh round, with the 246th overall selection, by the Jacksonville Jaguars in the 1999 NFL draft. On May 25, he officially signed with the team. On September 5, White was waived and signed to the practice squad the following day. On November 29, he was elevated to the active roster. On August 24, 2000, White was waived by the team.

=== Atlanta Falcons ===
On August 24, 2000, the Atlanta Falcons claimed White off waivers. On August 28, he was released and signed to the practice squad. On September 19, White was elevated to the active roster. He played in five games for the Falcons before he was moved to the practice squad on November 16. On December 1, White was released.

=== Dallas Cowboys ===
On December 14, 2000, White was signed to the practice squad of the Dallas Cowboys. On August 1, 2001, he was released by the team.

=== Saskatchewan Roughriders ===
On May 27, 2002, White was signed by the Saskatchewan Roughriders of the Canadian Football League (CFL). He played in three games and had five tackles. On June 14, 2003, White was released.

=== Grand Rapids Rampage ===
On December 5, 2004, White was signed by the Grand Rapids Rampage of the Arena Football League (AFL). In two games, he had one reception for five yards and three tackles. On March 4, 2005, White was placed on re-callable waivers.
