= Pottstown Senior High School =

Location
- 750 N Washington St, Pottstown, PA 19464; United States
- Coordinates: 40.2534°N 75.6347°W

Information
- Type: Public high school
- Motto: "Prepare each student, by name, for success at every level"
- School district: Pottstown School District
- Superintendent: Stepehen Rodriguez
- Principal: Christian D'Annibale
- Teaching staff: 65.25 (FTE)
- Grades: 9-12
- Enrollment: 921 (2023–2024)
- Student to teacher ratio: 14.11
- Colors: Navy and white
- Team name: Trojans
- Website: www.pottstownschools.org/pottstownhighschool_home.aspx

Pottstown Senior High School is a high school in Pottstown, Pennsylvania, United States. It is part of the Pottstown School District. The school's mascot is a Trojan. The students go by the name of the "Trojans". The school colors are navy blue and white.

== Extracurriculars ==
=== Student organizations ===
- Art Club
- Stage Crew
- Key Club
- Spanish Club
- Student Ambassadors
- Peer Mediation

=== Musical organizations ===
- Marching Band
- Show Choir Bell Choir
- Mixed Ensemble
- Tri-County Honors Choir

=== Service clubs and organizations ===
- HOSA (Health Occupations Society of America)
- FCCLA (Family Career and Community Leaders of America)
- DECA (An Association of Marketing Students)
- Student Government

=== Skills USA achievement organizations ===
- National Honor Society
- National Technical Honor Society
- Reading Olympics

=== Literary organizations ===
- Troiad Yearbook

== Athletics ==
Pottstown Senior High School competes in the Pioneer Athletic League (PAC-10).

Sports offered are:

=== Fall sports ===
- Football
- Field Hockey
- Girls’ tennis
- Soccer (boys' and girls')
- Golf
- Cross country
- Cheerleading
- Girls Volleyball

=== Winter sports ===
- Basketball (boys' and girls')
- Cheerleading
- Wrestling

=== Spring sports ===
- Baseball
- Softball
- Lacrosse
- Boys’ Tennis
- Track (boys’ and Girls’)

== Notable alumni ==
- Charles H. Ewing (1866–1935), railroad executive
- Bobby Shantz, baseball player

== See also ==
- Pottstown School District
- Pottsgrove High School
