= Jason Craft =

American football player (born 1976)

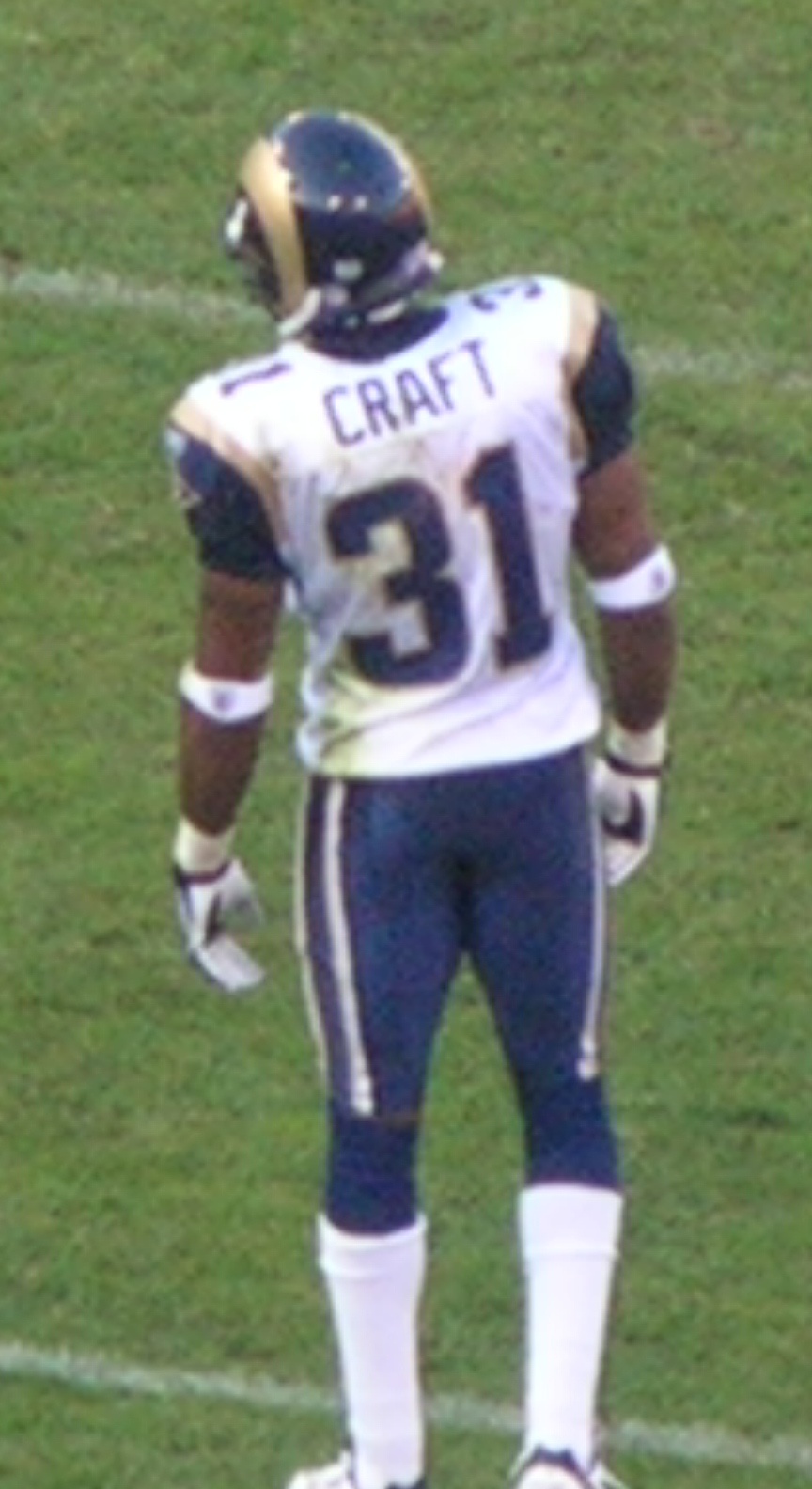
- Craft with the St. Louis Rams in 2008

No. 29, 21, 31
- Position: Cornerback

Personal information
- Born: February 13, 1976 (age 50); Denver, Colorado, U.S.
- Listed height: 5 ft 10 in (1.78 m)
- Listed weight: 187 lb (85 kg)

Career information
- College: Colorado State
- NFL draft: 1999: 5th round, 160th overall pick

Career history
- Jacksonville Jaguars (1999–2003); New Orleans Saints (2004–2008); St. Louis Rams (2008)

Career NFL statistics
- Total tackles: 428
- Sacks: 4
- Forced fumbles: 8
- Pass deflections: 58
- Interceptions: 14
- Defensive touchdowns: 1
- Stats at Pro Football Reference

Jason Donell Andre Craft (born February 13, 1976) is an American former professional football player who was a cornerback in the National Football League (NFL). He was selected by the Jacksonville Jaguars in the fifth round of the 1999 NFL draft. He played college football for the Colorado State Rams.

== Early life ==
Craft was born in Denver, Colorado and attended East High School in Denver, Colorado and was a letterman in football, basketball, and track. In football, he was a two-time All-City selection and as a senior, he helped lead his team to an 8 win - 2 loss record and the Denver Prep League Title.

== College career ==
Craft joined the Colorado State Rams in 1995 as a walk-on from Community College of Denver. He played for the team from 1997 to 1998 starting 12 of 21 games, finishing with 53 tackles and four interceptions. He started every game at cornerback as a senior in 1998 and recorded 45 tackles, one forced fumble, one fumble recovery, four interceptions and four passes defensed. He appeared in nine games as a reserve and on special teams in 1997.

== Professional career ==
=== Jacksonville Jaguars ===
Craft was selected by the Jacksonville Jaguars in the fifth round of the 1999 NFL draft with the 160th overall pick. For the first couple of years he was used mostly on special teams. In 2002, he became a full-time starter. He played five seasons in Jacksonville, intercepting seven passes and making 194 tackles. His tenure in Jacksonville is memorable for an occasion on which he discovered the secret to Peyton Manning's audibles at the line, and then inexplicably told the Colts what he had learned; Craft's foolish decision to brag led to an easy Colts' touchdown.

=== New Orleans Saints ===
On April 8, 2004, the Jaguars traded Craft to the New Orleans Saints for a fifth round pick in the 2004 NFL draft (Chris Thompson). While in New Orleans most of his action was on special teams, as he has only started 14 games at cornerback. In 2004, he played in 14 games at cornerback and contributed on special teams in his first season with New Orleans and finished season with 17 tackles, four passes defensed and 10 special teams tackles. In 2005, he played in all 16 games with four starts at right cornerback and led the Saints with three interceptions. He posted 36 tackles, three interceptions, two forced fumbles, four passes defensed and seven special teams stops. Played in all 16 games with five starts and produced 52 tackles, 10 passes defensed and an interception. Craft started four of 16 games played and totaled 63 tackles, two interceptions and eight passes defensed. In 2008 Craft played in two games with the Saints before being released on September 16, 2008.

=== St.Louis Rams ===
Craft signed with the St. Louis Rams on September 24, 2008. Craft played mostly as the Rams nickelback in 2008. He made two starts, one as a left cornerback and the other as a nickelback when the Rams open the game in a 5 defensive back formation. He made 52 tackles, three sacks, 1 interception, 5 passes defensed, one forced fumble and three fumbles recovered. The Rams cut Craft in April 2009 and he is currently a free agent.

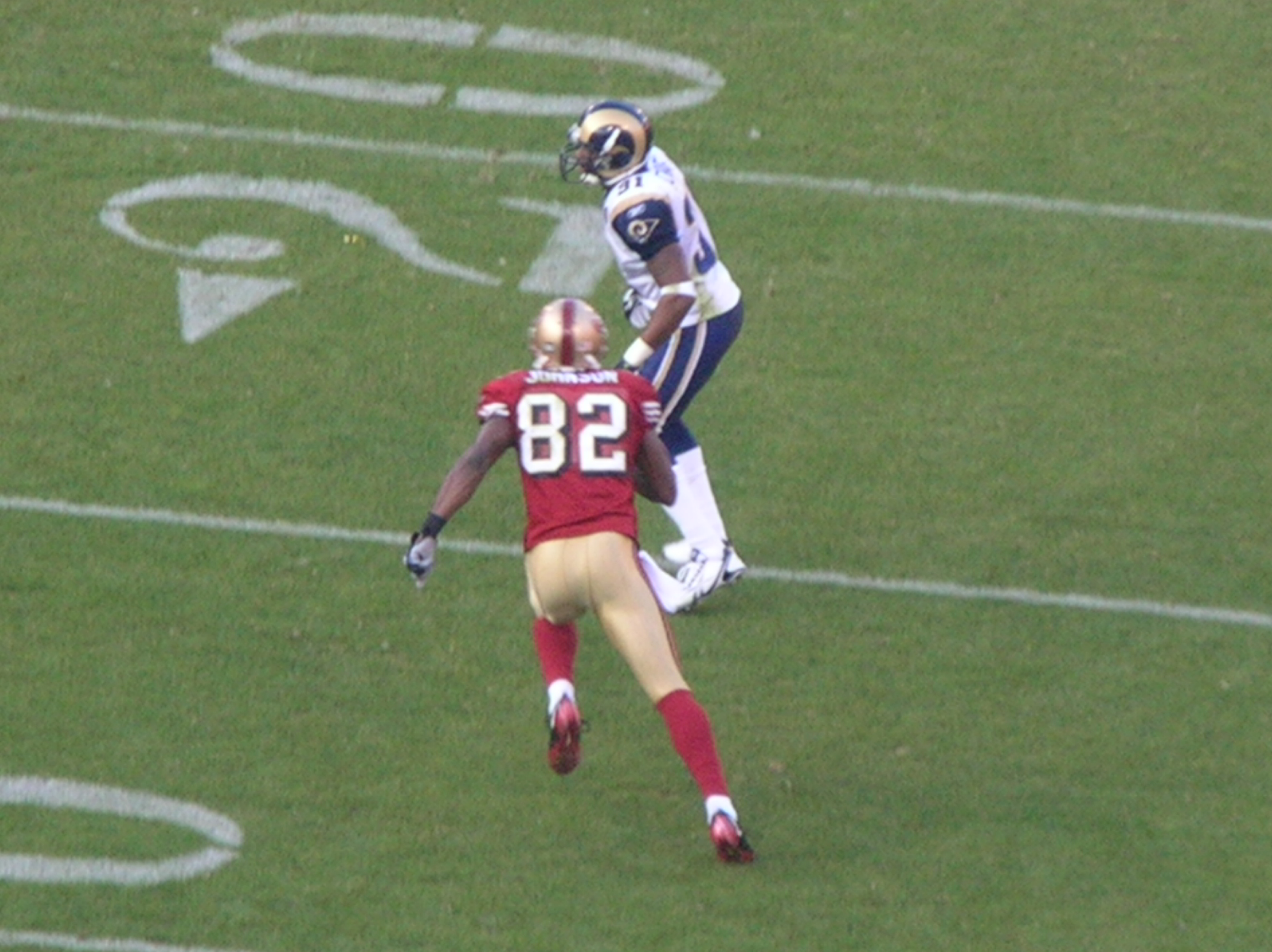
Craft covers San Francisco 49ers wide receiver Bryant Johnson during a game on November 16, 2008.
