= Daniel Sanders =

Daniel Sanders may refer to:

- Daniel Sanders (lexicographer) (1819–1897), German lexicographer of Jewish parentage
- Daniel Sanders (American football) (born 1986), American football center
- Daniel Sanders (motorcyclist) (born 1994), Australian rally bike rider
- Daniel P. Sanders, graph theorist
- Daniel J. Sanders (1847–1907), clergyman, newspaper publisher, and educator
- Danny Sanders (born 1955), American gridiron football player
