= 2010 Baltimore Ravens season =

NFL team season

- Owner: Steve Bisciotti
- General manager: Ozzie Newsome
- Head coach: John Harbaugh
- Offensive coordinator: Cam Cameron
- Defensive coordinator: Greg Mattison
- Home stadium: M&T Bank Stadium

Results
- Record: 12–4
- Division place: 2nd AFC North
- Playoffs: Won Wild Card Playoffs (at Chiefs) 30–7; Lost Divisional Playoffs (at Steelers) 24–31
- All-Pros: DT Haloti Ngata (1st team); S Ed Reed (1st team); K Billy Cundiff (1st team); MLB Ray Lewis (2nd team)
- Pro Bowlers: DT Haloti Ngata; OLB Terrell Suggs; MLB Ray Lewis; FS Ed Reed; K Billy Cundiff

Uniform
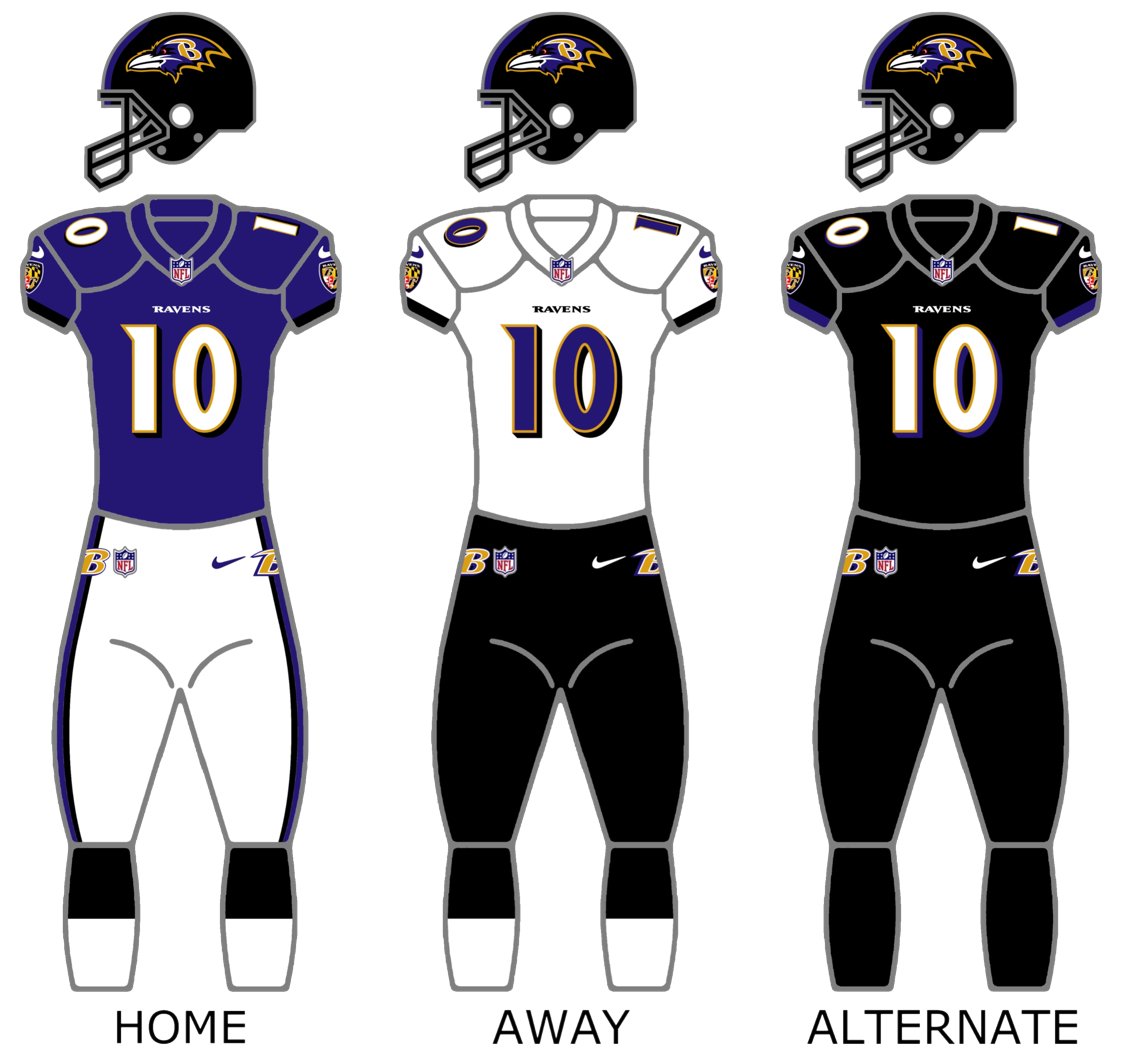

The 2010 season was the Baltimore Ravens' 15th in the National Football League (NFL), their 13th playing home games at M&T Bank Stadium and their third under head coach John Harbaugh. The franchise improved on their 9–7 record from the previous season, with a 12–4 record, tying them for first place in the AFC North; however, they had to settle for a wild card berth for the third straight year since the Pittsburgh Steelers owned the tiebreaker for divisional record. As the AFC's #5 seed, the Ravens travelled to the #4 seeded Kansas City Chiefs, defeating them 30–7 in the wild card round to advance. The following week, however, the Ravens lost to their division rival and eventual AFC champion Steelers in the Divisional playoffs despite having a 21–7 lead at halftime.

== Off-season ==
Because the Ravens made an appearance in the 2009–10 playoffs, they will be able to sign any player with a salary of $4,925,000 or more. They also may sign an unlimited number of players with a first-year salary of no more than $3,275,000, who will be restricted to an annual increase of a maximum 30 percent in the following years. However, along with the other final eight contenders from the playoffs, the Ravens will be restricted to signing new players until at least one of their free agents is signed to another franchise.

=== Roster signings ===
All signings were to the active roster, except where otherwise noted.

Pos.	Player	Date	Notes
TE	Davon Drew	January 19, 2010	
WR	Eron Riley	January 19, 2010	
WR	Maurice Price	January 19, 2010	
DE	Willie VanDeSteeg	January 19, 2010	
G	Bryan Mattison	January 19, 2010	
T	Stefan Rodgers	January 19, 2010	
T	Joe Reitz	January 19, 2010	
FB	Charles Ali	January 21, 2010	
C	Digger Bujnoch	January 21, 2010	
WR	Chris Hannon	January 21, 2010	
C	Daniel Sanders	January 21, 2010	
WR	Donté Stallworth	February 17, 2010	Signed to a one-year contract
WR	Anquan Boldin	March 5, 2010	Traded from the Arizona Cardinals for a third and fourth round draft pick in the 2010 NFL draft
WR	Derrick Mason	March 10, 2010	Signed to a two-year contract
DT	Cory Redding	March 22, 2010	Signed to a two-year contract
K	Shayne Graham	June 3, 2010	Signed to a one-year contract
DT	Arthur Jones	June 21, 2010	Signed to a three-year contract
TE	Dennis Pitta	June 21, 2010	Signed to a three-year contract
S	Ken Hamlin	June 22, 2010	Signed to a one-year contract
QB	Marc Bulger	June 23, 2010	Signed to a one-year contract
CB	Walt Harris	June 24, 2010	Signed to a one-year contract
WR	David Reed	June 24, 2010	Signed to a three-year contract
OT	Ramon Harewood	June 28, 2010	Signed to a three-year contract
DT	Terrence Cody	July 26, 2010	Signed to a four-year contract
CB	Josh Wilson	August 31, 2010	Traded from the Seattle Seahawks for a conditional fifth round draft pick in the 2011 NFL draft
WR	T. J. Houshmandzadeh	September 6, 2010	Signed to a one-year contract

=== Roster releases ===
Pos.	Player	Date	Notes
TE	Quinn Sypniewski	February 17, 2010	Released due to a failed physical exam
CB	Samari Rolle	April 13, 2010	Released due to a sidelining neck injury from 2009 and his plans on retiring.

=== Changes to coaching staff ===
Coaching position	Former coach	New coach	Date	Notes	Ref.
Linebackers coach	Vic Fangio	Dean Pees	January 26, 2010	Fangio was released from his coaching duties after the signing of Pees, former New England Patriots defensive coordinator and linebackers coach.	
Quarterbacks coach	Hue Jackson	Jim Zorn	January 30, 2010	Jackson agreed to become the offensive coordinator for the Oakland Raiders, while Zorn was hired after a head coaching stint with the Washington Redskins.	

=== 2010 NFL draft ===
The Ravens finished with the worst record among teams exiting the playoffs in the divisional round, meaning that they will pick 25th overall. The Ravens traded their third and fourth round picks to the Arizona Cardinals to acquire wide receiver Anquan Boldin and a fifth round pick. The Ravens traded their seventh round pick to the Tampa Bay Buccaneers along with a sixth round pick in 2009 to acquire defensive lineman Marques Douglas. On the day of the draft, the Ravens traded away their first round pick to the Denver Broncos in exchange for a second, third, and fourth round pick. This gave the Ravens a total of seven draft picks.

2010 Baltimore Ravens draft
Round	Pick	Player	Position	College	Notes
2	43	Sergio Kindle	LB	Texas	
2	57	Terrence Cody	DT	Alabama	
3	70	Ed Dickson	TE	Oregon	
4	114	Dennis Pitta	TE	BYU	
5	156	David Reed	WR	Utah	
5	157	Arthur Jones	DT	Syracuse	
6	194	Ramon Harewood	OT	Morehouse College	
Made roster † Pro Football Hall of Fame * Made at least one Pro Bowl during career

== Personnel ==
=== Staff ===
Baltimore Ravens 2010 staff
Front office: Owner – Steve Bisciotti; Minority owner – Art Modell; President – Dick Cass; general manager/Executive Vice President – Ozzie Newsome; Vice president of football administration – Pat Moriarty; Senior personnel assistant – George Kokinis; Director of player personnel – Eric DeCosta; Director of pro personnel – Vincent Newsome; Director of college scouting – Joe Hortiz; Assistant director of pro personnel – Chad Alexander; Head coaches: Head coach – John Harbaugh; Head coach's assistant – Matt Weiss; Offensive coaches: Offensive coordinator – Cam Cameron; Quarterbacks – Jim Zorn; Running backs – Wilbert Montgomery; Wide receivers – Jim Hostler; Tight ends – Wade Harman; Offensive line – John Matsko; Assistant offensive line – Andy Moeller; Senior offensive assistant – Al Saunders; Offensive assistant – Craig Ver Steeg; Assistant to the offense – Jason Brooks	Defensive coaches: Defensive coordinator – Greg Mattison; Defensive line – Clarence Brooks; Linebackers – Dean Pees; Outside linebackers – Ted Monachino; Secondary – Chuck Pagano; Defensive assistant/secondary – Roy Anderson; Special teams coaches: Associate head coach/special teams coordinator – Jerry Rosburg; Kicking consultant – Randy Brown; Assistant special teams – Marwan Maalouf; Strength and conditioning: Strength and conditioning – Bob Rogucki; Assistant strength and conditioning – John Dunn; Assistant athletic trainer – Kevin Domboski; Assistant athletic trainer – Ron Medlin

=== Final roster ===
2010 Baltimore Ravens roster
Quarterbacks (QB): 10 Marc Bulger; 5 Joe Flacco; Running backs (RB): 33 Le'Ron McClain FB; 23 Willis McGahee; 34 Jalen Parmele; 27 Ray Rice; Wide receivers (WR): 81 Anquan Boldin; 84 T. J. Houshmandzadeh; 85 Derrick Mason; 16 David Reed; 11 Marcus Smith; 18 Donté Stallworth; Tight ends (TE): 83 Ed Dickson; 80 Davon Drew; 86 Todd Heap; 88 Dennis Pitta	Offensive linemen (OL): 77 Matt Birk C; 65 Chris Chester G; 64 Oniel Cousins T; 66 Ben Grubbs G; 79 Tony Moll G/T; 74 Michael Oher T; 73 Marshal Yanda T/G; Defensive linemen (DL): 62 Terrence Cody DE; 96 Lamar Divens NT; 97 Kelly Gregg NT; 61 Arthur Jones DE; 99 Paul Kruger DE; 91 Brandon McKinney DE; 92 Haloti Ngata DE; 93 Cory Redding DE	Linebackers (LB): 51 Brendon Ayanbadejo OLB; 54 Prescott Burgess OLB; 59 Dannell Ellerbe ILB; 56 Tavares Gooden ILB; 95 Jarret Johnson OLB; 52 Ray Lewis ILB; 53 Jameel McClain ILB; 58 Jason Phillips ILB; 55 Terrell Suggs OLB; Defensive backs (DB): 25 Chris Carr CB; 26 Dawan Landry SS; 43 Haruki Nakamura SS; 20 Ed Reed FS; 31 Fabian Washington CB; 21 Lardarius Webb CB; 29 Cary Williams CB; 37 Josh Wilson CB; 28 Tom Zbikowski FS; Special teams (ST): 7 Billy Cundiff K; 70 Kevin Houser LS; 4 Sam Koch P	Practice squad: 76 Brady Bond T; 12 Hunter Cantwell QB; 36 Danny Gorrer CB; 82 Justin Harper WR; 72 Bryan Mattison G; 47 Albert McClellan LB; 63 Andre Ramsey G; 42 Curtis Steele RB; Reserve: 46 Morgan Cox LS (IR); 24 Domonique Foxworth CB (IR); 71 Jared Gaither T (IR); 78 Ramon Harewood T (IR); 94 Sergio Kindle OLB (NF-Inj.); 32 Matt Lawrence RB (PUP); 67 Daniel Sanders C (IR); 98 Kelly Talavou NT (IR); Rookies in italics 52 active, 8 reserve, 8 practice squad

== Schedule ==
=== Preseason ===
The Ravens' preseason schedule was announced on March 31, 2010.

Week	Date	Opponent	Result	Record	Game site	Recap
1	August 12	Carolina Panthers	W 17–12	1–0	M&T Bank Stadium	Recap
2	August 21	at Washington Redskins	W 23–3	2–0	FedExField	Recap
3	August 28	New York Giants	W 24–10	3–0	M&T Bank Stadium	Recap
4	September 2	at St. Louis Rams	L 21–27	3–1	Edward Jones Dome	Recap

=== Regular season ===
Week	Date	Opponent	Result	Record	Game site	Recap
1	September 13	at New York Jets	W 10–9	1–0	New Meadowlands Stadium	Recap
2	September 19	at Cincinnati Bengals	L 10–15	1–1	Paul Brown Stadium	Recap
3	September 26	Cleveland Browns	W 24–17	2–1	M&T Bank Stadium	Recap
4	October 3	at Pittsburgh Steelers	W 17–14	3–1	Heinz Field	Recap
5	October 10	Denver Broncos	W 31–17	4–1	M&T Bank Stadium	Recap
6	October 17	at New England Patriots	L 20–23 (OT)	4–2	Gillette Stadium	Recap
7	October 24	Buffalo Bills	W 37–34 (OT)	5–2	M&T Bank Stadium	Recap
8	Bye					
9	November 7	Miami Dolphins	W 26–10	6–2	M&T Bank Stadium	Recap
10	November 11	at Atlanta Falcons	L 21–26	6–3	Georgia Dome	Recap
11	November 21	at Carolina Panthers	W 37–13	7–3	Bank of America Stadium	Recap
12	November 28	Tampa Bay Buccaneers	W 17–10	8–3	M&T Bank Stadium	Recap
13	December 5	Pittsburgh Steelers	L 10–13	8–4	M&T Bank Stadium	Recap
14	December 13	at Houston Texans	W 34–28 (OT)	9–4	Reliant Stadium	Recap
15	December 19	New Orleans Saints	W 30–24	10–4	M&T Bank Stadium	Recap
16	December 26	at Cleveland Browns	W 20–10	11–4	Cleveland Browns Stadium	Recap
17	January 2, 2011	Cincinnati Bengals	W 13–7	12–4	M&T Bank Stadium	Recap

== Game summaries ==
=== Regular season ===
==== Week 1: at New York Jets ====
Week 1: Baltimore Ravens at New York Jets – Game summary

Quarter	1	2	3	4	Total
Ravens	0	7	3	0	10
Jets	3	3	0	3	9

at New Meadowlands Stadium, East Rutherford, New Jersey

- Date: September 13
- Game time: 7:00 p.m. EDT
- Game weather: 67 °F (19 °C)
- Game attendance: 78,127
- Referee: Walt Anderson
- TV announcers (ESPN): Mike Tirico, Ron Jaworski, Jon Gruden, & Michele Tafoya
- Recap, Gamebook

Game information

First quarter

- NYJ – Nick Folk 23 yard field goal, Jets 3–0, Drive: 4 plays, 6 yards, 1:36.

Second quarter

- NYJ – Nick Folk 28 yard field goal, Jets 6–0, Drive: 5 plays, 27 yards, 3:23.
- BAL – Willis McGahee 1 yard run (Billy Cundiff kick), Ravens 7–6, Drive: 11 plays, 76 yards, 4:03.

Third quarter

- BAL – Billy Cundiff 25 yard field goal, Ravens 10–6, Drive: 9 plays, 85 yards, 4:30.

Fourth quarter

- NYJ – Nick Folk 48 yard field goal, Ravens 10–9, Drive: 4 plays, 5 yards, 1:30.

Top passers

- BAL – Joe Flacco – 20/38, 248 yards, 1 interception
- NYJ – Mark Sanchez – 10/21, 74 yards

Top rushers

- BAL – Ray Rice – 21 rushes, 43 yards
- NYJ – LaDainian Tomlinson – 11 rushes, 62 yards

Top receivers

- BAL – Anquan Boldin – 7 receptions, 110 yards
- NYJ – Jerricho Cotchery – 2 receptions, 18 yards

Top tacklers

- BAL – Ray Lewis – 4 tackles
- NYJ – Bryan Thomas – 7 tackles, 1 assist, 1 sack

The Ravens began their season at New Meadowlands Stadium for an AFC duel with the New York Jets in what was New York’s first regular season game at their new stadium.

Baltimore trailed early in the first quarter after quarterback Joe Flacco was sacked and fumbled on his first offensive play of the game. However, the Ravens' defense was able to hold the Jets to a 23-yard field goal from kicker Nick Folk. Folk kicked another field goal, from 28 yards, in the second quarter after a fumble by running back Willis McGahee. After that, the Ravens replied and took the lead when McGahee completed a 1-yard touchdown run. At the end of the first half, the Ravens led 7–6. The Ravens extended their lead in the third quarter when kicker Billy Cundiff got a 25-yard field goal. The Jets cut the lead in the fourth quarter when Folk kicked a field goal from 48 yards, making the score 10–9. The Ravens' defense managed to prevent any further progress and allowed them to take the win.

With the close win, Baltimore began the season at 1–0.

==== Week 2: at Cincinnati Bengals ====
Week 2: Baltimore Ravens at Cincinnati Bengals – Game summary

Quarter	1	2	3	4	Total
Ravens	0	0	7	3	10
Bengals	0	6	3	6	15

at Paul Brown Stadium, Cincinnati, Ohio

- Date: September 19
- Game time: 1:00 pm. EDT
- Game weather: 78 °F (26 °C) (Cloudy)
- Game attendance: 64,071
- Referee: Gene Steratore
- TV announcers (CBS): Bill Macatee and Rich Gannon
- Recap, Gamebook

Game information

First quarter Second quarter

- CIN – Mike Nugent 36 yard field goal, Bengals 3–0, Drive: 13 plays, 54 yards, 6:14.
- CIN – Mike Nugent 30 yard field goal, Bengals 6–0, Drive: 6 plays, 23 yards, 3:35.

Third quarter

- BAL – Derrick Mason 31 yard pass from Joe Flacco (Billy Cundiff kick), Ravens 7–6, Drive: 7 plays, 80 yards, 3:14.
- CIN – Mike Nugent 46 yard field goal, Bengals 9–7, Drive: 13 plays, 34 yards, 5:09.

Fourth quarter

- BAL – Billy Cundiff 38 yard field goal, Ravens 10–9, Drive: 8 plays, 52 yards, 3:49.
- CIN – Mike Nugent 38 yard field goal, Bengals 12–10, Drive: 4 plays, 21 yards, 1:12.
- CIN – Mike Nugent 25 yard field goal, Bengals 15–10, Drive: 4 plays, 4 yards, 1:31.

Top passers

- BAL – Joe Flacco – 17/39, 154 yards, 1 touchdown, 4 interceptions
- CIN – Carson Palmer – 16/35, 167 yards

Top rushers

- BAL – Ray Rice – 16 rushes, 87 yards
- CIN – Cedric Benson – 23 rushes, 78 yards

Top receivers

- BAL – Anquan Boldin – 5 receptions, 35 yards
- CIN – Terrell Owens – 3 receptions, 57 yards

Top tacklers

- BAL – Chris Carr – 6 tackles – 1 assist
- CIN – Chris Crocker – 4 tackles – 3 assist

Hoping to maintain their winning streak the Ravens flew to Paul Brown Stadium for an AFC North rivalry match against the Bengals. In the 2nd quarter Baltimore trailed early as kicker Mike Nugent hit a 36 and a 30-yard field goal. In the third quarter the Ravens replied and took the lead with QB Joe Flacco completing a 31-yard TD pass to WR Derrick Mason. The Bengals replied when Nugent hit a 46-yard field goal. The Ravens took the lead back in the fourth quarter when kicker Billy Cundiff got a 38-yard field goal, but it was cut off by Nugent's 38 and 25-yard field goal, giving Baltimore a loss.

With the loss, Baltimore fell to 1–1.

==== Week 3: vs. Cleveland Browns ====
Week 3: Cleveland Browns at Baltimore Ravens – Game summary

Quarter	1	2	3	4	Total
Browns	3	7	0	7	17
Ravens	7	7	0	10	24

at M&T Bank Stadium, Baltimore, Maryland

- Date: September 26
- Game time: 1:00 pm. EDT
- Game weather: 64 °F (18 °C) (Chance of rain)
- Game attendance: 71,119
- Referee: Scott Green
- TV announcers (CBS): Don Criqui and Steve Beuerlein
- Recap

Game information

First quarter

- CLE – Phil Dawson 38 yard field goal, Browns 3–0, Drive: 12 plays, 57 yards, 6:36.
- BAL – Anquan Boldin 8 yard pass from Joe Flacco (Billy Cundiff kick), Ravens 7–3, Drive: 10 plays, 85 yards, 4:45.

Second quarter

- BAL – Anquan Boldin 12 yard pass from Joe Flacco (Billy Cundiff kick), Ravens 14–3, Drive: 10 plays, 93 yards, 5:53.
- CLE – Peyton Hillis 1 yard run (Phil Dawson kick), Ravens 14–10, Drive: 11 plays, 83 yards, 5:46.

Third quarter

Fourth quarter

- CLE – Benjamin Watson 1 yard pass from Seneca Wallace (Phil Dawson kick), Browns 17–14, Drive: 6 plays, 86 yards, 1:51.
- BAL – Anquan Boldin 27 yard pass from Joe Flacco (Billy Cundiff kick), Ravens 21–17, Drive: 10 plays, 69 yards, 5:41.
- BAL – Billy Cundiff 49 yard field goal, Ravens 24–17, Drive: 6 plays, 11 yards, 2:10.

Top passers

- CLE – Seneca Wallace – 18/24, 141 yards, 1 touchdown
- BAL – Joe Flacco – 22/31, 262 yards, 3 touchdowns

Top rushers

- CLE – Peyton Hillis – 22 rushes, 144 yards, 1 touchdown
- BAL – Ray Rice – 15 rushes, 80 yards

Top receivers

- CLE – Josh Cribbs – 5 receptions, 58 yards
- BAL – Anquan Boldin – 8 receptions, 142 yards, 3 touchdowns

Top tacklers

- CLE – Eric Barton – 7 tackles, 2 assists
- BAL – Dawan Landry – 7 tackles, 2 assists, 1 sack

The Ravens' next match was an AFC North rivalry match against the Browns at home. In the 1st quarter the Ravens trailed early when kicker Phil Dawson made a 28-yard field goal, but got the lead back after QB Joe Flacco found WR Anquan Boldin on an 8 and a 12-yard TD pass. After that the Ravens fell behind when RB Peyton Hillis made a 1-yard TD run, followed in the 4th quarter by QB Seneca Wallace completing a 1-yard TD pass to TE Benjamin Watson. Then the Ravens replied and took the lead when Flacco made a 27-yard TD pass to WR Anquan Boldin, followed by kicker Billy Cundiff nailing a 49-yard field goal.

With the win, the Ravens improved to 2–1.

==== Week 4: at Pittsburgh Steelers ====
Week 4: Baltimore Ravens at Pittsburgh Steelers – Game summary

Quarter	1	2	3	4	Total
Ravens	0	10	0	7	17
Steelers	7	0	0	7	14

at Heinz Field, Pittsburgh, Pennsylvania

- Date: October 3
- Game time: 1:00 pm. EDT
- Game weather: 52 °F (11 °C) (Cloudy)
- Game attendance: 64,729
- Referee: Ed Hochuli
- TV announcers (CBS): Jim Nantz and Phil Simms
- Recap

Game information

First quarter

- PIT – Rashard Mendenhall 1 yard run (Jeff Reed kick), Steelers 7–0, Drive: 7 plays, 64 yards, 4:08.

Second quarter

- BAL – Willis McGahee 9 yard run (Billy Cundiff kick), Tied 7–7, Drive: 8 plays, 83 yards, 3:35.
- BAL – Billy Cundiff 33 yard field goal, Ravens 10–7, Drive: 14 plays, 48 yards, 5:20.

Third quarter

Fourth quarter

- PIT – Rashard Mendenhall 7 yard run (Jeff Reed kick), Steelers 14–10, Drive: 13 plays, 93 yards, 6:52.
- BAL – T. J. Houshmandzadeh 18 yard pass from Joe Flacco (Billy Cundiff kick), Ravens 17–14, Drive: 4 plays, 40 yards, 0:36.

Top passers

- BAL – Joe Flacco – 24/37, 256 yards, 1 touchdown, 1 interception
- PIT – Charlie Batch – 12/21, 141 yards, 1 interception

Top rushers

- BAL – Willis McGahee – 14 rushes, 39 yards, 1 touchdown
- PIT – Rashard Mendenhall – 25 rushes, 79 yards, 2 touchdowns

Top receivers

- BAL – Derrick Mason – 6 receptions, 80 yards
- PIT – Antwaan Randle El – 2 receptions, 50 yards

Top tacklers

- BAL – Haloti Ngata – 8 tackles, 3 assists, 1 sack
- PIT – Lawrence Timmons – 6 tackles, 3 assists

Coming off their divisional home win over the Browns, the Ravens flew to Heinz Field for their Week 4 duel with the Pittsburgh Steelers, in their 3rd straight divisional game.

Baltimore would trail early as Steelers running back Rashard Mendenhall picked up a 1-yard touchdown run. The Ravens would take the lead in the second quarter as running back Willis McGahee got a 9-yard touchdown run, followed by kicker Billy Cundiff making a 33-yard field goal. After a scoreless third quarter, Pittsburgh would get the lead again as Mendenhall made a 7-yard touchdown run in the fourth quarter. Fortunately, Baltimore was able to go back ahead as quarterback Joe Flacco completed an 18-yard touchdown pass to wide receiver T. J. Houshmandzadeh with 32 seconds remaining in regulation. Middle linebacker Ray Lewis intercepted Pittsburgh backup quarterback Charlie Batch on the Steelers' final possession to end the game.

With the win, the Ravens improved to 3–1.

==== Week 5: vs. Denver Broncos ====
Week 5: Denver Broncos at Baltimore Ravens – Game summary

Quarter	1	2	3	4	Total
Broncos	0	7	0	10	17
Ravens	7	10	0	14	31

at M&T Bank Stadium, Baltimore, Maryland

- Date: October 10
- Game time: 1:00 pm. EDT
- Game weather: 67 °F (19 °C) (Sunny)
- Game attendance: 71,246
- Referee: Jerome Boger
- TV announcers (CBS): Ian Eagle and Dan Fouts
- Recap

Game information

First quarter

- BAL – Joe Flacco 1 yard run (Billy Cundiff kick), Ravens 7–0, Drive: 9 plays, 73 yards, 4:36.

Second quarter

- BAL – Ray Rice 1 yard run (Billy Cundiff kick), Ravens 14–0, Drive: 5 plays, 72 yards, 2:30.
- BAL – Billy Cundiff 37 yard field goal, Ravens 17–0, Drive: 4 plays, 2 yards, 0:48.
- DEN – Brandon Lloyd 42 yard pass from Kyle Orton (Matt Prater kick), Ravens 17–7, Drive: 5 plays, 59 yards, 1:09.

Third quarter

Fourth quarter

- BAL – Ray Rice 1 yard run (Billy Cundiff kick), Ravens 24–7, Drive: 14 plays, 72 yards, 7:25.
- DEN – Matt Prater 38 yard field goal, Ravens 24–10, Drive: 8 plays, 61 yards, 2:31.
- BAL – Willis McGahee 30 yard run (Billy Cundiff kick), Ravens 31–10, Drive: 11 plays, 90 yards, 6:44.
- DEN – Brandon Lloyd 44 yard pass from Kyle Orton (Matt Prater kick), Ravens 31–17, Drive: 5 plays, 90 yards, 1:16.

Top passers

- DEN – Kyle Orton – 23/38, 314 yards, 2 touchdowns
- BAL – Joe Flacco – 14/25, 196 yards

Top rushers

- DEN – Laurence Maroney – 6 rushes, 27 yards
- BAL – Ray Rice – 27 rushes, 133 yards, 2 touchdowns

Top receivers

- DEN – Brandon Lloyd – 5 receptions, 135 yards, 2 touchdowns
- BAL – Ed Dickison – 1 reception, 58 yards

Top tacklers

- DEN – D.J. Williams – 10 tackles, 5 assists
- BAL – Ray Lewis – 5 tackles, 1 assist

Hoping to increase their winning streak the Ravens played on home ground for an AFC duel with the Broncos. In the first quarter the Ravens took the early lead with QB Joe Flacco scrambling 1 yard to the endzone for a touchdown, followed in the 2nd quarter by RB Ray Rice getting a 1-yard TD run. Then kicker Billy Cundiff got a 37-yard field goal. The lead was narrowed when QB Kyle Orton made a 42-yard TD pass to WR Brandon Lloyd, but the Ravens scored again at the beginning of the 4th quarter with Rice getting another 1-yard TD run. The Broncos replied with kicker Matt Prater hitting a 38-yard field goal, but RB Willis McGahee got a 30-yard TD run to put the Ravens ahead 31–10. The Broncos made the final score of the game with Orton finding Lloyd again on a 44-yard TD pass.

With the win, the Ravens improved to 4–1.

==== Week 6: at New England Patriots ====
Week 6: Baltimore Ravens at New England Patriots – Game summary

Quarter	1	2	3	4	OT	Total
Ravens	3	7	7	3	0	20
Patriots	7	0	3	10	3	23

at Gillette Stadium, Foxborough, Massachusetts

- Date: October 17
- Game time: 1:00 pm. EDT
- Game weather: 57 °F (14 °C) (Sunny)
- Game attendance: 68,756
- Referee: Bill Leavy
- TV announcers (CBS): Jim Nantz and Phil Simms
- Recap

Game information

First quarter

- BAL – Billy Cundiff 26 yard field goal, Ravens 3–0, Drive: 15 plays, 81 yards, 8:32.
- NE – BenJarvus Green-Ellis 2 yard run (Stephen Gostkowski kick), Patriots 7–3, Drive: 6 plays, 66 yards, 3:08.

Second quarter

- BAL – Todd Heap 16 yard pass form Joe Flacco (Billy Cundiff kick), Ravens 10–7, Drive: 9 plays, 73 yards, 3:38.

Third quarter

- BAL – Anquan Boldin 25 yard pass from Joe Flacco (Billy Cundiff kick), Ravens 17–7, Drive: 3 plays, 36 yards, 1:19.
- NE – Stephen Gostkowski 38 yard field goal, Ravens 17–10, Drive: 9 plays, 60 yards, 3:43.

Fourth quarter

- BAL – Billy Cundiff 25 yard field goal, Ravens 20–10, Drive: 13 plays, 84 yards, 6:47.
- NE – Deion Branch 5 yard pass from Tom Brady (Stephen Gostkowski kick), Ravens 20–17, Drive: 8 plays, 60 yards, 3:51.
- NE – Stephen Gostkowski 24 yard field goal, Tied 20–20, Drive: 13 plays, 80 yards, 6:50.

Overtime

- NE – Stephen Gostkowski 35 yard field goal, Patriots 23–20, Drive: 7 plays, 45 yards, 3:23.

Top passers

- BAL – Joe Flacco – 27/35, 285 yards, 2 touchdowns
- NE – Tom Brady – 27/44, 292 yards, 1 touchdown, 2 interceptions

Top rushers

- BAL – Ray Rice – 28 rushes, 88 yards
- NE – Danny Woodhead – 11 rushes, 63 yards

Top receivers

- BAL – Derrick Mason – 8 receptions, 100 yards
- NE – Deion Branch – 9 receptions, 98 yards, 1 touchdown

Top tacklers

- BAL – Dawan Landry – 8 tackles, 4 assists
- NE – Jerod Mayo – 11 tackles, 7 assists

Hoping to increase their winning streak the Ravens flew to Gillette Stadium for an AFC duel with the Patriots. In the 1st quarter the Ravens got the early lead as kicker Billy Cundiff got a 26-yard field goal, but fell behind with RB BenJarvus Green-Ellis making a 2-yard TD run. The Ravens got the lead back when QB Joe Flacco made a 16-yard TD pass to TE Todd Heap, followed in the third quarter by Flacco finding WR Anquan Boldin on a 25-yard TD pass. The Patriots replied with kicker Stephen Gostkowski getting a 38-yard field goal, but the Ravens continued to score with Cundiff making a 25-yard field goal. The Patriots rallied with QB Tom Brady making a 5-yard TD pass to WR Deion Branch. This was followed by Gostkowski making a 24-yard field goal and then a 35-yard field goal in overtime to give the Ravens their second loss of the season.

With the loss, the Ravens fell to 4–2.

==== Week 7: vs. Buffalo Bills ====
Week 7: Buffalo Bills at Baltimore Ravens – Game summary

Quarter	1	2	3	4	OT	Total
Bills	10	14	0	10	0	34
Ravens	3	17	14	0	3	37

at M&T Bank Stadium, Baltimore, Maryland

- Date: October 24
- Game time: 1:00 pm. EDT
- Game weather: 70 °F (21 °C) (Partly Sunny)
- Game attendance: 71,220
- Referee: Pete Morelli
- TV announcers (CBS): Don Criqui and Steve Beuerlein
- Recap

Game information

First quarter

- BAL – Billy Cundiff 41 yard field goal, Ravens 3–0, Drive: 7 plays, 45 yards, 2:27.
- BUF – Lee Evans 33 yard pass from Ryan Fitzpatrick (Rian Lindell kick), Bills 7–3, Drive: 6 plays, 72 yards, 3:15.
- BUF – Rian Lindell 21 yard field goal, Bills 10–3, Drive: 7 plays, 12 yards, 2:59.

Second quarter

- BUF – Stevie Johnson 33 yard pass from Ryan Fitzpatrick (Rian Lindell kick), Bills 17–3, Drive: 11 plays, 91 yards, 4:55.
- BAL – Todd Heap 26 yard pass from Joe Flacco (Billy Cundiff kick), Bills 17–10, Drive: 4 plays, 80 yards, 1:31.
- BUF – Lee Evans 20 yard pass from Ryan Fitzpatrick (Rian Lindell kick), Bills 24–10, Drive: 6 plays, 82 yards, 3:19.
- BAL – Billy Cundiff 48 yard field goal, Bills 24–13, Drive: 11 plays, 50 yards, 4:08.
- BAL – Todd Heap 14 yard pass from Joe Flacco (Billy Cundiff kick), Bills 24–20, Drive: 4 plays, 27 yards, 0:25.

Third quarter

- BAL – Anquan Boldin 34 yard pass from Joe Flacco (Billy Cundiff kick), Ravens 27–24, Drive: 1 plays, 34 yards, 0:07.
- BAL – Willis McGahee 2 yard run (Billy Cundiff kick), Ravens 34–24, Drive: 12 plays, 65 yards, 6:25.

Fourth quarter

- BUF – Lee Evans 17 yard pass from Ryan Fitzpatrick (Rian Lindell kick), Ravens 34–31, Drive: 5 plays, 63 yards, 2:42.
- BUF – Rian Lindell 50 yard field goal, Tied 34–34, Drive: 12 plays, 59 yards, 3:22.

Overtime

- BAL – Billy Cundiff 38 yard field goal, Ravens 37–34, Drive: 4 plays, 9 yards, 1:58.

Top passers

- BUF – Ryan Fitzpatrick – 29/43, 382 yards, 4 touchdowns, 2 interceptions
- BAL – Joe Flacco – 16/31, 250 yards, 3 touchdowns

Top rushers

- BUF – Fred Jackson – 23 rushes, 73 yards
- BAL – Ray Rice – 16 rushes, 72 yards

Top receivers

- BUF – Stevie Johnson – 8 receptions, 158 yards, 1 touchdown
- BAL – Anquan Boldin – 6 receptions, 92 yards, 1 touchdown

Top tacklers

- BUF – Donte Whitner – 7 tackles, 1 assist
- BAL – Ray Lewis – 14 tackles, 1 assist, 1 sack, 1 forced fumble

Hoping to rebound from their loss to the Patriots the Ravens played on home ground for an AFC duel with the Bills. It was Ed Reed's first game of the season following an absence from injury, a game in which he would intercept two passes. In the 1st quarter the Ravens took the lead as kicker Billy Cundiff made a 41-yard field goal. But they trailed with QB Ryan Fitzpatrick completing a 33-yard TD pass to WR Lee Evans, followed by kicker Rian Lindell hitting a 21-yard field goal. The lead was increased in the second quarter with Fitzpatrick finding WR Stevie Johnson on a 33-yard TD pass. The Ravens replied with QB Joe Flacco making a 26-yard TD pass to TE Todd Heap. But Fitzpatrick found Evans again on a 20-yard TD pass to put the Bills up 24–10. The lead was narrowed when Cundiff hit a 48-yard field goal, followed by Flacco throwing a 14-yard TD pass to Heap. In the third quarter, the Bills had possession first, but their first play was a pass to that was intercepted by Ed Reed. On the next play, the Ravens got the lead back with Flacco completing a 34-yard TD pass to WR Anquan Boldin, followed by RB Willis McGahee getting a 2-yard TD run. The Bills managed to tie the game in the 4th quarter with Fitzpatrick making a 17-yard TD pass to Evans, and with Lindell getting a 50-yard field goal. In overtime, the Buffalo offense was driving in their own territory when after catching a pass, Ray Lewis stripped the ball from the receiver before he was down on contact. Soon after, the Bills were called for an unsportsmanlike conduct penalty of 15 yards, thereby placing the Ravens within Cundiff's comfortable range. A few plays later, including a 5-yard penalty, Cundiff successfully put the game away a 38-yard field goal to give the Ravens the win.

With the win, the Ravens went into their bye week at 5–2.

==== Week 9: vs. Miami Dolphins ====
Week 9: Miami Dolphins at Baltimore Ravens – Game summary

Quarter	1	2	3	4	Total
Dolphins	7	3	0	0	10
Ravens	7	6	7	6	26

at M&T Bank Stadium, Baltimore, Maryland

- Date: November 7
- Game time: 1:00 pm. EST
- Game weather: 50 °F (10 °C) (Partly Cloudy)
- Game attendance: 71,305
- Referee: John Parry
- TV announcers (CBS): Greg Gumbel and Dan Dierdorf
- Recap

Game information

First quarter

- BAL – Willis McGahee 32 yard pass from Joe Flacco (Billy Cundiff kick), Ravens 7–0, Drive: 7 plays, 76 yards, 2:52.
- MIA – Ronnie Brown 12 yard run (Dan Carpenter kick), Tied 7–7, Drive: 11 plays, 75 yards, 6:45.

Second quarter

- BAL – Billy Cundiff 26 yard field goal, Ravens 10–7, Drive: 12 plays, 56 yards, 6:10.
- BAL – Billy Cundiff 39 yard field goal, Ravens 13–7, Drive: 10 plays, 39 yards, 6:13.
- MIA – Dan Carpenter 19 yard field goal, Ravens 13–10, Drive: 11 plays, 79 yards, 2:40.

Third quarter

- BAL – Derrick Mason 12 yard pass from Joe Flacco (Billy Cundiff kick), Ravens 20–10, Drive: 6 plays, 96 yards, 2:49.

Fourth quarter

- BAL – Billy Cundiff 20 yard field goal, Ravens 23–10, Drive: 13 plays, 61 yards, 5:58.
- BAL – Billy Cundiff 24 yard field goal, Ravens 26–10, Drive: 7 plays, 12 yards, 4:16

Top passers

- MIA – Chad Henne – 22/34, 213 yards, 3 interceptions
- BAL – Joe Flacco – 20/27, 266 yards, 2 touchdowns

Top rushers

- MIA – Ronnie Brown – 9 rushes, 59 yards, 1 touchdown
- BAL – Ray Rice – 22 rushes, 83 yards

Top receivers

- MIA – Brian Hartline – 4 receptions, 85 yards
- BAL – Ray Rice – 7 receptions, 97 yards

Top tacklers

- MIA – Karlos Dansby – 10 tackles
- BAL – Ray Lewis – 7 tackles, 1 assist

Coming off their bye week the Ravens played on home ground for an AFC duel with the Dolphins. The Ravens took the lead after QB Joe Flacco completed a 32-yard TD pass to RB Willis McGahee. The Dolphins replied with RB Ronnie Brown getting a 12-yard TD run. The Ravens got the lead back after kicker Billy Cundiff made a 26 and a 39-yard field goal. The Dolphins narrowed the lead with kicker Dan Carpenter nailing a 19-yard field goal. The Ravens took control after Flacco found WR Derrick Mason on a 12-yard TD pass. This was followed in the 4th quarter by Cundiff hitting a 20 and a 24-yard field goal. The Ravens in this game were the 3rd team in NFL history to have a game without a turnover or have to punt.

With the win, the Ravens improve to 6–2.

==== Week 10: at Atlanta Falcons ====
Week 10: Baltimore Ravens at Atlanta Falcons – Game summary

Quarter	1	2	3	4	Total
Ravens	0	0	7	14	21
Falcons	0	10	3	13	26

at Georgia Dome, Atlanta, Georgia

- Date: November 11
- Game time: 8:20 pm. EST
- Game weather: None (dome stadium)
- Game attendance: 68,474
- Referee: Ron Winter
- TV announcers (NFLN): Bob Papa, Matt Millen and Joe Theismann
- Recap

Game information

First quarter

Second quarter

- ATL – Jason Snelling 28 yard pass from Matt Ryan (Matt Bryant kick), Falcons 7–0, Drive: 14 plays, 91 yards, 6:38.
- ATL – Matt Bryant 28 yard field goal, Falcons 10–0, Drive: 12 plays, 33 yards, 4:34.

Third quarter

- ATL – Matt Bryant 51 yard field goal, Falcons 13–0, Drive: 4 plays, 6 yards, 0:59.
- BAL – Anquan Boldin 5 yard pass from Joe Flacco (Billy Cundiff kick), Falcons 13–7, Drive: 10 plays, 65 yards, 6:01.

Fourth quarter

- ATL – Roddy White 4 yard pass from Matt Ryan (Matt Bryant kick), Falcons 20–7, Drive: 11 plays, 75 yards, 5:15.
- BAL – Derrick Mason 6 yard pass from Joe Flacco (Billy Cundiff kick), Falcons 20–14, Drive: 11 plays, 75 yards, 5:52.
- BAL – Todd Heap 9 yard pass from Joe Flacco (Billy Cundiff kick), Ravens 21–20, Drive: 8 plays, 72 yards, 1:52.
- ATL – Roddy White 33 yard pass from Matt Ryan (pass failed), Falcons 26–21, Drive: 7 plays, 80 yards, 0:45.

Top passers

- BAL – Joe Flacco – 22/34, 215 yards, 3 touchdowns, 1 interception
- ATL – Matt Ryan – 32/50, 316 yards, 3 touchdowns

Top rushers

- BAL – Ray Rice – 12 rushes, 59 yards
- ATL – Michael Turner – 17 rushes, 39 yards

Top receivers

- BAL – Todd Heap – 4 receptions, 57 yards, 1 touchdown
- ATL – Roddy White – 12 receptions, 138 yards, 2 touchdowns

Top tacklers

- BAL – Jarret Johnson, Lardarius Webb – 6 tackles
- ATL – Curtis Lofton – 8 tackles, 2 assists

Coming off their home win over the Dolphins, the Ravens flew to the Georgia Dome for a Week 10 interconference duel with the throwback-cladded Atlanta Falcons on Thursday night. After a scoreless first quarter, Baltimore trailed in the second quarter as Falcons quarterback Matt Ryan completed a 28-yard touchdown pass to running back Jason Snelling, followed by kicker Matt Bryant making a 28-yard field goal.

Atlanta added onto their lead in the third quarter with Bryant's 51-yard field goal, yet the Ravens answered with quarterback Joe Flacco found wide receiver Anquan Boldin on a 5-yard touchdown pass. The Falcons struck back in the fourth quarter as Ryan completed a 4-yard touchdown pass to wide receiver Roddy White. Baltimore took the lead as Flacco hooked up with wide receiver Derrick Mason on a 6-yard touchdown pass, followed by finding tight end Todd Heap on a 9-yard touchdown pass. However, Atlanta got the last laugh as Ryan completed a 33-yard touchdown pass to White (with a failed two-point conversion).

With the loss, the Ravens fell to 6–3.

==== Week 11: at Carolina Panthers ====
Week 11: Baltimore Ravens at Carolina Panthers – Game summary

Quarter	1	2	3	4	Total
Ravens	10	7	3	17	37
Panthers	0	3	3	7	13

at Bank of America Stadium, Charlotte, North Carolina

- Date: November 21
- Game time: 1:00 pm. EST
- Game weather: 65 °F (18 °C) (Sunny)
- Game attendance: 73,021
- Referee: Alberto Riveron
- TV announcers (CBS): Kevin Harlan and Solomon Wilcots
- Recap

Game information

First quarter

- BAL – T. J. Houshmandzadeh 56 yard pass from Joe Flacco (Billy Cundiff kick), Ravens 7–0, Drive: 2 plays, 50 yards, 0:33.
- BAL – Billy Cundiff 22 yard field goal, Ravens 10–0, Drive: 13 plays, 84 yards, 7:18.

Second quarter

- CAR – John Kasay 45 yard field goal, Ravens 10–3, Drive: 6 plays, 53 yards, 2:36.
- BAL – Ray Rice 1 yard run (Billy Cundiff kick), Ravens 17–3, Drive: 8 plays, 51 yards, 3:27.

Third quarter

- BAL – Billy Cundiff 33 yard field goal, Ravens 20–3, Drive: 4 plays, 3 yards, 1:02.
- CAR – John Kasay 40 yard field goal, Ravens 20–6, Drive: 5 plays, 3 yards, 2:09.

Fourth quarter

- CAR – David Gettis 88 yard pass from Brian St. Pierre (John Kasay kick), Ravens 20–13, Drive: 3 plays, 86 yards, 0:29.
- BAL – Billy Cundiff 49 yard field goal, Ravens 23–13, Drive: 7 plays, 48 yards, 3:45.
- BAL – Dawan Landry 23 yard lateral pass from Ed Reed interception return (Billy Cundiff kick), Ravens 30–13.
- BAL – Ray Lewis 24 yard interception return (Billy Cundiff kick), Ravens 37–13.

Top passers

- BAL – Joe Flacco – 24/33, 301 yards, 1 touchdown
- CAR – Brian St. Pierre – 13/28, 173 yards, 1 touchdown, 2 interceptions

Top rushers

- BAL – Ray Rice – 19 rushes, 65 yards, 1 touchdown
- CAR – Mike Goodson – 22 rushes, 120 yards

Top receivers

- BAL – T.J. Houshmadzadeh – 2 receptions, 79 yards, 1 touchdown
- CAR – David Gettis – 2 receptions, 92 yards, 1 touchdown

Top tacklers

- BAL – Ray Lewis – 8 tackles, 2 assists, 1 interception
- CAR – Charles Godfrey – 7 tackles, 1 forced fumble

Hoping to rebound from their loss to the Falcons the Ravens flew to Bank of America Stadium for an inter-conference duel with the Panthers. In the first quarter the Ravens took the early lead with quarterback Joe Flacco getting a 56-yard TD pass to wide receiver T. J. Houshmandzadeh. This was followed by kicker Billy Cundiff nailing a 22-yard field goal. The Panthers replied with kicker John Kasay making a 45-yard field goal, but the Ravens increased their lead with RB Ray Rice getting a 1-yard TD run, followed in the third quarter by Cundiff hitting a 33-yard field goal. The lead was narrowed when Kasay made a 40-yard field goal. This was followed by quarterback Brian St. Pierre completing an 88-yard TD pass to wide receiver David Gettis. The Ravens took further command with Cundiff hitting a 49-yard field goal. The Ravens then scored two defensive touchdowns in 11 seconds with an interception by safety Ed Reed that was lateraled to safety Dawan Landry who returned it for a touchdown, followed by Ray Lewis returning another interception 24 yards for a touchdown.

With the win, the Ravens improved to 7–3.

==== Week 12: vs. Tampa Bay Buccaneers ====
Week 12: Tampa Bay Buccaneers at Baltimore Ravens – Game summary

Quarter	1	2	3	4	Total
Buccaneers	0	3	0	7	10
Ravens	0	17	0	0	17

at M&T Bank Stadium, Baltimore, Maryland

- Date: November 28
- Game time: 4:15 pm. EST
- Game weather: 48 °F (9 °C) (Clear)
- Game attendance: 70,989
- Referee: Carl Cheffers
- TV announcers (Fox): Sam Rosen and Tim Ryan
- Recap

Game information

First quarter

Second quarter

- BAL – Billy Cundiff 45 yard field goal, Ravens 3–0, Drive: 7 plays, 14 yards, 3:05.
- TB – Connor Barth 22 yard field goal, Tied 3–3, Drive: 10 plays, 32 yards, 4:24.
- BAL – Todd Heap 65 yard pass from Joe Flacco (Billy Cundiff kick), Ravens 10–3, Drive: 4 plays, 76 yards, 1:28.
- BAL – Derrick Mason 10 yard pass from Joe Flacco (Billy Cundiff kick), Ravens 17–3, Drive: 5 plays, 55 yards, 1:22.

Third quarter

Fourth quarter

- TB – Kellen Winslow 5 yard pass from Josh Freeman (Connor Barth kick), Ravens 17–10, Drive: 13 plays, 77 yards, 4:38.

Top passers

- TB – Josh Freeman – 17/37, 162 yards, 1 touchdown
- BAL – Joe Flacco – 25/35, 289 yards, 2 touchdowns, 1 interception

Top rushers

- TB – LeGarrette Blount – 13 rushes, 55 yards
- BAL – Ray Rice – 19 rushes, 82 yards

Top receivers

- TB – Kellen Winslow – 4 receptions, 44 yards, 1 touchdown
- BAL – Derrick Mason – 8 receptions, 87 yards, 1 touchdown

Top tacklers

- TB – Geno Hayes – 6 tackles
- BAL – Ray Lewis – 7 tackles, 5 assists

The Ravens were facing the Tampa Bay Buccaneers, a team with an identical 7–3 record. However, the Ravens were considered favorites going into the game, given that they had never lost at home during the season, and all Tampa Bay wins were against teams with losing records. Still, they did not take this one lightly. After a scoreless first quarter, the Ravens scored first with a field goal. Tampa Bay later tied it, but Baltimore scored two touchdowns, including one on a 65-yard pass from Todd Heap, to have a 17–3 halftime lead. During a scoreless third quarter, a would be long TD-run from Ray Rice was negated by a controversial call of a penalty on Anquan Boldin. Though the Ravens would never score anymore in the game, they managed to hold off Tampa Bay and allow just one touchdown, enough to prevent their lead from being blown.

==== Week 13: vs. Pittsburgh Steelers ====
Week 13: Pittsburgh Steelers at Baltimore Ravens – Game summary

Quarter	1	2	3	4	Total
Steelers	0	0	3	10	13
Ravens	7	0	3	0	10

at M&T Bank Stadium, Baltimore, Maryland

- Date: December 5
- Game time: 8:20 pm. EST
- Game weather: 35 °F (2 °C) (Partly Cloudy)
- Game attendance: 71,418
- Referee: Terry McAulay
- TV announcers (NBC): Al Michaels, Cris Collinsworth and Andrea Kremer
- Recap

Game information

First quarter

- BAL – Anquan Boldin 14 yard pass from Joe Flacco (Billy Cundiff kick), Ravens 7–0, Drive: 10 plays, 92 yards, 7:10.

Second quarter

Third quarter

- PIT – Shaun Suisham 45 yard field goal, Ravens 7–3, Drive: 8 plays, 53 yards, 4:06.
- BAL – Billy Cundiff 24 yard field goal, Ravens 10–3, Drive: 13 plays, 60 yards, 3:41.

Fourth quarter

- PIT – Shaun Suisham 19 yard field goal, Ravens 10–6, Drive: 16 plays, 79 yards, 9:27.
- PIT – Isaac Redman 9 yard pass from Ben Roethlisberger (Shaun Suisham kick), Steelers 13–10, Drive: 3 plays, 9 yards, 0:22.

Top passers

- PIT – Ben Roethlisberger – 22/38, 253 yards, 1 touchdown, 1 interception
- BAL – Joe Flacco – 17/33, 266 yards, 1 touchdown

Top rushers

- PIT – Rashard Mendenhall – 19 rushes, 45 yards
- BAL – Ray Rice – 9 rushes, 32 yards

Top receivers

- PIT – Mike Wallace – 5 receptions, 76 yards
- BAL – Anquan Boldin – 5 receptions, 118 yards, 1 touchdown

Top tacklers

- PIT – James Farrior – 6 tackles, 1 assist, 1 sack
- BAL – Ray Lewis – 12 tackles, 1 assist, 1 forced fumble

Coming off their win over the Buccaneers, the Ravens stayed at home for a Week 13 AFC North rematch with the Pittsburgh Steelers on Sunday night. Baltimore delivered the game's opening strike in the first quarter as quarterback Joe Flacco found wide receiver Anquan Boldin on a 14-yard touchdown pass. After a scoreless second quarter, the Steelers responded with kicker Shaun Suisham got a 45-yard field goal. The Ravens would answer with a 24-yard field goal from kicker Billy Cundiff. Pittsburgh would get another field goal in the fourth quarter, a 19-yarder by Suisham. In the final minutes of the game, the Ravens were driving, trying to run down the clock, when Troy Polamalu sacked Flacco, forcing a fumble in the process. The Steelers recovered the fumble and returned it to the Ravens' 9-yard line. Two plays later, quarterback Ben Roethlisberger completed a 9-yard touchdown pass to running back Isaac Redman. Baltimore tried to rally, but the Steelers' defense held on to preserve the win.

With the loss, the Ravens fell to 8–4.

==== Week 14: at Houston Texans ====
Week 14: Baltimore Ravens at Houston Texans – Game summary

Quarter	1	2	3	4	OT	Total
Ravens	7	14	7	0	6	34
Texans	0	7	6	15	0	28

at Reliant Stadium, Houston, Texas

- Date: December 13
- Game time: 8:30 pm. EST/7:30 p.m. CST
- Game weather: None (Dome Closed)
- Referee: Bill Leavy
- TV announcers (ESPN): Mike Tirico, Ron Jaworski, Jon Gruden, Suzy Kolber and Michele Tafoya
- Recap

Game information

First quarter

- BAL – Willis McGahee 1 yard run (Billy Cundiff kick), Ravens 7–0, Drive: 8 plays, 52 yards, 3:55.

Second quarter

- BAL – Derrick Mason 9 yard pass from Joe Flacco (Billy Cundiff kick), Ravens 14–0, Drive: 6 plays, 44 yards, 3:15.
- BAL – Derrick Mason 26 yard pass from Joe Flacco (Billy Cundiff kick), Ravens 21–0, Drive: 4 plays, 38 yards, 0:34.
- HOU – Andre Johnson 46 yard pass from Matt Schaub (Neil Rackers kick), Ravens 21–7, Drive: 7 plays, 80 yards, 0:55.

Third quarter

- BAL – David Reed 103 yard kickoff return (Billy Cundiff kick), Ravens 28–7, Drive: 0 plays, 0 yards, 0:15.
- HOU – Neil Rackers 24 yard field goal, Ravens 28–10, Drive: 16 plays, 70 yards, 7:37.
- HOU – Neil Rackers 42 yard field goal, Ravens 28–13, Drive: 10 plays, 42 yards, 4:28.

Fourth quarter

- HOU – Jacoby Jones 7 yard pass from Matt Schaub (Neil Rackers kick), Ravens 28–20, Drive: 15 plays, 99 yards, 5:03.
- HOU – Andre Johnson 5 yard pass from Matt Schaub (Matt Schaub – Jacoby Jones pass), Tied 28–28, Drive: 12 plays, 95 yards, 2:21.

Overtime

- BAL – Josh Wilson 12 yard interception return, Ravens 34–28.

Top passers

- BAL – Joe Flacco – 22/33, 235 yards, 2 touchdowns
- HOU – Matt Schaub – 31/62, 393 yards, 3 touchdowns, 2 interceptions

Top rushers

- BAL – Ray Rice – 19 rushes, 54 yards
- HOU – Arian Foster – 20 rushes, 100 yards

Top receivers

- BAL – Derrick Mason – 6 receptions, 78 yards, 2 touchdowns
- HOU – Andre Johnson – 9 receptions, 140 yards, 2 touchdowns

Top tacklers

- BAL – Josh Wilson – 7 tackles, 1 interception
- HOU – Kevin Bentley – 6 tackles, 5 assists

Hoping to rebound from their loss to the Steelers, the Ravens flew to Reliant Stadium for a Week 14 Monday night duel with the Houston Texans. Baltimore delivered the game's opening strike with a 1-yard touchdown run from running back Willis McGahee. The Ravens added onto their lead in the second quarter as quarterback Joe Flacco found wide receiver Derrick Mason on a 9-yard and a 26-yard touchdown pass. The Texans answered with quarterback Matt Schaub completing a 46-yard touchdown pass to wide receiver Andre Johnson.

Baltimore struck back to open the third quarter with rookie wide receiver David Reed returning the second half's opening kickoff 103 yards for a touchdown. Houston responded with kicker Neil Rackers making a 24-yard and a 42-yard field goal. The Texans tied the game in the fourth quarter as Schaub completed a 7-yard touchdown pass to wide receiver Jacoby Jones, a 5-yard touchdown pass to Johnson, and a successful two-point conversion pass to Jones. In overtime, the Ravens got the win as cornerback Josh Wilson returned a 12-yard interception for a touchdown.

With the win, Baltimore improved to 9–4.

==== Week 15: vs. New Orleans Saints ====
Week 15: New Orleans Saints at Baltimore Ravens – Game summary

Quarter	1	2	3	4	Total
Saints	7	7	3	7	24
Ravens	7	14	3	6	30

at M&T Bank Stadium, Baltimore, Maryland

- Date: December 19
- Game time: 1:00 pm. EST
- Game weather: 34 °F (1 °C) (Partly Cloudy)
- Game attendance: 71,432
- Referee: Walt Anderson
- TV announcers (Fox): Thom Brennaman, Brian Billick, & Chris Myers
- Recap

Game information

First quarter

- NO – Jimmy Graham 18 yard pass from Drew Brees (Garrett Hartley kick), Saints 7–0, Drive: 7 plays, 60 yards, 3:08.
- BAL – Ed Dickson 34 yard pass from Joe Flacco (Billy Cundiff kick), Tied 7–7, Drive: 9 plays, 76 yards, 4:20.

Second quarter

- BAL – Ray Rice 10 yard run (Billy Cundiff kick), Ravens 14–7, Drive: 9 plays, 58 yards, 4:15.
- BAL – Ray Rice 17 yard pass from Joe Flacco (Billy Cundiff kick), Ravens 21–7, Drive: 5 plays, 34 yards, 3:05.
- NO – Jimmy Graham 1 yard pass from Drew Brees (Garrett Hartley kick), Ravens 21–14, Drive: 9 plays, 92 yards, 2:52.

Third quarter

- NO – Garrett Hartley 47 yard field goal, Ravens 21–17, Drive: 7 plays, 20 yards, 4:08.
- BAL – Billy Cundiff 33 yard field goal, Ravens 24–17, Drive: 9 plays, 59 yards, 4:09.

Fourth quarter

- NO – Lance Moore 15 yard pass from Drew Brees (Garrett Hartley kick), Tied 24–24, Drive: 5 plays, 66 yards, 1:31.
- BAL – Billy Cundiff 32 yard field goal, Ravens 27–24, Drive: 5 plays, 66 yards, 1:31.
- BAL – Billy Cundiff 27 yard field goal, Ravens 30–24, Drive: 4 plays, 9 yards, 1:38.

Top passers

- NO – Drew Brees – 29/46, 267 yards, 3 touchdowns, 1 interception
- BAL – Joe Flacco – 10/20, 172 yards, 2 touchdowns

Top rushers

- NO – Pierre Thomas – 6 rushes, 20 yards
- BAL – Ray Rice – 31 rushes, 153 yards

Top receivers

- NO – Marques Colston – 6 receptions, 80 yards
- BAL – Ray Rice – 5 receptions, 80 yards, 1 touchdown

Top tacklers

- NO – Jonathan Vilma – 8 tackles, 3 assists
- BAL – Jarret Johnson – 6 tackles, 1 assist, 1 sack, 1 forced fumble

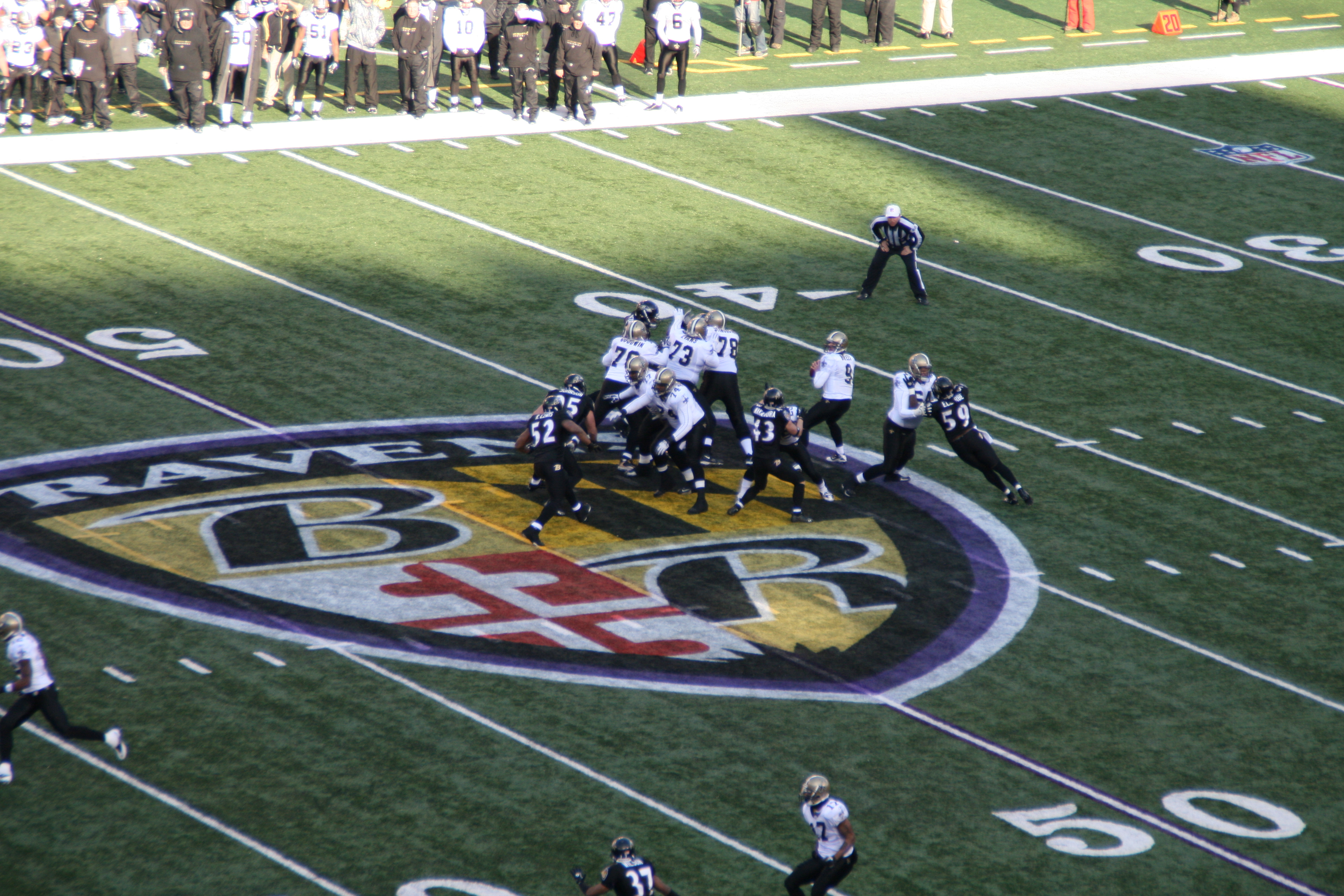
Saints quarterback Brees (#9) drops back as Lewis (#52) blitzes

Hoping to beat the defending Super Bowl champs, the Ravens returned home. New Orleans struck first with an 18-yard pass from Drew Brees to Jimmy Graham, but Baltimore quickly answered with Flacco throwing a 34-yard pass to Ed Dickson. The Ravens then followed with two touchdowns, both by Ray Rice, one rushing (10 yards) and one passing (17 yards), to bring the score up 21–7. At the close of the half, the Saints scored on a 1-yard pass to Graham to bring the halftime score to 21–14. The Saints kicked a field goal to enter the third quarter to make it 21–17, but the Ravens quickly answered that with a field goal to make it 24–17. The Saints tied it in the fourth quarter on a 15-yard touchdown pass to Lance Moore in the corner of the end zone, a play that was challenged by Baltimore but not overturned. The Ravens managed to get ahead with a Billy Cundiff field goal with 10:03 remaining 27–24.The Saints had the ball in the final minutes backed up near their own end zone when Drew Brees threw an interception to Cory Redding to give Baltimore a chance to run off the clock. Though there was not enough time to run off the entire clock, Baltimore managed to leave just 9 seconds as they kicked a field goal to make it 30–24. The Saints had one last chance on their kickoff return in which they pitched it around in hopes of a touchdown, but they were stopped. They were also called for a moot penalty for a forward pass that would have rendered any drive at this point null.

Overall, the game was highlighted by Ray Rice's 153 yards rushing and two touchdowns, Billy Cundiff's two field goals, and the Redding interception that virtually ended the game.

With the win, the Ravens went to 10–4, nearly clinching a playoff berth.

==== Week 16: at Cleveland Browns ====
Week 16: Baltimore Ravens at Cleveland Browns – Game summary

Quarter	1	2	3	4	Total
Ravens	0	13	7	0	20
Browns	7	3	0	0	10

at Cleveland Browns Stadium, Cleveland, Ohio

- Date: December 26
- Game time: 1:00 pm. EST
- Game weather: 26 °F (−3 °C) (Clear & Windy, wind chill 13 °F (−11 °C))
- Game attendance: 65,028
- Referee: John Parry
- TV announcers (CBS): Ian Eagle and Dan Fouts
- Recap

Game information

First quarter

- CLE – Brian Robiskie 29 yard pass from Mohamed Massaquoi (Phil Dawson kick), Browns 7–0, Drive: 4 plays, 40 yards, 2:12.

Second quarter

- BAL – Billy Cundiff 27 yard field goal, Browns 7–3, Drive: 16 plays, 80 yards, 8:26.
- BAL – T. J. Houshmandzadeh 15 yard pass from Joe Flacco (Billy Cundiff kick), Ravens 10–7, Drive: 9 plays, 28 yards, 3:56.
- BAL – Billy Cundiff 40 yard field goal, Ravens 13–7, Drive: 9 plays, 28 yards, 3:56.
- CLE – Phil Dawson 30 yard field goal, Ravens 13–10, Drive: 10 plays, 50 yards, 4:03.

Third quarter

- BAL – Derrick Mason 22 yard pass from Joe Flacco (Billy Cundiff kick), Ravens 20–10, Drive: 3 plays, 38 yards, 1:30.

Fourth quarter

- No scoring plays

Top passers

- BAL – Joe Flacco – 12/19, 102 yards, 2 touchdowns, 1 interception
- CLE – Colt McCoy – 15/29, 149 yards, 3 interceptions

Top rushers

- BAL – Ray Rice – 25 rushes, 92 yards
- CLE – Peyton Hillis – 12 rushes, 35 yards

Top receivers

- BAL – Derrick Mason – 4 receptions, 50 yards, 1 touchdown
- CLE – Mike Bell – 2 receptions, 48 yards

Top tacklers

- BAL – Jameel McClain – 5 tackles, 2 assists
- CLE – Kenyon Coleman – 7 tackles

The Ravens entered the game knowing that if they would win, they would be guaranteed a playoff spot for the third year in a row. Also hoping to make it three straight wins and six straight overall against the Browns, the Ravens faced their AFC North rivalry. Despite the team's losing record, the Ravens took the game very seriously and were especially concerned about running back Peyton Hillis, who had run all over the team earlier in the year.

In the first quarter the Ravens trailed early as Mohamed Massaquoi threw a 29-yard TD pass to WR Brian Robiskie. Baltimore challenged this play, doubting that a catch was really made in the end zone, but the ruling was upheld. But Baltimore would answer quickly. First, kicker Billy Cundiff nailed a 27-yard field goal. On the following Cleveland possession, the Ravens forced and recovered a fumble, followed by QB Joe Flacco completing a 15-yard TD pass to T. J. Houshmandzadeh. Later, Ed Reed intercepted a pass, the second Browns interception of the game, leading to a 40-yard Cundiff field goal. The lead was narrowed when kicker Phil Dawson got a 30-yard field goal at the end of the half. The Ravens cushioned their lead early in the third quarter with Flacco getting a 22-yard TD pass to WR Derrick Mason, making the score 20–10, as it would conclude.

With the win, the Ravens improved to 11–4, and were able to clinch their first third consecutive playoff berth.

==== Week 17: vs. Cincinnati Bengals ====
Week 17: Cincinnati Bengals at Baltimore Ravens – Game summary

Quarter	1	2	3	4	Total
Bengals	0	0	0	7	7
Ravens	3	3	7	0	13

at M&T Bank Stadium, Baltimore, Maryland

- Date: January 2
- Game time: 1:00 pm. EST
- Game weather: 51 °F (11 °C) (Cloudy)
- Game attendance: 71,088
- Referee: Peter Morelli
- TV announcers (CBS): Kevin Harlan and Solomon Wilcots
- Recap, Gamebook

Game information

First quarter

- BAL – Billy Cundiff 25 yard field goal, Ravens 3–0, Drive: 8 plays, 53 yards, 3:56

Second quarter

- BAL – Billy Cundiff 47 yard field goal, Ravens 6–0, Drive: 7 plays, 48 yards, 3:35

Third quarter

- BAL – Ray Rice 7 yard run (Billy Cundiff kick) Ravens 13–0, Drive: 5 plays, 28 yards, 2:08

Fourth quarter

- CIN – Jerome Simpson 11 yard pass from Carson Palmer (Clint Stitser kick), Ravens 13–7, Drive: 13 plays, 80 yards, 8:23

Top passers

- CIN – Carson Palmer 32/45, 305 yards, 1 touchdown, 2 interceptions
- BAL – Joe Flacco 14/19, 125 yards, 1 touchdown

Top rushers

- CIN – Cedric Benson 21 rushes, 53 yards
- BAL – Ray Rice 20 rushes, 77 yards, 1 touchdown

Top receivers

- CIN -Jerome Simpson 12 receptions, 123 yards
- BAL – Todd Heap 3 receptions, 53 yards

Top tacklers

- CIN – Michael Johnson 6 tackles, 1 assist, 1 sack
- BAL – Ray Lewis 9 tackles, 2 assists

The Ravens' sixteenth game was a division rivalry rematch against the Bengals at home. The Ravens led the game as kicker Billy Cundiff hit a 25 and a 47-yard field goal. This was followed by Ray Rice getting a 7-yard TD run. The lead was narrowed with QB Carson Palmer throwing an 11-yard TD pass to WR Jerome Simpson, but the Ravens held on for the win, closing out the regular season with a 12–4 record. The Ravens entered the game with a guaranteed playoff spot but knowing that if they won and the Steelers lost, they would improve their playoff position in the conference from #5 to #2. While it was presumed Pittsburgh would probably beat the Browns, they were determined to play well.

The Ravens took advantage during the game on turnovers, having forced five in the game. After winning the coin toss and electing to defer, Carson Palmer threw an early interception to Ed Reed, giving the Ravens possession. This resulted in a field goal, giving the Ravens an early 3–0 lead. In the second quarter, Cundiff kicked a second field goal, making it 6–0. At the closing of the first half, the Bengals were driving toward the end zone when Reed made his second interception of the half, thereby preventing the opposition from scoring and sealing a first-half shutout. In the third quarter, the Ravens recovered a fumble from deep within Bengals territory, leading to a Ray Rice touchdown run, making the score 13–0. The only Bengals score was a touchdown in the fourth quarter. The Bengals had some chances toward the end. One drive in the final minutes ended as a turnover on downs, another when Palmer fumbled. But the Cincinnati's defense forced three-and-outs each time. The Bengals' final chance came with no timeout and 45 seconds from deep within their own territory, when they were able to play hurry-up offense and drive the ball to within a few yards of the end zone. But they failed to score, resulting in another turnover on downs with just 10 seconds remaining.

With Pittsburgh winning, the Ravens did not gain anything in the playoff standings. Nevertheless, they finished the season 12–4, tied for their second best season (the other being their 2000 Super Bowl winning season) just a game behind their winningest season in 2006 when they finished 13–3.

=== Postseason ===
Round	Date	Opponent (seed)	Result	Record	Venue
Wild Card	January 9, 2011	at Kansas City Chiefs (4)	W 30–7	13–4	Arrowhead Stadium
Divisional	January 15, 2011	at Pittsburgh Steelers (2)	L 24–31	13–5	Heinz Field

==== AFC Wild Card Round: at Kansas City Chiefs ====
AFC Wild Card Round: Baltimore Ravens at Kansas City Chiefs – Game summary

Quarter	1	2	3	4	Total
Ravens	3	7	13	7	30
Chiefs	7	0	0	0	7

at Arrowhead Stadium, Kansas City, Missouri

- Date: January 9, 2011
- Game time: 1:00 pm. EDT
- Game weather: 26 °F (−3 °C) (Cloudy)
- Game attendance: 72,190
- Referee: Mike Carey
- TV announcers (CBS): Jim Nantz and Phil Simms
- Recap, Gamebook

Game information

First quarter

- BAL – Billy Cundiff 19 yard field goal, Ravens 3–0, Drive: 14 plays, 69 yards, 5:59.
- KC – Jamaal Charles 41 yard run (Ryan Succop kick), Chiefs 7–3, Drive: 2 plays, 46 yards, 0:49.

Second quarter

- BAL – Ray Rice 9 yard pass form Joe Flacco (Billy Cundiff kick), Ravens 10–7, Drive: 11 plays, 80 yards, 5:30.

Third quarter

- BAL – Billy Cundiff 29 yard field goal, Ravens 13–7, Drive: 7 plays, 51 yards, 3:02.
- BAL – Billy Cundiff 29 yard field goal, Ravens 16–7, Drive: 4 plays, 6 yards, 1:20.
- BAL – Anquan Boldin 4 yard pass form Joe Flacco (Billy Cundiff kick), Ravens 23–7, Drive: 6 plays, 31 yards, 2:59.

Fourth quarter

- BAL – Willis McGahee 25 yard run (Billy Cundiff kick), Ravens 30–7, Drive: 15 plays, 80 yards, 10:20.

Top passers

- BAL – Joe Flacco – 25/34, 265 yards, 2 touchdowns
- KC – Matt Cassel – 9/18, 70 yards, 3 interceptions

Top rushers

- BAL – Ray Rice – 17 rushes, 57 yards
- KC – Jamaal Charles – 9 rushes, 82 yards

Top receivers

- BAL – Todd Heap – 10 receptions, 108 yards
- KC – Tony Moeaki – 1 receptions, 22 yards

Top tacklers

- BAL – Jameel McClain – 4 tackles, 2 assists
- KC – Eric Berry – 9 tackles, 1 assist

Entering the postseason as the AFC's #5 seed, the Ravens began their playoff run at Arrowhead Stadium for the AFC Wild Card Round against the #4 Kansas City Chiefs. Baltimore delivered the game's opening strike with a 19-yard field goal from kicker Billy Cundiff, but the Chiefs answered with running back Jamaal Charles getting a 41-yard touchdown run. The Ravens regained the lead in the second quarter as quarterback Joe Flacco found running back Ray Rice on a 9-yard touchdown pass.

Baltimore added onto their lead in the third quarter with a pair of 29-yard field goals from Cundiff, followed by Flacco connecting with wide receiver Anquan Boldin on a 4-yard touchdown pass. In the fourth quarter, the Ravens pulled away with a 25-yard touchdown run from running back Willis McGahee. This occurred on an offensive drive that burned more than 10 minutes from the clock, nearly sealing a victory.

On Kansas City's final offensive drive, an incomplete pass was followed by two sacks of Matt Cassel. On fourth down, Cassel threw an interception, allowing Baltimore to gain one more first down and then run out the clock.

With the win, Baltimore improved their overall record to 13–4.

==== AFC Divisional Round: at Pittsburgh Steelers ====
AFC Divisional Round: Baltimore Ravens at Pittsburgh Steelers – Game summary

Quarter	1	2	3	4	Total
Ravens	14	7	0	3	24
Steelers	7	0	14	10	31

at Heinz Field, Pittsburgh, Pennsylvania

- Date: January 15, 2011
- Game time: 1:00 pm. EDT
- Game weather: 36 °F (2 °C) (Cloudy)
- Game attendance: 64,879
- Referee: Jeff Triplette
- TV announcers (CBS): Greg Gumbel and Dan Dierdorf
- Recap, Gamebook

Game information

First quarter

- PIT – Rashard Mendenhall 1 yard run (Shaun Suisham kick), Steelers 7–0, Drive: 10 plays, 80 yards, 6:04.
- BAL – Ray Rice 14 yard run (Billy Cundiff kick), Tied 7–7, Drive: 10 plays, 68 yards, 4:58.
- BAL – Cory Redding 13 yard fumble return (Billy Cundiff kick), Ravens 14–7.

Second quarter

- BAL – Todd Heap 4 yard pass form Joe Flacco (Billy Cundiff kick), Ravens 21–7, Drive: 6 plays, 16 yards, 3:02.

Third quarter

- PIT – Heath Miller 9 yard pass form Ben Roethlisberger (Shaun Suisham kick), Ravens 21–14, Drive: 2 plays, 23 yards, 0:53.
- PIT – Hines Ward 8 yard pass form Ben Roethlisberger (Shaun Suisham kick), Tied 21–21, Drive: 4 plays, 25 yards, 2:17.

Fourth quarter

- PIT – Shaun Suisham 35 yard field goal, Steelers 24–21, Drive: 8 plays, 6 yards, 3:49.
- BAL – Billy Cundiff 24 yard field goal, Tied 24–24, Drive: 5 plays, 23 yards, 2:01.
- PIT – Rashard Mendenhall 1 yard run (Shaun Suisham kick), PIT 31–24, Drive: 11 plays, 65 yards, 2:21.

Top passers

- BAL – Joe Flacco – 16/30, 125 yards, 1 touchdown, 2 interceptions
- PIT – Ben Roethlisberger – 19/32, 226 yards, 2 touchdowns

Top rushers

- BAL – Ray Rice – 12 rushes, 32 yards, 1 touchdown
- PIT – Rashard Mendenhall – 20 rushes, 46 yards, 2 touchdowns

Top receivers

- BAL – Todd Heap – 3 receptions, 43 yards, 1 touchdown
- PIT – Hines Ward – 3 receptions, 75 yards

Top tacklers

- BAL – Ray Lewis – 6 tackles, 3 assists
- PIT – Lawrence Timmons – 7 tackles, 2 assists

Coming off their win over the Chiefs, the Ravens flew to Heinz Field for the AFC Divisional Round against their AFC North rival, the #2 Pittsburgh Steelers, for the third time in the season. Baltimore trailed early as Steelers running back Rashard Mendenhall got a 1-yard touchdown run. The Ravens took the lead with a 14-yard touchdown run from running back Ray Rice, followed by a 13-yard fumble return for a touchdown from defensive end Cory Redding. Baltimore added onto their lead in the second quarter as quarterback Joe Flacco found tight end Todd Heap on a 4-yard touchdown pass which gave the Ravens a 21–7 lead at the half.

Pittsburgh struck back and tied the game taking advantage of a few Ravens turnovers. Two quick touchdowns were scored as quarterback Ben Roethlisberger completed a 9-yard touchdown pass to tight end Heath Miller, followed by an 8-yard touchdown pass to wide receiver Hines Ward. The Steelers retook the lead with kicker Shaun Suisham making a 35-yard field goal, yet the Ravens tied the game with a 24-yard field goal from Cundiff. On the Steelers final possession, they converted on a crucial 3rd and 19 with the game tied at 24 to keep their drive alive. Eventually, Pittsburgh got the last score with Mendenhall's 1-yard touchdown run.

With the loss, Baltimore's season came to an end with an overall record of 13–5.

== Standings ==
=== Division ===
AFC North
	W	L	T	PCT	DIV	CONF	PF	PA	STK
^{(2)} Pittsburgh Steelers	12	4	0	.750	5–1	9–3	375	232	W2
^{(5)} Baltimore Ravens	12	4	0	.750	4–2	9–3	357	270	W4
Cleveland Browns	5	11	0	.313	1–5	3–9	271	332	L4
Cincinnati Bengals	4	12	0	.250	2–4	3–9	322	395	L1

=== Conference ===
AFC
#	Team	Division	W	L	T	PCT	DIV	CONF	SOS	SOV	STK
Division winners
1	New England Patriots	East	14	2	0	.875	5–1	10–2	.504	.504	W8
2 (Note: Pittsburgh clinched the AFC North title instead of Baltimore based on division record (5–1 to Baltimore's 4–2).)	Pittsburgh Steelers	North	12	4	0	.750	5–1	9–3	.500	.417	W2
3 (Note: Indianapolis clinched the AFC No. 3 seed instead of Kansas City based on a head-to-head victory.)	Indianapolis Colts	South	10	6	0	.625	4–2	8–4	.473	.425	W4
4	Kansas City Chiefs	West	10	6	0	.625	2–4	6–6	.414	.381	L1
Wild cards
5	Baltimore Ravens	North	12	4	0	.750	4–2	9–3	.484	.422	W4
6	New York Jets	East	11	5	0	.688	4–2	9–3	.492	.409	W1
Did not qualify for the postseason
7	San Diego Chargers	West	9	7	0	.563	3–3	7–5	.457	.410	W1
8 (Note: Jacksonville finished ahead of Oakland based on head-to-head victory.)	Jacksonville Jaguars	South	8	8	0	.500	3–3	7–5	.453	.383	L3
9	Oakland Raiders	West	8	8	0	.500	6–0	6–6	.469	.469	W1
10	Miami Dolphins	East	7	9	0	.438	2–4	5–7	.539	.438	L3
11 (Note: Houston finished ahead of Tennessee in the AFC South based on division record (3–3 to Tennessee's 2–4).)	Houston Texans	South	6	10	0	.375	3–3	5–7	.523	.500	W1
12	Tennessee Titans	South	6	10	0	.375	2–4	3–9	.508	.500	L2
13	Cleveland Browns	North	5	11	0	.313	1–5	3–9	.570	.475	L4
14 (Note: Denver finished ahead of Buffalo and Cincinnati based on strength of victory.)	Denver Broncos	West	4	12	0	.250	1–5	3–9	.516	.453	L1
15 (Note: Buffalo finished ahead of Cincinnati based on head-to-head victory.)	Buffalo Bills	East	4	12	0	.250	1–5	3–9	.578	.344	L2
16	Cincinnati Bengals	North	4	12	0	.250	2–4	3–9	.582	.438	L1
Tiebreakers (Note: When breaking ties for three or more teams under the NFL's rules, they are first broken within divisions, then comparing only the highest ranked remaining team from each division.)
