= Daniel Sanders (American football) =

American football player (born 1986)

Profile
- Position: Center / Guard

Personal information
- Born: February 3, 1986 (age 40); Oceanside, California
- Listed height: 6 ft 2 in (1.88 m)
- Listed weight: 320 lb (145 kg)

Career information
- College: Colorado
- NFL draft: 2009: undrafted

Career history
- St. Louis Rams (2009)*; Baltimore Ravens (2010)
- * Offseason or practice squad member only

Daniel Sanders (born February 3, 1986) is an American former football center. He was signed by the St. Louis Rams as an undrafted free agent in 2009. He played college football at Colorado.

== Professional career ==
=== St. Louis Rams ===
He was signed as an undrafted free agent after the 2009 NFL draft by the St. Louis Rams, but did not make an appearance during the 2009 NFL season.

=== Baltimore Ravens ===
On January 21, 2010, Sanders was signed to a future/reserves contract with the Baltimore Ravens. He was waived on June 17. He was re-signed on August 1.
