= 2004 Tennessee Titans season =

45th season in franchise history

- Owner: Bud Adams
- General manager: Floyd Reese
- Head coach: Jeff Fisher
- Home stadium: The Coliseum

Results
- Record: 5–11
- Division place: 4th AFC South
- Playoffs: Did not qualify
- Pro Bowlers: None

The 2004 Tennessee Titans season was the franchise's 35th season in the National Football League (NFL), their 45th overall and their eighth in the state of Tennessee. The Titans attempted to improve upon their previous output of 12–4, but only managed to win five games for the season. The Titans missed the playoffs for the first time since 2001, and this was their worst record since 1994 when they were still based in Houston.

The season is notable when the team lost three starters from the famed 1999 team; lineman Jevon Kearse went to the Philadelphia Eagles, running back Eddie George was released before the season, and would later sign with the Dallas Cowboys, while tight end Frank Wycheck retired after the 2003 season.

== Personnel ==
=== Staff ===
2004 Tennessee Titans staff
Front office: Founder/owner/chairman of the board/president/CEO – Bud Adams; Executive VP/general manager/director of football operations – Floyd Reese; Director of player personnel – Rich Snead; Director of college scouting – Mike Ackerley; National coordinator of college scouting – C. O. Brocato; Director of pro scouting – Al Smith; Head coaches: Executive vice president/head coach – Jeff Fisher; Assistant head coach/offense – George Henshaw; Offensive coaches: Offensive coordinator – Mike Heimerdinger; Quarterbacks – Craig Johnson; Running backs – Sherman Smith; Wide receivers – Steve Walters; Offensive line – Mike Munchak; Offensive assistant/quality control – Ned James	Defensive coaches: Defensive coordinator – Jim Schwartz; Defensive line – Jim Washburn; Linebackers – Dave McGinnis; Defensive backs – Everett Withers; Safeties and nickel backs – Chuck Cecil; Special teams coaches: Special teams – Alan Lowry; Strength and conditioning: Strength and conditioning – Steve Watterson

=== Roster ===
2004 Tennessee Titans roster
Quarterbacks (QB): 12 Doug Johnson; 9 Steve McNair; 7 Billy Volek; Running backs (RB): 29 Chris Brown; 44 Troy Fleming; 35 Robert Holcombe FB; 32 Antowain Smith; Wide receivers (WR): 83 Drew Bennett; 82 Eddie Berlin; 80 Darrell Hill; 85 Derrick Mason; 81 Jason McAddley; Tight ends (TE): 88 Erron Kinney; 84 Shad Meier; 86 Ben Troupe	Offensive linemen (OL): 64 Eugene Amano C; 60 Jacob Bell G; 77 Justin Hartwig C; 72 Brad Hopkins T; 76 Jason Mathews T; 71 Fred Miller T; 75 Benji Olson G; 61 Marico Portis G; 78 Todd Williams G; Defensive linemen (DL): 93 Kevin Carter DE; 96 Jared Clauss DT; 97 Carlos Hall DE; 92 Albert Haynesworth DT; 91 Travis LaBoy DE; 99 Rien Long DT; 98 Antwan Odom DE; 95 Bo Schobel DE; 90 Randy Starks DT; 94 Juqua Thomas DE	Linebackers (LB): 50 Rocky Boiman OLB; 53 Keith Bulluck OLB; 52 Justin Ena OLB; 55 Brad Kassell MLB; 57 Jordan Kramer MLB; 51 Robert Reynolds OLB; 56 Cody Spencer OLB; Defensive backs (DB): 24 Tony Beckham CB; 22 Andre Dyson CB; 30 Rich Gardner CB; 42 Scott McGarrahan SS; 23 Donnie Nickey SS; 21 Samari Rolle CB; 31 Lance Schulters FS; 28 Lamont Thompson FS; 36 Michael Waddell CB; Special teams (ST): 58 Ken Amato LS; 1 Gary Anderson K; 15 Craig Hentrich P	Practice squad: 41 Norman LeJeune S; 33 Jarrett Payton RB; 67 Brent Swaggert OT; Reserve: 87 Tyrone Calico WR (IR); 54 Rocky Calmus LB (IR); 68 Matt Martin T (IR); 6 Joe Nedney K (IR); 69 Zach Piller G (IR); 40 Justin Sandy S (IR); 59 Peter Sirmon LB (IR); 25 Tank Williams S (IR); 26 Andre Woolfolk CB (IR); Rookies in italics 53 active, 9 reserve, 3 practice squad

== Schedule ==
=== Preseason ===
Week	Date	Opponent	Result	Record
1	August 14	Cleveland Browns	**W** 24–3	1–0
2	August 21	at Buffalo Bills	**W** 16–15	2–0
3	August 30	at Dallas Cowboys	**L** 17–20	2–1
4	September 3	Green Bay Packers	**W** 27–7	3–1

=== Regular season ===
In addition to their regular games with AFC South division rivals, the Titans played games against the AFC West and NFC North according to the NFL’s schedule rotation, and also played games against the Miami Dolphins and the Cincinnati Bengals based upon finishing positions from 2003. The Christmas Day game was the first occasion the franchise had played the Denver Broncos since the Houston Oilers met that team in 1995. This is because between 1978 and 2002 non-divisional conference games were scheduled exclusively based upon the preceding season’s finish without any rotary cycle.

Week	Date	Opponent	Result	Attendance	Record
1	September 11	at Miami Dolphins	**W** 17–7	69,987	1–0
2	September 19	**Indianapolis Colts**	**L** 17–31	68,932	1–1
3	September 26	**Jacksonville Jaguars**	**L** 12–15	68,932	1–2
4	October 3	at San Diego Chargers	**L** 17–38	54,006	1–3
5	October 11	at Green Bay Packers	**W** 48–27	70,420	2–3
6	October 17	**Houston Texans**	**L** 10–20	68,932	2–4
7	October 24	at Minnesota Vikings	**L** 3–20	64,108	2–5
8	October 31	Cincinnati Bengals	**W** 27–20	68,932	3–5
9	Bye				
10	November 14	Chicago Bears	**L** 17–19 (OT)	68,932	3–6
11	November 21	at **Jacksonville Jaguars**	**W** 18–15	69,703	4–6
12	November 28	at **Houston Texans**	**L** 21–31	70,721	4–7
13	December 5	at **Indianapolis Colts**	**L** 24–51	57,278	4–8
14	December 13	Kansas City Chiefs	**L** 38–49	68,932	4–9
15	December 19	at Oakland Raiders	**L** 35–40	44,299	4–10
16	December 25	Denver Broncos	**L** 16–37	68,809	4–11
17	January 2	Detroit Lions	**W** 24–19	68,809	5–11
Note: Intra-division opponents are in **bold** text

== Standings ==
AFC South
	W	L	T	PCT	DIV	CONF	PF	PA	STK
^{(3)} Indianapolis Colts	12	4	0	.750	5–1	8–4	522	351	L1
Jacksonville Jaguars	9	7	0	.563	2–4	6–6	261	280	W1
Houston Texans	7	9	0	.438	4–2	6–6	309	339	L1
Tennessee Titans	5	11	0	.313	1–5	3–9	344	439	W1

AFC
#	Team	Division	W	L	T	PCT	DIV	CONF	SOS	SOV	STK
Division leaders
1	Pittsburgh Steelers	North	15	1	0	.938	5–1	11–1	.484	.479	W14
2	New England Patriots	East	14	2	0	.875	5–1	10–2	.492	.478	W2
3 (Note: Indianapolis clinched the AFC #3 seed instead of San Diego based upon head-to-head victory.)	Indianapolis Colts	South	12	4	0	.750	5–1	8–4	.500	.458	L1
4	San Diego Chargers	West	12	4	0	.750	5–1	9–3	.477	.411	W1
Wild cards
5 (Note: New York Jets clinched the AFC #5 seed instead of Denver based upon better record against common opponents (New York Jets were 5–0 to Denver’s 3–2 against San Diego, Cincinnati, Houston, and Miami).)	New York Jets	East	10	6	0	.625	3–3	7–5	.523	.406	L2
6	Denver Broncos	West	10	6	0	.625	3–3	7–5	.484	.450	W2
Did not qualify for the postseason
7 (Note: Jacksonville and Baltimore finished ahead of Buffalo because they each defeated Buffalo head-to-head.) (Note: Jacksonville finished ahead of Baltimore based upon better record against common opponents (Jacksonville were 3–2 against Baltimore’s 2–3 versus Pittsburgh, Indianapolis, Buffalo and Kansas City).)	Jacksonville Jaguars	South	9	7	0	.563	2–4	6–6	.527	.479	W1
8	Baltimore Ravens	North	9	7	0	.563	3–3	6–6	.551	.472	W1
9	Buffalo Bills	East	9	7	0	.563	3–3	5–7	.512	.382	L1
10	Cincinnati Bengals	North	8	8	0	.500	2–4	4–8	.543	.453	W2
11 (Note: Houston finished ahead of Kansas City based upon head-to-head victory.)	Houston Texans	South	7	9	0	.438	4–2	6–6	.504	.402	L1
12	Kansas City Chiefs	West	7	9	0	.438	3–3	6–6	.551	.509	L1
13 (Note: Oakland finished ahead of Tennessee based upon head-to-head victory.)	Oakland Raiders	West	5	11	0	.313	1–5	3–9	.570	.450	L2
14	Tennessee Titans	South	5	11	0	.313	1–5	3–9	.512	.463	W1
15 (Note: Miami finished ahead of Cleveland based upon head-to-head victory.)	Miami Dolphins	East	4	12	0	.250	1–5	2–10	.555	.438	L1
16	Cleveland Browns	North	4	12	0	.250	1–5	3–9	.590	.469	W1
Tiebreakers (Note: When breaking ties for three or more teams under the NFL's rules, they are first broken within divisions, then comparing only the highest-ranked remaining team from each division.)
