= Robert Holcombe =

American football player (born 1975)

No. 25, 35, 39
- Positions: Running back Fullback

Personal information
- Born: December 11, 1975 (age 50); Houston, Texas, U.S.
- Listed height: 5 ft 11 in (1.80 m)
- Listed weight: 208 lb (94 kg)

Career information
- High school: Mesa (Mesa, Arizona)
- College: Illinois
- NFL draft: 1998: 2nd round, 37th overall pick

Career history
- St. Louis Rams (1998–2001); Tennessee Titans (2002–2004); Kansas City Chiefs (2005)*
- * Offseason or practice squad member only

Awards and highlights
- Super Bowl champion (XXXIV); St. Louis Rams 10th Anniversary Team; Second-team All-Big Ten (1996)

Career NFL statistics
- Rushing yards: 1,141
- Rushing average: 3.4
- Rushing touchdowns: 14
- Receptions: 69
- Receiving yards: 573
- Receiving touchdowns: 3
- Stats at Pro Football Reference

Robert Wayne Holcombe (born December 11, 1975) is an American former professional football player who was a fullback for the St. Louis Rams and Tennessee Titans of the National Football League (NFL).

== College ==
Holcombe played running back at Illinois, where he was the school’s all-time leading rusher with 4,105 yards.

== NFL career ==
=== St. Louis Rams ===
Holcombe was drafted 37th overall in the second round of the 1998 NFL draft by the St. Louis Rams. He started at fullback for the 1999 Super Bowl Championship team. Holcombe’s role with the Rams diminished with the emergence of undrafted James Hodgins into the starting fullback role. Holcombe played four seasons for the Rams alongside of NFL MVP, Super Bowl MVP Kurt Warner and NFL MVP Marshall Faulk.

=== Tennessee Titans ===
Holcombe went to the Tennessee Titans after the 2001 season. He played both halfback and fullback for three seasons in the backfield with NFL MVP Steve McNair and Heisman Trophy winner Eddie George. After the 2004 season the Titans released Holcombe along with Derrick Mason, Samari Rolle, and the departure of Steve McNair.

The Chiefs quickly signed him but he was placed on IR (injured reserve) after suffering a preseason knee injury before the 2005 season begun.

== NFL career statistics ==
Year	Team	GP	Rushing						Receiving						Fumbles	
Year	Team	GP	Att	Yds	Avg	Lng	TD	FD	Rec	Yds	Avg	Lng	TD	FD	Fum	Lost
1998	STL	13	98	230	2.3	12	2	14	6	34	5.7	14	0	2	0	0
1999	STL	15	78	294	3.8	34	4	17	14	163	11.6	30	1	9	4	3
2000	STL	14	21	70	3.3	11	3	8	8	90	11.3	19	1	6	0	0
2001	STL	16	13	42	3.2	11	1	5	1	14	14.0	14	0	1	1	1
2002	TEN	8	47	242	5.1	39	0	14	10	91	9.1	18	0	3	1	1
2003	TEN	15	63	201	3.2	21	1	11	19	121	6.4	11	1	4	2	1
2004	TEN	16	17	62	3.6	20	0	3	11	60	5.5	9	0	1	0	0
Career		97	337	1,141	3.4	39	11	72	69	573	8.3	30	3	26	8	6
