= 2005 Tennessee Titans season =

46th season in franchise history; final one with Steve McNair

- Owner: Bud Adams
- General manager: Floyd Reese
- Head coach: Jeff Fisher
- Home stadium: The Coliseum

Results
- Record: 4–12
- Division place: 3rd AFC South
- Playoffs: Did not qualify
- All-Pros: none
- Pro Bowlers: QB Steve McNair; DE Kyle Vanden Bosch

The 2005 Tennessee Titans season was the franchise's 46th season overall, 36th with the National Football League and ninth in Tennessee. The team attempted to improve upon their previous output of 5–11, but was only able to win four games in 2005. The Titans’ games were often high-scoring, with eight of their sixteen games accumulating in excess of 50 points between the two teams.

This was Steve McNair’s final season as a Titan before getting traded to the Baltimore Ravens following the season.

== Offseason ==
=== NFL draft ===
2005 Tennessee Titans draft
Round	Pick	Player	Position	College	Notes
1	6	Adam Jones *	Cornerback	West Virginia	
2	41	Michael Roos *	Offensive tackle	Eastern Washington	
3	68	Courtney Roby	Wide receiver	Indiana	
3	96	Brandon Jones	Wide receiver	Oklahoma	
4	108	Vincent Fuller	Safety	Virginia Tech	
4	113	David Stewart	Offensive tackle	Mississippi Stae	
4	136	Roydell Williams	Wide receiver	Tulane	
5	142	Damien Nash	Running back	Missouri	
5	150	Daniel Loper	Offensive tackle	Texas Tech	
6	179	Bo Scaife	Tight end	Texas	
7	218	Reynaldo Hill	Cornerback	Florida	
Made roster * Made at least one Pro Bowl during career

=== Undrafted free agents ===
2005 undrafted free agents of note
Player	Position	College
Gino Guidugli	Quarterback	Cincinnati

== Personnel ==
=== Staff ===
2005 Tennessee Titans staff
Front office: Founder/owner/chairman of the board/president/CEO – Bud Adams; Executive VP/general manager/director of football operations – Floyd Reese; Director of player personnel – Rich Snead; Director of college scouting – Mike Ackerley; National coordinator of college scouting – C. O. Brocato; Director of pro scouting – Al Smith; Head coaches: Executive vice president/head coach – Jeff Fisher; Assistant head coach/offense – George Henshaw; Assistant head coach/linebackers – Dave McGinnis; Assistant head coach – Steve Watterson; Offensive coaches: Offensive coordinator – Norm Chow; Quarterbacks – Craig Johnson; Running backs – Sherman Smith; Wide receivers – Ray Sherman; Offensive line – Mike Munchak; Offensive assistant/quality control – Ned James	Defensive coaches: Defensive coordinator – Jim Schwartz; Defensive line - Jim Washburn; Defensive backs – Everett Withers; Safeties and nickel backs – Chuck Cecil; Special teams coaches: Special teams – Alan Lowry; Assistant special teams – Marty Galbraith; Strength and conditioning: Strength and conditioning – Steve Watterson

=== Roster ===
2005 Tennessee Titans roster
Quarterbacks (QB): 8 Matt Mauck; 9 Steve McNair; 7 Billy Volek; Running backs (RB): 29 Chris Brown; 44 Troy Fleming FB; 20 Travis Henry; 42 Damien Nash; 33 Jarrett Payton; Wide receivers (WR): 83 Drew Bennett; 82 Courtney Roby; 18 O. J. Small; 19 Bobby Wade; Tight ends (TE): 85 Gregg Guenther; 88 Erron Kinney; 80 Bo Scaife; 84 Ben Troupe	Offensive linemen (OL): 54 Eugene Amano C; 60 Jacob Bell G; 77 Justin Hartwig C; 72 Brad Hopkins T; 70 Daniel Loper T; 75 Benji Olson G; 69 Zach Piller G; 71 Michael Roos T; 76 David Stewart T; Defensive linemen (DL): 96 Jared Clauss DT; 92 Albert Haynesworth DT; 91 Travis LaBoy DE; 99 Rien Long DT; 98 Antwan Odom DE; 95 Bo Schobel DE; 90 Randy Starks DT; 93 Kyle Vanden Bosch DE; 79 Marcus White DT	Linebackers (LB): 50 Rocky Boiman OLB; 53 Keith Bulluck OLB; 55 Brad Kassell MLB; 51 Robert Reynolds OLB; 59 Peter Sirmon OLB; 56 Cody Spencer MLB; Defensive backs (DB): 24 Tony Beckham CB; 30 Rich Gardner CB; 21 Reynaldo Hill CB; 32 Adam Jones CB; 23 Donnie Nickey SS; 31 Marcus Randall FS; 28 Lamont Thompson FS; 36 Michael Waddell CB; 25 Tank Williams SS; 26 Andre Woolfolk CB; Special teams (ST): 2 Rob Bironas K; 57 Jon Dorenbos LS; 15 Craig Hentrich P	Practice squad: 10 Justin Anderson WR; 41 Antoine Harris CB; 67 Otis Leverette DE; 52 Jared Newberry LB; 61 Joel Rodriguez C; 40 Justin Sandy S; 16 Sloan Thomas WR; Reserve: 58 Ken Amato LS (IR); 87 Tyrone Calico WR (IR); 22 Vincent Fuller S (IR); 73 Shawn Johnson DE (IR); 81 Brandon Jones WR (IR); 86 Roydell Williams WR (IR); Rookies in italics 53 active, 6 reserve, 7 practice squad

== Schedule ==
=== Preseason ===
Week	Date	Opponent	Result	Record	Venue
1	August 12	Tampa Bay Buccaneers	**L** 17–20	0–1	The Coliseum
2	August 19	at Atlanta Falcons	**W** 24–21	1–1	Georgia Dome
3	August 26	at San Francisco 49ers	**L** 13–16	1–2	Monster Park
4	September 1	Green Bay Packers	**L** 17–21	1–3	The Coliseum

=== Regular season ===
In addition to their regular games with AFC South rivals, the Titans played teams from the AFC North and NFC West as per the schedule rotation, and also played intraconference games against the Raiders and the Dolphins based on divisional positions from 2004.

Week	Date	Opponent	Result	Record	Venue	Attendance
1	September 11	at Pittsburgh Steelers	**L** 7–34	0–1	Heinz Field	62,931
2	September 18	Baltimore Ravens	**W** 25–10	1–1	The Coliseum	69,149
3	September 25	at St. Louis Rams	**L** 27–31	1–2	Edward Jones Dome	65,835
4	October 2	**Indianapolis Colts**	**L** 10–31	1–3	The Coliseum	69,149
5	October 9	at **Houston Texans**	**W** 34–20	2–3	Reliant Stadium	70,430
6	October 16	Cincinnati Bengals	**L** 23–31	2–4	The Coliseum	69,149
7	October 23	at Arizona Cardinals	**L** 10–20	2–5	Sun Devil Stadium	39,482
8	October 30	Oakland Raiders	**L** 25–34	2–6	The Coliseum	69,149
9	November 6	at Cleveland Browns	**L** 14–20	2–7	Cleveland Browns Stadium	72,594
10	Bye					
11	November 20	**Jacksonville Jaguars**	**L** 28–31	2–8	The Coliseum	69,149
12	November 27	San Francisco 49ers	**W** 33–22	3–8	The Coliseum	69,149
13	December 4	at **Indianapolis Colts**	**L** 3–35	3–9	RCA Dome	57,228
14	December 11	**Houston Texans**	**W** 13–10	4–9	The Coliseum	69,149
15	December 18	Seattle Seahawks	**L** 24–28	4–10	The Coliseum	69,149
16	December 24	at Miami Dolphins	**L** 10–24	4–11	Dolphins Stadium	72,001
17	January 1	at **Jacksonville Jaguars**	**L** 13–40	4–12	Alltel Stadium	65,485

Note: Divisional opponents are in bold text

=== Standings ===
AFC South
	W	L	T	PCT	DIV	CONF	PF	PA	STK
^{(1)} Indianapolis Colts	14	2	0	.875	6–0	11–1	439	247	W1
^{(5)} Jacksonville Jaguars	12	4	0	.750	4–2	9–3	361	269	W3
Tennessee Titans	4	12	0	.250	2–4	3–9	299	421	L3
Houston Texans	2	14	0	.125	0–6	1–11	260	431	L2

== Images ==
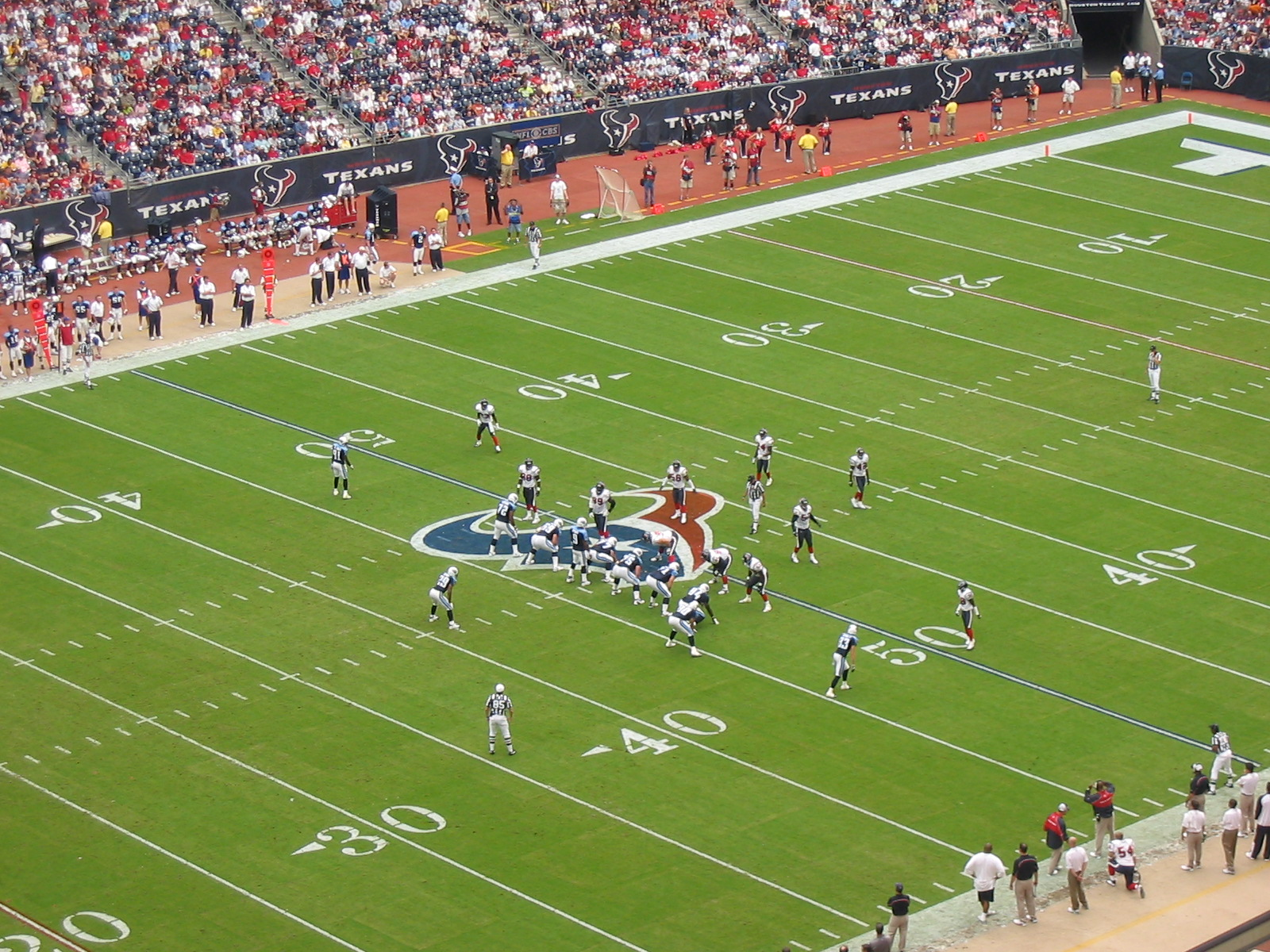
The Titans visit the Houston Texans, October 9, 2005
