= 2003 Tennessee Titans season =

44th season in franchise history

- Owner: Bud Adams
- General manager: Floyd Reese
- Head coach: Jeff Fisher
- Home stadium: The Coliseum

Results
- Record: 12–4
- Division place: 2nd AFC South
- Playoffs: Won Wild Card Playoffs (at Ravens) 20–17; Lost Divisional Playoffs (at Patriots) 14–17
- Pro Bowlers: 5: QB Steve McNair; WR Derrick Mason; OT Brad Hopkins; LB Keith Bulluck; P Craig Hentrich

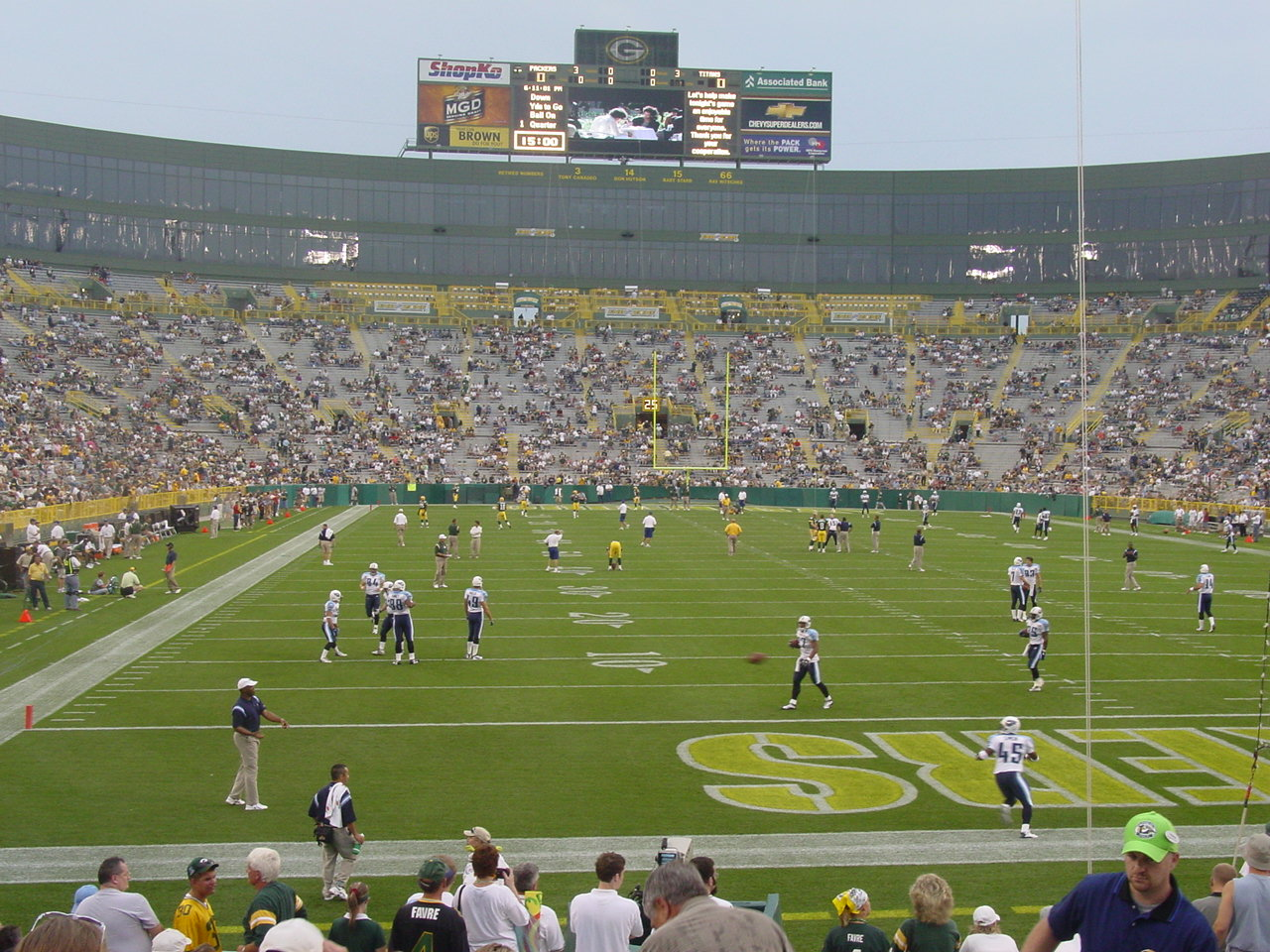
Tennessee at Green Bay's Lambeau Field prior to a preseason game, August 28, 2003

The 2003 Tennessee Titans season was the team's 44th season and their 34th in the National Football League. At 12–4 the Titans posted the 15th season with at least ten wins in the franchise's history dating to their Houston Oilers days. Quarterback Steve McNair threw for 3,215 yards and 24 touchdowns to just seven interceptions; he also rushed for 138 yards and four touchdowns, all despite missing two games to injury, and was named the NFL's co-MVP with Peyton Manning of the Titans' division arch-rival Indianapolis Colts. Eddie George rushed for 1,031 yards and five touchdowns while Derrick Mason had 1,303 receiving yards and eight touchdowns. Justin McCareins had 586 punt/kick return yards and a return touchdown.

This was the last season that the Titans won a playoff game until 2017.

== Personnel ==
=== Staff ===
2003 Tennessee Titans staff
Front office: Founder/owner/chairman of the board/CEO – Bud Adams; President/chief operating officer – Jeff Diamond; Executive VP/general manager/director of football operations – Floyd Reese; Director of player personnel – Rich Snead; Director of college scouting – Mike Ackerley; National coordinator of college scouting – C. O. Brocato; Director of pro scouting – Al Smith; Head coaches: Executive vice president/head coach – Jeff Fisher; Assistant head coach/offense – George Henshaw; Assistant head coach – Gunther Cunningham; Offensive coaches: Offensive coordinator – Mike Heimerdinger; Quarterbacks – Craig Johnson; Running backs – Sherman Smith; Wide receivers – Steve Walters; Offensive line – Mike Munchak; Offensive assistant/quality control – Ned James	Defensive coaches: Defensive coordinator – Jim Schwartz; Defensive line – Jim Washburn; Linebackers – Gunther Cunningham; Defensive backs – Everett Withers; Defensive assistant/quality control – Chuck Cecil; Special teams coaches: Special teams – Alan Lowry; Strength and conditioning: Strength and conditioning – Steve Watterson; Assistant strength and conditioning – Sammy Cribb

=== Roster ===
2003 Tennessee Titans roster
Quarterbacks (QB): 13 Jason Gesser; 9 Steve McNair; 14 Neil O'Donnell; Running backs (RB): 29 Chris Brown; 27 Eddie George; 35 Robert Holcombe FB; 33 Ray Jackson; Wide receivers (WR): 83 Drew Bennett; 82 Eddie Berlin; 87 Tyrone Calico; 80 Darrell Hill; 85 Derrick Mason; 86 Justin McCareins; 81 Jake Schifino; Tight ends (TE): 88 Erron Kinney; 84 Shad Meier; 89 Frank Wycheck	Offensive linemen (OL): 67 Tom Ackerman C; 77 Justin Hartwig C; 72 Brad Hopkins T; 68 Matt Martin T; 76 Jason Mathews T; 71 Fred Miller T; 75 Benji Olson G; 69 Zach Piller G; 78 Todd Williams G; Defensive linemen (DL): 96 James Atkins DT; 93 Kevin Carter DE; 97 Carlos Hall DE; 92 Albert Haynesworth DT; 90 Jevon Kearse DE; 99 Rien Long DT; 98 Robaire Smith DT; 94 Juqua Thomas DE	Linebackers (LB): 50 Rocky Boiman OLB; 53 Keith Bulluck OLB; 54 Rocky Calmus MLB; 55 Brad Kassell MLB; 57 Jordan Kramer MLB; 59 Peter Sirmon OLB; 56 Ray Wells OLB; Defensive backs (DB): 24 Tony Beckham CB; 22 Andre Dyson CB; 20 Mike Echols CB; 42 Scott McGarrahan SS; 23 Donnie Nickey SS; 21 Samari Rolle CB; 31 Lance Schulters FS; 37 Lamont Thompson FS; 25 Tank Williams SS; Special teams (ST): 58 Ken Amato LS; 1 Gary Anderson K; 15 Craig Hentrich P	Practice squad: 47 Dwayne Blakley TE; 39 Brandon Drumm FB; 91 Anthony Dunn DE; 17 Jimmy Fryzel WR; 19 Jermaine Lewis WR; 36 Steve Smith CB (PS/I); Reserve: 6 Joe Nedney K (IR); 7 Billy Volek QB (IR); 26 Andre Woolfolk CB (IR); -- Thomas Wright S (IR); Rookies in italics 53 active, 5 reserve, 5 practice squad

== Schedule ==
=== Preseason ===
Week	Date	Opponent	Result	Record
1	August 9, 2003	Cleveland Browns	**W** 10–6	1–0
2	August 16, 2003	Buffalo Bills	**W** 37–24	2–0
3	August 23, 2003	at Cincinnati Bengals	**W** 23–15	3–0
4	August 28, 2003	at Green Bay Packers	**W** 27–3	4–0

=== Regular season ===
Week	Date	Opponent	Result	Record	Attendance
1	September 7	Oakland Raiders	W 25–20	1–0	68,809
2	September 14	at **Indianapolis Colts**	L 7–33	1–1	56,999
3	September 21	New Orleans Saints	W 27–12	2–1	68,809
4	September 28	at Pittsburgh Steelers	W 30–13	3–1	63,244
5	October 5	at New England Patriots	L 30–38	3–2	68,436
6	October 12	**Houston Texans**	W 38–17	4–2	68,809
7	October 19	at Carolina Panthers	W 37–17	5–2	72,851
8	October 26	at **Jacksonville Jaguars**	W 30–17	6–2	55,918
9	Bye				
10	November 9	Miami Dolphins	W 31–7	7–2	68,809
11	November 16	**Jacksonville Jaguars**	W 10–3	8–2	68,809
12	November 23	at Atlanta Falcons	W 38–31	9–2	70,891
13	December 1	at New York Jets	L 17–24	9–3	77,710
14	December 7	**Indianapolis Colts**	L 27–29	9–4	68,809
15	December 14	Buffalo Bills	W 28–26	10–4	68,809
16	December 21	at **Houston Texans**	W 27–24	11–4	70,758
17	December 28	Tampa Bay Buccaneers	W 33–13	12–4	68,809

Note: Division opponents are in bold text

=== Standings ===
AFC South
	W	L	T	PCT	DIV	CONF	PF	PA	STK
^{(3)} Indianapolis Colts	12	4	0	.750	5–1	9–3	447	336	W1
^{(5)} Tennessee Titans	12	4	0	.750	4–2	8–4	435	324	W3
Jacksonville Jaguars	5	11	0	.313	2–4	3–9	276	331	L1
Houston Texans	5	11	0	.313	1–5	3–9	255	380	L4

== Game summaries ==
=== Week 1 vs. Oakland Raiders ===
Week 1: Oakland Raiders at Tennessee Titans – Game summary

Quarter	1	2	3	4	Total
Raiders	3	7	0	10	20
Titans	6	6	3	10	25

at The Coliseum, Nashville, Tennessee

- Date: September 7
- Game time: 7:30 p.m. CDT
- Game weather: Partly Cloudy, 75 °F (23.9 °C)
- Game attendance: 68,809
- Referee: Ron Blum
- TV announcers (ESPN): Mike Patrick, Joe Theismann, Paul Maguire and Suzy Kolber
- Recap, Game Book

Game information

First quarter

- TEN – Tyrone Calico 11-yard pass from Steve McNair (kick failed, hit left upright), 6:47. Titans 6–0. Drive: 7 plays, 90 yards, 4:18.
- OAK – Sebastian Janikowski 47-yard field goal, 1:29. Titans 6–3. Drive: 4 plays, 4 yards, 2:53.

Second quarter

- TEN – Joe Nedney 50-yard field goal, 8:32. Titans 9–3. Drive: 8 plays, 19 yards, 4:06.
- OAK – Charlie Garner 46-yard pass from Rich Gannon (Sebastian Janikowski kick), 1:06. Raiders 10–9. Drive: 7 plays, 76 yards, 2:49.
- TEN – Craig Hentrich 49-yard field goal, 0:00. Titans 12–10. Drive: 5 plays, 41 yards, 1:06.

Third quarter

- TEN – Craig Hentrich 34-yard field goal, 2:52. Titans 15–10. Drive: 11 plays, 64 yards, 5:09.

Fourth quarter

- OAK – Sebastian Janikowski 47-yard field goal, 13:51. Titans 15–13. Drive: 9 plays, 39 yards, 4:01.
- TEN – Derrick Mason 3-yard pass from Steve McNair (Craig Hentrich kick), 7:51. Titans 22–13. Drive: 7 plays, 54 yards, 4:06.
- OAK – Tim Brown 25-yard pass from Rich Gannon (Sebastian Janikowski kick), 3:30. Titans 22–20. Drive: 5 plays, 65 yards, 1:27.
- TEN – Craig Hentrich 33-yard field goal, 0:32. Titans 25–20. Drive: 7 plays, 54 yards, 2:58.

Top passers

- OAK – Rich Gannon – 24/38, 264 yards, 2 TD
- TEN – Steve McNair – 25/38, 269 yards, 2 TD, INT

Top rushers

- OAK – Charlie Garner – 7 rushes, 22 yards
- TEN – Eddie George – 20 rushes, 42 yards

Top receivers

- OAK – Charlie Garner – 8 receptions, 112 yards, TD
- TEN – Derrick Mason – 10 receptions, 99 yards, TD

In a rematch of the 2002 AFC Title Game the Titans got a measure of revenge in a game that featured 28 combined penalties (17 by the notoriously penalty-prone Raiders). The Titans took an early 9–3 lead on a Tyrone Calico touchdown catch (with a missed PAT) and 50-yard field goal from ex-Raider Joe Nedney while the kicker who replaced Nedney in Oakland, Sebastian Janikowski, drilled a 47-yarder in the first quarter. Nedney himself was injured during the game, so Craig Hentrich came off the bench and booted three additional field goals for the Titans. The Raiders kept the game close as Steve McNair managed two touchdown throws and Rich Gannon added two for the Raiders, but Hentrich's 33-yard boot in the final minute sealed a 25–20 Titans win.

=== Week 2 at Indianapolis Colts ===
Week 2: Tennessee Titans at Indianapolis Colts – Game summary

Quarter	1	2	3	4	Total
Titans	0	7	0	0	7
Colts	3	14	3	13	33

at RCA Dome, Indianapolis, Indiana

- Date: September 14
- Game time: 1:00 p.m. EDT/12:00 p.m. CDT
- Game weather: None (indoor stadium)
- Game attendance: 56,999
- Referee: Jeff Triplette
- TV announcers (CBS): Ian Eagle and Solomon Wilcots
- Recap, Game Book

Game information

First quarter

- IND – Mike Vanderjagt 29-yard field goal, 6:06. Colts 3–0. Drive: 12 plays, 73 yards, 6:17.

Second quarter

- TEN – Tyrone Calico 7-yard pass from Steve McNair (Gary Anderson kick), 8:47. Titans 7–3. Drive: 9 plays, 38 yards, 6:02.
- IND – Edgerrin James 2-yard run (Mike Vanderjagt kick), 6:14. Colts 10–7. Drive: 4 plays, 57 yards, 2:33.
- IND – Marvin Harrison 35-yard pass from Peyton Manning (Mike Vanderjagt kick), 0:56. Colts 17–7. Drive: 5 plays, 81 yards, 1:25.

Third quarter

- IND – Mike Vanderjagt 41-yard field goal, 7:42. Colts 20–7. Drive: 4 plays, 3 yards, 0:59.

Fourth quarter

- IND – Mike Vanderjagt 23-yard field goal, 9:26. Colts 23–7. Drive: 14 plays, 57 yards, 7:05.
- IND – Mike Vanderjagt 48-yard field goal, 6:52. Colts 26–7. Drive: 4 plays, -6 yards, 2:12.
- IND – Nick Harper 75-yard interception return (Mike Vanderjagt kick), 0:22. Colts 33–7.

Top passers

- TEN – Steve McNair – 15/24, 138 yards, TD
- IND – Peyton Manning – 14/21, 173 yards, TD

Top rushers

- TEN – Eddie George – 15 rushes, 46 yards
- IND – Edgerrin James – 30 rushes, 120 yards, TD

Top receivers

- TEN – Derrick Mason – 10 receptions, 98 yards
- IND – Marvin Harrison – 3 receptions, 59 yards, TD

Peyton Manning defeated the Titans for the first time in three career starts in a 33–7 rout. Mike Vanderjagt kicked four field goals and Nick Harper snatched a Steve McNair INT and ran it back 75 yards for a fourth-quarter touchdown. The loss put the Titans in an early hole in the AFC South division race.

=== Week 3 vs. New Orleans Saints ===
Week 3: New Orleans Saints at Tennessee Titans – Game summary

Quarter	1	2	3	4	Total
Saints	2	3	0	7	12
Titans	10	3	7	7	27

at The Coliseum, Nashville, Tennessee

- Date: September 21
- Game time: 12:00 p.m. CDT
- Game weather: Partly Cloudy & Warm, 74 °F (23.3 °C)
- Game attendance: 68,809
- Referee: Bill Carollo
- TV announcers (Fox): Ron Pitts and Tim Ryan
- Recap, Game Book

Game information

First quarter

- TEN – Gary Anderson 22-yard field goal, 7:48. Titans 3–0. Drive: 12 plays, 73 yards, 7:12.
- NO – Lamont Thompson tackled in the end zone by James Allen for a safety, 6:03. Titans 3–2
- TEN – Justin McCareins 2-yard pass from Steve McNair (Gary Anderson kick), 1:52. Titans 10–2. Drive: 7 plays, 38 yards, 4:11.

Second quarter

- TEN – Gary Anderson 43-yard field goal, 5:06. Titans 13–2. Drive: 15 plays, 72 yards, 7:50.
- NO – John Carney 31-yard field goal, 1:46. Titans 13–5. Drive: 8 plays, 57 yards, 3:20.

Third quarter

- TEN – Drew Bennett 5-yard pass from Steve McNair (Gary Anderson kick), 10:41. Titans 20–5. Drive: 7 plays, 37 yards, 3:26.

Fourth quarter

- NO – Jerome Pathon 10-yard pass from Aaron Brooks (John Carney kick), 13:23. Titans 20–12. Drive: 9 plays, 79 yards, 5:18.
- TEN – Eddie George 6-yard run (Gary Anderson kick), 6:13. Titans 27–12. Drive: 14 plays, 76 yards, 7:10.

Top passers

- NO – Aaron Brooks – 15/23, 185 yards, TD
- TEN – Steve McNair – 22/33, 252 yards, 2 TD

Top rushers

- NO – Deuce McAllister – 11 rushes, 8 yards
- TEN – Eddie George – 29 rushes, 100 yards, TD

Top receivers

- NO – Jerome Pathon – 4 receptions, 89 yards, TD
- TEN – Drew Bennett – 8 receptions, 105 yards, TD

=== Week 4 at Pittsburgh Steelers ===
Week 4: Tennessee Titans at Pittsburgh Steelers – Game summary

Quarter	1	2	3	4	Total
Titans	0	16	7	7	30
Steelers	3	10	0	0	13

at Heinz Field, Pittsburgh, Pennsylvania

- Date: September 28
- Game time: 1:00 p.m. EDT/12:00 p.m. CDT
- Game weather: Partly Cloudy, 60 °F (15.6 °C)
- Game attendance: 63,244
- Referee: Walt Anderson
- TV announcers (CBS): Gus Johnson and Brent Jones
- Recap, Game Book

Game information

First quarter

- PIT – Jeff Reed 26-yard field goal, 5:43. Steelers 3–0. Drive: 16 plays, 77 yards, 9:17.

Second quarter

- PIT – Amos Zereoue 5-yard run (Jeff Reed kick), 13:53. Steelers 10–0. Drive: 9 plays, 64 yards, 4:53.
- TEN – Tommy Maddox sacked in the end zone by Rocky Boiman for a safety, 9:30. Steelers 10–2
- TEN – Drew Bennett 10-yard pass from Steve McNair (Gary Anderson kick), 7:51. Steelers 10–9. Drive: 3 plays, 55 yards, 1:39.
- PIT – Jeff Reed 23-yard field goal, 2:40. Steelers 13–9. Drive: 10 plays, 55 yards, 5:11.
- TEN – Erron Kinney 1-yard pass from Steve McNair (Gary Anderson kick), 0:26. Titans 16–13. Drive: 2 plays, 1 yard, 0:24.

Third quarter

- TEN – Justin McCareins 29-yard pass from Steve McNair (Gary Anderson kick), 4:33. Titans 23–13. Drive: 9 plays, 80 yards, 5:18.

Fourth quarter

- TEN – Rocky Boiman 60-yard interception return (Gary Anderson kick), 12:46. Titans 30–13.

Top passers

- TEN – Steve McNair – 15/16, 161 yards, 3 TD
- PIT – Tommy Maddox – 31/47, 332 yards, 2 INT

Top rushers

- TEN – Eddie George – 11 rushes, 21 yards
- PIT – Amos Zereoue – 18 rushes, 51 yards, TD

Top receivers

- TEN – Justin McCareins – 5 receptions, 81 yards, TD
- PIT – Hines Ward – 9 receptions, 76 yards

McNair missed only one throw in sixteen attempts, compiling 161 passing yards and three touchdowns. Rocky Boiman added his own touchdown in the fourth quarter by returning a Tommy Maddox interception 60 yards. The Titans triumphed 30–13.

=== Week 5 at New England Patriots ===
Week 5: Tennessee Titans at New England Patriots – Game summary

Quarter	1	2	3	4	Total
Titans	6	7	3	14	30
Patriots	7	0	14	17	38

at Gillette Stadium, Foxborough, Massachusetts

- Date: October 5
- Game time: 1:00 p.m. EDT/12:00 p.m. CDT
- Game weather: Sunny, 53 °F (11.7 °C)
- Game attendance: 68,436
- Referee: Ron Winter
- TV announcers (CBS): Gus Johnson and Brent Jones
- Recap, Game Book

Game information

First quarter

- TEN – Craig Hentrich 48-yard field goal, 10:43. Titans 3–0. Drive: 9 plays, 29 yards, 4:17.
- TEN – Gary Anderson 43-yard field goal, 3:06. Titans 6–0. Drive: 11 plays, 50 yards, 5:48.
- NE – Troy Brown 58-yard pass from Tom Brady (Adam Vinatieri kick), 1:00. Patriots 7–6. Drive: 5 plays, 69 yards, 2:06.

Second quarter

- TEN – Steve McNair 1-yard run (Gary Anderson kick), 1:58. Titans 13–7. Drive: 5 plays, 44 yards, 1:08.

Third quarter

- NE – Antowain Smith 1-yard run (Adam Vinatieri kick), 9:25. Patriots 14–13. Drive: 11 plays, 59 yards, 5:35.
- TEN – Gary Anderson 33-yard field goal, 5:31. Titans 16–14. Drive: 8 plays, 60 yards, 3:54.
- NE – Mike Cloud 1-yard run (Adam Vinatieri kick), 0:58. Patriots 21–16. Drive: 10 plays, 64 yards, 4:33.

Fourth quarter

- TEN – Gary Anderson 37-yard field goal, 13:19. Patriots 21–19. Drive: 6 plays, 50 yards, 2:39.
- NE – Adam Vinatieri 48-yard field goal, 11:47. Patriots 24–19. Drive: 5 plays, 40 yards, 1:32.
- TEN – Steve McNair 1-yard run (Steve McNair–Tyrone Calico pass), 4:40. Titans 27–24. Drive: 17 plays, 86 yards, 7:07.
- NE – Mike Cloud 15-yard run (Adam Vinatieri kick), 3:14. Patriots 31–27. Drive: 4 plays, 30 yards, 1:26.
- NE – Ty Law 65-yard interception return (Adam Vinatieri kick), 1:49. Patriots 38–27.
- TEN – Gary Anderson 41-yard field goal, 0:36. Patriots 38–30. Drive: 6 plays, 54 yards, 1:13.

Top passers

- TEN – Steve McNair – 23/45, 360 yards, INT
- NE – Tom Brady – 17/31, 219 yards, TD

Top rushers

- TEN – Eddie George – 15 rushes, 35 yards
- NE – Antowain Smith – 16 rushes, 80 yards, TD

Top receivers

- TEN – Derrick Mason – 8 receptions, 99 yards
- NE – Deion Branch – 5 receptions, 68 yards

One of the most ferocious games of the season for both clubs, the game lead changed on almost every possession. Two Titans field goals (by Craig Hentrich and Gary Anderson) in the first were followed by a 58-yard Tom Brady touchdown to Troy Brown. Adam Vinatieri missed two field goal tries while Anderson also missed, leaving the halftime score 13–7 Tennessee, but from the start of the second half the two teams erupted as the Patriots behind 153 rushing yards by Antowain Smith and reserve back Mike Cloud scored on all five second-half possessions. McNair rushed in two touchdowns to go with a total of four Anderson field goals, but following McNair's second rushing score and two-point pass to Tyrone Calico a 71-yard Bethel Johnson kick return led to a Mike Cloud touchdown. With the Patriots leading 31–27 McNair was picked off by a hobbled Ty Law for a 65-yard Patriots touchdown. The final Anderson field goal was followed by an onside kick recovered by the Patriots for a 38–30 Titans loss.

=== Week 6 vs. Houston Texans ===
Week 6: Houston Texans at Tennessee Titans – Game summary

Quarter	1	2	3	4	Total
Texans	0	3	7	7	17
Titans	14	7	3	14	38

at The Coliseum, Nashville, Tennessee

- Date: October 12
- Game time: 12:00 p.m. CDT
- Game weather: Mostly Cloudy, 69 °F (20.6 °C)
- Game attendance: 68,809
- Referee: Gerald Austin
- TV announcers (CBS): Don Criqui and Steve Tasker
- Recap, Game Book

Game information

First quarter

- TEN – Derrick Mason 32-yard pass from Steve McNair (Gary Anderson kick), 10:38. Titans 7–0. Drive: 6 plays, 74 yards, 2:53.
- TEN – Derrick Mason 46-yard pass from Steve McNair (Gary Anderson kick), 6:12. Titans 14–0. Drive: 5 plays, 69 yards, 2:45.

Second quarter

- TEN – Robert Holcombe 5-yard run (Gary Anderson kick), 0:57. Titans 21–0. Drive: 9 plays, 88 yards, 4:32.
- HOU – Kris Brown 29-yard field goal, 0:00. Titans 21–3. Drive: 7 plays, 58 yards, 0:57.

Third quarter

- HOU – Corey Bradford 65-yard pass from David Carr (Kris Brown kick), 12:20. Titans 21–10. Drive: 2 plays, 98 yards, 0:56.
- TEN – Gary Anderson 33-yard field goal, 3:44. Titans 24–10. Drive: 8 plays, 38 yards, 3:09.

Fourth quarter

- TEN – Derrick Mason 50-yard pass from Steve McNair (Gary Anderson kick), 14:46. Titans 31–10. Drive: 5 plays, 98 yards, 1:46.
- TEN – Andre Dyson 51-yard interception return (Gary Anderson kick), 13:03. Titans 38–10
- HOU – Derick Armstrong 13-yard pass from David Carr (Kris Brown kick), 9:06. Titans 38–17. Drive: 10 plays, 80 yards, 3:57.

Top passers

- HOU – David Carr – 25/42, 371 yards, 2 TD, 3 INT
- TEN – Steve McNair – 18/27, 421 yards, 3 TD

Top rushers

- HOU – Domanick Davis – 7 rushes, 59 yards
- TEN – Eddie George – 19 rushes, 60 yards

Top receivers

- HOU – Corey Bradford – 5 receptions, 127 yards, TD
- TEN – Derrick Mason – 6 receptions, 177 yards, 3 TD

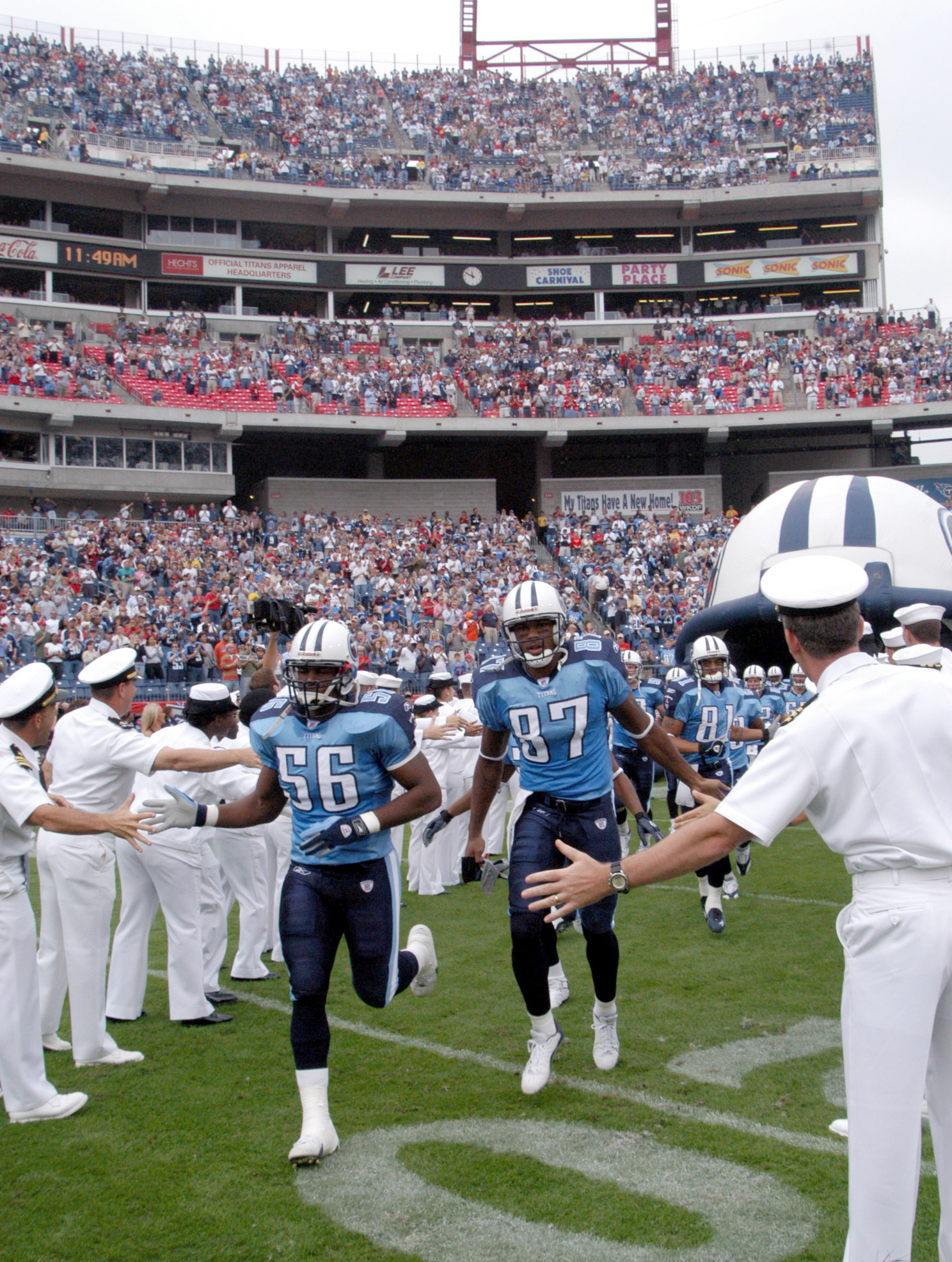
The Titans take the field against the Texans on October 12.

In the first of the two teams' semi-annual "Houston Oilers Bowls" matchups the Titans honored former Oilers defensive end Elvin Bethea during halftime. McNair threw for a career-high 421 yards and three touchdowns in a 38–17 rout of the Texans. David Carr of Houston threw two touchdowns but was picked off three times and Andre Dyson returned one pick for a 51-yard Titans score.

=== Week 7 at Carolina Panthers ===
Week 7: Tennessee Titans at Carolina Panthers – Game summary

Quarter	1	2	3	4	Total
Titans	17	10	0	10	37
Panthers	0	3	0	14	17

at Ericsson Stadium, Charlotte, North Carolina

- Date: October 19
- Game time: 1:00 p.m. EDT/12:00 p.m. CDT
- Game weather: Clear Skies, 67 °F (19.4 °C)
- Game attendance: 72,851
- Referee: Walt Coleman
- TV announcers (CBS): Gus Johnson, Brent Jones and Marcus Allen
- Recap, Game Book

Game information

First quarter

- TEN – Steve McNair 7-yard run (Gary Anderson kick), 12:49. Titans 7–0. Drive: 5 plays, 30 yards, 2:11.
- TEN – Eddie Berlin 50-yard pass from Billy Volek (Gary Anderson kick), 8:09. Titans 14–0. Drive: 7 plays, 71 yards, 3:04.
- TEN – Gary Anderson 40-yard field goal, 4:59. Titans 17–0. Drive: 5 plays, 22 yards, 1:41.

Second quarter

- TEN – Gary Anderson 32-yard field goal, 12:34. Titans 20–0. Drive: 5 plays, 57 yards, 2:22.
- CAR – John Kasay 53-yard field goal, 2:12. Titans 20–3. Drive: 10 plays, 42 yards, 5:06.
- TEN – Drew Bennett 22-yard pass from Steve McNair (Gary Anderson kick), 0:11. Titans 27–3. Drive: 6 plays, 71 yards, 2:01.

Third quarter

- No scoring plays

Fourth quarter

- TEN – Gary Anderson 34-yard field goal, 10:44. Titans 30–3. Drive: 10 plays, 46 yards, 5:10.
- CAR – Steve Smith 67-yard pass from Jake Delhomme (John Kasay kick), 10:30. Titans 30–10. Drive: 1 play, 67 yards, 0:14.
- TEN – Keith Bulluck 32-yard fumble return (Gary Anderson kick), 8:07. Titans 37–10.
- CAR – Nick Goings 8-yard pass from Jake Delhomme (John Kasay kick), 3:37. Titans 37–17. Drive: 10 plays, 94 yards, 1:50.

Top passers

- TEN – Steve McNair – 12/22, 190 yards, TD
- CAR – Jake Delhomme – 31/49, 362 yards, 2 TD

Top rushers

- TEN – Robert Holcombe – 16 rushes, 53 yards
- CAR – Stephen Davis – 11 rushes, 20 yards

Top receivers

- TEN – Drew Bennett – 4 receptions, 97 yards, TD
- CAR – Steve Smith – 10 receptions, 151 yards, TD

A week after the Panthers ended the unbeaten streak of the Indianapolis Colts, the Titans ended Carolina's own win streak in a 37–17 runaway. After rushing in a seven-yard touchdown in the first quarter, Steve McNair gave way to backup Billy Volek on a fake punt; Volek took the snap and threw a 50-yard score to Eddie Berlin. McNair returned to the game and added a touchdown throw to Drew Bennett and Keith Bulluck ran in a 23-yard fumble for a touchdown. Jake Delhomme of the Panthers managed two touchdown throws in his first loss as Panthers starter.

=== Week 8 at Jacksonville Jaguars ===
Week 8: Tennessee Titans at Jacksonville Jaguars – Game summary

Quarter	1	2	3	4	Total
Titans	10	10	7	3	30
Jaguars	0	10	0	7	17

at Alltel Stadium, Jacksonville, Florida

- Date: October 26
- Game time: 1:00 p.m. EST/12:00 p.m. CST
- Game weather: 80 °F (26.7 °C)
- Game attendance: 55,918
- Referee: Terry McAulay
- TV announcers (CBS): Ian Eagle and Solomon Wilcots
- Recap, Game Book

Game information

First quarter

- TEN – Gary Anderson 43-yard field goal, 12:10. Titans 3–0. Drive: 6 plays, 52 yards, 2:50.
- TEN – Eddie George 1-yard run (Gary Anderson kick), 4:33. Titans 10–0. Drive: 9 plays, 71 yards, 5:42.

Second quarter

- JAX – Seth Marler 49-yard field goal, 14:17. Titans 10–3. Drive: 9 plays, 45 yards, 5:16.
- TEN – Tyrone Calico 7-yard pass from Steve McNair (Gary Anderson kick), 7:26. Titans 17–3. Drive: 8 plays, 29 yards, 5:14.
- JAX – Jimmy Smith 49-yard pass from Byron Leftwich (Seth Marler kick), 3:38. Titans 17–10. Drive: 2 plays, 58 yards, 0:49.
- TEN – Gary Anderson 43-yard field goal, 0:01. Titans 20–10. Drive: 11 plays, 45 yards, 3:37.

Third quarter

- TEN – Eddie George 1-yard run (Gary Anderson kick), 8:36. Titans 27–10. Drive: 3 plays, 7 yards, 1:30.

Fourth quarter

- TEN – Gary Anderson 33-yard field goal, 1:47. Titans 30–10. Drive: 17 plays, 65 yards, 11:14.
- JAX – George Wrighster 5-yard pass from David Garrard (Seth Marler kick), 0:05. Titans 30–17. Drive: 12 plays, 86 yards, 1:42.

Top passers

- TEN – Steve McNair – 21/27, 187 yards, TD, INT
- JAX – Byron Leftwich – 15/28, 158 yards, TD, 3 INT

Top rushers

- TEN – Eddie George – 27 rushes, 88 yards, 2 TD
- JAX – Fred Taylor – 9 rushes, 48 yards

Top receivers

- TEN – Drew Bennett – 4 receptions, 48 yards
- JAX – Troy Edwards – 4 receptions, 63 yards

=== Week 10 vs. Miami Dolphins ===
Week 10: Miami Dolphins at Tennessee Titans – Game summary

Quarter	1	2	3	4	Total
Dolphins	0	0	0	7	7
Titans	14	7	7	3	31

at The Coliseum, Nashville, Tennessee

- Date: November 9
- Game time: 12:00 p.m. CST
- Game weather: Mostly Sunny, 49 °F (9.4 °C)
- Game attendance: 68,809
- Referee: Mike Carey
- TV announcers (CBS): Kevin Harlan, Randy Cross, Lesley Visser
- Recap, Game Book

Game information

First quarter

- TEN – Tyrone Calico 12-yard pass from Steve McNair (Gary Anderson kick), 12:00. Titans 7–0. Drive: 6 plays, 69 yards, 3:00.
- TEN – Eddie George 2-yard run (Gary Anderson kick), 1:34. Titans 14–0. Drive: 16 plays, 82 yards, 8:47.

Second quarter

- TEN – Justin McCareins 24-yard pass from Steve McNair (Gary Anderson kick), 1:02. Titans 21–0. Drive: 1 play, 24 yards, 0:09.

Third quarter

- TEN – Andre Dyson 11-yard interception return (Gary Anderson kick), 8:08. Titans 28–0

Fourth quarter

- TEN – Gary Anderson 35-yard field goal, 5:16. Titans 31–0. Drive: 7 plays, 40 yards, 4:24.
- MIA – Donald Lee 21-yard pass from Sage Rosenfels (Olindo Mare kick), 0:20. Titans 31–7. Drive: 5 plays, 59 yards, 1:31.

Top passers

- MIA – Brian Griese – 15/27, 131 yards, 3 INT
- TEN – Steve McNair – 17/23, 201 yards, 2 TD

Top rushers

- MIA – Ricky Williams – 13 rushes, 37 yards
- TEN – Chris Brown – 12 rushes, 46 yards

Top receivers

- MIA – Ricky Williams – 6 receptions, 22 yards
- TEN – Derrick Mason – 6 receptions, 98 yards

The Titans forced three interceptions from Dolphins quarterback Brian Griese and also recovered two Dolphins fumbles en route to a 31–7 win. McNair had two touchdown throws and 223 yards passing while the lone Dolphins score came from future Texans quarterback Sage Rosenfels on a fourth-quarter score to Donald Lee.

=== Week 11 vs. Jacksonville Jaguars ===
Week 11: Jacksonville Jaguars at Tennessee Titans – Game summary

Quarter	1	2	3	4	Total
Jaguars	0	0	0	3	3
Titans	3	7	0	0	10

at The Coliseum, Nashville, Tennessee

- Date: November 16
- Game time: 12:00 p.m. CST
- Game weather: Cloudy & Slight Rain, 60 °F (15.6 °C)
- Game attendance: 68,809
- Referee: Ron Blum
- TV announcers (CBS): Gus Johnson and Brent Jones
- Recap, Game Book

Game information

First quarter

- TEN – Gary Anderson 33-yard field goal, 6:21. Titans 3–0. Drive: 10 plays, 45 yards, 4:35.

Second quarter

- TEN – Justin McCareins 5-yard pass from Steve McNair (Gary Anderson kick), 11:38. Titans 10–0. Drive: 9 plays, 65 yards, 5:01.

Third quarter

- No scoring plays

Fourth quarter

- JAX – Seth Marler 39-yard field goal, 7:51. Titans 10–3. Drive: 11 plays, 36 yards, 5:29.

Top passers

- JAX – Byron Leftwich – 15/31, 151 yards, 2 INT
- TEN – Steve McNair – 13/25, 166 yards, TD, INT

Top rushers

- JAX – Fred Taylor – 14 rushes, 65 yards
- TEN – Eddie George – 20 rushes, 73 yards

Top receivers

- JAX – Troy Edwards – 6 receptions, 67 yards
- TEN – Derrick Mason – 5 receptions, 98 yards

After seven straight games where they scored at least 27 points (six straight with at least 30), the Titans were held to just ten points in a 10–3 win over the Jaguars and their first home game against Jack Del Rio as Jacksonville coach. Gary Anderson booted a 33-yard field goal and Justin McCareins caught a five-yard score from McNair. Jacksonville was limited to a Seth Marler field goal in the fourth as Byron Leftwich was sacked six times and threw two picks.

=== Week 12 at Atlanta Falcons ===
Week 12: Tennessee Titans at Atlanta Falcons – Game summary

Quarter	1	2	3	4	Total
Titans	0	14	14	10	38
Falcons	21	0	3	7	31

at Georgia Dome, Atlanta, Georgia

- Date: November 23
- Game time: 4:15 p.m. EST/3:15 p.m. CST
- Game weather: None (indoor stadium)
- Game attendance: 70,891
- Referee: Gerald Austin
- TV announcers (CBS): Gus Johnson and Brent Jones
- Recap, Game Book

Game information

First quarter

- ATL – Allen Rossum 59-yard punt return (Jay Feely kick), 12:53. Falcons 7–0
- ATL – T. J. Duckett 2-yard run (Jay Feely kick), 7:21. Falcons 14–0. Drive: 7 plays, 55 yards, 3:24.
- ATL – Warrick Dunn 86-yard pass from Doug Johnson (Jay Feely kick), 0:41. Falcons 21–0. Drive: 6 plays, 86 yards, 3:06.

Second quarter

- TEN – Frank Wycheck 6-yard pass from Steve McNair (Gary Anderson kick), 12:02. Falcons 21–7. Drive: 6 plays, 62 yards, 3:39.
- TEN – Frank Wycheck 5-yard pass from Steve McNair (Gary Anderson kick), 11:13. Falcons 21–14. Drive: 2 plays, 8 yards, 0:49.

Third quarter

- ATL – Jay Feely 40-yard field goal, 9:02. Falcons 24–14. Drive: 10 plays, 53 yards, 5:58.
- TEN – Eddie George 2-yard run (Gary Anderson kick), 5:03. Falcons 24–21. Drive: 8 plays, 62 yards, 3:59.
- TEN – Justin McCareins 58-yard punt return (Gary Anderson kick), 2:32. Titans 28–24.

Fourth quarter

- TEN – Gary Anderson 22-yard field goal, 9:26. Titans 31–24. Drive: 9 plays, 55 yards, 4:25.
- TEN – Justin McCareins 14-yard pass from Billy Volek (Gary Anderson kick), 7:39. Titans 38–24. Drive: 3 plays, 21 yards, 1:33.
- ATL – Peerless Price 41-yard pass from Doug Johnson (Jay Feely kick), 5:05. Titans 38–31. Drive: 7 plays, 67 yards, 2:34.

Top passers

- TEN – Billy Volek – 9/15, 117 yards, TD
- ATL – Doug Johnson – 19/32, 276 yards, 2 TD, INT

Top rushers

- TEN – Eddie George – 26 rushes, 115 yards, TD
- ATL – Warrick Dunn – 14 rushes, 14 yards

Top receivers

- TEN – Frank Wycheck – 5 receptions, 39 yards, 2 TD
- ATL – Warrick Dunn – 9 receptions, 129 yards, TD

In their first trip to the Georgia Dome since Super Bowl XXXIV the Titans surrendered 21 first-quarter points on an Allen Rossum punt return, a T. J. Duckett rushing score, and a Doug Johnson throw caught by Warrick Dunn at the Falcons 20 and run in for an 86-yard touchdown. But in the second the Falcons dropped a punt at their five-yard line and the Titans recovered; McNair then rifled a touchdown to Frank Wycheck, but had to leave the game with a strained calf. Billy Volek threw for 117 yards and one touchdown while Eddie George rushed for 115 yards and a score, ultimately securing a 38–31 Titans win, the club's largest comeback win since the 1978 Oilers season.

=== Week 13 at New York Jets ===
Week 13: Tennessee Titans at New York Jets – Game summary

Quarter	1	2	3	4	Total
Titans	7	0	3	7	17
Jets	7	3	7	7	24

at Giants Stadium, East Rutherford, New Jersey

- Date: December 1
- Game time: 9:00 p.m. EST/8:00 p.m. CST
- Game weather: Partly Cloudy, 37 °F (2.8 °C)
- Game attendance: 77,710
- Referee: Walt Anderson
- TV announcers (ABC): Al Michaels, John Madden and Lisa Guerrero
- Recap, Game Book

Game information

First quarter

- TEN – Justin McCareins 59-yard pass from Steve McNair (Gary Anderson kick), 12:02. Titans 7–0. Drive: 5 plays, 77 yards, 2:58.
- NYJ – Curtis Martin 6-yard run (Doug Brien kick), 5:34. Tied 7–7. Drive: 12 plays, 67 yards, 6:28.

Second quarter

- NYJ – Doug Brien 27-yard field goal, 0:18. Jets 10–7. Drive: 8 plays, 49 yards, 3:49.

Third quarter

- TEN – Gary Anderson 35-yard field goal, 6:10. Tied 10–10. Drive: 11 plays, 56 yards, 6:45.
- NYJ – Kevin Swayne 27-yard pass from Chad Pennington (Doug Brien kick), 3:32. Jets 17–10. Drive: 5 plays, 67 yards, 2:38.

Fourth quarter

- NYJ – Curtis Conway 8-yard pass from Chad Pennington (Doug Brien kick), 10:45. Jets 24–10. Drive: 8 plays, 80 yards, 5:02.
- TEN – Derrick Mason 8-yard pass from Steve McNair (Gary Anderson kick), 1:52. Jets 24–17. Drive: 7 plays, 52 yards, 1:35.

Top passers

- TEN – Steve McNair – 21/35, 272 yards, 2 TD, 2 INT
- NYJ – Chad Pennington – 18/23, 231 yards, 2 TD, 2 INT

Top rushers

- TEN – Eddie George – 18 rushes, 73 yards
- NYJ – Curtis Martin – 24 rushes, 67 yards, TD

Top receivers

- TEN – Derrick Mason – 11 receptions, 133 yards, TD
- NYJ – Curtis Conway – 5 receptions, 78 yards, TD

With an epic 38–34 loss to the Patriots the day before, the Indianapolis Colts gave the Titans an opening to take the division lead, but on Monday Night Football against the 4–7 Jets the Titans came out flat at The Meadowlands. Future Jet Justin McCareins caught a 59-yard touchdown from Steve McNair in the first quarter, but from there the Jets behind Chad Pennington erupted, scoring 24 points over the next three quarters. The Titans were stopped on downs when McNair tried to rifle a pass on 4th and 3 at the Jets goalline, and later clawed to 24–17 in the final 1:52 but the Jets recovered the ensuing onside kick. McNair competed despite the strained calf from the previous week and was 21 of 35 for 272 yards, two touchdowns, and two picks.

=== Week 14 vs. Indianapolis Colts ===
Week 14: Indianapolis Colts at Tennessee Titans – Game summary

Quarter	1	2	3	4	Total
Colts	3	9	17	0	29
Titans	10	0	3	14	27

at The Coliseum, Nashville, Tennessee

- Date: December 7
- Game time: 12:00 p.m. CST
- Game weather: Sunny & Cold, 42 °F (5.6 °C)
- Game attendance: 68,809
- Referee: Terry McAulay
- TV announcers (CBS): Dick Enberg, Dan Dierdorf and Bonnie Bernstein
- Recap, Game Book

Game information

First quarter

- TEN – Gary Anderson 40-yard field goal, 10:25. Titans 3–0. Drive: 9 plays, 44 yards, 4:35.
- IND – Mike Vanderjagt 21-yard field goal, 6:46. Tied 3–3. Drive: 9 plays, 52 yards, 3:39.
- TEN – Steve McNair 2-yard run (Gary Anderson kick), 1:47. Titans 10–3. Drive: 9 plays, 80 yards, 4:59.

Second quarter

- IND – Mike Vanderjagt 35-yard field goal, 8:56. Titans 10–6. Drive: 9 plays, 26 yards, 3:25.
- IND – Mike Vanderjagt 36-yard field goal, 1:48. Titans 10–9. Drive: 12 plays, 67 yards, 5:29.
- IND – Mike Vanderjagt 23-yard field goal, 0:02. Colts 12–10. Drive: 9 plays, 24 yards, 1:37.

Third quarter

- IND – Edgerrin James 2-yard run (Mike Vanderjagt kick), 9:33. Colts 19–10. Drive: 9 plays, 54 yards, 5:27.
- IND – Mike Vanderjagt 26-yard field goal, 7:16. Colts 22–10. Drive: 4 plays, 7 yards, 2:08.
- TEN – Gary Anderson 40-yard field goal, 2:40. Colts 22–13. Drive: 11 plays, 54 yards, 4:36.
- IND – Edgerrin James 5-yard run (Mike Vanderjagt kick), 0:37. Colts 29–13. Drive: 4 plays, 68 yards, 2:03.

Fourth quarter

- TEN – Robert Holcombe 1-yard pass from Steve McNair (Steve McNair run), 9:24. Colts 29–21. Drive: 12 plays, 69 yards, 6:13.
- TEN – Derrick Mason 2-yard pass from Steve McNair (pass failed), 1:52. Colts 29–27. Drive: 7 plays, 48 yards, 0:48.

Top passers

- IND – Peyton Manning – 22/34, 228 yards
- TEN – Steve McNair – 22/38, 235 yards, 2 TD

Top rushers

- IND – Edgerrin James – 28 rushes, 97 yards, 2 TD
- TEN – Eddie George – 11 rushes, 51 yards

Top receivers

- IND – Marvin Harrison – 10 receptions, 124 yards
- TEN – Derrick Mason – 6 receptions, 64 yards, TD

Following losses to AFC East teams the week before the 9–3 Colts and 9–3 Titans squared off for the division lead. Five Mike Vanderjagt field goals helped the Colts build a 29–13 fourth-quarter lead, but the Titans stormed back with McNair touchdowns to Robert Holcombe and Derrick Mason; Mason's score came with 2:52 to go in regulation, but a two-point conversion was stopped when the Colts swatted down a McNair throw. The Colts killed the clock afterward for a 29–27 Titans loss that ended any hope of the division title.

=== Week 15 vs. Buffalo Bills ===
Week 15: Buffalo Bills at Tennessee Titans – Game summary

Quarter	1	2	3	4	Total
Bills	0	10	7	9	26
Titans	3	3	8	14	28

at The Coliseum, Nashville, Tennessee

- Date: December 14
- Game time: 12:00 p.m. CST
- Game weather: Cloudy & Cold, 37 °F (2.8 °C)
- Game attendance: 68,809
- Referee: Tom White
- TV announcers (CBS): Dick Enberg, Dan Dierdorf and Bonnie Bernstein
- Recap, Game Book

Game information

First quarter

- TEN – Gary Anderson 29-yard field goal, 4:40. Titans 3–0. Drive: 14 plays, 60 yards, 6:28.

Second quarter

- TEN – Gary Anderson 39-yard field goal, 13:51. Titans 6–0. Drive: 12 plays, 35 yards, 4:39.
- BUF – Rian Lindell 27-yard field goal, 10:15. Titans 6–3. Drive: 6 plays, 65 yards, 3:36.
- BUF – Bobby Shaw 6-yard pass from Drew Bledsoe (Rian Lindell kick), 1:52. Bills 10–6. Drive: 4 plays, 26 yards, 1:15.

Third quarter

- BUF – Pat Williams 28-yard fumble return (Rian Lindell kick), 13:19. Bills 17–6
- TEN – Erron Kinney 14-yard pass from Billy Volek (Robert Holcombe run), 5:35. Bills 17–14. Drive: 3 plays, 18 yards, 0:41.

Fourth quarter

- TEN – Justin McCareins 2-yard pass from Billy Volek (Gary Anderson kick), 14:31. Titans 21–17. Drive: 8 plays, 58 yards, 4:09.
- BUF – Rian Lindell 32-yard field goal, 7:09. Titans 21–20. Drive: 8 plays, 41 yards, 3:17.
- TEN – Billy Volek 1-yard run (Gary Anderson kick), 4:23. Titans 28–20. Drive: 6 plays, 67 yards, 2:46.
- BUF – Mark Campbell 6-yard pass from Drew Bledsoe (pass failed), 0:24. Titans 28–26. Drive: 9 plays, 81 yards, 2:00.

Top passers

- BUF – Drew Bledsoe – 17/30, 168 yards, 2 TD
- TEN – Billy Volek – 26/41, 295 yards, 2 TD

Top rushers

- BUF – Travis Henry – 19 rushes, 88 yards
- TEN – Eddie George – 23 rushes, 67 yards

Top receivers

- BUF – Bobby Shaw – 4 receptions, 57 yards, TD
- TEN – Derrick Mason – 9 receptions, 137 yards

A failed two-point conversion wound up deciding the outcome of a Titans game for the second straight week. Lingering injuries to McNair put Billy Volek into the starting role for this game. The Buffalo Bills erupted to a 17–6 third quarter lead, but Volek threw two touchdowns and ran in a third as the Titans took a 28–20 lead late in the fourth. Drew Bledsoe led the Bills down the field and threw a six-yard touchdown strike to Mark Campbell with 24 seconds to go in regulation, but the two-point try was dropped in the endzone, and the ensuing onside kick was recovered by the Titans, ending a 28–26 Tennessee win.

- December 21 at Houston Texans:

McNair's final start of the regular season turned into a hard-fought back-and-forth affair as the Texans strove for their first win over the team that left Houston after 1996. In the third quarter Marlon McCree ran back a McNair pick 95 yards for a touchdown (10–10 score), then the Texans fumbled the ball and Samari Rolle ran in a 61-yard Titans score (17–10 Titans). A Domanick Williams touchdown run with 2:48 to go in the fourth put Houston up 24–20, but McNair led the Titans down the field and threw the game-winning 23-yard score to Drew Bennett with 17 seconds remaining and a 27–24 Titans final.

- December 28 vs. Tampa Bay Buccaneers:

|Weather= 63 °F (17 °C) (Mostly Cloudy) Tampa's nightmarish season as defending Super Bowl champions finally ended in a 33–13 humiliation. Titans backup Neil O'Donnell was the starter and threw for 232 yards and two touchdowns. Brad Johnson of the Bucs threw three interceptions and backup Shaun King added a fourth and in the fourth also fumbled the ball in his endzone for a Titans score. Eddie George broke 10,000 career rushing yards in this game.

=== Playoffs game summaries ===
- AFC Wildcard Playoffs at Baltimore Ravens:

Turnovers were an order of the night as Steve McNair was picked off three times – Will Demps of the Ravens caught an Ed Reed deflection and ran back a first-quarter INT for a 56-yard tying touchdown – and Ravens quarterback Anthony Wright threw two picks. Eddie George suffered a dislocated shoulder on a tackle of Reed, but returned to the game. The Titans limited Jamal Lewis to 35 rushing yards (the entire Ravens squad managed just 54) and built a 17–10 fourth quarter lead before Wright tied the game with a 35-yard score to Todd Heap with 4:30 left in regulation. McNair led the Titans down the field and ran down enough clock that the game-winning Gary Anderson field goal (46 yards) came with 29 seconds left. The Titans advanced to the Divisional round with the 20–17 win, their first over their former AFC Central rival in six tries. Until the 2017 season, this was the last time the Titans won in the playoffs and this would go down as Steve McNair's last playoff win in the NFL. It proved the last playoff win for head coach Jeff Fisher as well, either with the Titans or his later stint coaching the Rams.

- AFC Divisional Playoffs at New England Patriots:

On a brutally cold night with temperatures barely above zero and wind chills well below zero, the Titans and Patriots faced off in a grinder. A 41-yard Tom Brady touchdown to Bethel Johnson was answered with a Titans drive ending in a 5-yard Chris Brown rushing score. Both Gary Anderson and Adam Vinatieri missed field goal tries in the bitter cold, but Vinatieri broke a 14-all tie with 4:06 to go with a 46-yard field goal. Having used all their timeouts, and after a controversial intentional grounding call, the Titans were forced to go for a long throw on 4th and 12 at the Patriots 42 in the game's final two minutes; as a Patriots blitz stormed through McNair unloaded a desperation heave; Drew Bennett, who had just made two incredible sideline catches, was surrounded by Patriots as he jumped for the ball, but it bounced off his fingers for a game-deciding incompletion, a 17–14 Patriots win and a bitter ending to the Titans season. It was the last playoff game for Steve McNair as the team's starting quarterback (he made the playoffs as the Ravens starting quarterback in 2006) and the final game Eddie George would play in a Titans uniform. The Titans would not face the Patriots in the playoffs again until splitting a two-game series in the 2017-19 period.

== Playoffs ==
See also 2003–04 NFL playoffs

Week	Date	Opponent	Result	Attendance
Wild Card	January 3, 2004	at Baltimore Ravens	W 20–17	69,452
Divisional	January 10, 2004	at New England Patriots	L 14–17	68,436

=== Wild Card vs Ravens ===
==== AFC: Tennessee Titans 20, Baltimore Ravens 17 ====
Game summary

Quarter	1	2	3	4	Total
Titans	7	0	7	6	20
Ravens	7	3	0	7	17

at M&T Bank Stadium, Baltimore, Maryland

- Game time: 4:30 p.m. EST
- Game weather: 43 °F (6 °C), fair
- Game attendance: 69,452
- Referee: Jeff Triplette
- TV announcers (ABC): Mike Patrick (play-by-play), Joe Theismann, Paul Maguire (color commentators), and Suzy Kolber (sideline reporter)

Game information
- Scoring
  - TEN – Brown 6 run (Anderson kick) 8:54 TEN 7–0
  - BAL – Demps 56 interception return (Stover kick) 6:12 Tie 7–7
  - BAL – Stover 43 yard field goal 1:55 BAL 10–7
  - TEN – McCareins 49 pass from McNair (Anderson kick) 7:59 TEN 14–10
  - TEN – field goal Anderson 45 9:13 TEN 17–10
  - BAL – Heap 35 pass from Wright (Stover kick) 4:30 Tie 17–17
  - TEN – Anderson 46 yard field goal 0:29 TEN 20–17

In a defensive struggle, Gary Anderson kicked the winning 46-yard field goal for the Titans with 29 seconds left. The winning kick was set up after a 15-yard unnecessary roughness penalty on Ravens offensive lineman Orlando Brown Sr. forced Baltimore to punt and enabled Tennessee to start its final drive from its own 37-yard line. Titans quarterback Steve McNair threw three interceptions. Meanwhile, the Ravens running back Jamal Lewis, the league's regular season rushing leader, was limited to 35 yards on 14 carries.

On the Titans opening drive of the game, McNair completed passes to Drew Bennett and Frank Wycheck for gains of 17 and 14 yards, while Eddie George rushed five times for 25 yards on a 10-play, 67-yard drive. Running back Chris Brown finished the drive with a 6-yard touchdown run to give Tennessee a 7–0 lead. The Ravens were forced to punt on their ensuing drive, but three plays later, safety Ed Reed tipped a pass from McNair into the arms of cornerback Will Demps, who returned it 56 yards for a touchdown.

Early in the second quarter, a 15-yard punt return from Titans receiver Derrick Mason gave his team the ball at the Ravens 35-yard line. McNair then led them to the 17-yard line, but Reed intercepted a pass from him and returned it 23 yards to the 29. After an exchange of punts, Ravens quarterback Anthony Wright completed four passes for 56 yards and rushed for 11, setting up a 43-yard field goal by Matt Stover giving Baltimore a 10–7 halftime lead.

Midway through the third quarter, McNair's 49-yard touchdown pass to Justin McCareins gave the Titans a 14–10 lead. Then in the fourth quarter, Tennessee defense back Samari Rolle intercepted a pass from Wright at the Ravens 30-yard line, setting up a 45-yard field goal from Anderson. But Wright led Baltimore back, completing five passes for 80 yards on their ensuing drive. Tight end Todd Heap caught three of Wright's passes for 55 yards, and finished the drive with a leaping 35-yard catch in the back of the end zone to tie the game.

After an exchange of punts, the Titans took the ball on their own 37-yard line and drove 35 yards to Ravens 28-yard line where Anderson's 46-yard field goal with 33 seconds left gave them the win. This would be the Titans last playoff win until 2017.
