= Rocky Boiman =

American football player (born 1980)

No. 50
- Position: Linebacker

Personal information
- Born: January 24, 1980 (age 46); Cincinnati, Ohio, U.S.
- Listed height: 6 ft 4 in (1.93 m)
- Listed weight: 236 lb (107 kg)

Career information
- High school: St. Xavier (Cincinnati)
- College: Notre Dame (1998–2001)
- NFL draft: 2002: 4th round, 133rd overall pick

Career history
- Tennessee Titans (2002–2005); Dallas Cowboys (2006)*; Indianapolis Colts (2006–2007); Philadelphia Eagles (2008)*; Kansas City Chiefs (2008); Tennessee Titans (2009)*; Pittsburgh Steelers (2009); Detroit Lions (2010)*
- * Offseason or practice squad member only

Awards and highlights
- Super Bowl champion (XLI)

Career NFL statistics
- Total tackles: 267
- Sacks: 1.5
- Forced fumbles: 4
- Fumble recoveries: 1
- Interceptions: 5
- Defensive touchdowns: 1
- Stats at Pro Football Reference

Rocky Michael Boiman (born January 24, 1980) is an American former professional football player who was a linebacker in the National Football League (NFL) for the Tennessee Titans, Indianapolis Colts, Kansas City Chiefs, and Pittsburgh Steelers. He played college football for the Notre Dame Fighting Irish. He was selected by the Tennessee Titans in the fourth round of the 2002 NFL draft. He currently works as a football color commentator for ESPN College Football.

== Early life ==
Boiman attended St. Xavier High School in his hometown of Cincinnati, Ohio. He was named All-league as a sophomore and junior defensive back.

As a senior free safety in 1997, he tallied 164 tackles and 6 interceptions. He received All-League, All-State, Southwest Ohio Player of the Year, Greater Cincinnati League Player of the Year and All-City Player of the Year honors.

Boiman finished his high school career with 330 tackles, 11 interceptions and 15 passes defensed. He set school records for longest kickoff (95 yards) and most kickoff return yards.

He also participated in track and baseball, where he was named All-city twice.

== College career ==
Boiman accepted a football scholarship from the University of Notre Dame to play defensive back under head coach Bob Davie. As a sophomore, he was converted into an outside linebacker and had 39 tackles playing a backup role.

As a junior, he was named a starter at outside linebacker after Joe Ferrer left the school. He collected 58 tackles (8 for loss), 3.5 sacks and was also used as a pass rushing defensive end in some situations. He was a fan favorite for his intensity and tackling ability.

As a senior, he was a team co-captain and started 7 games, posting 42 tackles (11 for loss), 4 sacks and 2 fumble recoveries. He had 12 tackles against Oregon State University and 11 against Texas A&M University. He finished his college career with 21 starts out of 43 games, 144 tackles, 8.5 sacks, one pass defensed, 5 fumble recoveries and 2 forced fumbles.

== Professional career ==
=== Tennessee Titans (first stint) ===
Boiman was selected by the Tennessee Titans in the fourth round (133rd overall) of the 2002 NFL draft. As a rookie, he played mainly on special teams, setting a franchise record with 28 tackles.

In 2003, he had his most productive season, when he played in all 16 games (starting 2), making 55 tackles (4 for loss), 18 assists, 2 interceptions (one returned for a touchdown), 16 special teams tackles, 1.5 sacks and one safety. He replaced an injured Peter Sirmon in the first quarter at outside linebacker against the Pittsburgh Steelers, collecting 8 tackles, a safety and a 60-yard interception return for a touchdown, while earning AFC Defensive Player of the Week honors.

In 2004, he entered the season as the starter at left outside linebacker after Sirmon suffered a season ending knee injury. He played in 7 games with 6 starts, but was limited with a left knee and a right quad injury, before being declared out of the season with a hamstring injury on December 5. He made 24 tackles (one for loss) and one pass defensed.

In 2005, he appeared in 16 games with 2 starts at left outside linebacker. He registered 28 defensive tackles and 15 special teams tackles (tied for third on the team).

=== Dallas Cowboys ===
On March 20, 2006, he was signed as a free agent by the Dallas Cowboys, to improve the depth at linebacker and on special teams. During training camp he suffered a compound fracture of his right thumb, but only missed 10 days. On September 2, he was a surprise cut after receiving a $1,000,000 signing bonus.

=== Indianapolis Colts ===
On September 4, 2006, he signed with the Indianapolis Colts to play on special teams. He played in every game, totaling 21 tackles (16 solo) and one interception. In the postseason, he earned a Super Bowl ring as the Colts defeated the Chicago Bears 29–17 in Super Bowl XLI held on February 4, 2007.

On April 17, 2007, Boiman signed a one-year contract with the Colts. He appeared in 16 games (7 starts), totaling 55 tackles (34 solo), 2 interceptions and one fumble recovery.

=== Philadelphia Eagles ===
On March 24, 2008, he was signed by the Philadelphia Eagles as a free agent. On August 31, he was cut after being passed on the depth chart by Tank Daniels.

=== Kansas City Chiefs ===
On October 15, 2008, Boiman was signed by the Kansas City Chiefs. He played in 11 games (9 starts), making 68 tackles (51 solo).

=== Tennessee Titans (second stint) ===
On August 11, 2009, he was signed by the Tennessee Titans as a free agent. He was cut on September 5.

=== Pittsburgh Steelers ===
On November 24, 2009, Boiman was signed by the Pittsburgh Steelers to help improve the kickoff coverage unit. He played in six games and totaled four assists and no tackles.

=== Detroit Lions ===
On August 30, 2010, he was signed as a free agent by the Detroit Lions, reuniting with Jim Schwartz who was his defensive coordinator with the Titans. On September 5, he was released to make room for linebacker Spencer Havner.

=== NFL statistics ===
| Year | Team | Games | Combined tackles | Tackles | Assisted tackles | Sacks | Force Fumbles | Fumble recoveries | Fumble return yards | Interceptions | Interception return yards | Yards per interception return | Longest interception return | Interceptions returned for touchdown | Passes defended |
|---|---|---|---|---|---|---|---|---|---|---|---|---|---|---|---|
| 2002 | TEN | 16 | 13 | 11 | 2 | 0.0 | 1 | 0 | 0 | 0 | 0 | 0 | 0 | 0 | 0 |
| 2003 | TEN | 16 | 45 | 28 | 17 | 1.5 | 0 | 0 | 0 | 2 | 70 | 35 | 60 | 1 | 2 |
| 2004 | TEN | 7 | 19 | 8 | 11 | 0.0 | 0 | 0 | 0 | 0 | 0 | 0 | 0 | 0 | 1 |
| 2005 | TEN | 15 | 28 | 17 | 11 | 0.0 | 0 | 0 | 0 | 0 | 0 | 0 | 0 | 0 | 0 |
| 2006 | IND | 16 | 21 | 16 | 5 | 0.0 | 1 | 0 | 0 | 1 | 0 | 0 | 0 | 0 | 2 |
| 2007 | IND | 16 | 55 | 34 | 21 | 0.0 | 0 | 1 | 0 | 2 | 28 | 14 | 26 | 0 | 4 |
| 2008 | KC | 11 | 73 | 56 | 17 | 0.0 | 1 | 0 | 0 | 0 | 0 | 0 | 0 | 0 | 3 |
| 2009 | PIT | 6 | 3 | 0 | 3 | 0.0 | 0 | 0 | 0 | 0 | 0 | 0 | 0 | 0 | 0 |
| Career | | 103 | 257 | 170 | 87 | 1.5 | 3 | 1 | 0 | 5 | 98 | 20 | 60 | 1 | 12 |

== Personal life ==
Boiman works for Westwood One as a color analyst for college football games, as a sideline reporter for NFL games, and co-hosting the 3:00 P.M. to 6:00 P.M. show with Eddie Fingers on WLW-AM in Cincinnati, Ohio. He also works as a color analyst for ESPN and BBC television and radio.

In the summer of 2011 it was announced that he would be an analyst for the Sky Sports network in the United Kingdom. He was joined by Nick Ferguson and two other English analysts.

In the fall of 2011, he was appointed a trustee of Green Township, located on the west side of Cincinnati in Hamilton County, replacing a member who had stepped down to take another position in Hamilton County.
