= Drew Bennett =

American football player (born 1978)

No. 19, 83
- Position: Wide receiver

Personal information
- Born: August 26, 1978 (age 48); Berkeley, California, U.S.
- Listed height: 6 ft 5 in (1.96 m)
- Listed weight: 196 lb (89 kg)

Career information
- High school: Miramonte (Orinda, California)
- College: UCLA (1996–2000)
- NFL draft: 2001: undrafted

Career history
- Tennessee Titans (2001–2006); St. Louis Rams (2007–2008); Baltimore Ravens (2009)*
- * Offseason or practice squad member only

Career NFL statistics
- Receptions: 307
- Receiving yards: 4,412
- Receiving touchdowns: 28
- Stats at Pro Football Reference

Andrew Russell Bennett (born August 26, 1978) is an American former professional football player who was a wide receiver in the National Football League (NFL). He played college football for the UCLA Bruins and was signed by the Tennessee Titans as an undrafted free agent in 2001.

Bennett was also a member of the St. Louis Rams and Baltimore Ravens. He retired prior to the 2009 season due to a knee injury.

== Early life ==
Bennett attended Miramonte High School in Orinda, California, and was a three-sport standout in football, baseball, and basketball. As a senior football quarterback, he won first-team All-League and second-team All-Bay Area honors, after he passed for 2,308 yards and 18 touchdowns and rushed for six touchdowns. In baseball, he batted .430 and won first-team All-League honors.

== College career ==
Bennett was offered a scholarship to play at Princeton University in New Jersey, but turned it down to attend the University of California, Los Angeles (UCLA). He was a walk-on as a quarterback and elected to redshirt the 1996 season. He was awarded a scholarship for the 1997 season and switched positions to become a wide receiver for his junior year. He played both wide receiver and quarterback in his senior season and won the Paul I. Wellman Award for All-Around Excellence. He graduated from UCLA with a major in Political Science, and is also a member of the Sigma Chi fraternity.

== Professional career ==
=== Tennessee Titans ===
From 2001 to 2006, Bennett played wide receiver for the Tennessee Titans, becoming a full-time starter. During the 2004 season he tied an NFL record by scoring eight touchdowns in a three-game span.

=== St. Louis Rams ===
In 2007, Bennett became a free agent and signed with the St. Louis Rams. He signed a six-year deal worth $30 million, with $10 million guaranteed. He played his two guaranteed seasons with the Rams before being released on February 25, 2009.

=== Baltimore Ravens ===
Bennett signed with the Baltimore Ravens on July 24, 2009, to a one-year, $745,000 contract. He retired on July 26, 2009, due to a flare-up of a previous knee condition.

== NFL career statistics ==
Legend
**Bold**	Career high

=== Regular season ===
Year	Team	Games		Receiving					
Year	Team	GP	GS	Tgt	Rec	Yds	Avg	Lng	TD
2001	TEN	14	1	46	24	329	13.7	50	1
2002	TEN	**16**	7	64	33	478	14.5	53	2
2003	TEN	12	8	54	32	504	15.8	48	4
2004	TEN	**16**	**16**	**144**	**80**	**1,247**	15.6	48	**11**
2005	TEN	13	10	109	58	738	12.7	**55**	4
2006	TEN	**16**	15	98	46	737	**16.0**	39	3
2007	STL	14	1	73	33	375	11.4	24	3
2008	STL	1	0	1	1	4	4.0	4	0
		102	58	589	307	4,412	14.4	55	28

=== Playoffs ===
Year	Team	Games		Receiving					
Year	Team	GP	GS	Tgt	Rec	Yds	Avg	Lng	TD
2002	TEN	**2**	**2**	**14**	**10**	**143**	14.3	**33**	**1**
2003	TEN	**2**	1	7	4	65	**16.3**	24	0
		4	3	21	14	208	14.9	33	1

== Post-NFL career and personal life ==
Bennett has appeared on ESPN's First Take (hosted by Jay Crawford) as recently as March 24, 2010, as an NFL analyst alongside Bobby Carpenter.

Bennett now resides in San Ramon, California.
