= Erron Kinney =

American football player (born 1977)

No. 88
- Position: Tight end

Personal information
- Born: July 28, 1977 (age 49); Ashland, Virginia, U.S.
- Listed height: 6 ft 5 in (1.96 m)
- Listed weight: 275 lb (125 kg)

Career information
- High school: Patrick Henry (Ashland)
- College: Florida
- NFL draft: 2000: 3rd round, 68th overall pick

Career history
- Tennessee Titans (2000–2006)

Awards and highlights
- Bowl Alliance national champion (1996)

Career NFL statistics
- Receptions: 178
- Receiving yards: 1,750
- Receiving touchdowns: 10
- Stats at Pro Football Reference

Erron Quincy Kinney (born July 28, 1977) is an American former professional football player who was a tight end for six seasons with the Tennessee Titans of the National Football League (NFL) during the early 2000s. Kinney played college football for the Florida Gators, and thereafter, he played in the NFL for the Titans.

== Early life ==
Kinney was born in Ashland, Virginia, in 1977. He attended Patrick Henry High School in Ashland, where he played for the Patrick Henry Patriots high school football team. Among his Patriots teammates was Damien Woody, future lineman for the New York Jets. Kinney and Woody were members of the 1994 Patriots football team that won the Virginia high school football state championship.

== College career ==
Kinney accepted an athletic scholarship to attend the University of Florida in Gainesville, Florida, where he played for coach Steve Spurrier's Gators teams from 1996 to 1999. The coaching staff redshirted him as a true freshman in 1995, but he was a varsity letterman for the 12–1 1996 Gators team that defeated the Florida State Seminoles in the Sugar Bowl to win the Bowl Alliance national championship. Kinney finished his college career with thirty-nine receptions for 507 yards and five touchdowns.

While attending the University of Florida, Kinney majored in elementary education.

== Professional career ==
The Tennessee Titans selected Kinney in the third round (68th pick overall) of the 2000 NFL draft, and he played for the Titans from 2000 to 2006. In 2005, he had a career year hauling in fifty-five receptions for 543 yards. Kinney suffered a knee injury in training camp prior to the 2006 season, and was released by the Titans in March 2007. He finished his seven-year NFL career with 178 receptions for 1,750 yards (an average of 9.8 yards per reception) and ten touchdowns.

== NFL career statistics ==
Legend
| **Bold** | Career high |

=== Regular season ===
| Year | Team | Games | | Receiving | | | | | |
| Year | Team | GP | GS | Tgt | Rec | Yds | Avg | Lng | TD |
|---|---|---|---|---|---|---|---|---|---|
| 2000 | TEN | **16** | 9 | 35 | 19 | 197 | 10.4 | 19 | 1 |
| 2001 | TEN | 13 | 12 | 42 | 25 | 263 | 10.5 | 24 | 1 |
| 2002 | TEN | 15 | 7 | 19 | 13 | 173 | **13.3** | **31** | 0 |
| 2003 | TEN | **16** | **16** | 58 | 41 | 381 | 9.3 | 28 | **3** |
| 2004 | TEN | 9 | 9 | 30 | 25 | 193 | 7.7 | 21 | **3** |
| 2005 | TEN | 14 | 14 | **72** | **55** | **543** | 9.9 | 27 | 2 |
| | | 83 | 67 | 256 | 178 | 1,750 | 9.8 | 31 | 10 |

=== Playoffs ===
| Year | Team | Games | | Receiving | | | | | |
| Year | Team | GP | GS | Tgt | Rec | Yds | Avg | Lng | TD |
|---|---|---|---|---|---|---|---|---|---|
| 2000 | TEN | 1 | 0 | 2 | 1 | 9 | **9.0** | 9 | 0 |
| 2002 | TEN | **2** | **2** | **6** | **4** | **35** | 8.8 | **18** | **1** |
| 2003 | TEN | **2** | **2** | 5 | 3 | 17 | 5.7 | 6 | 0 |
| | | 5 | 4 | 13 | 8 | 61 | 7.6 | 18 | 1 |

== Life after football ==
Interested in fire safety since childhood, on July 28, 2008, Kinney was sworn in as a firefighter in the fire department of the Nashville, Tennessee suburb of Brentwood. In 2004, Tennessee governor Phil Bredesen appointed him to a seven-year term with the Tennessee State Firefighting Commission, an organization that tests and certifies firefighters in the state. Kinney was a captain with the St. Andrews Fire Department in Charleston, South Carolina. He was hired as the first fire chief for the City of Mt. Juliet, Tennessee Fire Department on March 12, 2013. In 2015 he resigned from Mt Juliet. On July 1, 2017, he was appointed chief of the Sherborn, Massachusetts fire department. On September 10, 2019, Kinney was selected to be the Fire Chief for the town of Norfolk, MA.

He conducts a youth football camp at Lipscomb University in Nashville, Tennessee every summer.

== See also ==
- Florida Gators
- Florida Gators football, 1990–99
- History of the Tennessee Titans
- List of Florida Gators in the NFL draft
