= Lamont Thompson =

American football player (born 1978)

No. 24, 37, 28, 27, 34
- Position: Safety

Personal information
- Born: July 30, 1978 (age 48); Richmond, California, U.S.
- Listed height: 6 ft 1 in (1.85 m)
- Listed weight: 220 lb (100 kg)

Career information
- High school: El Cerrito (El Cerrito, California)
- College: Washington State
- NFL draft: 2002: 2nd round, 41st overall pick

Career history
- Cincinnati Bengals (2002); Tennessee Titans (2003–2006); Miami Dolphins (2007); Jacksonville Jaguars (2007)

Awards and highlights
- First-team All-American (2001); First-team All-Pac-10 (2001); Second-team All-Pac-10 (1998)

Career NFL statistics
- Total tackles: 261
- Sacks: 1
- Forced fumbles: 2
- Fumble recoveries: 2
- Interceptions: 9
- Defensive touchdowns: 1
- Stats at Pro Football Reference

Lamont Darnell Thompson (born July 30, 1978) is an American former professional football player who was a safety in the National Football League (NFL). He played college football for the Washington State Cougars and was selected by the Cincinnati Bengals in the second round of the 2002 NFL draft. He also played for the Tennessee Titans, Miami Dolphins and Jacksonville Jaguars.

== College career ==
He played high school football at El Cerrito High School. Thompson then moved on to the Washington State Cougars, where he played free safety. As a true freshman, Thompson led the team with 6 interceptions in 1997, despite not being a full-time starter. This included a crucial 45–35 win over the University of Washington, in which Thompson, filling in for injured starter Duane Stewart, intercepted Washington quarterback Brock Huard three times. Washington State finished the season with 10 wins and made it to the Rose Bowl for the first time since 1931, losing to the #1 ranked Michigan Wolverines 21–16.

After the 1997 season, Washington State lost four players to the NFL draft, including starting quarterback Ryan Leaf. The team then went through a period of decline, winning just three games in 1998 and 1999. During this period, Thompson was converted to cornerback, used to return punts, and even occasionally as a receiver on offense, but still excelled on defense, intercepting four passes in both seasons. In 2000, Thompson missed the entire season with a neck injury. The team went on to lose three games in overtime and finish with another dismal record at 4–7.

Thompson received a medical redshirt and returned as a 5th-year senior in 2001. Now back playing safety again, he intercepted a career-high 8 passes and assisted his team to a 9–2 record and a win over Purdue University in the Sun Bowl. Thompsons's teammates in 2001 included future NFL defensive backs Marcus Trufant, Jason David, and Erik Coleman. He finished his career at Washington State with 22 interceptions, the fourth highest total in NCAA division 1 history, which he returned for 222 yards and a touchdown. He also returned 16 punts for 123 yards, 1 kickoff for 14 yards, and caught 2 passes for 34. He was selected to Washington State's athletic Hall of fame in 2015.

== Professional career ==
=== Cincinnati Bengals ===
He was selected by the Cincinnati Bengals in the second round of the 2002 NFL draft. Thompson was placed on Injured Reserve in December 2002 with a right knee injury. Thompson was released by the Bengals prior to the 2003 season.

=== Tennessee Titans ===
Thompson was almost immediately signed by the Titans after being released by the Bengals. Over the next three seasons, Thompson started 45 of 48 games and intercepted 8 passes. His best season was in 2004, when he intercepted 4 passes, which he returned for 77 yards and a touchdown. In 2006, he intercepted three passes and recovered two fumbles. On September 1, 2007, the Titans released him.

=== Miami Dolphins ===
On September 11, 2007, he signed with the Dolphins. On October 10, 2007, the Dolphins released him.

=== Jacksonville Jaguars ===
On November 21, 2007, Lamont signed with the Jacksonville Jaguars. He was released on April 16, 2008. He finished his NFL career with 9 interceptions, 94 return yards, and a touchdown, along with 2 fumble recoveries, 19 return yards, 1 sack and 2 forced fumbles.

== NFL career statistics ==
Legend
**Bold**	Career high

=== Regular season ===
Year	Team	Games		Tackles					Interceptions					Fumbles			
Year	Team	GP	GS	Cmb	Solo	Ast	Sck	TFL	Int	Yds	TD	Lng	PD	FF	FR	Yds	TD
2002	CIN	13	0	13	12	1	0.0	0	1	4	0	4	1	0	0	0	0
2003	TEN	**16**	0	19	14	5	0.0	0	0	0	0	0	2	0	0	0	0
2004	TEN	**16**	13	65	55	10	0.0	0	**4**	**77**	**1**	**37**	6	**1**	0	0	0
2005	TEN	**16**	**16**	**81**	**62**	**19**	**1.0**	**2**	1	0	0	0	3	**1**	0	0	0
2006	TEN	**16**	**16**	73	55	18	0.0	1	3	14	0	11	**8**	0	**2**	**19**	0
2007	MIA	3	0	1	1	0	0.0	0	0	0	0	0	0	0	0	0	0
2007	JAX	3	0	9	8	1	0.0	0	0	0	0	0	0	0	0	0	0
		83	45	261	207	54	1.0	3	9	95	1	37	20	2	2	19	0

=== Playoffs ===
Year	Team	Games		Tackles					Interceptions					Fumbles			
Year	Team	GP	GS	Cmb	Solo	Ast	Sck	TFL	Int	Yds	TD	Lng	PD	FF	FR	Yds	TD
2003	TEN	**2**	**1**	**2**	**2**	0	0.0	0	0	0	0	0	**2**	0	0	0	0
		2	1	2	2	0	0.0	0	0	0	0	0	2	0	0	0	0

Sporting positions
Preceded by Chuck Cecil; 21 Interceptions	Pac-10 Career Interceptions record 2001–present 24 Interceptions	Succeeded by current record holder
