= Justin McCareins =

American football player (born 1978)

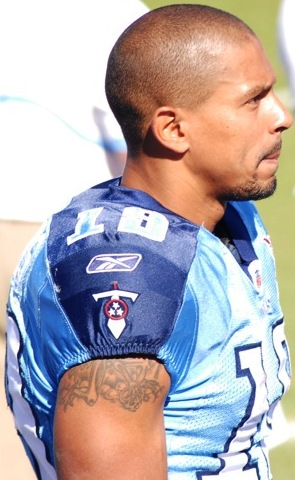
- McCareins with the Tennessee Titans in 2008

No. 86, 81, 19
- Position: Wide receiver

Personal information
- Born: December 1, 1978 (age 47); Itasca, Illinois, U.S.
- Listed height: 6 ft 2 in (1.88 m)
- Listed weight: 215 lb (98 kg)

Career information
- High school: Naperville North (Naperville, Illinois)
- College: Northern Illinois (1997–2000)
- NFL draft: 2001: 4th round, 124th overall pick

Career history
- Tennessee Titans (2001–2003); New York Jets (2004–2007); Tennessee Titans (2008)

Awards and highlights
- MAC Special Teams Player of the Year (2000); First-team All-MAC (2000)

Career NFL statistics
- Receptions: 240
- Receiving yards: 3,676
- Receiving touchdowns: 16
- Stats at Pro Football Reference

Justin Morgan McCareins (born December 1, 1978) is an American former professional football player who was a wide receiver in the National Football League (NFL). He played college football for the Northern Illinois Huskies and was selected by the Tennessee Titans in the fourth round of the 2001 NFL draft. He also played for the New York Jets.

== Early life ==
McCareins attended Peacock Middle School located in Itasca, Illinois. He attended Benet Academy in Lisle, Illinois, for one semester before transferring to Naperville North High School where he was a teammate of future NFL running back Chris Brown. McCareins played college football at Northern Illinois University. He is the school's all-time leader in receiving yards, and has the longest reception in school history on a 99-yard touchdown catch vs Ball State. He was inducted into the school's athletic Hall of Fame during the Huskies game against Kent State on October 8, 2011.

== Professional career ==
=== Tennessee Titans ===
McCareins was selected in the fourth round of the 2001 NFL draft by the Titans. In 2003, McCareins had a career year with the Tennessee Titans compiling 813 yards receiving along with 7 touchdowns and 47 receptions, adding one rush for 13 yards. He played an important role for the Titans, especially in their 2002-2003 playoff campaign, setting up the game-winning field goal in overtime against the Pittsburgh Steelers by catching 31-yard and 22-yard passes from quarterback Steve McNair to set up Joe Nedney's game-winning field goal. He is also one of only five players since the franchise moved to Tennessee to return a punt for a touchdown.

After the 2003 season, he was traded to the New York Jets.

=== New York Jets ===
McCareins signed a 7-year, $30 million contract with the New York Jets after the 2003 season. McCareins had a successful first year with the Jets in 2004, catching 56 passes for 770 yards and 4 touchdowns, which placed him second on the team in receiving. McCareins also had 13 catches for 169 yards in the 2004 playoffs for the Jets. Despite catching only 43 passes in 2005, he still racked up 713 yards for the Jets, his third straight 700+ yard season.

The Jets released him after the 2007 season, the 4th year on his 7-year contract. McCareins finished 26th on the Jets all-time receiving list.

=== Tennessee Titans (second stint) ===
On March 12, 2008, McCareins re-joined the Titans on a one-year, $1 million contract after four seasons with the Jets. On September 21, 2008, McCareins caught a 17-yard pass from quarterback Kerry Collins, making Collins only the 15th player in NFL history to pass for over 30,000 yards. McCareins has the 35th most receiving yards in Titans franchise history with 1614 yards and has the 8th highest yards per catch average (minimum 50 catches) in Titans franchise history, averaging 16.4 yards per catch. He would fumble just four times in his four years in Tennessee, and his 10.9 yards per punt return places his 5th in franchise history (minimum 35 returns).

== NFL career statistics ==
Legend
**Bold**	Career high

=== Regular season ===
Year	Team	Games		Receiving					
Year	Team	GP	GS	Tgt	Rec	Yds	Avg	Lng	TD
2001	TEN	4	1	3	3	88	**29.3**	36	0
2002	TEN	**16**	1	48	19	301	15.8	55	2
2003	TEN	**16**	10	82	47	**813**	17.3	**73**	**7**
2004	NYJ	**16**	**16**	90	**56**	770	13.8	43	4
2005	NYJ	**16**	**16**	**102**	43	713	16.6	45	2
2006	NYJ	**16**	7	40	23	347	15.1	50	1
2007	NYJ	**16**	6	46	19	232	12.2	51	0
2008	TEN	14	10	72	30	412	13.7	37	0
		114	67	483	240	3,676	15.3	73	16

=== Playoffs ===
Year	Team	Games		Receiving					
Year	Team	GP	GS	Tgt	Rec	Yds	Avg	Lng	TD
2002	TEN	**2**	0	4	2	53	**26.5**	31	0
2003	TEN	**2**	1	5	4	83	20.8	**49**	**1**
2004	NYJ	**2**	**2**	**24**	**13**	**169**	13.0	30	0
2006	NYJ	1	1	6	2	31	15.5	20	0
2008	TEN	1	1	6	2	24	12.0	17	0
		8	5	45	23	360	15.7	49	1

== Post NFL ==
McCareins now lives with his family in Whitewright, Texas, following a brief career in law-enforcement.
