= Derrick Mason =

American football player (born 1974)

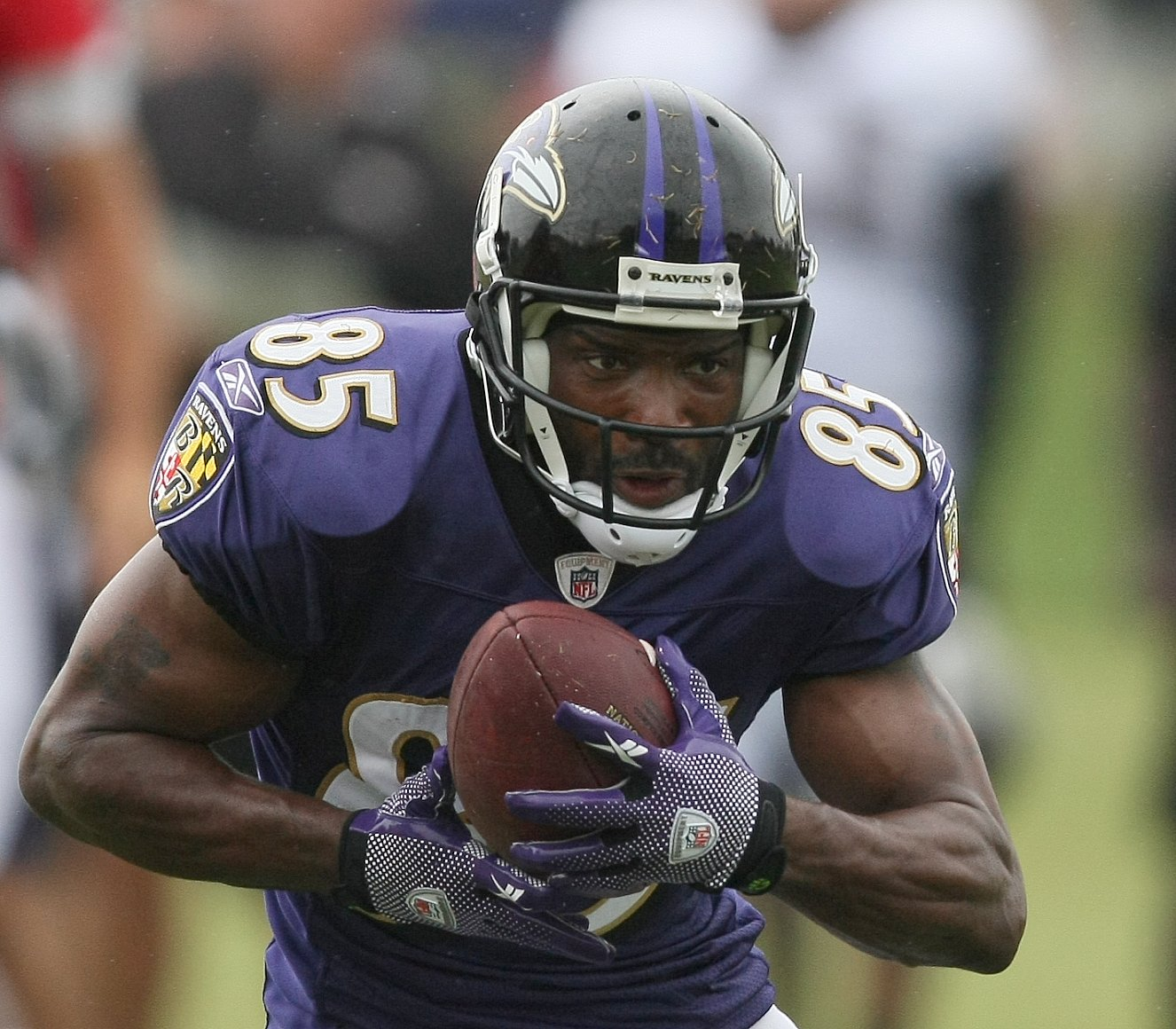
- Mason with the Baltimore Ravens in 2010

No. 82, 85
- Position: Wide receiver

Personal information
- Born: January 17, 1974 (age 52); Detroit, Michigan, U.S.
- Listed height: 5 ft 10 in (1.78 m)
- Listed weight: 197 lb (89 kg)

Career information
- High school: Mumford (Detroit)
- College: Michigan State (1993–1996)
- NFL draft: 1997: 4th round, 98th overall pick

Career history
- Tennessee Oilers / Titans (1997–2004); Baltimore Ravens (2005–2010); New York Jets (2011); Houston Texans (2011)

Awards and highlights
- First-team All-Pro (2000) (Note: Selected as a Kick Returner); 2× Pro Bowl (2000, 2003); NFL punt return yards leader (2000); Second-team All-Big Ten (1996)

Career NFL statistics
- Receptions: 943
- Receiving yards: 12,061
- Receiving touchdowns: 66
- Return yards: 5,086
- Return touchdowns: 3
- Stats at Pro Football Reference

Derrick James Mason (born January 17, 1974) is an American former professional football player who was a wide receiver for fifteen seasons in the National Football League (NFL). He played college football for the Michigan State Spartans and was selected in the fourth round of the 1997 NFL draft by the Tennessee Oilers (which was renamed the Titans in 1999). After eight seasons with Tennessee, Mason signed with the Baltimore Ravens, becoming the franchise's all-time leading receiver with 5,777 yards from 2005 to 2010. He spent 2011 with the New York Jets and Houston Texans before retiring as a Raven on June 11, 2012.

A two-time Pro Bowl selection (2000, 2003) and First Team All-Pro selection (2000), Mason is the only player in NFL history with at least 10,000 receiving yards and 5,000 return yards. He set the record for all-purpose yards in a single season, which was later broken by Darren Sproles. At the time of his retirement, Mason was the last active NFL player to have played for the Oilers before the franchise's rebranding.

== Early life ==
Mason attended Mumford High School in Detroit, Michigan. He set a school record for both catches (70) and receiving yards (1,243).

== College career ==
Mason played college football at Michigan State. During his four-year career, he set a team record for kick return yards of 2,384. He also caught eight touchdowns.

He played under Nick Saban in 1995 and 1996 where he would catch 106 passes for 1,652 yards and 6 TD. He also played alongside Muhsin Muhammad in 1995.

== Professional career ==
Pre-draft measurables
Height	Weight	Arm length	Hand span	40-yard dash	10-yard split	20-yard split	20-yard shuttle	Three-cone drill	Vertical jump
5 ft 10 3/4 in (1.80 m)	193 lb (88 kg)	32 1/4 in (0.82 m)	10 in (0.25 m)	4.55 s	1.62 s	2.65 s	4.46 s	7.33 s	32.0 in (0.81 m)
All values from NFL Combine

=== Tennessee Titans ===
Mason started his career with the Oilers/Titans after being selected in the fourth round (98th overall) in the 1997 NFL draft. In his rookie season, he played in 16 games recording 14 catches for 186 yards. He made his NFL debut versus the Oakland Raiders on August 31. The following season, he again played in all 16 games and this time recording 25 catches for 333 yards and three touchdowns, the first of his career came versus the Chicago Bears on October 25. He also returned 31 punts for 228 yards. In the 1999 season, Mason gained 1,030 yards returning punts and kickoffs, and added 8 kick returns for 322 yards and a touchdown in the team's three playoff games, assisting the Titans to Super Bowl XXXIV where he returned 5 kickoffs for 122 yards and caught 2 passes for 18 yards in Tennessee's 23–16 loss. He also returned a kickoff 80 yards for a touchdown in the Titans 33–14 win over the Jacksonville Jaguars in the AFC title game. In the 2000 season, he led the NFL in punt return yards (662) while also catching 63 passes for 895 yards and returning 41 kickoffs for 1,132 yards (an NFL leading 27 yards per return average), giving him 2,690 combined receiving and special teams yards, breaking the NFL record for all-purpose yards in a single season previously held by Lionel James (2,535). Darren Sproles broke Mason's record in 2011 with 2,696 yards. He is only the second player in Titans history to pass the 2,000 yard mark. He earned his first trip to the Pro Bowl. In 2001, he started 15 games and scored 9 touchdowns, a career-high. Just as he had done the previous season, he went past the 2,000 all purpose yards mark, the first Titan to do this in consecutive seasons. The following season, he started in 14 games and led the team in a number of categories including receptions, reception yards and touchdowns. In 2003, he started all 16 games and finished the season with 1,303 receiving yards and 95 receptions which was the 5th highest in the NFL. The following season, in 2004, he again started all 16 games and was ranked 2nd in the NFL with 96 receptions for 1,168 yards and seven touchdowns.

=== Baltimore Ravens ===
Mason signed with the Baltimore Ravens as a free agent on March 7, 2005. In his first year with the team, he started in all 16 games and recorded 86 receptions, a Ravens franchise season record. In 2006, he played in 16 games with 15 starts and finished the campaign with 68 receptions for 750 yards and two touchdowns. Mason caught the pass that gave Steve McNair 30,000 passing yards for his career in the 19–7 win in the season finale against the Buffalo Bills. The following year, Mason had 103 receptions for 1,087 yards and five touchdowns. Mason became the first player in Ravens history to record 100 receptions in a season. He also had a 79-yard score.

In 2008, Mason was selected as a third alternate wide receiver for the Pro Bowl. In 2008, he had 80 receptions for 1,037 receiving yards and 5 touchdowns. He was the primary target for rookie quarterback Joe Flacco. Mason dislocated his shoulder when he fell after a catch in a game against the Houston Texans, eventually coming back to finish the contest. Mason also played with a shoulder he separated against the New York Giants. Mason re-aggravated of his injury against the Dallas Cowboys, but finished the game with six catches for 66 yards and one touchdown. He led the team with a postseason career-high 12 receptions for 190 yards, including a postseason career long 48-yard touchdown reception.

The 2009 season saw Mason continue his solid production with 73 catches for 1,028 yards. Mason scored seven times, two more than the previous year.

On November 21, 2010, Mason caught his 900th reception, becoming the 13th receiver in NFL history to do so. In a 2010 game against the Carolina Panthers, Mason and Flacco got into an argument on the sidelines. Mason was reportedly upset that Flacco was late in getting a pass to him. The two apparently settled their differences. Mason had 61 catches for 802 yards and seven scores that season.

When the NFL announced the new collective bargaining agreement on July 25, 2011, the Ravens announced their intention to release Mason upon the start of free agency to free salary cap space. He was formally released by the team on July 28.

=== New York Jets ===
Mason signed with the New York Jets on August 6, 2011. His statistical production was limited. Also, there were some problems in the team locker room. Some said that Mason was a cancer to the team, and that he complained about offensive coordinator Brian Schottenheimer's play calling. Said Mason, "I never complained to Rex Ryan or Mike Tannenbaum, and I hope that one day it come out who actually did it, but I doubt it." Mason said in a report published by Scout.com. "I never went to Rex or Mike to complain about Brian's play calling."

=== Houston Texans ===
The Jets traded Mason to the Houston Texans on October 11, 2011, in exchange for a conditional seventh-round draft pick. Mason caught only six passes for 55 yards with the team. He was later released on December 12.

=== Retirement ===
Mason announced his retirement from professional football by signing a one-day contract with Baltimore Ravens on June 11, 2012.

== NFL career statistics ==
Legend
	NFL record
	Led the league
**Bold**	Career high

Regular season statistics
Year	Team	Games		Receiving					Punt returns					Kickoff returns					Fumbles	
Year	Team	GP	GS	Rec	Yds	Avg	Lng	TD	Ret	Yds	Avg	Lng	TD	Ret	Yds	Avg	Lng	TD	Fum	Lost
1997	TEN	16	2	14	186	13.3	38	0	13	95	7.3	29	0	26	551	21.2	54	0	**5**	**2**
1998	TEN	16	0	25	333	13.3	47	3	31	228	7.4	25	0	8	154	19.3	26	0	1	0
1999	TEN	13	0	8	89	11.1	31	0	26	225	8.7	65	**1**	41	805	19.6	41	0	0	0
2000	TEN	16	10	63	895	14.2	34	5	**51**	**662**	**13.0**	**69**	**1**	**42**	**1,132**	**27.0**	66	0	1	0
2001	TEN	15	15	73	1,128	**15.5**	71	**9**	20	128	6.4	20	0	34	748	22.0	**101**	**1**	2	1
2002	TEN	14	14	79	1,012	12.8	40	5	9	60	6.7	21	0	—	—	—	—	—	2	1
2003	TEN	16	16	95	**1,303**	13.7	50	8	8	99	12.4	21	0	5	106	21.2	34	0	0	0
2004	TEN	16	16	96	1,168	12.2	37	7	24	93	3.9	13	0	—	—	—	—	—	2	0
2005	BAL	16	16	86	1,073	12.5	39	3	—	—	—	—	—	—	—	—	—	—	1	1
2006	BAL	16	15	68	750	11.0	38	2	—	—	—	—	—	—	—	—	—	—	1	0
2007	BAL	16	16	**103**	1,087	10.6	**79**	5	—	—	—	—	—	—	—	—	—	—	1	1
2008	BAL	16	16	80	1,037	13.0	54	5	—	—	—	—	—	—	—	—	—	—	2	1
2009	BAL	16	16	73	1,028	14.1	72	7	—	—	—	—	—	—	—	—	—	—	0	0
2010	BAL	16	15	61	802	13.1	42	7	—	—	—	—	—	—	—	—	—	—	0	0
2011	NYJ	5	2	13	115	8.8	30	0	—	—	—	—	—	—	—	—	—	—	0	0
2011	HOU	7	0	6	55	9.2	16	0	—	—	—	—	—	—	—	—	—	—	0	0
Career		230	169	943	12,061	12.8	79	66	182	1,590	8.7	69	2	156	3,496	22.4	101	1	18	7

Playoff statistics
Year	Team	Games		Receiving					Punt returns					Kickoff returns					Fumbles	
Year	Team	GP	GS	Rec	Yds	Avg	Lng	TD	Ret	Yds	Avg	Lng	TD	Ret	Yds	Avg	Lng	TD	Fum	Lost
1999	TEN	4	0	2	18	9.0	9	0	**11**	**78**	7.1	**19**	0	**13**	**437**	**33.6**	**80**	**1**	**2**	0
2000	TEN	1	1	7	88	12.6	19	0	2	5	2.5	8	0	4	55	13.8	17	0	0	0
2002	TEN	2	2	10	88	8.8	18	0	2	20	10.0	11	0	—	—	—	—	—	0	0
2003	TEN	2	2	10	118	11.8	29	**1**	6	70	**11.7**	17	0	—	—	—	—	—	0	0
2006	BAL	1	1	2	16	8.0	9	0	—	—	—	—	—	—	—	—	—	—	0	0
2008	BAL	3	3	**12**	**190**	**15.8**	**48**	**1**	—	—	—	—	—	—	—	—	—	—	0	0
2009	BAL	2	2	5	72	14.4	27	0	—	—	—	—	—	—	—	—	—	—	0	0
2010	BAL	2	2	1	11	11.0	11	0	—	—	—	—	—	—	—	—	—	—	0	0
Career		17	13	49	601	12.3	48	2	21	173	8.2	19	0	17	492	28.9	80	1	2	0

== Career awards and highlights ==
- AFC Champion (1999)
- 2× Pro Bowl selection (2000, 2003)
- All-Pro selection (2000)
- NFL punt return yards leader (2000)
- NFL All purpose yards leader (2000)
- 3× AFC Special Teams Player of the Week (Week 12, 1999, Week 4, 2000, Week 10, 2001)
- 10,000 Receiving Yards Club
- 15,000 All-Purpose Yards Club

=== NFL records ===
- All-purpose yards in a single season (2000): 2,690 (broken in 2011 by Darren Sproles)
- Kick return yards in a single postseason (1999): 437
- Combined kick & punt return yards in a single postseason (1999): 515
- Only player with 10,000 receiving yards and 5,000 return yards

=== Oilers/Titans franchise records ===
As of 2019's NFL off-season, Derrick Mason held at least 26 Titans franchise records, including:

- Most career combined kickoff and punt return yards (5,086)
- Most career punt returns (182)
- Most punt returns in a single season: 51 (2000)
- Most punt return yards in a single season: 662 (2000)
- Most all-purpose yards in a single season: 2,690 (2000)
- Most all-purpose yards (playoff career): 997
- Most Kick Returns (playoff career): 17
- Most Kick Returns (playoff season): 13 (1999)
- Most Kick Returns (playoff game): 5 (2000-01-30 STL Super Bowl; tied with Bobby Jancik and John Simon)
- Most Kick Ret Yds (playoff career): 492
- Most Kick Ret Yds (playoff season): 437 (1999)
- Most Kick Ret Yds (playoff game): 174 (2000-01-23 @JAX)
- Most Yds/KR (playoff career): 28.94
- Most Yds/KR (playoff season): 33.62 (1999)
- Most Yds/KR (playoff game): 43.5 (2000-01-23 @JAX)
- Most Kick Ret TDs (playoff career / season / game): 1 (2000-01-23 @JAX)
- Most Punt Returns (playoff career): 21
- Most Punt Returns (playoff season): 11 (1999)
- Most Punt Ret Yds (playoff career): 173
- Most Yds/PR (playoff game): 16.33 (2000-01-16 @IND)
- Most Total Return Yds (playoff career): 665
- Most Total Return Yds (playoff season): 515 (1999)

=== Ravens franchise records ===
- Most seasons with 1,000 receiving yards (4)
- Most career receiving yards (5,777) (broken by Mark Andrews in 2025)
- Most career receptions (471) (broken by Mark Andrews in 2025)
- Most receptions in a single season: 103 (2007) (broken by Mark Andrews in 2021 with 107)
- Most receptions per game in a single season: 6.4 (2007) (broken by Steve Smith Sr. in 2015 with 6.6)

=== Pro Bowl records ===
- Most returns in a single game: 8 (2004) (broken by Marc Mariani in 2011 with 9)

== Personal life ==
Mason and his wife, Marci, were married on June 7, 1997, and have a daughter, Bailee My-Lin and a son, Derrick James II. Marci is "The Derrick Mason Foundation" organization's vice president.

In 2012, Mason was hired as the wide receivers coach at Ensworth High School in Nashville, Tennessee alongside former teammate, linebackers coach, Lemanski Hall.

Mason is currently an afternoon radio host for 102.5 The Game, a sports station based in Nashville.

Mason has ownership stake in Nashville Company SWIFTWICK.
