= 2001 Tennessee Titans season =

42nd season in franchise history

- Owner: Bud Adams
- General manager: Floyd Reese
- Head coach: Jeff Fisher
- Home stadium: Adelphia Coliseum

Results
- Record: 7–9
- Division place: 4th AFC Central
- Playoffs: Did not qualify
- Pro Bowlers: C Bruce Matthews; DE Jevon Kearse

The 2001 Tennessee Titans season was the Titans' 42nd season and their 32nd in the National Football League (NFL). The team won only seven games and failed to qualify for the playoffs for the first time since 1998. After finishing 13–3 in the two prior seasons, defensive coordinator Gregg Williams was hired as the new head coach of the Buffalo Bills. Williams' departure contributed to the drop-off in wins, as the Titans went from second in scoring defense in 2000 to 25th in 2001. After the season, the Titans lost Bruce Matthews, who had been with the team since 1983 when they were the Houston Oilers, to retirement, ending a 19 year era for the team.

== Offseason ==
Additions	Subtractions
DE Kevin Carter (Rams)	S Marcus Robertson (Seahawks)
	LB Terry Killens (49ers)
	DE Kenny Holmes (Giants)
	CB Denard Walker (Broncos)

=== NFL draft ===
2001 Tennessee Titans draft
Round	Pick	Player	Position	College	Notes
2	60	Andre Dyson	Cornerback	Utah	
3	90	Shad Meier	Tight end	Kansas State	
4	124	Justin McCareins	Wide receiver	Northern Illinois	
5	159	Eddie Berlin	Wide receiver	Northern Iowa	
6	192	Dan Alexander	Fullback	Nebraska	
6	199	Adam Haayer	Offensive Tackle	Minnesota	
7	232	Keith Adams	Linebacker	Clemson	
Made roster

=== Undrafted free agents ===
2001 undrafted free agents of note
Player	Position	College
Donovan Arp	Defensive tackle	Louisville
Leo Barnes	Safety	Southern Miss
Rashad Bartholomew	Running back	Yale
Drew Bennett	Wide receiver	UCLA
Reed Diehl	Center	California
Barry Hall	Tackle	Middle Tennessee State
Shawn Johnson	Linebacker	Ole Miss
Chris Lorenti	Center	UCF
Chris Sanders	Quarterback	Chattanooga
Robby Snelling	Tight end	Boise State
Juqua Thomas	Linebacker	Oklahoma State
Chris Valletta	Guard	Texas A&M

== Personnel ==
=== Staff ===
2001 Tennessee Titans staff
Front office: Founder/owner/chairman of the board/CEO – Bud Adams; President/chief operating officer – Jeff Diamond; Executive VP/general manager/director of football operations – Floyd Reese; Director of player personnel – Rich Snead; Director of college scouting – Mike Ackerley; National coordinator of college scouting – C. O. Brocato; Head coaches: Executive vice president/head coach – Jeff Fisher; Assistant head coach/offense – George Henshaw; Assistant head coach – Gunther Cunningham; Offensive coaches: Offensive coordinator – Mike Heimerdinger; Running backs – Sherman Smith; Wide receivers – Steve Walters; Offensive line – Mike Munchak; Offensive assistant/quality control – Craig Johnson	Defensive coaches: Defensive coordinator – Jim Schwartz; Defensive line – Jim Washburn; Linebackers – Gunther Cunningham; Defensive backs – Everett Withers; Defensive assistant/quality control – Chuck Cecil; Special teams coaches: Special teams – Alan Lowry; Strength and conditioning: Strength and conditioning – Steve Watterson; Assistant strength and conditioning – Sammy Cribb

=== Roster ===
2001 Tennessee Titans roster
Quarterbacks (QB): 9 Steve McNair; 14 Neil O'Donnell; 12 Billy Volek; Running backs (RB): 36 Dan Alexander FB; 27 Eddie George; 20 Mike Green; 42 Skip Hicks; Wide receivers (WR): 19 Drew Bennett; 82 Eddie Berlin; 80 Chris Coleman; 87 Kevin Dyson; 85 Derrick Mason; 86 Justin McCareins; 81 Chris Sanders; Tight ends (TE): 88 Erron Kinney; 84 Shad Meier; 89 Frank Wycheck	Offensive linemen (OL): 66 Gennaro DiNapoli C; 61 Barry Hall T; 72 Brad Hopkins T; 60 Kevin Long C; 76 Jason Mathews T; 74 Bruce Matthews C; 71 Fred Miller T; 75 Benji Olson G; 71 Zach Piller G; Defensive linemen (DL): 93 Kevin Carter DE; 91 Josh Evans DT; 97 Jason Fisk DT; 92 Henry Ford DE; 90 Jevon Kearse DE; 99 Kris Kocurek DE; 95 Joe Salave'a DT; 98 Robaire Smith DT; 94 Juqua Thomas DE	Linebackers (LB): 53 Keith Bulluck OLB; 57 Frank Chamberlin MLB; 51 Greg Favors OLB; 56 Randall Godfrey MLB; 55 Eddie Robinson OLB; 59 Peter Sirmon OLB; 58 Byron Thweatt OLB; Defensive backs (DB): 33 Michael Booker CB; 22 Andre Dyson CB; 25 DeRon Jenkins CB; 30 Donald Mitchell CB; 28 Aric Morris SS; 35 Perry Phenix FS; 44 Daryl Porter S; 21 Samari Rolle CB; 29 Joe Walker FS; Special teams (ST): 15 Craig Hentrich P; 6 Joe Nedney K	Practice squad: 48 Brian Natkin TE; 79 Saul Patu DE; 83 Chris Taylor WR; 73 Tarlos Thomas T; Reserve: 23 Blaine Bishop S (IR); 96 Keith Embray DE (IR); 70 Adam Haayer T (IR); 32 Bobby Myers S (IR); 37 Dainon Sidney CB (IR); 78 John Thornton DT (IR); Rookies in italics 53 active, 6 reserve, 4 practice squad

== Schedule ==
=== Preseason ===
Week	Date	Opponent	Result	Record
1	August 11	Chicago Bears	W 27–24	1–0
2	August 17	at St. Louis Rams	W 23-10	2–0
3	August 23	Philadelphia Eagles	L 14–20	2–1
4	August 30	at Detroit Lions	W 28–25	3–1

=== Regular season ===
Week	Date	Opponent	Result	Record	Venue	Attendance
1	September 9	Miami Dolphins	L 23–31	0–1	Adelphia Coliseum	68,798
2 (Note: The Titans were originally scheduled to host the Cincinnati Bengals during Week 2 of the original NFL schedule (September 16) at Adelphia Coliseum. However, due to the September 11 attacks, the game was rescheduled to Week 17.)	September 23	at Jacksonville Jaguars	L 6–13	0–2	Alltel Stadium	65,994
3	Bye					
4	October 7	at Baltimore Ravens	L 7–26	0–3	PSINet Stadium	69,494
5	October 14	Tampa Bay Buccaneers	W 31–28	1–3	Adelphia Coliseum	68,798
6	October 21	at Detroit Lions	W 27–24	2–3	Pontiac Silverdome	76,940
7	October 29	at Pittsburgh Steelers	L 7–34	2–4	Heinz Field	63,763
8	November 4	Jacksonville Jaguars	W 28–24	3–4	Adelphia Coliseum	68,798
9	November 12	Baltimore Ravens	L 10–16	3–5	Adelphia Coliseum	68,798
10	November 18	at Cincinnati Bengals	W 20–7	4–5	Paul Brown Stadium	63,865
11	November 25	Pittsburgh Steelers	L 24–34	4–6	Adelphia Coliseum	68,801
12	December 2	at Cleveland Browns	W 31–15	5–6	Cleveland Browns Stadium	72,818
13	December 9	at Minnesota Vikings	L 24–42	5–7	Hubert H. Humphrey Metrodome	64,271
14	December 16	Green Bay Packers	W 26–20	6–7	Adelphia Coliseum	68,804
15	December 22	at Oakland Raiders	W 13–10	7–7	Network Associates Coliseum	61,934
16	December 30	Cleveland Browns	L 38–41	7–8	Adelphia Coliseum	68,798
17	January 6	Cincinnati Bengals	L 21–23	7–9	Adelphia Coliseum	68,798

== Standings ==
AFC Central
	W	L	T	PCT	PF	PA	STK
^{(1)} Pittsburgh Steelers	13	3	0	.813	352	212	W1
^{(5)} Baltimore Ravens	10	6	0	.625	303	265	W1
Cleveland Browns	7	9	0	.438	285	319	L1
Tennessee Titans	7	9	0	.438	336	388	L2
Jacksonville Jaguars	6	10	0	.375	294	286	L2
Cincinnati Bengals	6	10	0	.375	226	309	W2
