= Jordan Kramer =

American football player (born 1979)

No. 57
- Position: Linebacker

Personal information
- Born: December 7, 1979 (age 46); Parma, Idaho, U.S.
- Listed height: 6 ft 1 in (1.85 m)
- Listed weight: 230 lb (104 kg)

Career information
- High school: Parma
- College: Idaho (2000, 2002)

Career history
- Tennessee Titans (2003–2004)

Awards and highlights
- All-Sun Belt Conference (2002)

Career NFL statistics
- Games played: 4
- Tackles: 4
- Fumble recoveries: 1
- Stats at Pro Football Reference

Jordan Kramer (born December 7, 1979) is an American former professional football player who was a linebacker for the Tennessee Titans of the National Football League (NFL). Kramer played at college football for the Idaho Vandals. He is a son of NFL player Jerry Kramer.
