= National Register of Historic Places listings in Covington County, Mississippi =

Location of Covington County in Mississippi

This is a list of the National Register of Historic Places listings in Covington County, Mississippi.

This is intended to be a complete list of the properties and districts on the National Register of Historic Places in Covington County, Mississippi, United States. Latitude and longitude coordinates are provided for many National Register properties and districts; these locations may be seen together in a map.

There are 3 properties and districts listed on the National Register in the county.

This National Park Service list is complete through NPS recent listings posted October 23, 2026.

== Current listings ==
	Name on the Register	Image	Date listed	Location	City or town	Description
1	Carver Central High School		January 24, 2019 (#100003344)	104 Carver Dr. 31°38′48″N 89°33′54″W	Collins	
2	Covington County Courthouse	Covington County Courthouse	December 31, 1991 (#91001894)	Dogwood Avenue; 31°38′37″N 89°33′24″W	Collins	Constructed in 1907
3	Mount Olive Historic District	Mount Olive Historic District	October 8, 2019 (#100004507)	Roughly bounded by the N. & S. sides of Main St., extending from the jct. of Jaynesville Rd. to Old Hwy 49; 31°45′49″N 89°39′48″W	Mount Olive	

== See also ==
- List of National Historic Landmarks in Mississippi
- National Register of Historic Places listings in Mississippi
