= Fred McNair (gridiron football) =

American gridiron football player and coach (born 1968)

Personal information
- Born: December 11, 1968 (age 57); Mount Olive, Mississippi, U.S.

Career information
- College: Alcorn State
- NFL draft: 1990: undrafted

Career history

Playing
- Dallas Cowboys (1990)*; Toronto Argonauts (1991); London Monarchs (1992); Albany Firebirds (1993–1995); Florida Bobcats (1996–2000); Carolina Cobras (2000–2001); Buffalo Destroyers (2002)
- * Offseason or practice squad member only

Coaching
- Millsaps (2004–2008) Quarterbacks coach; Mount Olive HS (MS) (2009–2010) Offensive coordinator; Collins HS (MS) (2011) Head coach; Alcorn State (2013–2015) Quarterbacks coach; Alcorn State (2016–2023) Head coach; Southern (2024–2025) Tight ends coach; Southern (2025) Interim head coach

Awards and highlights
- As player: Grey Cup champion (79th); As coach: 2 SWAC (2018, 2019); 5 SWAC East Division (2016–2019, 2023)

Career AFL statistics
- Pass completions: 1,504
- Pass attempts: 2,626
- Passing yards: 19,352
- TD–INT: 340–71
- Passer rating: 101.62
- Stats at ArenaFan.com

Fred McNair (born December 11, 1968) is an American gridiron football coach and former player. He was most recently the interim head coach for Southern University. He was also the tight ends coach for Southern, a position he held in 2024 & 2025. He was the head football coach at Alcorn State University from 2016 to 2023. McNair played professionally as quarterback with the Toronto Argonauts in the Canadian Football League (CFL), the London Monarchs in the World League of American Football (WLAF), and the Florida Bobcats, Carolina Cobras, and Buffalo Destroyers of the Arena Football League (AFL). He played college football at Alcorn State. He is the brother of Steve McNair, a former Pro Bowl quarterback in the National Football League (NFL).

== Head coaching record ==
=== College ===
Year	Team	Overall	Conference	Standing	Bowl/playoffs
Alcorn State Braves (Southwestern Athletic Conference) (2016–2023)
2016	Alcorn State	5–6	5–4	1st (East)	
2017	Alcorn State	7–5	5–2	1st (East)	
2018	Alcorn State	9–4	6–1	1st (East)	L Celebration
2019	Alcorn State	9–4	6–1	1st (East)	L Celebration
2020	No team—COVID-19				
2021	Alcorn State	6–5	5–3	2nd (West)	
2022	Alcorn State	5–6	4–4	T–3rd (West)	
2023	Alcorn State	7–4	6–2	T–1st (West)	
Alcorn State:		48–33	37–17		
Southern Jaguars (Southwestern Athletic Conference) (2025–present)
2025	Southern	0–4	0–4	6th (West)	
Southern:		0–4	0–4		
Total:		48–37			
National championship Conference title Conference division title or championship game berth

=== High school ===
Year	Team	Overall	Conference	Standing	Bowl/playoffs
Collins Tigers () (2011)
2011	Collins	7–6	4–2	3rd	
Collins:		7–6	4–2		
Total:		7–6			
