= W. Ralph Eubanks =

American writer and professor

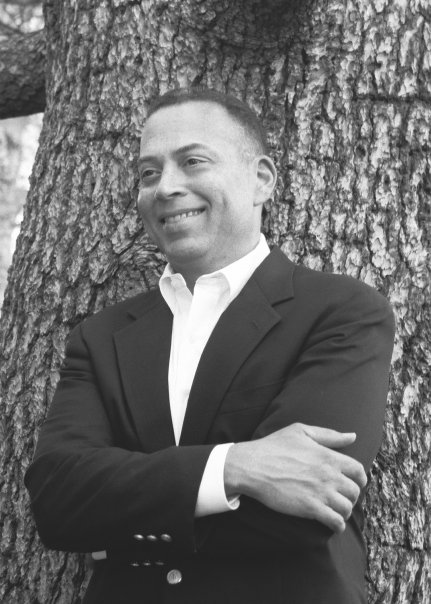
- Born: Warren Ralph Eubanks Jr. June 25, 1957 (age 69); Mount Olive, Mississippi, U.S.
- Education: University of Mississippi; University of Michigan
- Occupations: Author; Journalist; Professor; Public speaker; Director of Publishing, Library of Congress
- Spouse: Colleen Eubanks
- Children: 3
- Writing career
- Language: English
- Genres: History; Memoir
- Website: wralpheubanks.com

Warren Ralph Eubanks Jr. (born June 25, 1957) is an American author, essayist, journalist, professor, and public speaker. His work focuses on race, identity, and the culture and literature of the American South.

From 1995 until May 2013 he was the Director of Publishing of the Library of Congress in Washington, D.C. In June 2013, he became the editor of the Virginia Quarterly Review at the University of Virginia. He has served as an advisor and adjunct professor on staff at the University of Virginia and George Mason University.

In 2007, he was honored with a Guggenheim Fellowship, in recognition of his published memoir, Ever Is a Long Time: A Journey Into Mississippi's Dark Past, which The Washington Post book reviewer Jonathan Yardley named as one of the best nonfiction books of 2003. In May 2021 he was named the Lily Pforzheimer Foundation Fellow at the Radcliffe Institute at Harvard University for the 2021-2022 academic year. During his year at the Radcliffe Institute, Eubanks began work on his fourth work of nonfiction When It's Darkness on the Delta: How America's Richest Soil Became Its Poorest Land.

== Early life and education ==
Warren Ralph Eubanks Jr. was born on June 25, 1957, in Mount Olive, Mississippi. He is the son of Warren Ralph Eubanks Sr. and Lucille (née Richardson) Eubanks. He graduated in 1974 from Mount Olive High School. Following high school, he enrolled at the University of Mississippi, earning a Bachelor's degree in English and Psychology. During his senior year, he served as the President of the Sigma Tau Delta collegiate honor society, which focused on the study of English and Literature. In 1978, he moved to Ann Arbor, Michigan, where he enrolled at the University of Michigan, graduating in 1979, with a master's degree in English Language and Literature.

== Career ==
=== Publishing ===
In 1980, following completion of his master's degree, Eubanks began his career in publishing, working with the American Geophysical Union as a copy editor. He remained with the organization through 1984. In 1989, he began serving on the editorial staff of Hemisphere Publishing, where he remained for two years. As Managing Editor, he oversaw the production of over 75 books and scholarly journals. In 1990, he began working with the American Psychological Association, where he served as the Director of Book Publishing for five years. In 1995, he joined the staff of the Library of Congress as the Director of Publishing.

In May 2013 he was announced as the new editor of the Virginia Quarterly Review. Eubanks left VQR in February 2015, after editing six print issues, when he was told that his contract would not be renewed. Ron Charles, editor of The Washington Post's Book World, had praised VQR's "refreshing range of voices" under Eubanks's leadership in a January 5, 2015, article. A January 9, 2015 article in The Chronicle of Higher Education noted that Eubanks's departure "may provide lessons about how, and even whether, universities should manage their sponsorship of literary journals."

=== Academia ===
While Eubanks was working with the American Psychological Association, he simultaneously served as a faculty advisor for Howard University's summer book publishing program. He remained with the program from 1992 to 1994. From 1994 until 2002, he served as an advisor and adjunct professor on staff at the University of Virginia, where he worked with the Publishing and Communications Institute. While at the Institute, he taught a publishing overview class "The World of Publishing," a class called "The Business of Publishing," and was a guest lecturer in the University of Virginia's Summer Publishing Institute. In 2009, he taught a class on writing the memoir in the MFA program at George Mason University. From January through December 2016, Eubanks served as the Eudora Welty Visiting Professor in Southern Studies at Millsaps College in Jackson, Mississippi. While at Millsaps, Eubanks taught a creative writing course on "Crafting the Personal Essay," as well as the literature classes "Photography and Literature," "Civil Rights and Literature," "The African American Memoir," and "On Faith and Fiction." From 2017 to 2021, Eubanks served as Visiting Professor of Southern Studies and English at the University of Mississippi. Since 2022, he has been Faculty Fellow and Writer in Residence at the Center for the Study of Southern Culture at the University of Mississippi.

=== Writing ===
Books

Eubanks is the author of two memoirs of his life and family. His 2003 book, Ever Is a Long Time: A Journey into Mississippi's Dark Past, was recognized as one of the best nonfiction books of the year by The Washington Post book reviewer Jonathan Yardley. In 2009, Eubanks' memoir, The House at the End of the Road: The Story of Three Generations of an Interracial Family in the American South, was published by HarperCollins. The historical biography takes a look at American identity and race relations, beginning with his maternal grandparents and presented in context with contemporary issues undergone by three generations of his family. In March 2021, A Place Like Mississippi: A Journey Through A Real and Imagined Literary Landscape was published by Timber Press. In the Georgia Review, KaToya Ellis Fleming wrote "Reading A Place Like Mississippi is as much a visceral experience as it is an intellectual one, even down to the supple feel of the pages and the soft, elegant texture of the book in your hands."

In January 2026, Eubanks published his fourth work of nonfiction When It's Darkness on the Delta: How America's Richest Soil Became Its Poorest Land with Beacon Press. The book blends history, memoir, and narrative nonfiction to explore not only the Mississippi Delta but the origins of American income inequality. As Eubanks writes in When It's Darkness on the Delta, "Only by looking at both the forces of history and the way we live now can we begin to understand not only the Mississippi Delta, but also the forces of inequality that have shaped America itself. That means the story of the people of the Delta is not just a Mississippi story. Nor is it just a Southern story. At its very core, the Delta’s story is an American story."

Journalism

Eubanks has written numerous newspaper and magazine articles, primarily focusing on academia and race relations. On January 1, 2006, he wrote an article for The Washington Post, entitled "DNA Is Only One Way to Spell Identity". On June 13, 2006, his article "Still Learning From Dad" was published in The Washington Post. His article "At Ole Miss, a Valedictory to the Old South" was published by The Washington Post on September 21, 2008.

Eubanks has also written articles for Preservation Magazine, published by the National Trust for Historic Preservation. His articles include "A Southern Awakening", published in the September/October 2003 issue; and "Separate But Unequal", published in the July/August 2005 issue.

He also wrote an article on affirmative action for The American Scholar. Articles for the Chicago Tribune include "A Trip Back Home for a Lesson in Justice". Other works include "The Land the Internet Era Forgot" in WIRED, "Atticus Finch Confronted What the South Couldn't" in TIME, "Mississippi, The Two-Flag State" in The New Yorker, and "Color Lines" in The American Scholar.

In addition to such articles, Eubanks has written book reviews for The Washington Post and The Wall Street Journal. These include reviews for My Generation by William Styron, Down to the Crossroads by Aram GoudsouzianSarah Johnson's Mount Vernon by Scott E. Casper, Cutting for Stone by Abraham Verghese, and Them by Nathan McCall. He also reviewed the book A Father's Law, written by Richard Wright, which was unfinished at the time of Wright's death in 1960. In 2008, Wright's daughter, Julia, finished the book and published it posthumously in his honor, on what would have been his 100th birthday.

=== Radio ===
Eubanks has appeared in radio interviews on race relations for National Public Radio. In 2004, he appeared on All Things Considered, where he spoke about the 1964 murder of three American civil rights workers, James Chaney, Andrew Goodman, and Michael Schwerner, whose deaths were attributed to members of the Ku Klux Klan.

On July 27, 2009, Eubanks appeared as a guest on Talk of the Nation, speaking on race relations and police conduct in the aftermath of the 2009 arrest of Henry Louis Gates Jr. at his home in Cambridge, Massachusetts.

== Personal life ==
Eubanks lives in Chicago, Illinois., with his wife, Colleen (née Delaney) Eubanks. He has three adult children.

He is Catholic.

== Honors and awards ==
- 2007 Guggenheim Fellowship with the John Simon Guggenheim Foundation
- The Bernard L. Schwartz Fellowship with the New America Foundation
- 2021–2022 Carl and Lily Pforzheimer Foundation Fellow, Radcliffe Institute for Advanced Study, Harvard University.
- 2023 Mississippi Governor's Arts Award, Excellence in Literature and Cultural Ambassador.
- 2023–2024 Society of American Travel Writers Foundation, Lowell Thomas Award, First Place for Coverage of Diverse Communities

== Published works ==
Books

- Eubanks, W. Ralph (2003). Ever Is a Long Time: A Journey Into Mississippi's Dark Past, Basic Books, 256 pages. ISBN 978-0738205700
- Eubanks, W. Ralph (2009). The House at the End of the Road: The Story of Three Generations of an Interracial Family in the American South, HarperCollins/Smithsonian, 224 pages. ISBN 978-0061375736
- Eubanks, W. Ralph (2021). "A Place Like Mississippi: A Journey Through a Real and Imagined Literary Landscape", Timber Press, 268 pages. ISBN 978-1604699586

Articles

- "DNA Is Only One Way to Spell Identity", The Washington Post January 1, 2006.
- "Still Learning From Dad", The Washington Post, June 13, 2006
- "At Ole Miss, a Valedictory to the Old South", The Washington Post, September 21, 2008
- "Retranslating the Blues" The Hedgehog Review, Summer 2025.
