= Charlotte Kohler =

American literary magazine editor and professor

- Born: September 16, 1908; Richmond, Virginia, U.S.
- Died: September 15, 2008 (aged 99); Charlottesville, Virginia, U.S.
- Resting place: Hollywood Cemetery
- Education: Vassar College
- Employer: University of Virginia
- Title: Editor of Virginia Quarterly Review
- Term: 29
- Predecessor: Archibald Bolling Shepperson
- Successor: Staige D. Blackford

Charlotte Kohler (September 16, 1908 – September 15, 2008) was a literary magazine editor and a university professor. She was born in Richmond, Virginia, attended the city's John Marshall High School, graduated from Vassar College, and obtained both a master's and a PhD from the University of Virginia. As a woman, she was not able to gain employment as an English professor in Virginia, so she taught for two years at Woman's College of the University of North Carolina.

UVa hired Kohler in 1942 to serve as the managing editor of the university's Virginia Quarterly Review, selecting her to succeed Archibald Shepperson in part because, as a woman, she was not subject to the draft that was sending many of the United States' men overseas to fight in World War II, making her "war-proof". Despite her title, she functioned as editor, a position to which she was formally named in 1946, the sixth person to hold the title at the publication. She remained as editor for nearly 30 years before retiring in 1975 with the Review's 50th anniversary edition, making her the longest-serving editor in the Review's history. During her tenure she reviewed an estimated 90,000 manuscripts, selecting from among them and publishing many previously unknown authors, including Hayden Carruth, Nadine Gordimer, and Adrienne Rich.

Female editors of literary magazines were very rare during her time, and it was her role as a pathbreaker that led to her award of an honorary doctorate from Smith College in 1971. Kohler was also the first female Phi Beta Kappa at UVa, and one of the first women to receive a doctorate from the university.

Kohler was reclusive in retirement. She granted no interviews after 1975, and declined invitations to events. She never married, and had no children. She died on September 15, 2008, of congestive heart failure in her home in Charlottesville, Virginia, one day before what would have been her 100th birthday. She was buried in Hollywood Cemetery.
