= Collins High School =

Collins High School can refer to a number of educational institutions in the United States:

- Collins Academy High School in Chicago
- Collins High School (Mississippi) in Collins, Mississippi
- Collins High School, the former name of Oak Hill High School in Oak Hill, West Virginia
- Martha Layne Collins High School in Shelbyville, Kentucky
