= Sanford, Mississippi =

- Unincorporated community
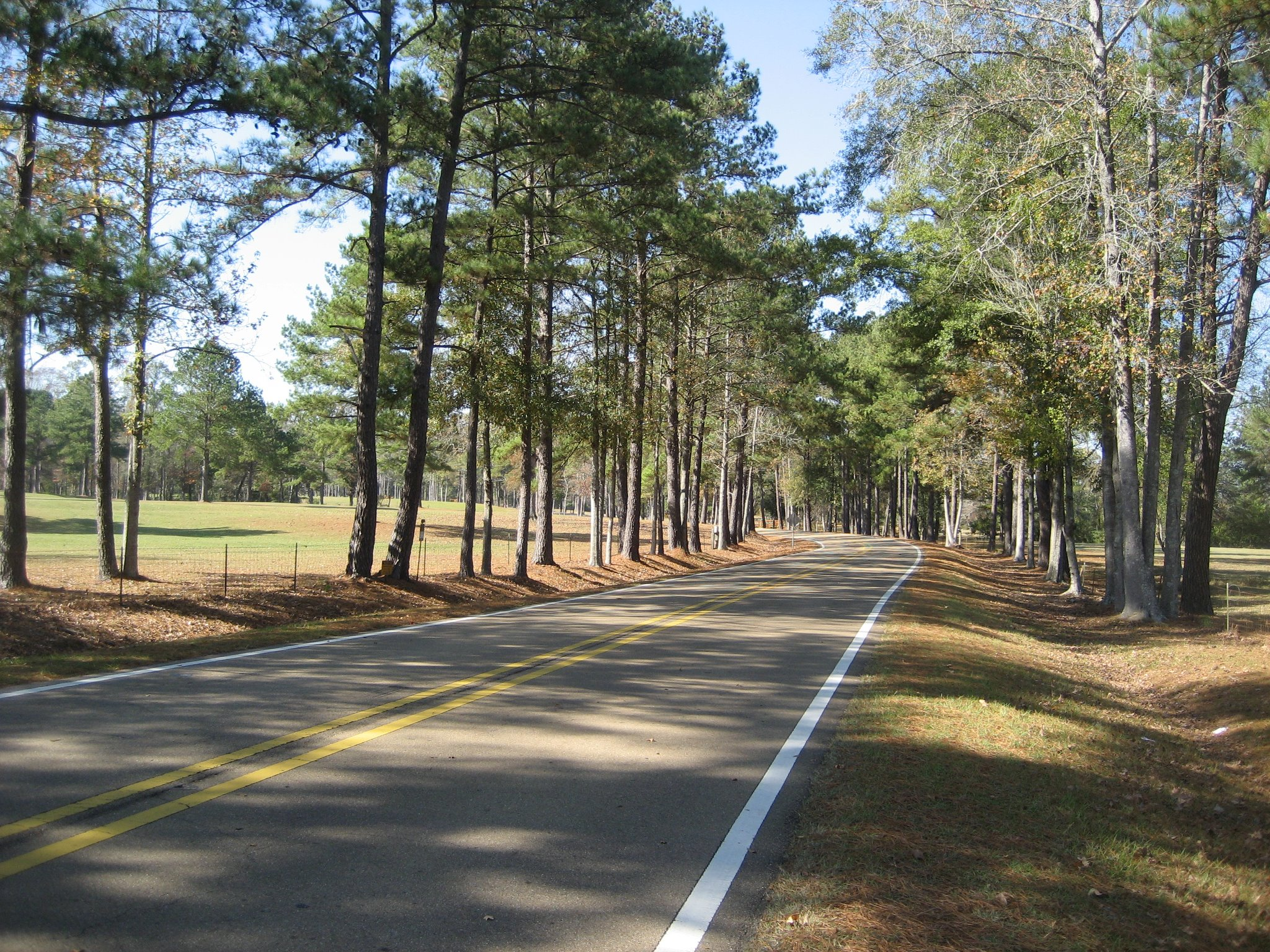
- A scenic stretch of Highway 598 in Sanford

- Location within Mississippi Location within the United States
- Coordinates: 31°29′13″N 89°25′37″W
- Country: United States
- State: Mississippi
- County: Covington
- Elevation: 207 ft (63 m)
- Time zone: UTC-6 (Central (CST))
  - Summer (DST): UTC-5 (CDT)
- Area codes: 601 & 769
- GNIS feature ID: 677399

Sanford is an unincorporated community in Covington County, Mississippi, United States.

== History ==
=== Early history ===
The Sanford community was very sparsely populated at the turn of the 18th century. The "founding families" began arriving in the early 1800s. The Bulloch (also spelled "Bullock"), Sanford, Morris, Bryant, and Lowry families arrived to the area in the 1810s and 1820s. These families were farmers, and many intermarried with the other families in the area. Other families to the area were the Folkes, Ingram, and Mooney families.

As throughout the Piney Woods region, there was a timber boom in the area in the latter part of the 1800s. One of the largest sawmills was owned by John D. Sanford, whose father, Rev. John Sanford, was one of the first settlers to the area, having come in 1818. The area began to be called "Sanford" after John D. Sanford, who was likely the largest employer. After the timber boom and bust in the late 1800s, strawberries began to be planted in huge quantities in the old timber fields.

Sanford is located on the former Gulf and Ship Island Railroad and was once home to two general stores.

A post office operated under the name Sanford from 1894 to 1977.

=== Modern-Day Sanford ===
Sanford has experienced significant growth over the last few decades, most likely as a result of its close proximity to Hattiesburg, a city of nearly 50,000. Sanford is just a 15-minute drive from Hattiesburg. In the 10-year period between 2000 and 2010, the Sanford community grew by nearly 15%, which compared favorably to Covington County's growth rate of 1%, Mississippi's growth rate of 4%, and the United States' growth rate of 8%. This growth has been nearly all residential.

== Culture ==
=== Religion ===
The Sanford community, as a part of the Bible Belt, is very religious and very Protestant. Churches in the Sanford area include First Baptist Sanford, Sanford Missionary Baptist, Union Baptist, Bethel Missionary Baptist, and the Independent Full Gospel Church.

=== Politics ===
Sanford is a very conservative Republican community, having voted for the Republican candidate for president by a wide margin in each presidential election for more than three decades. The Sanford precinct's election results:

Presidential elections results
Year	Republican	Democratic	Other
2012	88.4% (700)	10.2% (81)	1.4% (11)
2008	89.4% (732)	10% (81)	0.7% (6)
2004	87.8% (623)	11.7% (83)	0.03% (2)

== Demographics ==
=== 2010 census ===
As of the census of 2010, there were 1,828 people living in the Sanford voting precinct. The racial makeup of the community was 96.3% white and 3.7% African American.

== Education ==
The Sanford community is served by the Covington County School District. Students from the Sanford area attend Seminary Schools, of which there is an elementary, a middle, and a high school. All three are located together on Main Street. Seminary High School is classified as a size 3A under the Mississippi High School Activities Association. In 2011, there were more than 1,300 students in grades K-12. The school's colors have traditionally been red and white, but blue has been added to school jerseys in recent years. Seminary High School's mascot is Champ the Bulldog.
