= Covington County School District =

Covington County School District may refer to:

- Covington County School District (Mississippi)
- Covington County Board of Education (Alabama)
