= Mount Olive, Mississippi =

- Town
- Downtown Mount Olive

- Location of Mount Olive, Mississippi

- Location in the United States
- Coordinates: 31°45′24″N 89°39′13″W
- Country: United States
- State: Mississippi
- County: Covington

Area
  - Total: 3.10 sq mi (8.02 km^{2})
  - Land: 3.10 sq mi (8.02 km^{2})
  - Water: 0 sq mi (0.00 km^{2})
- Elevation: 335 ft (102 m)

Population (2020)
  - Total: 895
  - Density: 288.9/sq mi (111.56/km^{2})
- Time zone: UTC-6 (Central (CST))
  - Summer (DST): UTC-5 (CDT)
- ZIP code: 39119
- Area code: 601
- FIPS code: 28-49520
- GNIS feature ID: 0674103
- Website: Town website

Mount Olive is a town in Covington County, Mississippi, United States. The population was 895 at the 2020 census.

== History ==
The town of Mount Olive was incorporated on May 18, 1900, making the town older than Magee to the north and older than Collins to the south. The railroad tracks were completed in 1899. The population of Mount Olive in 2016 was 975.

== Geography ==
U.S. Route 49, a four-lane divided highway, follows the western border of the town and leads northwest 52 miles (84 km) to Jackson, the state capital, and 38 miles (61 km) southeast to Hattiesburg. Mississippi Highway 35 passes through the southern end of town and leads northeast 10 miles (16 km) to Mize and southwest 39 miles (63 km) to Columbia.

According to the United States Census Bureau, the town has a total area of 3.1 square miles (8.0 km^{2}), all land. It is in the valley of Okatoma Creek, part of the Pascagoula River watershed.

== Demographics ==
Historical population
Census	Pop.	Note	%±
1910	1,077		—
1920	778		−27.8%
1930	812		4.4%
1940	775		−4.6%
1950	827		6.7%
1960	841		1.7%
1970	923		9.8%
1980	993		7.6%
1990	914		−8.0%
2000	893		−2.3%
2010	982		10.0%
2020	895		−8.9%
U.S. Decennial Census

=== Racial and ethnic composition ===
Mount Olive town, Mississippi – Racial and ethnic composition Note: the US Census treats Hispanic/Latino as an ethnic category. This table excludes Latinos from the racial categories and assigns them to a separate category. Hispanics/Latinos may be of any race.
Race / Ethnicity (NH = Non-Hispanic)	Pop 2000	Pop 2010	Pop 2020	% 2000	% 2010	% 2020
White alone (NH)	416	419	290	46.58%	42.67%	32.40%
Black or African American alone (NH)	463	541	574	51.85%	55.09%	64.13%
Native American or Alaska Native alone (NH)	0	2	0	0.00%	0.20%	0.00%
Asian alone (NH)	0	0	0	0.00%	0.00%	0.00%
Native Hawaiian or Pacific Islander alone (NH)	1	2	0	0.11%	0.20%	0.00%
Other race alone (NH)	0	0	1	0.00%	0.00%	0.11%
Mixed race or Multiracial (NH)	8	9	21	0.90%	0.92%	2.35%
Hispanic or Latino (any race)	5	9	9	0.56%	0.92%	1.01%
Total	893	982	895	100.00%	100.00%	100.00%

=== 2020 census ===
As of the 2020 United States census, there were 895 people, 589 households, and 492 families residing in the town.

=== 2000 census ===
As of the census of 2000, there were 893 people, 348 households, and 239 families residing in the town. The population density was 738.5 inhabitants per square mile (285.1/km^{2}). There were 396 housing units at an average density of 327.5 per square mile (126.4/km^{2}). The racial makeup of the town was 46.81% White, 51.96% African American, 0.11% Pacific Islander, and 1.12% from two or more races. Hispanic or Latino of any race were 0.56% of the population.

There were 348 households, out of which 33.3% had children under the age of 18 living with them, 37.4% were married couples living together, 25.0% had a female householder with no husband present, and 31.3% were non-families. 30.5% of all households were made up of individuals, and 14.1% had someone living alone who was 65 years of age or older. The average household size was 2.57 and the average family size was 3.19.

In the town, the population was spread out, with 30.5% under the age of 18, 8.5% from 18 to 24, 25.3% from 25 to 44, 21.8% from 45 to 64, and 13.9% who were 65 years of age or older. The median age was 35 years. For every 100 females, there were 83.7 males. For every 100 females age 18 and over, there were 76.4 males.

The median income for a household in the town was $22,019, and the median income for a family was $26,146. Males had a median income of $26,250 versus $16,719 for females. The per capita income for the town was $11,008. About 26.9% of families and 34.2% of the population were below the poverty line, including 47.4% of those under age 18 and 24.6% of those age 65 or over.

== Education ==
The town of Mount Olive is served by the Covington County School District. It is served by Mount Olive Elementary School and Mount Olive High School.

== Notable people ==
- Rose Bascom (1922-1993), trick roper, trick rider, Hollywood movie actress, Mississippi Rodeo Hall of Fame inductee
- Howard Easterling, Negro league baseball third baseman
- W. Ralph Eubanks, author, journalist, professor
- Fred McNair, former professional football quarterback and head coach of Alcorn State and the brother of Steve McNair
- Steve McNair (1973-2009), All-Pro quarterback for the Tennessee Titans
- Hannah Roberts, Miss Mississippi 2015, 1st runner-up to Miss America 2016
