= Virginia Quarterly Review =

American literary magazine

- Editor: Paul Reyes
- Categories: Literary journal
- Frequency: Quarterly
- Publisher: University of Virginia
- First issue: 1925
- Country: United States
- Website: www.vqronline.org
- ISSN: 0042-675X
- OCLC: 605090813

The Virginia Quarterly Review is a quarterly literary magazine that was established in 1925 by James Southall Wilson, at the request of University of Virginia president E. A. Alderman. This "National Journal of Literature and Discussion" includes poetry, fiction, book reviews, essays, photography, and comics.

== History ==
In 1915, President Alderman announced his intentions to create a university publication that would be "an organ of liberal opinion":

I take leave again to bring before you a dream: a magazine solidly based, thoughtfully and wisely managed and controlled, not seeking to give news, but to become a great serious publication wherein shall be reflected the calm thought of the best men.

He appealed to financial backers of the university for financial contributions, and over the next nine years an endowment was raised to fund the publication while it became established. Alderman announced the establishment of The Virginia Quarterly Review in the fall of 1924, saying it would provide:

independent thought in the fields of society, politics, and literature ... in no sense a local or sectional publication ... [but inviting] as contributors to its pages men and women everywhere who think through things and have some quality of expressing their thoughts in appealing and arresting fashion.

The inaugural issue was released in the spring of 1925, and the 160-page volume featured writing by Gamaliel Bradford, Archibald Henderson, Luigi Pirandello, Witter Bynner, William Cabell Bruce, among two dozen other notable, mostly southern, writers.

=== Editors ===
The following persons have been editors-in-chief of the magazine:

- James Southall Wilson 1925–1931
- Stringfellow Barr 1931–1937
- Lambert Davis 1937–1938
- Lawrence Lee 1938–1942
- Archibald Bolling Shepperson 1942
- Charlotte Kohler 1942–1974
- Staige D. Blackford 1974–2003
- Ted Genoways 2003–2012
- Donovan Webster 2012
- W. Ralph Eubanks 2013–2015
- Paul Reyes 2016–present

== Awards ==
Since 2005, the magazine has been nominated for twenty-eight National Magazine Awards. In addition to six wins for General Excellence (2006), Fiction (2006), Single-Topic Issue (2008), News Reporting in the Digital Medium (2010), Fiction (2011), and Multimedia Package (2011), the magazine received nominations for Reporting, Essays, Reviews and Criticism, Photography, and Photojournalism.

In 2012, Maisie Crow's video "Half-Lives," produced for the VQR website, received the Overseas Press Club Award for Best Use of Online Video. The video also received second place in the World Press Photo Multimedia Contest and third place in the Pictures of the Year International competition for Long Form Multimedia Story.

Since 2006, the magazine has received Utne Reader magazine's Utne Independent Press Award for General Excellence (2009) and International Coverage (2010).

== Morrissey suicide and temporary publication suspension ==
During July 2010 managing editor Kevin Morrissey repeatedly complained to university officials about editor Ted Genoways' treatment of him. On July 30, 2010, Morrissey shot himself, after first calling 911 to report his own shooting. Press reports accused Genoways of harassing and bullying Morrissey. Genoways denied the bullying and in an August 1 e-mail to VQR writers said he did not "feel responsible" for Morrissey's death.

After staffers had completed most work on the VQR Fall issue to be published in Morrissey's memory, in August 2010 Genoways took charge of the issue. Staffers removed their names from the masthead in protest, and subsequently the entire staff resigned. National and local media devoted extensive coverage to the situation and the conflicting accounts of what happened. A documentary titled "What Killed Kevin" revisited Genoways' relationship with Morrissey and the time leading up to the suicide.

New university president Teresa Sullivan called for a "thorough review" of both financial and managerial practices at the magazine. In the meantime the university had put the Winter issue of VQR "on hold," to "let the internal review progress." The university later stated that it was cancelling the Winter issue, and stated it might publish a "bonus issue" at some future date, or reimburse subscribers for the cancelled issue.

After completing its investigation, in a controversial report published October 20, 2010, the university concluded that, because there were "no specific allegations of bullying or harassment" prior to Mr. Morrissey's death, the university would not fire Mr. Genoways—and Mr. Genoways wrote in an e-mail to the New York Times that he would be "remaining on as editor." The university stated its intent to reorganize VQR under a new reporting structure, bring its finances under outside supervision, and revise "how employees report [problems] and receive assistance."

Despite the temporary suspension, VQR never skipped an issue and resumed publication in late January 2011, marking "the start of its 87th year of continuous publication." In December 2011, about fourteen months after one newspaper said "the award-winning Virginia Quartlerly Review might have appeared on the verge of extinction," the university announced it was hiring a new publisher and a new deputy editor; Mr. Genoways remained as editor.

In April 2012 Genoways resigned, saying: "I look back on my nine years as editor with pride, but I also hope that the new staff will not feel in any way encumbered by that legacy."

== Continuation under new staff ==
In 2013, VQR named W. Ralph Eubanks, then director of publishing at the Library of Congress, as its ninth editor. He joined a new publisher, deputy editor, web editor, and assistant editor on the new staff. For its issues under his directorship, VQR received numerous awards, including a Pushcart Prize as well as selections for the Best American Science Writing anthology and the Best American Travel Writing anthology. Nevertheless, Eubanks was ousted in 2015 following a dispute with the university.

== See also ==
- List of literary magazines
