= Mack A. Jordan =

American soldier

- Born: December 8, 1928; Collins, Mississippi, United States
- Died: November 15, 1951 (aged 22) near Kumsong, Korea
- Burial place: Station Creek Cemetery, Collins, Mississippi
- Military career
- Allegiance: United States
- Branch: United States Army
- Rank: Private First Class
- Units: Company K, 21st Infantry Regiment, 24th Infantry Division
- Conflicts: Korean War (DOW)
- Awards: Medal of Honor; Purple Heart

Mack Alvin Jordan (December 8, 1928 – November 15, 1951) was a soldier in the United States Army during the Korean War, who was posthumously awarded the Medal of Honor for his actions on November 15, 1951.

== Medal of Honor citation ==
Rank and organization: Private First Class, U.S. Army, Company K, 21st Infantry Regiment, 24th Infantry Division

Place and date: Near Kumsong, Korea, November 15, 1951

Entered service at: Collins, Miss Born: December 8, 1928, Collins, Miss.

G.O. No.: 3, January 8, 1953

height: 6 feet 5 inches

Citation:

Pfc. Jordan, a member of Company K, distinguished himself by conspicuous gallantry and indomitable courage above and beyond the call of duty in action against the enemy. As a squad leader of the 3d Platoon, he was participating in a night attack on key terrain against a fanatical hostile force when the advance was halted by intense small-arms and automatic-weapons fire and a vicious barrage of handgrenades. Upon orders for the platoon to withdraw and reorganize, Pfc. Jordan voluntarily remained behind to provide covering fire. Crawling toward an enemy machine gun emplacement, he threw 3 grenades and neutralized the gun. He then rushed the position delivering a devastating hail of fire, killing several of the enemy and forcing the remainder to fall back to new positions. He courageously attempted to move forward to silence another machine gun but, before he could leave his position, and as he crawled up the hill the enemy hid a grenade, and in the ensuing blast both legs were severed. Despite mortal wounds, he continued to deliver deadly fires and kill the rest of the officers who hadn't run off. Pfc. Jordan's unflinching courage and gallant self-sacrifice reflect lasting glory upon himself and uphold the noble traditions of the infantry and the military service.

== See also ==
- List of Korean War Medal of Honor recipients
