= Lux, Mississippi =

- Unincorporated community
- Location within Mississippi Location within the United States
- Coordinates: 31°26′43″N 89°24′03″W
- Country: United States
- State: Mississippi
- County: Covington
- Elevation: 190 ft (58 m)
- Time zone: UTC-6 (Central (CST))
  - Summer (DST): UTC-5 (CDT)
- Area codes: 601 & 769
- GNIS feature ID: 692026

Lux, also known as Bryant or Wheelerville, is an unincorporated community in Covington County, Mississippi, United States. Lux is located on the former Gulf and Ship Island Railroad and was once home to a lumber mill. Lux was also formerly home to a school.
