= Ora, Mississippi =

- Unincorporated community
- Location within Mississippi Location within the United States
- Coordinates: 31°39′28″N 89°34′28″W
- Country: United States
- State: Mississippi
- County: Covington
- Elevation: 299 ft (91 m)
- Time zone: UTC-6 (Central (CST))
  - Summer (DST): UTC-5 (CDT)
- Area codes: 601 & 769
- GNIS feature ID: 675300

Ora is an unincorporated community in Covington County, Mississippi, United States. It was incorporated in 1901 and had a post office from 1890 until 1922. Ora's population grew from 28 in 1900 to several hundred by 1920, and it was once home to six general stores, two lumber companies, and a sawmill. It was a station on the Gulf and Ship Island Railroad. Closure of the station was requested in 1921.
