= Covington County, Mississippi =

County in Mississippi, United States

- County
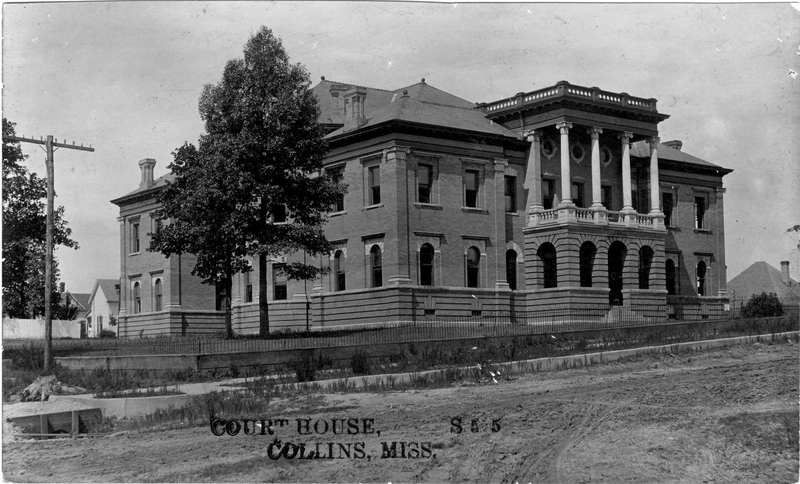
- Covington County Courthouse

- Location within the U.S. state of Mississippi
- Coordinates: 31°38′N 89°33′W
- Country: United States
- State: Mississippi
- Founded: 1819
- Named for: Leonard Covington
- Seat: Collins
- Largest city: Collins

Area
  - Total: 415 sq mi (1,070 km^{2})
  - Land: 414 sq mi (1,070 km^{2})
  - Water: 1.1 sq mi (2.8 km^{2}) 0.3%

Population (2020)
  - Total: 18,340
  - Estimate (2025): 17,898 ▼
  - Density: 44.3/sq mi (17.1/km^{2})
- Time zone: UTC−6 (Central)
  - Summer (DST): UTC−5 (CDT)
- Congressional district: 3rd
- Website: www.covingtoncountyms.gov

Covington County is a county located in the U.S. state of Mississippi. As of the 2020 census, the population was 18,340. Its county seat is Collins. The county is named for U.S. Army officer and Congressman Leonard Covington.

== History ==
Covington County was established on January 5, 1819, less than two years after Mississippi earned statehood into the Union. The county was one of the first counties established out of the vast non-agricultural lands in the more eastern part of the state. Covington was originally cut out of Lawrence and Wayne Counties, and encompassed what is now Jefferson Davis, Covington, and Jones Counties.

In 1823, part of Covington County became Bainbridge County, most likely named after William Bainbridge, who became an American naval hero during the War of 1812. The next year, in 1824, the Mississippi legislature did away with Bainbridge County, giving its lands back to Covington County.

== Geography ==
According to the U.S. Census Bureau, the county has a total area of 415 square miles (1,070 km^{2}), of which 414 square miles (1,070 km^{2}) is land and 1.1 square miles (2.8 km^{2}) (0.3%) is water.

=== Adjacent counties ===
- Smith County (north)
- Jones County (east)
- Forrest County (southeast)
- Lamar County (south)
- Jefferson Davis County (west)
- Simpson County (northwest)

== Transportation ==
=== Major highways ===
- U.S. Highway 49
- U.S. Highway 84

Covington County is crossed both north-to-south and east-to-west by four-laned state highways. Highway 49, which runs north–south through all three municipalities and is commonly known as Mississippi's Main Street, connects the state's three largest cities—Jackson, Gulfport, and Hattiesburg—to Covington County as well as cities such as Wiggins, Magee, Clinton, and Yazoo City. Highway 49 brings to Covington County thousands each day.

Highway 84 cuts across Covington County east to west, and runs through the City of Collins. Highway 84 connects the mid-size cities of Laurel, Brookhaven, and Natchez to Covington County.

=== Minor highways ===
A network of two-laned highways runs through Covington County, connecting big cities and small communities alike. Main Street Collins is Highway 184, formerly Highway 84. Main Street Seminary is Highway 590. Others include:

- Mississippi Highway 35 (Mt. Olive, Mize, Raleigh)
- Mississippi Highway 37 (Collins to Taylorsville)
- Mississippi Highway 184 (Collins)
- Mississippi Highway 588 (Collins to Ellisville)
- Mississippi Highway 598 (Sanford)
- Mississippi Highway 589 (Seminary, Sumrall, Purvis)
- Mississippi Highway 590 (Seminary to Ellisville)
- Mississippi Highway 532 (Mt. Olive to Hopewell)
- Mississippi Highway 535 (Seminary to Collins)

== Demographics ==
Historical population
Census	Pop.	Note	%±
1820	2,230		—
1830	2,551		14.4%
1840	2,717		6.5%
1850	3,338		22.9%
1860	4,408		32.1%
1870	4,753		7.8%
1880	5,993		26.1%
1890	8,299		38.5%
1900	13,076		57.6%
1910	16,909		29.3%
1920	14,869		−12.1%
1930	15,028		1.1%
1940	17,030		13.3%
1950	16,036		−5.8%
1960	13,637		−15.0%
1970	14,002		2.7%
1980	15,927		13.7%
1990	16,527		3.8%
2000	19,407		17.4%
2010	19,568		0.8%
2020	18,340		−6.3%
2025 (est.)	17,898	▼	−2.4%
U.S. Decennial Census; 1790-1960 1900-1990; 1990-2000 2010-2013

=== Racial and ethnic composition ===
Covington County, Mississippi – Racial and ethnic composition Note: the US Census treats Hispanic/Latino as an ethnic category. This table excludes Latinos from the racial categories and assigns them to a separate category. Hispanics/Latinos may be of any race.
Race / Ethnicity (NH = Non-Hispanic)	Pop 1980	Pop 1990	Pop 2000	Pop 2010	Pop 2020	% 1980	% 1990	% 2000	% 2010	% 2020
White alone (NH)	10,383	10,671	12,249	12,202	11,047	65.19%	64.57%	63.12%	62.36%	60.23%
Black or African American alone (NH)	5,419	5,779	6,860	6,798	6,384	34.02%	34.97%	35.35%	34.74%	34.81%
Native American or Alaska Native alone (NH)	1	9	24	20	20	0.01%	0.05%	0.12%	0.10%	0.11%
Asian alone (NH)	9	19	23	42	83	0.06%	0.11%	0.12%	0.21%	0.45%
Native Hawaiian or Pacific Islander alone (NH)	x	x	2	4	4	x	x	0.01%	0.02%	0.02%
Other race alone (NH)	1	0	1	4	35	0.01%	0.00%	0.01%	0.02%	0.19%
Mixed race or Multiracial (NH)	x	x	93	129	349	x	x	0.48%	0.66%	1.90%
Hispanic or Latino (any race)	114	49	155	369	418	0.72%	0.30%	0.80%	1.89%	2.28%
Total	15,927	16,527	19,407	19,568	18,340	100.00%	100.00%	100.00%	100.00%	100.00%

=== 2020 census ===
As of the 2020 census, the county had a population of 18,340. The median age was 41.3 years. 23.0% of residents were under the age of 18 and 18.9% of residents were 65 years of age or older. For every 100 females there were 93.7 males, and for every 100 females age 18 and over there were 90.4 males age 18 and over.

The racial makeup of the county was 60.6% White, 35.0% Black or African American, 0.2% American Indian and Alaska Native, 0.5% Asian, <0.1% Native Hawaiian and Pacific Islander, 1.4% from some other race, and 2.4% from two or more races. Hispanic or Latino residents of any race comprised 2.3% of the population.

<0.1% of residents lived in urban areas, while 100.0% lived in rural areas.

There were 7,294 households in the county, of which 30.2% had children under the age of 18 living in them. Of all households, 43.7% were married-couple households, 19.5% were households with a male householder and no spouse or partner present, and 32.0% were households with a female householder and no spouse or partner present. About 28.9% of all households were made up of individuals and 12.2% had someone living alone who was 65 years of age or older.

There were 8,290 housing units, of which 12.0% were vacant. Among occupied housing units, 80.3% were owner-occupied and 19.7% were renter-occupied. The homeowner vacancy rate was 1.1% and the rental vacancy rate was 7.9%.

== Education ==
The Covington County School District, the only school district in the county, maintains a total of nine schools, plus an alternative school and a Vocational Education center.

The county is in the zone for Jones College.

== Politics ==
United States presidential election results for Covington County, Mississippi
Year	Republican		Democratic		Third party(ies)	
Year	No.	%	No.	%	No.	%
1912	8	1.17%	570	83.33%	106	15.50%
1916	63	6.49%	836	86.19%	71	7.32%
1920	257	27.49%	649	69.41%	29	3.10%
1924	48	4.98%	822	85.36%	93	9.66%
1928	189	14.32%	1,131	85.68%	0	0.00%
1932	22	1.59%	1,352	97.97%	6	0.43%
1936	52	3.16%	1,589	96.65%	3	0.18%
1940	52	3.54%	1,419	96.46%	0	0.00%
1944	58	3.35%	1,672	96.65%	0	0.00%
1948	16	0.95%	135	8.00%	1,536	91.05%
1952	770	33.41%	1,535	66.59%	0	0.00%
1956	386	18.82%	1,382	67.38%	283	13.80%
1960	371	16.88%	842	38.31%	985	44.81%
1964	3,033	88.55%	392	11.45%	0	0.00%
1968	445	9.26%	691	14.38%	3,668	76.35%
1972	3,842	84.09%	642	14.05%	85	1.86%
1976	2,591	46.53%	2,862	51.40%	115	2.07%
1980	3,471	53.15%	2,956	45.26%	104	1.59%
1984	4,165	64.95%	2,219	34.60%	29	0.45%
1988	4,005	60.38%	2,591	39.06%	37	0.56%
1992	3,525	50.39%	2,775	39.67%	696	9.95%
1996	3,219	51.05%	2,628	41.68%	458	7.26%
2000	4,180	60.75%	2,623	38.12%	78	1.13%
2004	5,044	61.12%	3,158	38.27%	50	0.61%
2008	5,523	58.38%	3,852	40.71%	86	0.91%
2012	5,405	57.82%	3,878	41.48%	65	0.70%
2016	5,435	61.68%	3,276	37.18%	100	1.13%
2020	5,854	62.54%	3,416	36.50%	90	0.96%
2024	5,869	66.23%	2,921	32.96%	71	0.80%

=== National politics ===
On the presidential level, Covington County is solidly Republican and has been for more than two decades. A Democratic presidential candidate has not won Covington County since 1976, when native Southerner Jimmy Carter bested Gerald Ford by fewer than 300 votes. In the United States House of Representatives, Covington County falls within the boundaries of Mississippi's 3rd congressional district, which is represented by Republican Michael Guest. Guest received 73% of the vote in the county when running for re-election in 2022.

=== State politics ===
On the state level, Covington County is solidly Republican. Not since 1995 has Covington County voted for the Democratic gubernatorial nominee. In the 2011 election, Covington County voters elected the Republican nominee in seven of the eight statewide contests. In the Mississippi House of Representatives, the majority of Covington County is represented by Joseph L. "Joe" Warren, one of the longest-serving Democrats in the Mississippi House. Representing smaller portions of Covington County are Blaine Eaton and Bob Evans, both Democrats. In the State Senate, the county is represented by Joey Fillingane, a Republican.

=== Local politics ===
On the local level, Covington County is still heavily Democratic. Of the six county-wide elected positions, all are held by Democrats. This is also the case for the five-member Board of Supervisors.

== Visitor attractions ==
=== Okatoma River ===
The Okatoma River, also called Okatoma Creek, carves a winding path north to south through Covington County, running through three towns and eventually emptying into the Bouie River just south of the county line.

People from all over the Southeast travel to the county to canoe and kayak a portion of the river, from Seminary to Sanford. Okatoma Outdoor Post and Seminary Canoe Rental both provide canoe and kayak rentals, as well as lodging on the river. The Okatoma has consistently been ranked among the best rafting sites in the South.

=== Mitchell Farms ===
Located just east of Collins, Mitchell Farms is one of the top agri-tourism destinations in south Mississippi. Families and school groups alike travel to Collins each year to tour the farm and enjoy the pumpkin patch, rustic cabins and farm buildings, corn maze, sunflower field, and other family-oriented features.

Mississippi's Peanut Festival — complete with a harvest king and queen competition, 5K run/walk, food vendors, and children's activities — is held annually in October, attracting several thousand.

=== Grand Paradise Water Park ===
Collins' Grand Paradise is a seven-acre water park, one of the largest in Mississippi. Attractions include the Lazy River, Cannon Bowl, Pipeline, and more. Food concessions, lockers, a changing area, and a gift shop are available.

== Communities ==
=== Cities ===
- Collins (county seat)

=== Towns ===
- Mount Olive
- Seminary

=== Unincorporated communities ===
- Hopewell
- Hot Coffee
- Lux
- Ora
- Sanford
- Williamsburg

== See also ==
- National Register of Historic Places listings in Covington County, Mississippi

== Notable people ==
- Dana Andrews, actor and former president of the Screen Actors Guild (born on a farmstead outside Collins, but raised in Texas)
- Ernest Duff (1931-2016), businessman, lawyer and Mormon bishop
- Steve McNair, former NFL quarterback
- Martin Sennett Conner, Governor of Mississippi, 1932–36
- Gerald McRaney, actor
- Dale Houston, singer
