= Mount Olive High School (Mississippi) =

High school in Mississippi, United States

Mount Olive Attendance Center
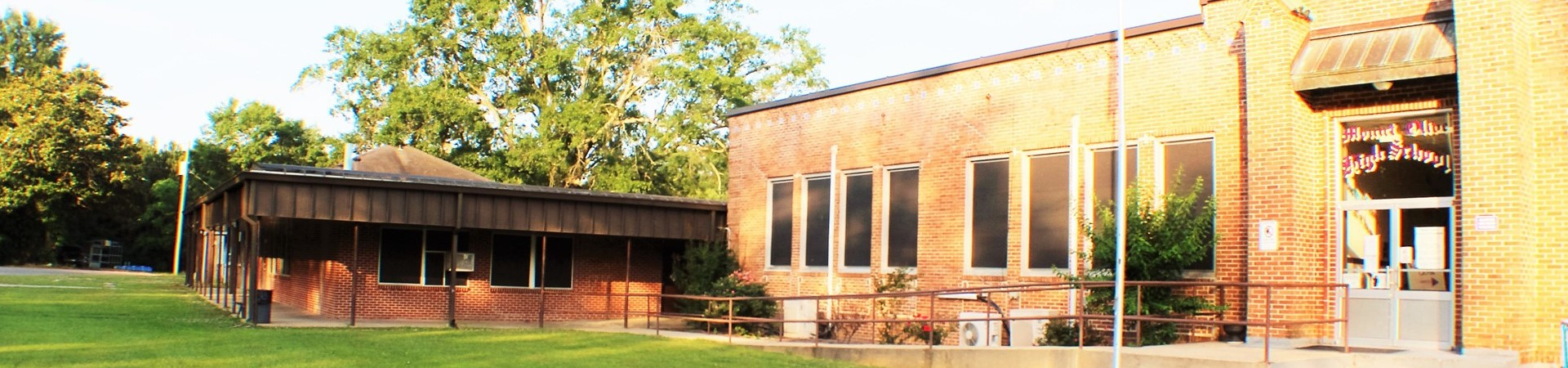
- Attendance center

Location
- 301 South 4th Street; Mount Olive, (Covington County), Mississippi 39119; United States
- 31.7593°N 89.6575°W

Information
- Type: Public high school
- School district: Covington County School District
- Principal: Otonya Gray Walker
- Staff: 33.38 (on an FTE basis)
- Enrollment: 327 (2023-2024)
- Student to teacher ratio: 9.80
- Colors: Purple, gold and white
- Mascot: Pirates
- Website: mohs.covingtoncountyschools.org

Mount Olive High School is a high school in Mount Olive, Mississippi. It is a part of the Covington County School District. The principal is Otonya Gray Walker.

== Notable alumni ==
- Steve McNair, NFL quarterback
