= Staige D. Blackford =

American editor

Staige Davis Blackford Jr. (1931–2003) was an American journalist who subsequently edited the Virginia Quarterly Review (VQR) for nearly three decades. He worked to end racial segregation and to promote racial harmony, particularly in his native Virginia.

== Early and family life ==
Born on January 3, 1931, in Charlottesville, Virginia, to Dr. Staige Davis Blackford Sr. (1898–1949) and Lydia Fishburne Blackford, Staige Blackford Jr. was raised in the University of Virginia (UVA) community. His father, a UVA graduate who had served in the U.S. Army Ambulance Service in World War I and who later directed an evacuation hospital during World War II, taught at the University of Virginia's medical school for many years until his unexpected death in 1949. The elder Blackford's overseas experiences, in conjunction with his medical education in the American North, likely augmented his son's racial sensitivity. Soon after returning home from military service in 1945, Dr. Blackford pointed out to his son that only southern blacks did not receive the respect granted to other Americans.

Blackford attended Virginia's elite Episcopal High School, although he failed to finish a required trigonometry course and thus did not graduate, and then the University of Virginia. He participated in the Experiment in International Living in Madrid, living with a former Republican who had fought against Francisco Franco in the Spanish Civil War and who been imprisoned by the Franco regime for a decade. This experience fostered the young man's lifelong identification with underdogs.

Blackford, who was named a Rhodes Scholar in 1948, was regarded by many of his professors as one of the university's top students, edited the student newspaper, The Cavalier Daily. He courageously began speaking out against segregation immediately after his assumption of the paper's leadership in 1952. “We would have no objection ourselves to being in a class with a Negro,” he declared. “We do not believe a man’s intellectual ability is determined by the color of his skin. We do not believe an ‘aristocracy of intellect’ is composed solely of one race. We believe the essence of a democratic educational system to consist in allowing equal, unseparated opportunities for all men regardless of their ‘race, color, or creed.'"

In 1958, he married Bettina Balding (1935–2014) of New York and Kentucky.

== Career ==
During his Oxford University experience, Blackford learned how students considered the South "backward and benighted." He was recruited by the Central Intelligence Agency and became an officer in the United States Air Force. He noticed the relative lack of prejudice in the military, particularly after President Harry S Truman's desegregation order. Upon hearing of the divisions within Virginia during the Massive Resistance crisis, Blackford ended his government service and resumed his journalistic career.

Blackford wrote for Time and worked as an editor for Louisiana State University Press. He also became research director for the Southern Regional Council. In 1964, Blackford relocated to Norfolk, where he took a post as chief political reporter for the Virginian-Pilot, which had earned a reputation as the state's most racially progressive white newspaper.

There he met A. Linwood Holton, a future Virginia governor for whom Blackford would become press secretary from 1970 to 1974. Blackford played a prominent role in guiding the Commonwealth into a more progressive racial era. At his behest, Holton signaled a clear break with the past in his 1970 inaugural address: “As Virginia has been a model for so much else in America in the past, let us now endeavor to make today’s Virginia a model in race relations. Let us, as Lincoln said, insist on an open society ‘with malice toward none; charity for all.'"

In 1975, Blackford returned to Charlottesville and became editor of the Virginia Quarterly Review (VQR).

== Death and legacy ==
Blackford died in a car accident a week before his scheduled retirement. The funeral was held at St. Paul's Memorial Church in Charlottesville, where the family had long been active worshipers. He is buried (as is his father) at the University of Virginia's cemetery, where his wife was also later interred.
