= Collins, Mississippi =

- City
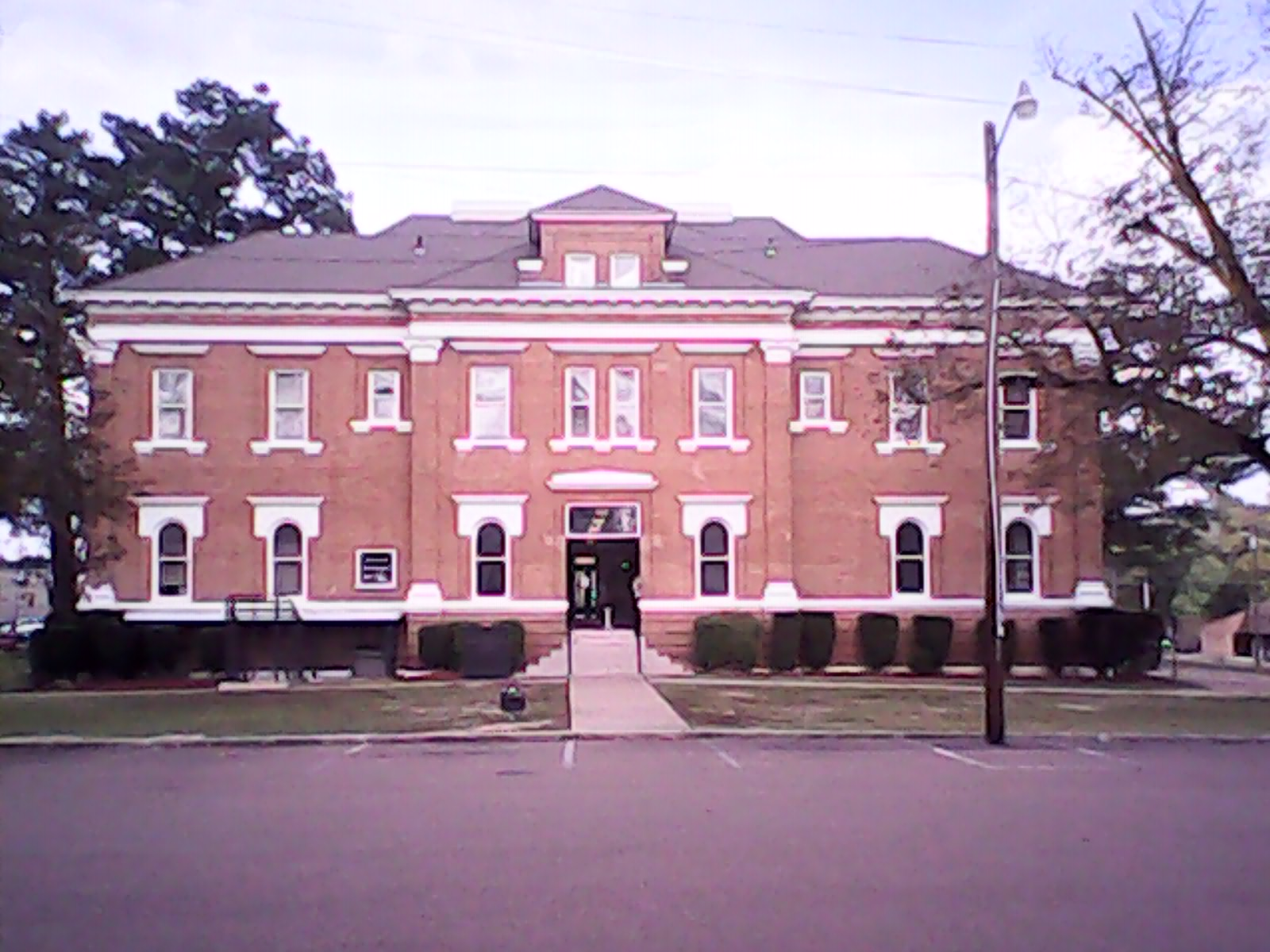
- Covington County Courthouse in Collins

- Flag Seal
- Motto: Come Grow With Us!
- Location of Collins, Mississippi

- Location in the United States
- Coordinates: 31°38′32″N 89°33′34″W
- Country: United States
- State: Mississippi
- County: Covington
- Settled: Late 1800s
- Incorporated: November 24, 1906
- Named for: Fred W. Collins

Government
  - Type: Mayor–council
  - Mayor: Hope Magee Jones
  - City clerk: Suzette Davis
  - Deputy clerk: Carrie Underwood
  - Alderman at-large and mayor pro tem: Bobby A. Mooney

Area
  - Total: 7.99 sq mi (20.69 km^{2})
  - Land: 7.96 sq mi (20.62 km^{2})
  - Water: 0.031 sq mi (0.08 km^{2})
- Elevation: 292 ft (89 m)

Population (2020)
  - Total: 2,342
  - Density: 294.2/sq mi (113.59/km^{2})
- Time zone: UTC−6 (Central (CST))
  - Summer (DST): UTC−5 (CDT)
- ZIP Code: 39428
- Area code: 601
- FIPS code: 28-15140
- GNIS feature ID: 0668700
- Website: cityofcollins.com

Collins is a city in Covington County, Mississippi, United States. As of the 2020 census, Collins had a population of 2,342. It is the county seat of Covington County.

== History ==
=== From Williamsburg Depot to Collins ===
Collins was originally incorporated as Williamsburg Depot in 1899. The Gulf and Ship Island Railroad had completed construction, and bypassed Williamsburg, the county seat at that time. The sawmills moved to the new town of Williamsburg Depot in order to be closer to the railroad. As lumber was an important industry during the time, the town moved with them. Not long after, Williamsburg Depot grew to a town of 6,000 - 7,000 people.

Eventually, the difficulties of having such a long town name, Williamsburg Depot, became clear. The length caused many people to write it over their stamps, voiding the postage. In order to correct this issue, the postmaster asked to have the town name changed in 1905, and the postal service came up with a short and easy name "Bad". For reasons that may be clear, the residents rejected this name, and eventually came up with Collins, in honor of Fred W. Collins, leader of the state's Republican party and U. S. Marshal for the Southern District of Mississippi. The town's name was officially changed on November 24, 1906.

=== Becoming the county seat ===
In 1906, a portion of the west side of Covington County became Jefferson Davis County. As a result, Williamsburg lost its position at the center of the county, and a new county seat was needed. Collins eventually emerged over Seminary and Ora, Mississippi, and a new county courthouse was built. The first court place was held in 1908.

=== Decline and resurgence ===
Eventually, the lumber industry in Collins exhausted the timber resources and moved. The town population dwindled from 7,000 to 700. However, industry began to return to the town in 1936 when U.S. 49 and U.S. 84 were built, putting the town at the crossroads of these two major highways. In addition, the Plantation Pipeline was run from Baton Rouge to the east coast. It passed through the community of Kola, which was soon annexed by Collins.

=== Hurricane Katrina and Duryea Adopt-A-Town ===
In September 2005, Hurricane Katrina struck Collins. As most aid agencies were concentrating on major metropolitan areas such as New Orleans, small towns like Collins were seemingly overlooked. Duryea, Pennsylvania, which had experienced similar flooding as the result of Hurricane Agnes in 1972, sought a town similar in size and demographics to "adopt" and help rebuild after the devastation wrought by the largest natural disaster in the history of the town. By hosting a bazaar and through other various fundraising efforts, Duryea helped rebuild. Collins Mayor V.O. Smith and his wife, Ada, flew to Duryea to thank their mayor Keith Moss, organizer Trina Moss and the townspeople of Duryea. This led to a bond between the two towns and has included several visits to both towns.

== Geography ==
Collins is located near the center of Covington County, along the southwest side of Okatoma Creek, a tributary of the Bowie River and part of the Pascagoula River watershed.

According to the United States Census Bureau, Collins has a total area of 8.0 square miles (20.7 km^{2}), of which 8.0 square miles (20.6 km^{2}) is land and 0.04 square miles (0.1 km^{2}), or 0.37%, is water.

Climate data for Collins, Mississippi (1981-2015)
Month	Jan	Feb	Mar	Apr	May	Jun	Jul	Aug	Sep	Oct	Nov	Dec	Year
Mean daily maximum °F (°C)	57.8 (14.3)	62.0 (16.7)	69.1 (20.6)	75.7 (24.3)	82.3 (27.9)	88.0 (31.1)	90.3 (32.4)	90.2 (32.3)	85.5 (29.7)	76.7 (24.8)	68.3 (20.2)	59.6 (15.3)	75.5 (24.1)
Daily mean °F (°C)	46.2 (7.9)	50.1 (10.1)	57.0 (13.9)	64.2 (17.9)	71.8 (22.1)	78.1 (25.6)	80.7 (27.1)	80.4 (26.9)	75.1 (23.9)	65.0 (18.3)	56.5 (13.6)	48.4 (9.1)	64.5 (18.0)
Mean daily minimum °F (°C)	34.6 (1.4)	38.2 (3.4)	45.0 (7.2)	52.6 (11.4)	61.3 (16.3)	68.3 (20.2)	71.1 (21.7)	70.6 (21.4)	64.7 (18.2)	53.3 (11.8)	44.8 (7.1)	37.1 (2.8)	53.5 (11.9)
Average precipitation inches (mm)	5.69 (145)	5.50 (140)	5.84 (148)	4.84 (123)	5.10 (130)	4.49 (114)	4.83 (123)	4.61 (117)	3.90 (99)	3.86 (98)	5.05 (128)	5.25 (133)	58.96 (1,498)
Average snowfall inches (cm)	0.0 (0.0)	0.0 (0.0)	0.1 (0.25)	0.0 (0.0)	0.0 (0.0)	0.0 (0.0)	0.0 (0.0)	0.0 (0.0)	0.0 (0.0)	0.0 (0.0)	0.0 (0.0)	0.1 (0.25)	0.2 (0.5)
Source: National Weather Forecast Office

== Demographics ==
Historical population
Census	Pop.	Note	%±
1910	2,581		—
1920	1,389		−46.2%
1930	935		−32.7%
1940	1,100		17.6%
1950	1,293		17.5%
1960	1,537		18.9%
1970	1,934		25.8%
1980	2,131		10.2%
1990	2,541		19.2%
2000	2,683		5.6%
2010	2,586		−3.6%
2020	2,342		−9.4%
U.S. Decennial Census

=== Racial and ethnic composition ===
Collins city, Mississippi – Racial and ethnic composition Note: the US Census treats Hispanic/Latino as an ethnic category. This table excludes Latinos from the racial categories and assigns them to a separate category. Hispanics/Latinos may be of any race.
Race / Ethnicity (NH = Non-Hispanic)	Pop 2000	Pop 2010	Pop 2020	% 2000	% 2010	% 2020
White alone (NH)	1,238	1,130	939	46.14%	43.70%	40.09%
Black or African American alone (NH)	1,392	1,316	1,225	51.88%	50.89%	52.31%
Native American or Alaska Native alone (NH)	2	3	0	0.07%	0.12%	0.00%
Asian alone (NH)	2	8	11	0.07%	0.31%	0.47%
Native Hawaiian or Pacific Islander alone (NH)	0	0	2	0.00%	0.00%	0.09%
Other race alone (NH)	0	2	2	0.00%	0.08%	0.09%
Mixed race or Multiracial (NH)	6	18	55	0.22%	0.70%	2.35%
Hispanic or Latino (any race)	43	109	108	1.60%	4.22%	4.61%
Total	2,683	2,586	2,342	100.00%	100.00%	100.00%

=== 2020 census ===
As of the 2020 census, Collins had a population of 2,342. The median age was 43.8 years. 22.8% of residents were under the age of 18 and 25.5% of residents were 65 years of age or older. For every 100 females there were 88.0 males, and for every 100 females age 18 and over there were 85.2 males age 18 and over.

0.0% of residents lived in urban areas, while 100.0% lived in rural areas.

There were 854 households in Collins, of which 33.3% had children under the age of 18 living in them. Of all households, 27.6% were married-couple households, 20.5% were households with a male householder and no spouse or partner present, and 47.5% were households with a female householder and no spouse or partner present. About 33.4% of all households were made up of individuals and 15.0% had someone living alone who was 65 years of age or older. There were 661 families residing in the city.

There were 960 housing units, of which 11.0% were vacant. The homeowner vacancy rate was 1.7% and the rental vacancy rate was 7.0%.

== Arts and culture ==
=== Annual cultural events ===
==== Okatoma Festival ====
Named after the Okatoma Creek, which flows through the county, the Okatoma Festival is held the first Saturday in May. It is held in downtown Collins, and features carnival rides, vendor booths, and local cuisine. In addition, there is a 5K run held in the morning.

==== Mitchell Farms Pumpkin Patch ====
On Saturdays and Sundays, from the middle of September to the beginning of November, Mitchell Farms hosts the Mitchell Farms Pumpkin Patch & Maze. The event consists of many attractions, such as wagon rides, corn maze, animal barn, and a goat castle.

==== Christmas in the Park ====
From the day after Thanksgiving to the day after Christmas, the Chamber of Commerce hosts "Christmas in the Park". This is a massive, drive through light display that takes up the entirety of Bettie D. Robertson Memorial Park. All items in the display are donations from local individuals. It features secular and religious aspects of the holiday.

The city has recently come under scrutiny as a result of this display. On October 19, 2015, the Freedom from Religion Foundation sent a letter to the City of Collins, on behalf of a local citizen, asking for displays of a religious nature to be removed from the Bettie D. Robertson City Park. The letter stated that, among other things, permanent displays of 3 Latin crosses, a statue of Jesus carrying a cross, and a globe with City of Collins displayed above Matthew 8:12 "I am the Light of the World" are unconstitutional and "tremendously un-welcoming to non-Christians". It asks for immediate removal of the displays from Bettie D. Robertson Park. The letter was met with great hostility from the citizens, with some calling for the complainant to leave the county.

=== Tourism ===
The city features Grand Paradise Water Park. In addition, Mitchell Farms offers tours of the original farm buildings and event planning services, in addition to seasonal fruits and vegetables. Okatoma Golf club provides an 18-hole course in Oak Hills Subdivision.

== Parks and recreation ==
There are two major parks in the city of Collins: Bettie D. Robertson and Westside Park. Robertson Park is home to Christmas in the Park, and features athletic fields, a walking track and playground. There is also a duck pond and bird sanctuary. Westside Park features basketball courts and a playground as well.

== Education ==
The city of Collins is served Covington County School District. There are three schools within Collins:

- Collins Elementary (K-4)
- Carver Middle School (5-8)
- Collins High School (9-12)

The school district also has a Vocational Center located in Collins, that encompasses, but is not limited to, programs of study such as Health Sciences, Construction Trades, Teacher Academy, and Business & Marketing.

The county is in the zone for Jones College.

== Media ==
The city is served by the News-Commercial, a local paper based out of Collins. The paper publishes every Wednesday. The Clarion-Ledger, a regional paper based in Jackson, is available as well.

Both WDAM and WHLT provide the city with local over-the-air television service. The former is based out of Laurel, MS, while the latter is based out of Hattiesburg, MS. There is not a local cable station located within the city.

== Infrastructure ==
=== Transportation ===
The city of Collins lies near the intersection of two major highways, U.S. Routes 49 and 84. U.S. 49 passes through the city southwest of the downtown; it leads 63 miles (101 km) northwest to Jackson, the state capital, and 28 miles (45 km) southeast to Hattiesburg. U.S. 84 bypasses the center of the city, crossing U.S. 49 at an interchange in the northern part of the city, and leads east 27 miles (43 km) to Laurel and west 55 miles (89 km) to the vicinity of Brookhaven.

There is not a mass transit system in place in the city of Collins; as a result, many residents drive cars in their daily lives. However, there are sidewalks in many of the subdivisions around the city that link with the city center.

=== Utilities ===
The city is served by Southern Pines Electric Power Association, out of Taylorsville.

=== Healthcare ===
The city is served by Covington County Hospital, a 25-bed critical access hospital that opened in 1951. The hospital is active in the community, funding local educational extra-curricular activities and after school programs.

== Notable people ==
- Dana Andrews, film legend born on a farmstead near Collins, raised in Huntsville, Texas
- L. Venchael Booth, Baptist minister
- Correll Buckhalter, former NFL running back
- Demario Davis, NFL linebacker
- Billy Hamilton, professional baseball player (Kansas City Royals)
- Dale Houston, singer
- Mack A. Jordan, United States Army soldier during the Korean War who was posthumously awarded the Medal of Honor
- Randolph Keys, NBA player
- Brandon McDonald, former NFL cornerback
- Gerald McRaney, actor
- Marilyn Mims, soprano with the Metropolitan Opera
