= Steve McNair =

American football player (1973–2009)

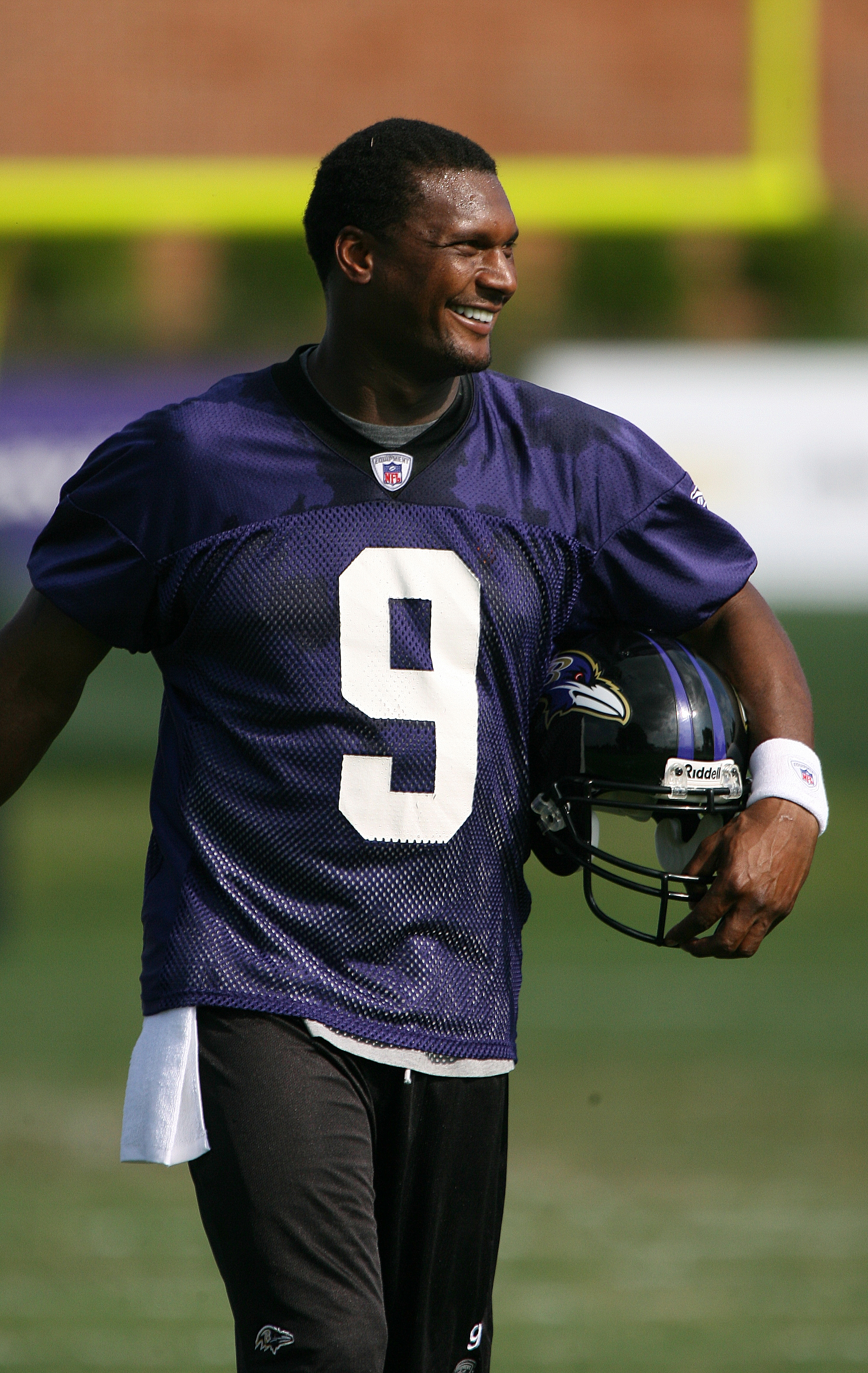
- McNair with the Baltimore Ravens in 2007

No. 9
- Position: Quarterback

Personal information
- Born: February 14, 1973; Mount Olive, Mississippi, U.S.
- Died: July 4, 2009 (aged 36); Nashville, Tennessee, U.S.
- Listed height: 6 ft 2 in (1.88 m)
- Listed weight: 230 lb (104 kg)

Career information
- High school: Mount Olive
- College: Alcorn State (1991–1994)
- NFL draft: 1995: 1st round, 3rd overall pick

Career history
- Houston / Tennessee Oilers / Titans (1995–2005); Baltimore Ravens (2006–2007)

Awards and highlights
- NFL Most Valuable Player (2003) (Note: Co-winner with Peyton Manning); Second-team All-Pro (2003); 3× Pro Bowl (2000, 2003, 2005); NFL passer rating leader (2003); Titans/Oilers Ring of Honor; Tennessee Titans No. 9 retired; Walter Payton Award (1994); 4× SWAC Offensive Player of the Year (1991–1994)

Career NFL statistics
- Passing attempts: 4,544
- Passing completions: 2,733
- Completion percentage: 60.1%
- TD–INT: 174–119
- Passing yards: 31,304
- Passer rating: 82.8
- Rushing yards: 3,590
- Rushing touchdowns: 38
- Stats at Pro Football Reference
- College Football Hall of Fame

Stephen LaTreal McNair (February 14, 1973 – July 4, 2009), was an American professional football quarterback who played in the National Football League (NFL) for 13 seasons. Nicknamed "Air", he spent the majority of his career with the Tennessee Titans franchise. He was the first African American quarterback to win NFL MVP and one of only four to receive the award.

McNair played college football for the Alcorn State Braves, winning the Walter Payton Award in 1994. He was selected third overall in the 1995 NFL draft by the Houston Oilers a year before their relocation to Tennessee and became the starter by his third season. In 1999, McNair led the newly rebranded Titans to their first playoff appearance and win since 1993 en route to the franchise's Super Bowl debut in Super Bowl XXXIV. McNair went on to led the Titans to a total of four postseason runs, two division titles, and two AFC Championship Game appearances. He was named MVP in 2003 alongside Peyton Manning after leading the league in passer rating, in addition to receiving three Pro Bowl selections and one second-team All-Pro honor. Following 11 seasons with the Titans franchise, he was a member of the Baltimore Ravens in his last two years, helping the team clinch a division title in 2006.

Two years after his retirement, McNair was shot and killed in 2009 by his mistress in a murder–suicide. He was posthumously inducted to the College Football Hall of Fame in 2020.

== Early life ==
McNair was born in a small tin-roofed house in Mount Olive, Mississippi, on February 14, 1973. He had four brothers, Fred, Jason, Michael, and Tim. McNair began attending Mount Olive High School in the fall of 1987, where he played football, baseball, and basketball in addition to running track. As a junior in 1989, McNair led the Mount Olive Pirates to the state championship. He also played free safety in high school, and in 1990 alone, McNair intercepted 15 passes, raising his career total to 30, which tied the mark established by Terrell Buckley at Pascagoula High School. An All-State selection (offense), McNair was named an All-American by Super Prep magazine (defense).

The Seattle Mariners drafted McNair in the 35th round of the 1991 MLB amateur draft.

== College career ==
McNair was initially offered a full scholarship to the University of Florida to play running back, but wanting to play quarterback, he chose Alcorn State University, a Historically Black University that competes in the NCAA's Division I-AA (now known as the Football Championship Subdivision) Southwestern Athletic Conference (SWAC). In 1992, McNair threw 3,541 yards and 29 touchdowns, and ran in for 10 more scores. The Braves fashioned a record of 7–4, including a last-second victory in their rematch with Grambling. In that game, McNair returned from an injury and helped Alcorn State, trailing late in the final period, move deep into Tigers' territory. Then, despite a leg injury, he tucked the ball under his arm and dove into the end zone for the winning touchdown. The victory over Grambling helped the Braves qualify for the I-AA playoffs where they faced off against then-Northeast Louisiana, falling 78–27 to the Indians on November 21, 1992. McNair helped Alcorn State to another good year in 1993, as the Braves upped their record to 8–3 while he threw for more than 3,000 yards and 30 touchdowns. McNair was also named First-Team All-SWAC for the third year in a row.

As a senior, McNair gained 6,281 combined yards rushing (904) and passing (5,377), along with 56 touchdowns. His total offense averages were 571 y/g over 11 games, the all-divisions collegiate per game record. In the process, McNair surpassed more than a dozen records and was named an All-American. He also won the Walter Payton Award as the top I-AA player and finished third in the Heisman Trophy voting behind Rashaan Salaam and Ki-Jana Carter. McNair set career records for the Football Championship Series with 15,010 passing yards, as well as the division record for total offensive yards with 17,305 career yards. His record for career passing, total offensive yards, and total number of plays still stand, but his marks for career passing completions and attempts were eclipsed by Samford quarterback Devlin Hodges in 2018.

McNair was a member of the fraternity Omega Psi Phi, highlighting his allegiance by tattooing "Omega Man" on his arm.

== Professional career ==
Pre-draft measurables
| Height | Weight | Arm length | Hand span | 40-yard dash | Broad jump |
|---|---|---|---|---|---|
| 6 ft 1 5/8 in (1.87 m) | 224 lb (102 kg) | 32 1/4 in (0.82 m) | 10 1/2 in (0.27 m) | 4.65 s | 9 ft 7 in (2.92 m) |
All values from NFL Combine/pre-draft

=== Houston / Tennessee Oilers / Titans ===
==== 1995–1996 ====
With the third overall pick in the 1995 NFL draft, the Houston Oilers and new head coach Jeff Fisher selected McNair in hopes of replacing former starter Warren Moon, making him at the time the highest-drafted African-American quarterback in NFL history and signing him to a seven-year contract. McNair did not see his first action until the last two series of the fourth quarter in a November game against the Cleveland Browns. Late in the season, McNair also appeared briefly against the Detroit Lions and New York Jets. In 1996, McNair remained a backup to Chris Chandler until starting a game in Week 15 against the Jacksonville Jaguars.

==== 1997 season ====
McNair's first season as the Oilers' starter in 1997 (the team's first year in Tennessee) resulted in an 8–8 record for the team, which played its home games at the Liberty Bowl in Memphis, Tennessee. McNair's 2,665 passing yards were the most for the Oilers in a season since Warren Moon in 1993, and his 13 interceptions were the fewest for a single season in franchise history. McNair also led the team in rushing touchdowns with eight and ranked second behind running back Eddie George with 674 yards on the ground, at the time the third-highest total for a quarterback in NFL history.

==== 1998 season ====
In 1998, McNair set career passing highs with 492 attempts, 289 completions, 3,228 yards, and 15 touchdowns for the Oilers, now playing in Nashville. He also cut his interceptions to 10, helping his quarterback rating climb to 80.1.

==== 1999 season: Super Bowl season ====
The team officially changed its name from Oilers to Titans for the 1999 season as they debuted a new stadium, Adelphia Coliseum. Early in the season, McNair was diagnosed with an inflamed disk following a narrow 36–35 victory over the Cincinnati Bengals, and needed surgery. In his stead entered Neil O'Donnell, a veteran who had guided the Pittsburgh Steelers to the Super Bowl four years earlier. Over the next five games, O'Donnell led the Titans to a 4–1 record. McNair returned against the St. Louis Rams, and with McNair starting, Tennessee won seven of its last nine games, good for a 13–3 record and second place in the AFC Central.

The Titans opened the playoffs at home against the Buffalo Bills in a Wild Card game, winning on the "Music City Miracle" and eventually advancing to Super Bowl XXXIV in a postseason rematch with the Rams. On the penultimate play of the game with the Titans facing 3rd-and-5 to go, McNair was hit by two Rams defenders, but he somehow got away and completed a 16-yard pass to Kevin Dyson to gain a first down at the Rams' 10-yard line. On the final play of the game, McNair's pass to Dyson was complete, but Dyson was unable to break the plane of the goal line, giving the Rams a 23–16 victory. In his only Super Bowl appearance, McNair threw 22-of-36 for 214 yards while rushing eight times for 64 yards. McNair signed a new six-year contract after the 1999 season worth US$47 million.

==== 2000–2001 ====
McNair played in all 16 games in 2000 but did not start the first of two annual games against the Steelers because of a sternum injury incurred in a 17–14 victory over the Kansas City Chiefs the previous game. Following the Titans’ bye week, Neil O'Donnell started against his former team, but after O'Donnell threw three interceptions, McNair came in and threw a touchdown to Erron Kinney; a missed Steelers field goal attempt resulted in the Titans winning 23–20.

Following a 13–3 season in 2000 which ended in a playoff loss to the Baltimore Ravens, McNair put together his most productive year as a pro in 2001. In 2001, McNair registered career passing highs in yards (3,350), completions (264), touchdowns (21), and quarterback rating (90.2). He was also the team's most effective rusher, tying George for the club lead with five scores. Named to the Pro Bowl for the first time, McNair sat out the game due to a shoulder injury.

==== 2002 season ====
In 2002, the Titans finished the regular season 11–5 and reached the playoffs. In the Divisional Round against the Pittsburgh Steelers, McNair threw for a career postseason high 338 yards, two touchdowns, and two interceptions, while rushing for 29 yards and another score on the ground. The game had a controversial finish when, after missing a game-winning field goal at the end of regulation time and a second failed kick in overtime was negated because of a controversial running-into-the-kicker penalty on Pittsburgh's Dewayne Washington, kicker Joe Nedney won the game from 26 yards out 2:15 into overtime. Steelers coach Bill Cowher said that he called a timeout before the winning kick took place. McNair and the Titans reached the AFC Championship Game, but lost to the Oakland Raiders 41–24.

Between the 2002 and 2003 seasons, McNair was arrested for DUI and illegal gun possession in May 2003. His blood alcohol was above 0.10, and a 9-mm handgun was sitting in the front of the car. All charges related to the incident were later dropped.

==== 2003 season: MVP season ====
In December of the 2003 season, an injured calf and ankle kept McNair sidelined for two games, though he still finished with the best numbers of his career, including 3,215 passing yards, 24 touchdown passes, just seven interceptions, and a quarterback rating of 100.4. The Titans finished 12–4, the same record as the Colts, but Indianapolis took the AFC South division championship by virtue of its two victories over Tennessee. McNair and Colts quarterback Peyton Manning were named co-NFL MVPs following the 2003 season, which ended for the Titans in a playoff loss to the eventual Super Bowl champion New England Patriots in the Divisional Round. McNair finished the 2003 season as the league leader in passer rating and became the youngest player in NFL history to pass for 20,000 yards and run for 3,000 yards.

==== 2004–2005 ====
McNair missed the 2004 season's fourth game with a bruised sternum, an injury suffered the previous week against Jacksonville, and played in only five more games that season. In 2005, he played in 14 games because of a back injury.

This series of season-ending injuries prompted the Titans to make the business decision of locking McNair out of team headquarters in the 2006 offseason. The team would not let him rehab in its building because it feared an injury would force the franchise to pay him $23.46 million (his contract had been restructured so often that his salary cap reached a hard-to-manage amount). The Players Association's filed a grievance on his behalf in which an arbitrator ruled that the team violated its contract, opening the possibility for a trade.

=== Baltimore Ravens ===
On April 30, 2006, the Titans allowed McNair and his agent, James "Bus" Cook, to speak with the Baltimore Ravens to try to work out a deal. By May 2006, the Baltimore Sun reported that the Ravens were interested in McNair. Speculation was that the Titans might hold onto McNair until the week before training camp in late July if the Ravens didn't come up with a satisfactory trade offer for McNair according to a league source. However, on June 7, the two teams worked out a deal to send McNair to the Ravens for a fourth-round pick in the 2007 NFL draft. The next day, McNair flew to Baltimore, passed a physical, and was announced as the newest member of the Ravens.

==== 2006 season ====
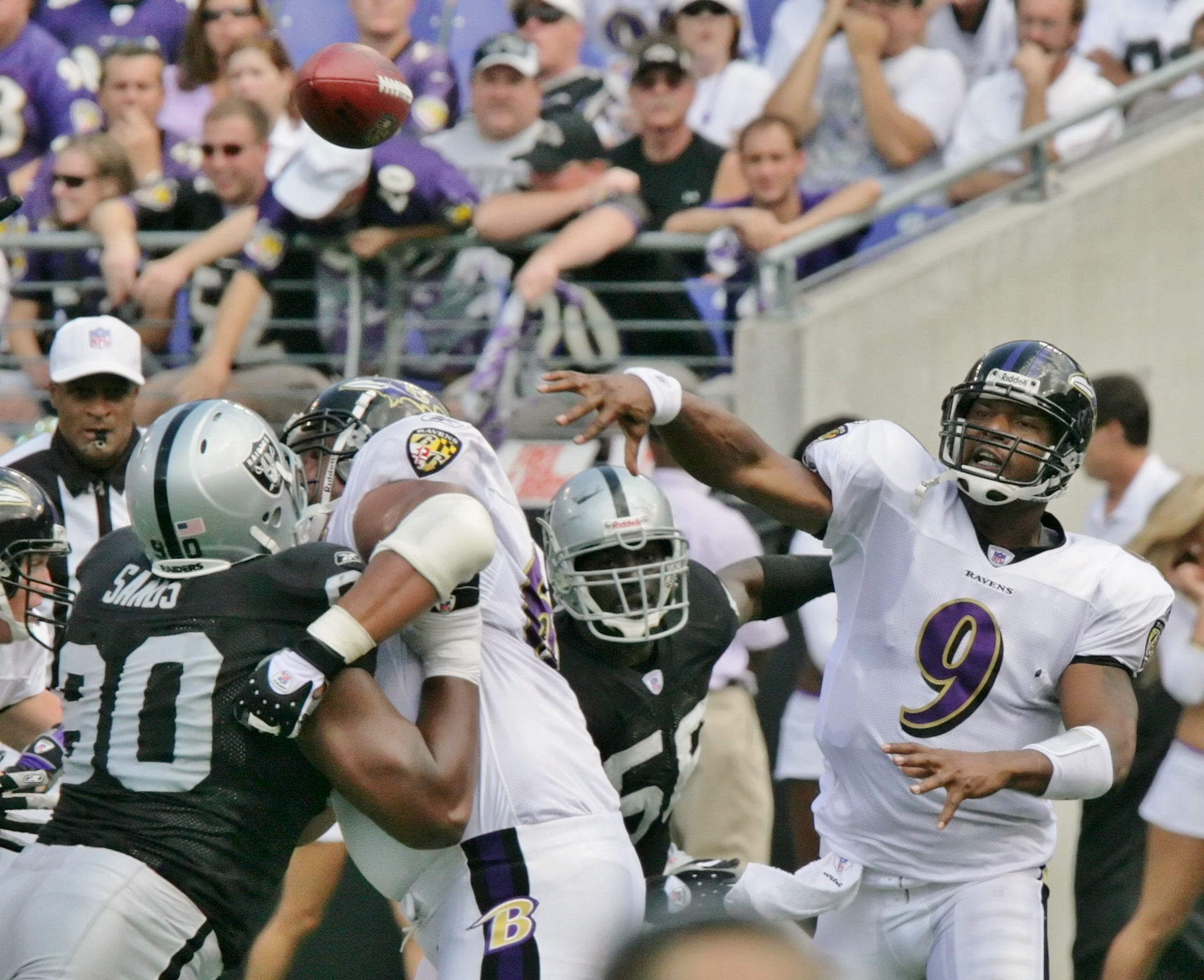
McNair in 2006

The 2006 season saw McNair start each game for the Ravens, missing only portions of two games. During Week 14 against the Kansas City Chiefs, McNair threw the longest regular-season touchdown pass in the Ravens' history, an 89-yard touchdown pass to Mark Clayton. McNair led Baltimore to a 13–3 record and an AFC North title. He made his first playoff start as a Raven against the Colts on January 13, 2007. McNair completed 18 of 29 pass attempts for 173 yards and two interceptions as the Ravens lost 15–6.

==== 2007 season ====
On May 9, 2007, McNair was arrested in Nashville for drunk driving even though he was not driving at the time. It is a misdemeanor offense in Tennessee for an owner of a motor vehicle to knowingly allow an intoxicated person to drive the vehicle. McNair was riding in his own pickup truck as a passenger when the police stopped the truck's driver, McNair's brother-in-law, for speeding. The driver failed a field sobriety test and was arrested for DUI; McNair was charged with DUI by consent. The quarterback's charge was dropped on July 10, 2007, when McNair's brother-in-law pleaded guilty to reckless driving.

In 2007, McNair did not play in Week 2 against the Jets, which the Ravens won 20–13. He also did not play the full game in Week 3, but the Ravens won 26–23. McNair missed nine more games during the rest of the season, due primarily to injury, only starting in six games.

=== Retirement ===
After 13 seasons in the NFL, McNair announced his retirement from professional football in April 2008. Along with Fran Tarkenton and Steve Young, McNair was one of just three quarterbacks at the time to throw for 30,000 yards and run for 3,500 yards.

McNair was inducted into the Titans/Oilers Ring of Honor on October 27, 2008. In July 2012, McNair was named the 35th greatest quarterback of the NFL's post-merger era, according to Football Nation. His number was retired by the Titans during a halftime ceremony on September 15, 2019.

McNair was inducted into the Black College Football Hall of Fame in 2012 and the College Football Hall of Fame in 2020.

== Career statistics ==
Legend
| | AP NFL MVP (joint) |
| | Led the league |
| **Bold** | Career high |

=== NFL ===
==== Regular season ====
| Year | Team | Games | | | Passing | | | | | | | | Rushing | | | | Fumbles | |
| Year | Team | GP | GS | Record | Cmp | Att | Pct | Yds | Avg | TD | Int | Rtg | Att | Yds | Avg | TD | Fum | Lost |
|---|---|---|---|---|---|---|---|---|---|---|---|---|---|---|---|---|---|---|
| 1995 | HOU | 4 | 2 | 2–0 | 41 | 80 | 51.3 | 569 | 7.1 | 3 | 1 | 81.7 | 11 | 38 | 3.5 | 0 | 3 | 0 |
| 1996 | HOU | 9 | 4 | 2–2 | 88 | 143 | 61.5 | 1,197 | **8.4** | 6 | 4 | 90.6 | 31 | 169 | 5.5 | 2 | 7 | 4 |
| 1997 | TEN | 16 | 16 | 8–8 | 216 | 415 | 52.0 | 2,665 | 6.4 | 14 | 13 | 70.4 | **101** | **674** | 6.7 | **8** | **16** | 5 |
| 1998 | TEN | 16 | 16 | 8–8 | 289 | **492** | 58.7 | 3,228 | 6.6 | 15 | 10 | 80.1 | 77 | 559 | **7.3** | 4 | 5 | 2 |
| 1999 | TEN | 11 | 11 | 9–2 | 187 | 331 | 56.5 | 2,179 | 6.6 | 12 | 8 | 78.6 | 72 | 337 | 4.7 | **8** | 3 | 1 |
| 2000 | TEN | 16 | 15 | 12–3 | 248 | 396 | 62.6 | 2,847 | 7.2 | 15 | 13 | 83.2 | 72 | 403 | 5.6 | 0 | 12 | **6** |
| 2001 | TEN | 15 | 15 | 7–8 | 264 | 431 | 61.3 | 3,350 | 7.8 | 21 | 12 | 90.2 | 75 | 414 | 5.5 | 5 | 5 | 1 |
| 2002 | TEN | 16 | 16 | 11–5 | **301** | **492** | 61.2 | **3,387** | 6.9 | 22 | **15** | 84.0 | 82 | 440 | 5.4 | 3 | 9 | 2 |
| 2003 | TEN | 14 | 14 | 10–4 | 250 | 400 | 62.5 | 3,215 | 8.0 | **24** | 7 | **100.4** | 38 | 138 | 3.6 | 4 | 12 | **6** |
| 2004 | TEN | 8 | 8 | 3–5 | 129 | 215 | 60.0 | 1,343 | 6.2 | 8 | 9 | 73.1 | 23 | 128 | 5.6 | 1 | 5 | 3 |
| 2005 | TEN | 14 | 14 | 4–10 | 292 | 476 | 61.3 | 3,161 | 6.6 | 16 | 11 | 82.4 | 32 | 139 | 4.3 | 1 | 7 | 4 |
| 2006 | BAL | 16 | 16 | **13–3** | 295 | 468 | 63.0 | 3,050 | 6.5 | 16 | 12 | 82.5 | 45 | 119 | 2.6 | 1 | 7 | 1 |
| 2007 | BAL | 6 | 6 | 2–4 | 133 | 205 | **64.9** | 1,113 | 5.4 | 2 | 4 | 73.9 | 10 | 32 | 3.2 | 0 | 8 | 4 |
| Career | | 161 | 153 | 91–62 | 2,733 | 4,544 | 60.1 | 31,304 | 6.9 | 174 | 119 | 82.8 | 669 | 3,590 | 5.4 | 37 | 99 | 39 |

==== Postseason ====
| Year | Team | Games | | | Passing | | | | | | | | Rushing | | | | Fumbles | |
| Year | Team | GP | GS | Record | Cmp | Att | Pct | Yds | Avg | TD | Int | Rtg | Att | Yds | Avg | TD | Fum | Lost |
|---|---|---|---|---|---|---|---|---|---|---|---|---|---|---|---|---|---|---|
| 1999 | TEN | 4 | 4 | **3–1** | **62** | **107** | 57.9 | 514 | 4.8 | 1 | 2 | 65.7 | **30** | **209** | **7.0** | **3** | **2** | **1** |
| 2000 | TEN | 1 | 1 | 0–1 | 24 | 46 | 52.2 | 176 | 3.8 | 0 | 1 | 52.4 | 5 | 31 | 6.2 | 0 | 0 | 0 |
| 2002 | TEN | 2 | 2 | 1–1 | 48 | 80 | 60.0 | **532** | 6.7 | **3** | 2 | **81.9** | 13 | 82 | 6.3 | **3** | 0 | 0 |
| 2003 | TEN | 2 | 2 | 1–1 | 32 | 49 | **65.3** | 369 | **7.5** | 2 | **4** | 67.5 | 6 | 27 | 4.5 | 0 | 0 | 0 |
| 2006 | BAL | 1 | 1 | 0–1 | 18 | 29 | 62.1 | 173 | 6.0 | 0 | 2 | 49.9 | 1 | 6 | 6.0 | 0 | 1 | **1** |
| Career | | 10 | 10 | 5–5 | 184 | 311 | 59.2 | 1,764 | 5.7 | 6 | 11 | 66.7 | 55 | 355 | 6.5 | 6 | 3 | 2 |

=== College ===
| Season | GP | Passing | | | | | | | | Rushing | |
| Season | GP | Cmp | Att | Pct | Yds | Avg | Lng | TD | Rtg | Att | Yds |
|---|---|---|---|---|---|---|---|---|---|---|---|
| 1991 | 10 | 189 | 338 | 55.9 | 2,895 | 8.6 | 80 | 24 | 89.8 | 57 | 242 |
| 1992 | 11 | 231 | 419 | 55.1 | 3,541 | 8.5 | 85 | 29 | 95.4 | 92 | 516 |
| 1993 | 11 | 204 | 386 | 52.8 | 3,197 | 8.3 | 90 | 22 | 83.4 | 107 | 633 |
| 1994 | 11 | **356** | **612** | **58.2** | **5,377** | **8.8** | **99** | **47** | **102.5** | **128** | **904** |
| Career | 43 | 980 | 1,755 | 55.8 | 15,010 | 8.5 | 99 | 122 | 92.8 | 384 | 2,295 |

== Awards and honors ==
NFL

- NFL Most Valuable Player (2003)
- Second-team All-Pro (2003)
- 3× Pro Bowl (2000, 2003, 2005)
- NFL passer rating leader (2003)
- Alan Page Community Award (2006)
- Titans/Oilers Ring of Honor (2008)
- Tennessee Titans No. 9 retired (2019)
- 2× AFC Offensive Player of the Month (December 2002, October 2003)
- 4× AFC Offensive Player of the Week (Week 16, 1999; Week 8, 2001; Week 12, 2001; Week 8, 2002)
- 3× Pro Football Weekly NFL Offensive Player of the Week (Week 16, 1999; Week 8, 2001; Week 6, 2003)

College

- Walter Payton Award (1994)
- Eddie Robinson Trophy (1994)
- 4× SWAC Offensive Player of the Year (1991–1994)
- SWAC Freshman of the Year (1991)
- 4× First-team All-SWAC (1991–1994)
- College Football Hall of Fame (2020)
- Black College Football Hall of Fame (2012)

== Personal life ==
McNair was married to Mechelle McNair from June 21, 1997, until his death. McNair split his time between a farm in Mississippi and Nashville, Tennessee. McNair had two sons with Mechelle: Tyler and Trenton; and sons, Stephen Jr. and Steven O'Brian from two relationships prior to his marriage to Mechelle.

McNair earned the nickname "Air McNair" in high school. He opened his own restaurant in Nashville, which he named Gridiron9. McNair is a cousin of NFL linebacker Demario Davis.

== Death ==
On July 4, 2009, McNair was found dead from multiple gunshot wounds, along with the body of a 20-year-old woman named Sahel "Jenni" Kazemi, in a condominium rented by McNair in downtown Nashville. He was 36 years old. Kazemi and McNair had been previously involved with each other romantically. The day of the shooting, text messages between the pair were exchanged proclaiming their love to one another in which Kazemi texted the victim, "u love me" in which McNair replied, "I love you baby." There was also a conversation about financial issues where McNair transferred $2,000 to Kazemi, who said she was "stressed" and needed to pay her phone bill. McNair then offered to come over to check on her after she said her chest felt heavy. The night of his death, McNair put his children to bed, and then at 11:00 p.m. he texted Kazemi, "On my way."

McNair, who was believed to have been asleep on the couch when the shooting occurred, was shot twice in the chest and twice in the head, with only one of the shots coming from closer than three feet (0.9 m). After killing him, Kazemi sat on the couch beside him and shot herself in the temple. The bodies were discovered by McNair's friends, Wayne Neely and Robert Gaddy, who called 911. The Nashville police declared McNair's death a murder-suicide, with Kazemi as the perpetrator and McNair as the victim. The 9-mm gun used was found under Kazemi's body and later tests revealed "trace evidence of (gunpowder) residue on her left hand. Kazemi had a worsening financial situation and also suspected that McNair was in another extramarital relationship.

Two days before their deaths, Kazemi was pulled over in a black 2007 Cadillac Escalade in Nashville. McNair was in the passenger seat and Vent Gordon, a chef at a restaurant McNair owned, was in the back seat. The vehicle was registered in the names of both McNair and Kazemi. She was charged with driving under the influence of alcohol. McNair was not arrested, instead leaving in a taxi with Gordon, despite Kazemi repeatedly asking the arresting officer to tell McNair to come to the police car to talk to her. However, McNair later bailed Kazemi out of jail. The police later stated that after being released from jail, Kazemi purchased the gun from a convicted murderer she met while looking for a buyer for her Kia.

Titans owner Bud Adams released a statement regarding McNair:

We are saddened and shocked to hear the news of Steve McNair's passing today. He was one of the finest players to play for our organization and one of the most beloved players by our fans. He played with unquestioned heart and leadership and led us to places that we had never reached, including our only Super Bowl. Our thoughts and prayers are with his family as they deal with his untimely passing.

In a statement to the AP, Ozzie Newsome, executive vice president and general manager of the Baltimore Ravens, stated:

This is so, so sad. We immediately think of his family, his boys. They are all in our thoughts and prayers. What we admired most about Steve when we played against him was his competitive spirit, and we were lucky enough to have that with us for two years. He is one of the best players in the NFL over the last 20 years...

The Titans held a two-day memorial at LP Field on July 8 and 9, 2009, where fans could pay their last respects to McNair. Highlights of his career were played throughout both days, and fans were able to sign books that were later given to the McNair family.

During the 2009 NFL season, every member of the Titans wore a commemorative "9" sticker placed on the back of their helmet to honor McNair. Funeral services were held for McNair at the Reed Green Coliseum on the campus of the University of Southern Mississippi on July 11; he was buried at Griffith Cemetery in Prentiss, Mississippi.

McNair died without a last will and testament, and his assets were frozen pending probate of his estate. On October 15, 2010, it was reported that McNair's widow had asked a Nashville judge that at least a portion of the assets be unfrozen for his children's care and expenses until the estate matters were resolved in court. The judge agreed, and each of the four children received $500,000.
