= Covington County School District (Mississippi) =

School district in Mississippi

Covington County Schools
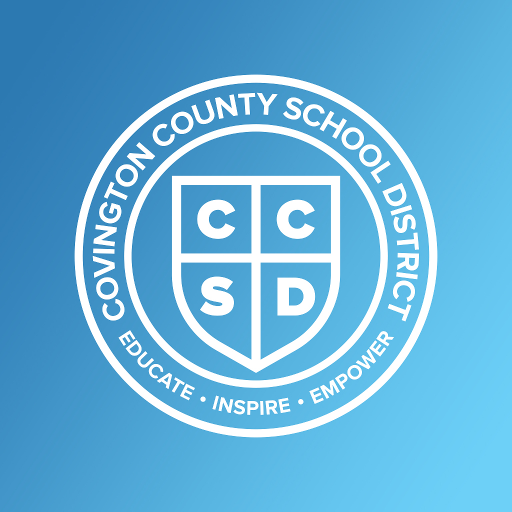

Location
- 1211 S Dogwood Ave Pine Belt Collins, 39428; United States
- Coordinates: 31.63701°N 89.549894°W

District information
- Type: Public
- Motto: Educate. Motivate. Graduate.
- Grades: K-12
- Superintendent: Babette Duty
- Asst. superintendent(s): Susan Deen, Director of Curriculum; Missy Rogers, Federal Programs; Rachel Rogers, Special Programs
- Business administrator: Rita Clark
- School board: René Shoemaker; Scott McRaney; Charles Beasley; Sammy Herrin; Terry Bryant
- Governing agency: Mississippi Department of Education
- Accreditation: MDE Office of Accreditation
- Schools: Elementary 4 Middle 2 High 3 Alternative 1 Vocational 1
- Budget: $29,825,026 (FY 2016 estimate)
- NCES District ID: 2801290

Students and staff
- Students: 2,605 (21-22)
- Staff: 210 (21-22)
- Student–teacher ratio: 12.36:1 (21-22)
- Athletic conference: MHSAA

Other information
- Schedule: M-F from August to May (except state and federal holidays)
- Website: http://www.covingtoncountyschools.org

Covington County Schools is a public school district in Covington County, Mississippi that serves students living in all areas of the county, including the towns of Collins, Seminary, and Mount Olive. The district serves approximately 2,600 students within its boundaries.

In the district, there are ten schools located across seven different campuses. For the majority of its existence, the district has struggle with integration efforts. In 2021, federal courts released the district from oversight concerning desegregation efforts and declared the district to have unitary status.

== Overview ==
=== Early history ===
The first public school established in Covington County was in the Salem community. Little is known about the date of establishment, only that a Mr. James Hill led instruction. The legislature of Covington County passed an act in 1837 which created the now-defunct Male and Female Academy in present day Mt. Carmel. In subsequent years, the legislature created the Male and Female College (1841) in Williamsburg, Mississippi and the Zion Seminary College (1846) at the present day site of Seminary Attendance Center. In the past, Covington County School District consisted of over 100 small, rural schools. So many schools caused problems regarding funding, with superintendent N. B. Holcomb reporting in 1895 that "funds are so divided as to place so little to each school that it don't [sic] amount to much after it is placed". Holcomb also noted that there were no secondary education schools located in the county, although the district planned for their development. In the report to the Mississippi Department of Education, superintendent N. B. Holcomb also reports that the introduction of a Teachers' Institute and Teachers' Library into the district was "the most factor in enabling teachers to secure prompt attendance and good deportment".

=== Desegregation ===
Throughout much of the history of Covington County, the school system was under de jure segregation. On December 12, 1966, the United States Department of Justice filed a case against the school district to challenge a "freedom of choice" school desegregation plan in place, which was combined in a suit against 25 other districts. A report from the Mississippi Sovereignty Commission dated July 7, 1967 relays the situation in Mount Olive, saying:

I then proceeded to Mount Olive, Mississippi and found that there is no racial trouble or subversive persons operating in that area at this time. Their elementary schools are integrated and their high school did have two Negros enrolled but they dropped out after the first few weeks. There is no trouble in Mt. Olive at the present time and they do not anticipate any unless it occurs during the primaries.

— A. L. Hopkins, Investigation in Rankin, Scott, Covington, and Simpson counties for the purposes of ascertaining if subversive persons were operating in this area at this time, page 2

Eventually, on November 7, 1969, the courts issued an order to desegregate the county schools. In 1970, sixteen years after the Supreme Court's decision in Brown vs. Board of Education, the Covington County School District began integration of all its schools, with the exception of Hopewell Elementary. There was a small demonstration of approximately 25 parents, who gathered in front of three schools to picket the decision to integrate schools, as well as white students who stayed home. However, there was little white flight or protest in response to the move, in spite of "an effort [by Citizens for Local Control of Education] to get 1,000 mothers in ... Covington County to picket against the massive integration orders..." (Bolton, 2007, p. 182).

Eventually, the case returned to the court system when it was discovered that 25 white students in the Hopewell zone were not attending the school. The Fifth Circuit required the district to modify attendance requirements so that all students in Hopewell would attend the school. After no activity for almost 30 years, the Department of Justice filed a motion for further relief that required Covington County Schools not use race for selection in extracurricular activities and develop non-discrimination policies to govern this. In addition, a settlement between the Department of Justice and Covington County Schools led to specific provisions which the county must follow relating to desegregation efforts. The Department of Justice received annual reports from the school district throughout the 2010s. In October 2020, Covington County School District filed for a declaration of "unitary status". By March 2021, 67 years after the decision in Brown v. Board of Education, the court concluded that Covington County School District was no longer segregated, lifting the injunctions and releasing jurisdiction.

=== Current Schools ===
Elementary Schools	Middle Schools	High Schools	Other
Seminary Elementary School	Seminary Middle School	Seminary High School	Covington County Vocational Center
Collins Elementary School	Carver Middle School	Collins High School	Covington County Alternative School
Mount Olive Elementary School		Mount Olive High School	
Hopewell Elementary School			

== Lawsuits ==
=== Covington County School District vs. G. W., a minor ===
On December 4, 1998, a teacher reported to the assistant principal that G. W., a student at Seminary High School, had been drinking beer in the school parking lot. The assistant principal and school resource officer investigated and found empty beer cans in a toolbox on the back of the student's truck. When questioned, the student admitted that it was his alcohol. G. W. received a parental contact and five-day suspension. On December 8, a letter was sent to the family concerning an expulsion hearing to occur on December 17. At the hearing, G. W. was officially expelled from Seminary for the remainder of the school year and placed in the district's alternative school. The family appealed to the Chancery Court, which reversed the district's decision.

The Mississippi Supreme Court upheld the school board decision and reversed the Chancery Court. The official conclusion, according to FindLaw (COVINGTON COUNTY v. G.W., a Minor., 2000), stated:

"The school district's failure to follow the procedures set forth in the handbook, while problematic, did not deny G.W. any substantive or due process rights under the Fourth and Fourteenth Amendments to the United States Constitution. Any possible due process violations were cured when G.W. received the second formal hearing. Additionally, we find the search of G.W.'s automobile by a school official, while on school property, did not violate the search and seizure clause of the Fourth Amendment. Therefore, this Court reverses and renders the decision of the Covington County Chancery Court and reinstates the decision of the Covington County School District."

=== Other lawsuits ===
- Covington County School District vs. Lutricia Magee
- Doe vs. Covington County School District

== Notable events ==
=== 1985 Teacher strike ===
Along with teachers in Lamar County, Forrest County, and Stone County, instructors in Covington County participated in a strike against the Governor and Legislature, calling for the state to raise teacher salaries by $7,000 over two years. This occurred in spite of a restraining order against the strike, which was originally endorsed by the Mississippi Educator's Association. The endorsement was eventually rescinded, and the MEA joined the Mississippi American Federation of Teachers to advise against the strike.

=== Math Institute ===
During the 2003–04 school year, as part of a project under No Child Left Behind, the University of Southern Mississippi selected Covington County Schools as one of eleven school districts to participate in its Math Institute. At the end, the hope was that the program would lead to a lower percentage of students scoring at the minimal and basic level on state achievement tests.

=== Adoption of CHART program ===
In 2012, the Covington County School Board adopted the CHART policy to teach sexual education. Mississippi First reports that this move allows "all [Covington County] public school students in grades 6-9 ... access to evidence-based sex education this fall." The adoption raised the number of Mississippi school districts participating in CHART to 30.

=== SPEPA Adopt-A-School Program ===
In 2017, Southern Pine Electric Power Association began a program to adopt various schools in their service areas, choosing Hopewell Elementary as the first school to participate. The elementary school will receive volunteers for projects and donations of school supplies. Under the new program, Southern Pine employees will work with teachers, parents, and community members to provide needed resources for students and young people.

== Accountability statistics ==
=== Mississippi Academic Achievement Program Scores ===
The following chart shows the last five years of achievement data according to the Mississippi Succeeds Report Card from the Mississippi Department of Education. An "i" on the chart indicates that scores were not computed for the school year in question due to the COVID-19 pandemic.

	2021-22	2020-21	2019-20	2018-19	2017-18
Letter Grade of "A"	1	i	i	2	1
Letter Grade of "B"	2	i	i	1	0
Letter Grade of "C"	0	i	i	3	3
Letter Grade of "D"	5	i	i	2	2
Letter Grade of "F"	0	i	i	0	2
Not Assigned	2	i	i	2	2
Overall District	C	i	i	C	D

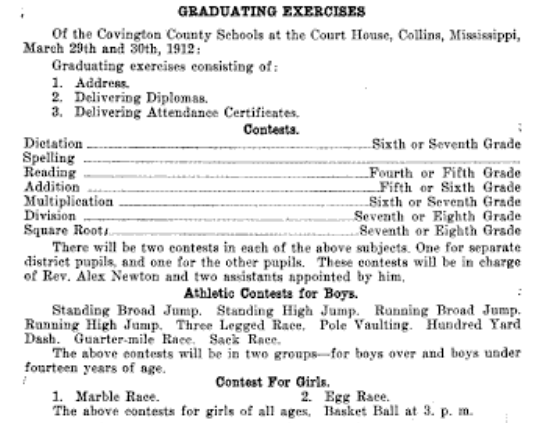
Graduation Program for Class of 1912

=== Four-year graduation rates ===
According to a report by the Division of Research and Development at the Mississippi Department of Education, the school district's current graduation rates for general education students, 77.2%, are below Mississippi's 6-year average of 82.3%. However, district drop-out rates for general education students, at 10.5%, are slightly lower than the state's six-year average of 10.8%. Regarding students with disabilities, the graduation rate is 13.8%, significantly below the statewide graduation rate of 34.7%. The document does not mention drop-out rates for students with disabilities.

	N Count (rounded)	4 Year Graduation Rate	Dropout Rate
General Education Students	225	77.2%	10.5%
Students with Disabilities	30	13.8%	

== Demographics ==
=== Financial ===
According to Empower Mississippi, Covington County Schools spent approximately $8,578.36 per student in the 2013-2014 school year. During the 2017-2018 school year, the district received $1,396,764 in Title I funds. The Mississippi Department of Revenue lists the school district millage rate is 36.31 out of 85.75 total mills; this accounts for 42.34 percent of millage taxes in Covington County.

=== Racial ===
The most recent racial demographic data for the district's available on the NCES website. According to it, during the most recent information available, the racial composition of the overall district was as follows:

Race/Ethnicity	Student body
Caucasian	60%
African-American	37%
Hispanic	2%
American Indian or Alaskan Native	0%
Asian	0%
Hawaiian or Pacific Islander	0%
Some other race	0%
Two or more races	0%

== See also ==
- List of school districts in Mississippi
