= Collins High School (Mississippi) =

Location
- 1208 South Dogwood, Collins, MS 39428; United States
- 31.6366°N 89.5471°W

Information
- School district: Covington County School District
- Principal: Brian Bagwell
- Staff: 32.59 (FTE)
- Grades: 7–12
- Gender: Coeducational
- Enrollment: 424 (2023–2024)
- Student to teacher ratio: 13.01
- Colors: Green and white
- Team name: Tigers
- Website: chs.covingtoncountyschools.org

Collins High School is a high school in Collins, Mississippi. It is a part of the Covington County School District. The student body is predominantly African American.
