= Amos P. Godby High School =

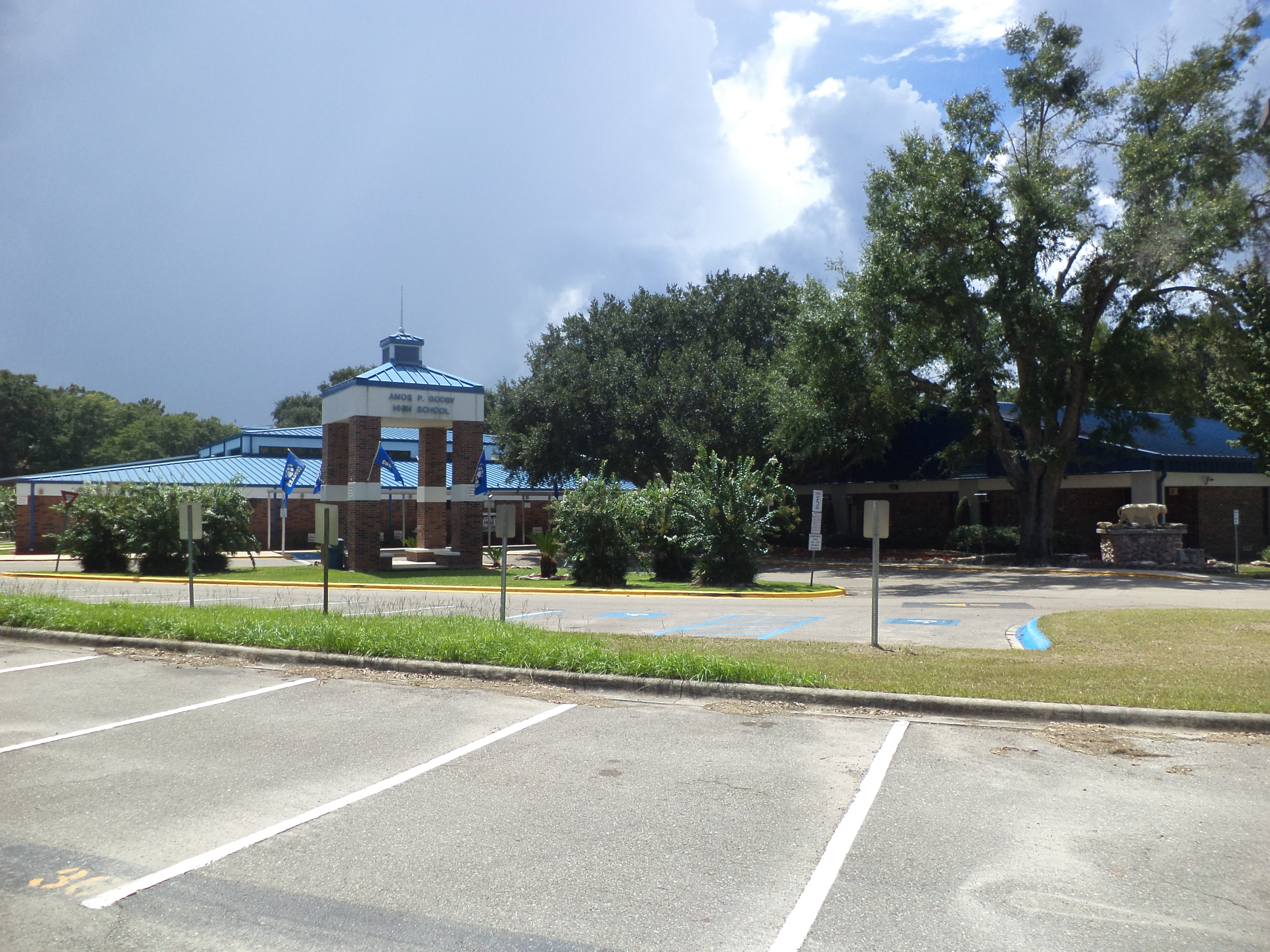

Location
- 1717 West Tharpe Street; Tallahassee, Florida 32303-4441; United States; 30°27′39″N 84°18′59″W

Information
- Type: Public coeducational secondary
- Established: 1966
- School district: Leon County Schools
- Principal: Marcus Scott
- Staff: 67.53 (on an FTE basis)
- Grades: 9 – 12
- Enrollment: 1,396 (2023-2024)
- Student to teacher ratio: 20.67
- Colors: Royal blue and white
- Nickname: Cougars
- Rivals: Rickards Raiders, Leon Lions
- Website: School website

Amos P. Godby High School is a public high school in Tallahassee, Florida, named for Amos P. Godby, who first served as a teacher and coach at Leon High School, and later became Leon County Superintendent and President and Secretary of the Florida Superintendents Association.

== History ==
Amos P. Godby High School opened in 1966 in the wake of desegregation and succeeded Old Lincoln High School. It is at 1717 West Tharpe Street in Tallahassee, Florida, 32303. Its first senior class graduated in 1970.

Principals

- 1966 - 1968: O. D. Roberts
- 1968 - 1970: Stan Hilaman
- 1970 - 1973: Paul Coley
- 1973 - 1977: John E. Lawrence
- 1977 - 1989: William J. Montford
- 1989 - 1999: Merry (McDaris) Ortega
- 1999 - 2001: Ben Koenig
- 2001 - 2006: Randy Pridgeon
- 2007 - 2011: Jean Ferguson
- 2011 - 2012: Gillian Gregory
- 2012 - 2017: Shelly Bell
- 2017–2026: Desmond Cole

"2026-Present: Marcus Scott

In 2022, the student body was about 71 Black, 13 percent Hispanic and 11 percent white.

== Athletics ==
Godby High School's mascot is the Cougar, and their colors are royal blue and white.

Sports offerings at the school include:

- Fall sports: cross country, football, boys' and girls' golf, and volleyball
- Winter sports: boys' and girls' basketball, boys' and girls' soccer, wrestling, and girls' weightlifting
- Spring sports: baseball, flag football, softball, tennis, boys' (current state champions) and girls' track, and weightlifting

=== Championship ===
- 1976 Class 4A State Champions in football
- 1986 Class 3A State Champions in football
- 1987 Class 4A State Champions in football
- 2001 Class 4A State Champions in baseball
- 2013 Class 5A State Champions in football

== Notable alumni ==
- [Bryan Clark] Professional Wrestler 3 WCW Time Tag Team Champion and All-Japan Champion
- Butch Benton, former MLB player
- Travis Fisher, former NFL player, Nebraska Assistant Coach
- Buck Gurley, former NFL player
- Jaylen Key, Mr. Irrelevant of the 2024 NFL draft
- John Henry Mills, former NFL player
- Chad Plummer, former NFL player
- Mackey Sasser, former MLB player
- Javon Solomon, NFL defensive end for the Buffalo Bills
- John Wasdin, former MLB player
- Will White, former NFL player
- Nick Wiggins, basketball player
- Charles Wilson, former NFL player
- Jenny Worth, IFBB fitness & figure competitor

== See also ==
- Old Lincoln High School
