= Leon County Schools =

School district in Leon County, Florida

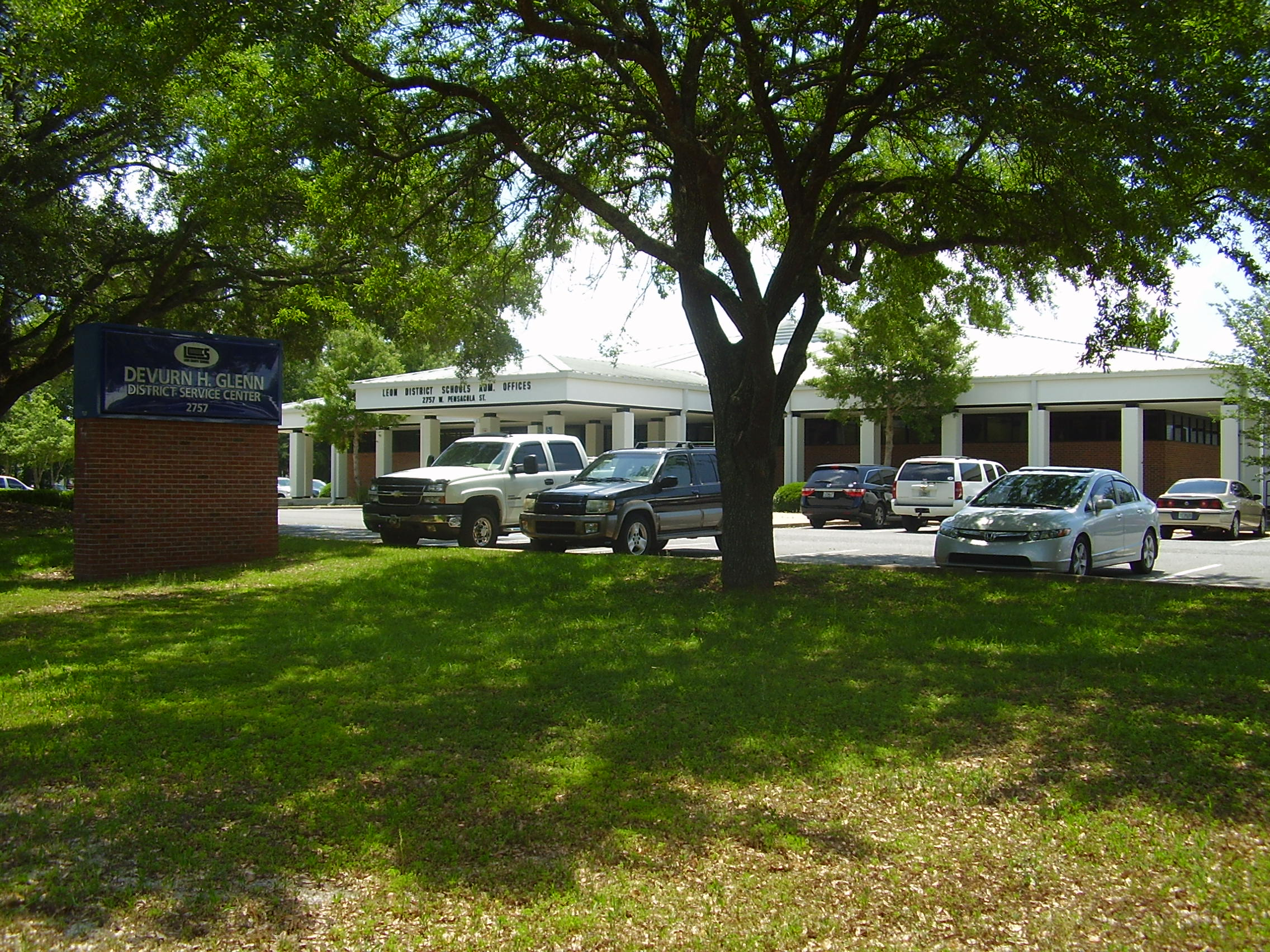
Devurn H. Glenn District Service Center

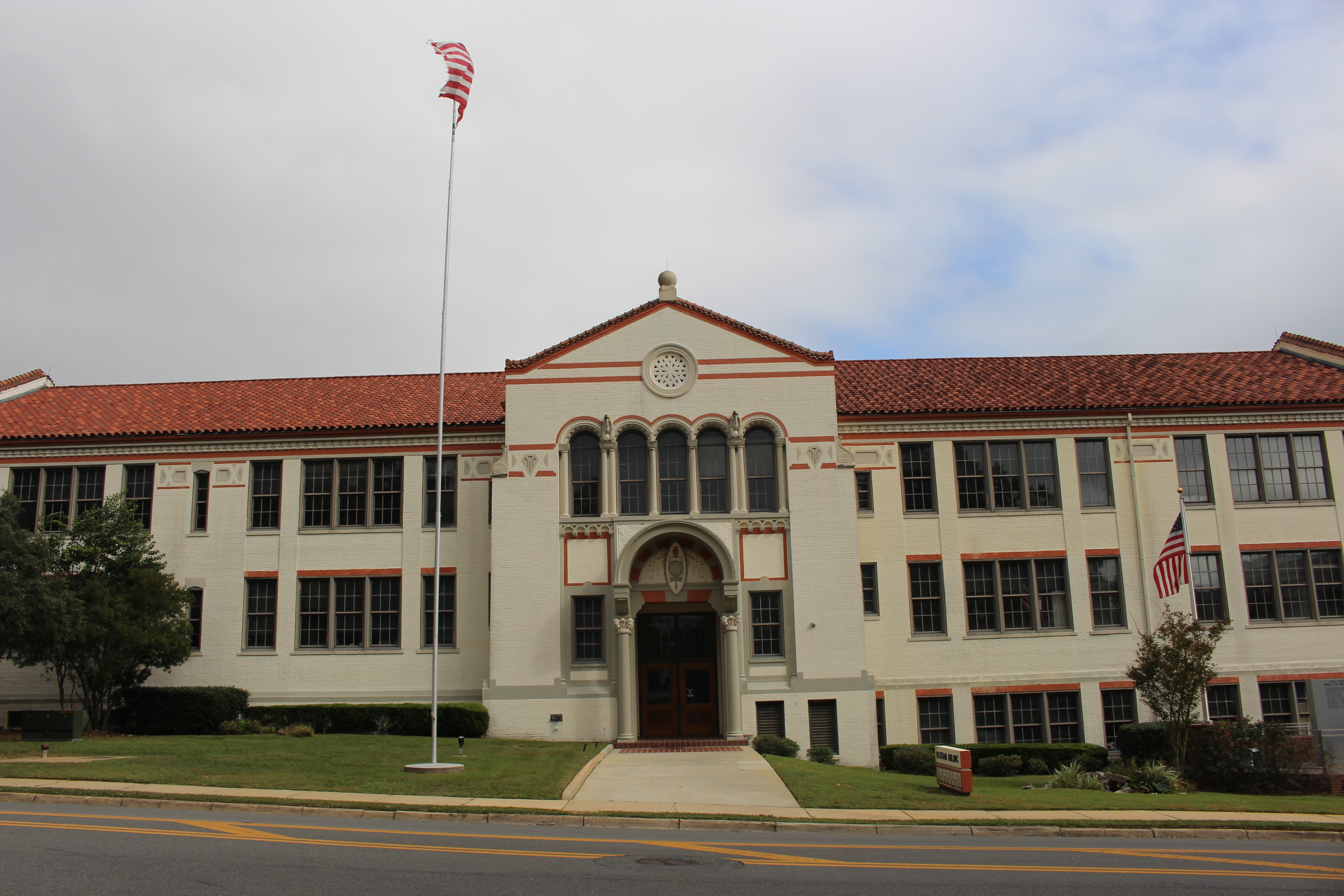
Bloxham Building

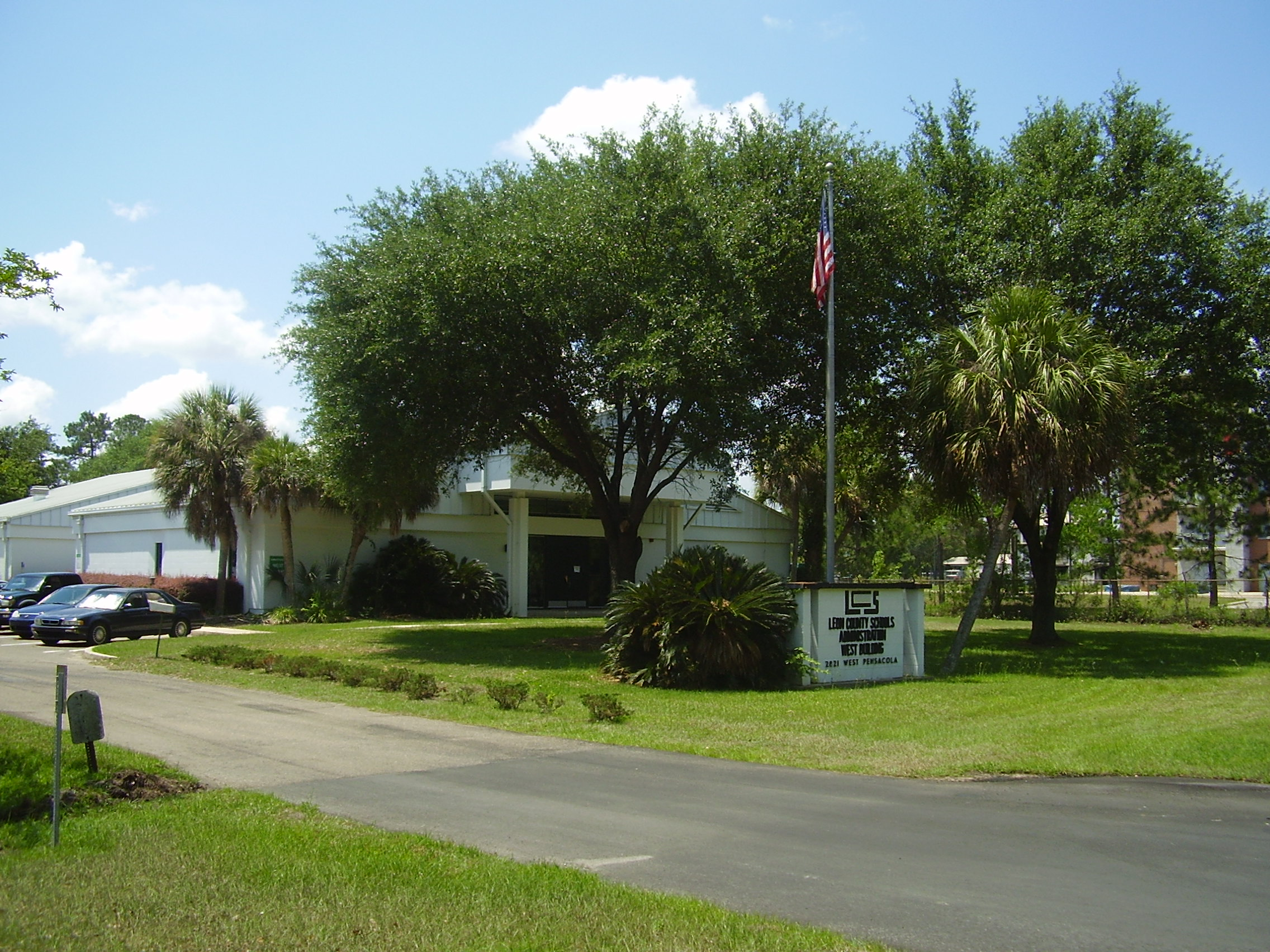
West Administration Building

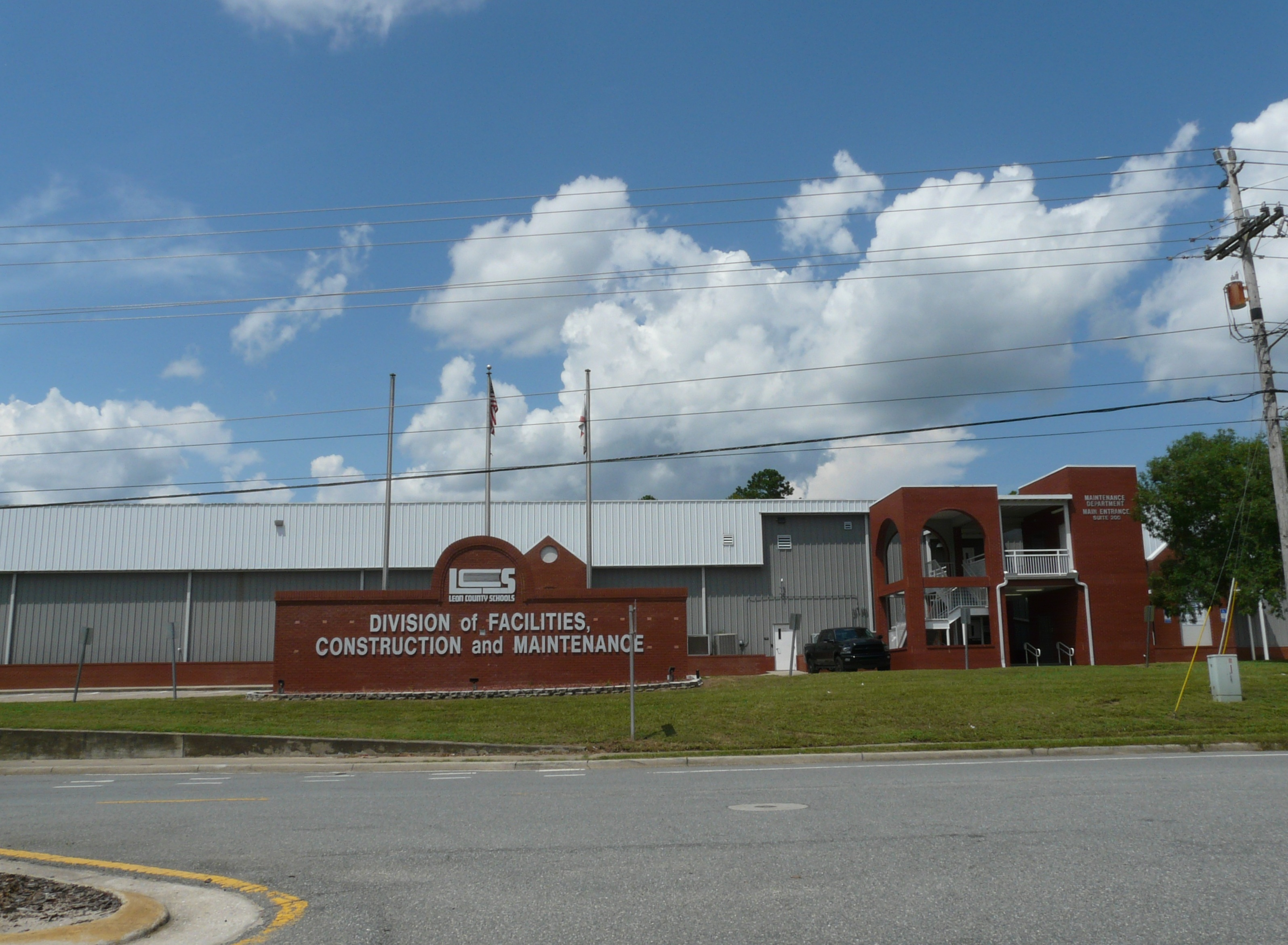
Division of Facilities, Construction, and Maintenance

Leon County Schools (LCS) is a school district headquartered in the LCS Admin Complex in Tallahassee, Florida, United States. It is the sole school district of Leon County.

== History ==
Prior to November 2004 the school district allowed parents to have their children moved to schools in proximity to where their parents worked.

== Public schools ==
=== Elementary schools ===
- Apalachee Elementary School (Est. 1969)
- Astoria Park Elementary School (Est. 1969)
- Bond Elementary School (Est. 1935, Current Structure Est. 2006)
- Buck Lake Elementary School (Est. 1989)
- Canopy Oaks Elementary School (Est. 1998)
- Chaires Elementary School (Est. 1929, Current structure Est. 1987)
- J. Michael Conley Elementary School (Est. 2008)
- DeSoto Trail Elementary School (Est. 1989)
- Fort Braden K-8 School (Est. 1847, Current Structure Est. 1994)
- Gilchrist Elementary School (Est. 1966)
- Hartsfield Elementary School (Est. 1954)
- Hawks Rise Elementary School (Est. 1995)
- Kate Sullivan Elementary School (Est. 1948)
- Killearn Lakes Elementary School (Est. 1985)
- Oak Ridge Elementary School (Est. 1969)
- Pineview Elementary School, Est. 1956
- Riley Elementary School (Est. 1951)
- Roberts Elementary School (Est. 2001)
- Ruediger Elementary School (Est. 1955)
- Sabal Palm Elementary School (Est. 1962)
- Sealey Elementary School (Est. 1930, Current Structure Est. 1969)
- Springwood Elementary School (Est. 1987)
- W T Moore Elementary School (Est. 1968)
- Woodville K-8 School (Est. 1856, Current Structure Est. 1981)

=== Middle schools ===
- Elizabeth Cobb Middle School, Est. 1954
- Deerlake Middle School, Est. 1990
- Fairview Middle School, Est. 1970
- Griffin Middle School, Est. 1920, Current Structure Est. 1955
- William J. Montford Middle School, Est. 2008
- R. Frank Nims Middle School, Est. 1958
- Augusta Raa Middle School, Est. 1959
- Swift Creek Middle School 1995

=== High schools ===
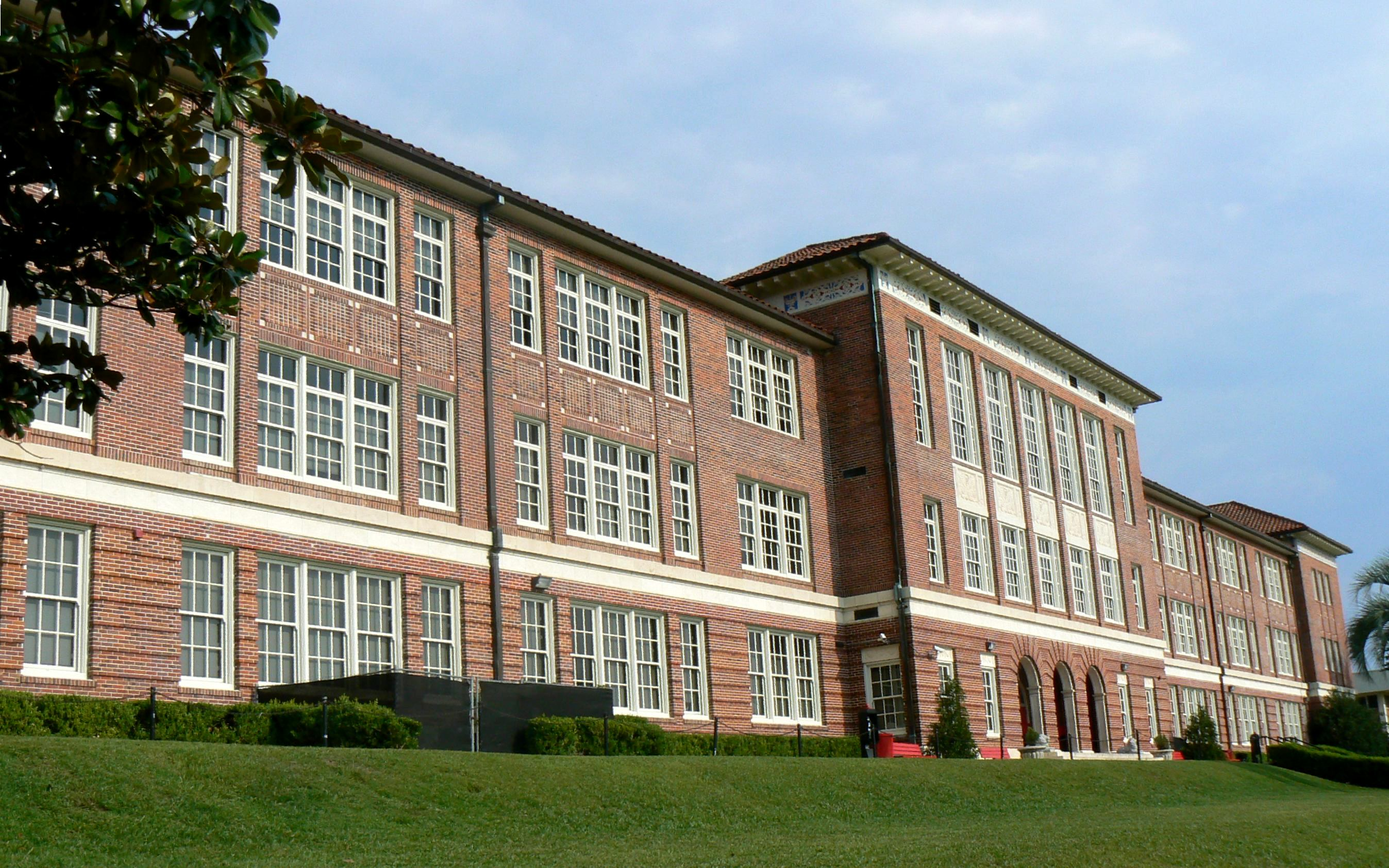
Leon High School

- Lawton Chiles (Mascot: Timberwolf), Est. 1999
- Godby (Mascot: Cougar), Est. 1966
- Leon (Mascot: Lion), Est. 1831
- Lincoln (Mascot: Trojan), Est. 1974
- Rickards (Mascot: Raider), Est. 1960
- SAIL (Mascot: Pirate), Est. 1975

=== Special and alternative schools ===
- Adult Education, Leon
- Everhart
- Leon Regional Detention Center
- Lively Technical Center
- Heritage Trails Community School (Jaguars)
- Second Chance

== Former LCS public schools ==
- Belle Vue Middle School, 1969–2009
- Caroline Brevard Grammar School, 1925–2007
- Leonard Wesson Elementary School, 1947–2007

=== Segregated schools ===
All of the following "colored" schools closed no later than the desegregation of Leon County schools in the late 1960s.

- Old Lincoln High School 1869–1969
- Station One School
- Concord School (Miccosukee)
- St. Peters School
- Lake McBride School
- Macon Community School
- Bell School
- Raney School
- Barrow Hill School
- Lucy Moten School
- Bellaire School
- Rural "negro" schoolhouse near Miller's Pond
- Rural "negro" schoolhouse in Saint Paul

== National Blue Ribbon Schools ==
The National Blue Ribbon Schools Program recognizes public and private elementary, middle, and high schools based on their overall academic excellence or their progress in closing achievement gaps among student subgroups. Only a few hundred are selected each year from across the nation. The following Leon County Schools have received this prestigious honor.

- Kate Sullivan Elementary School- 1985 & 2000
- Sealey Elementary School- 1989
- Hawks Rise Elementary School- 2000 & 2015
- Killearn Lakes Elementary School- 2004 & 2012
- Deerlake Middle School- 2005
- DeSoto Trail Elementary School- 2005
- Gilchrist Elementary School- 2008
