= Lawton Chiles High School =

Coordinates: 30.571695°N 84.2108015°W

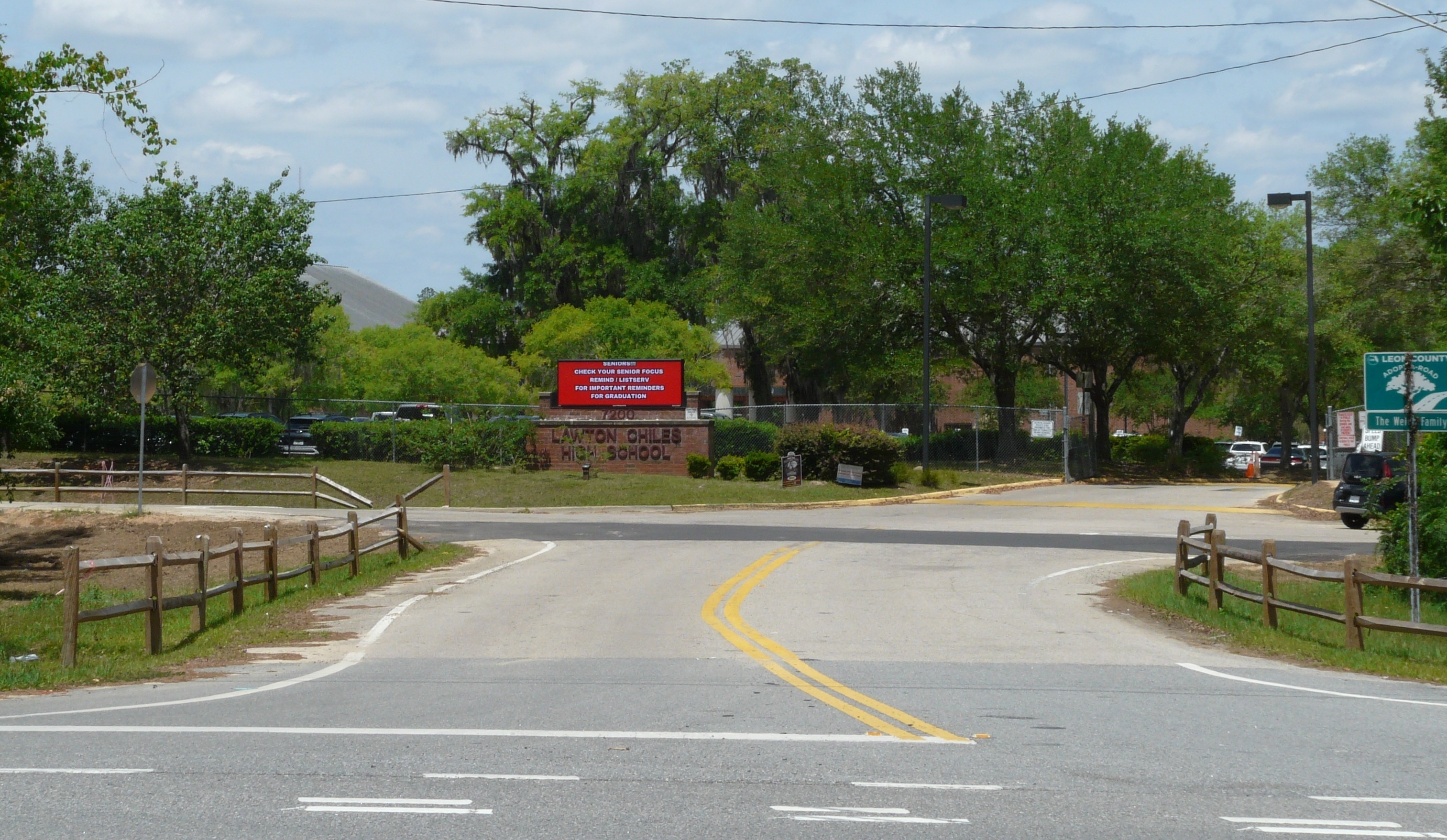
- School entrance

Location
- 7200 Lawton Chiles Lane; Tallahassee, Florida 32312; United States

Information
- Type: Public secondary
- Motto: Cognosco, Duco, Perficio (I learn, I lead, I achieve)
- Established: 1999
- School district: Leon County Schools
- Principal: Joe Burgess
- Staff: 76.26 (FTE)
- Grades: 9 to 12
- Enrollment: 1,928 (2023-2024)
- Student to teacher ratio: 25.28
- Colors: Maroon, silver, and black
- Mascot: Timberwolves
- Rivals: Maclay School and Leon High School
- Yearbook: Wolf Pack
- Information: (850) 488-1756
- Television: Wolfcenter Studios
- Website: https://www.leonschools.net/chiles

Lawton Chiles High School is a public high school located on US 319 in unincorporated Leon County, Florida, United States, north of Tallahassee. It is a part of the Leon County school district.

The school is named after Lawton Chiles, who was a U.S Senator and later Governor of Florida.

== History ==
Lawton Chiles High School was established in 1999 and is the newest public high school in the district. The first graduating class was the class of 2002. The school is named in honor of Lawton Chiles, governor of Florida from 1991 to 1998. The school motto, "Cognosco, Duco, Perficio" translates from Latin to "I learn, I lead, I achieve."

Chiles hosts a math competition for grades 4 through 9, called the "Mini Mu" and is similar to Mu Alpha Theta competitions.

== Student life ==
=== Academic activities ===
==== Advanced Placement programs ====
- Art History
- Biology
- Calculus AB
- Calculus BC
- Chemistry
- Computer Science A
- Computer Science Principles
- English Language and Composition
- English Literature and Composition
- Environmental Science
- European History
- French Language and Culture
- Human Geography
- Latin
- Macroeconomics
- Music Theory
- Physics 1: Algebra-Based
- Physics 2: Algebra-Based
- Physics C: Electricity and Magnetism
- Physics C: Mechanics
- Psychology
- Spanish Language and Culture
- Spanish Literature and Culture
- Statistics
- Studio Art: 2-D Design
- Studio Art: 3-D Design
- Studio Art: Drawing
- United States Government and Politics
- United States History
- World History

=== Co-curricular activities ===
- Band
- Chorus
- Corner Cafe
- Drama
- Externship
- Fine art
- Newspaper
- Orchestra
- Web Design
- Mu Alpha Theta
- WolfCenter Studios
- Yearbook

=== Athletics ===
- Baseball
- Basketball (boys' and girls')
- Cheerleading - 2017 Division 1A Large State Runner-Up, 2021 Division 1A Small State Runner-Up. Region 1 Champions in 2018, 2019, & 2021
- Cross country - Division 3A State Champions in 2003, 2005, 2006, and 2014
- Girls' cross country - three-peat Division 3A state champions in 2008, 2009, and 2010; Division 3A champions in 2015, 2017, 2018
- Dance
- Flag football
- Football
- Golf (boys' and girls')
- Lacrosse (boys')
- Soccer (boys' and girls') - 2015 Division 4A Boys State Champions
- Softball
- Special Olympics - through the ESE program, Chiles offers basketball for students with physical or mental disabilities
- Swimming - girls' swimming team 2010 State Champions: boys' swimming team 2016 and 2017 State Champions
- Tennis - Girl's Class 3A State Runner-Up 2017
- Track and Field - Division 3A State Champions in 2003, 2014, 2015, and 2016
- Volleyball
- Weightlifting (boys' and girls')
- Wrestling

== Notable alumni ==
- Amari Gainer, NFL linebacker for the Las Vegas Raiders
- Garrett Greene, NFL practice squad quarterback for the Tampa Bay Buccaneers
- Lily Williams (cyclist), Olympic gold medalist in women's team pursuit cycling at the 2024 Summer Olympics
- Wade Wilson, convicted murderer
