= Lewis and Lucretia Taylor House =

- Taylor House
- U.S. National Register of Historic Places
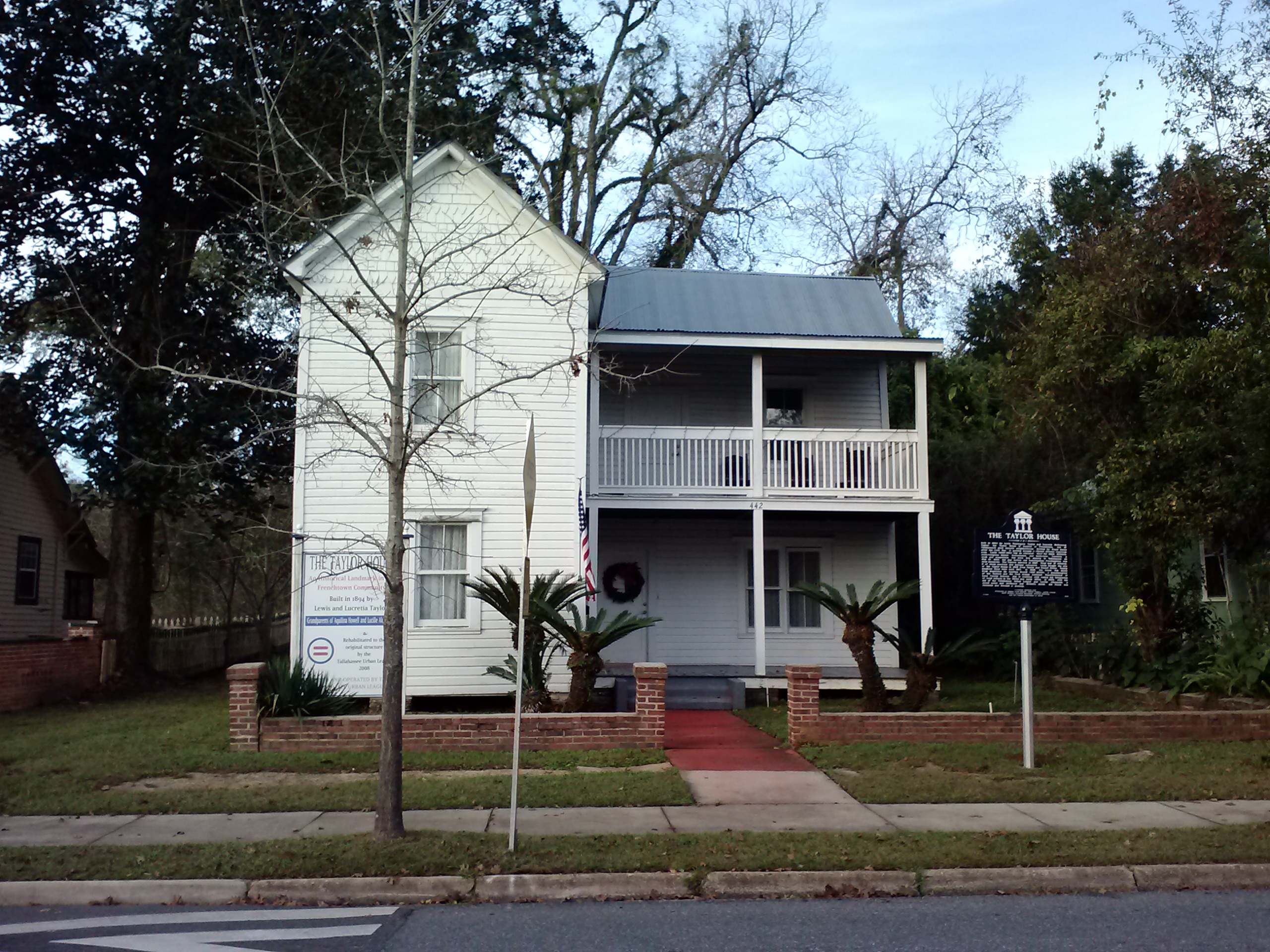

- Location within Florida Location within the United States
- Interactive map showing the location of Taylor House
- Location: Tallahassee, Florida
- Coordinates: 30°26′53″N 84°17′15″W
- NRHP reference No.: 15000127
- Added to NRHP: April 6, 2015

The Taylor House is a historic home in the Frenchtown neighborhood of Tallahassee, Florida. The home was added to the U.S. National Register of Historic Places on April 6, 2015. The Taylor House Museum, located at 442 West Georgia Street, was also added to the Tallahassee-Leon County Register of Historic Places on October 26, 2011. On July 27, 2012, the Florida Department of State designated the home a Florida Heritage Site.

== Taylor House Museum of Historic Frenchtown ==
The Taylor House, a historical landmark in the Tallahassee Community, was built in 1894 by Lewis Washington Taylor and Lucretia McPherson Taylor, and is a historical museum and research facility for Leon County, Florida.

== Lewis Washington Taylor ==
L.W. Taylor (1865-1931), was a well-known educator, businessman and community leader. He taught at Centerville School, Old Lincoln High School (Tallahassee, Florida) and Bel Air, a one-room, rural schoolhouse on ground which had once been an ante-bellum plantation. Taylor broke barriers for African-Americans in Leon County, as he taught and tutored White children from well-to-do families for 10 cents. Self-employed as a proprietor of a jewelry store, Taylor made his jewelry out of gold wire which he kept in an upstairs bedroom of the Taylor home.

== Lucretia McPherson Taylor ==
Lucretia Taylor descended from the Edwards, a pioneer Leon County family. She was a master cook and seamstress. Taylor was born a slave on May 19, 1865 in Tallahassee, a day before the Emancipation Proclamation was read downtown at the Knott House by General Edward M. McCook. She cooked for the family of Lewis M. Lively for whom the Lively Technical Center, located on the campus of Tallahassee Community College is named. Married on Dec. 17, 1887, the Taylors were parents to 13 children, who all spent time in front of a classroom.

== History ==
The home remained in the Taylor family until it was abandoned in 1978. In 1995, the Taylor House had come within a week of being demolished by the city until Aquilina Howell, granddaughter of the Taylors and a legendary community leader who went on to become the first woman assistant school superintendent in Leon County, turned to the Tallahassee Urban League, Inc. The Urban League purchased and restored the two-story structure to its original appearance; completing rehabilitation in 2001. Today, the home serves as the Taylor House Museum of Historic Frenchtown, owned and operated by the Tallahassee Urban League, Inc.

== References and external links ==
- Tallahassee Trust for Historic Preservation
