= Lively Technical Center =

Lively Technical College
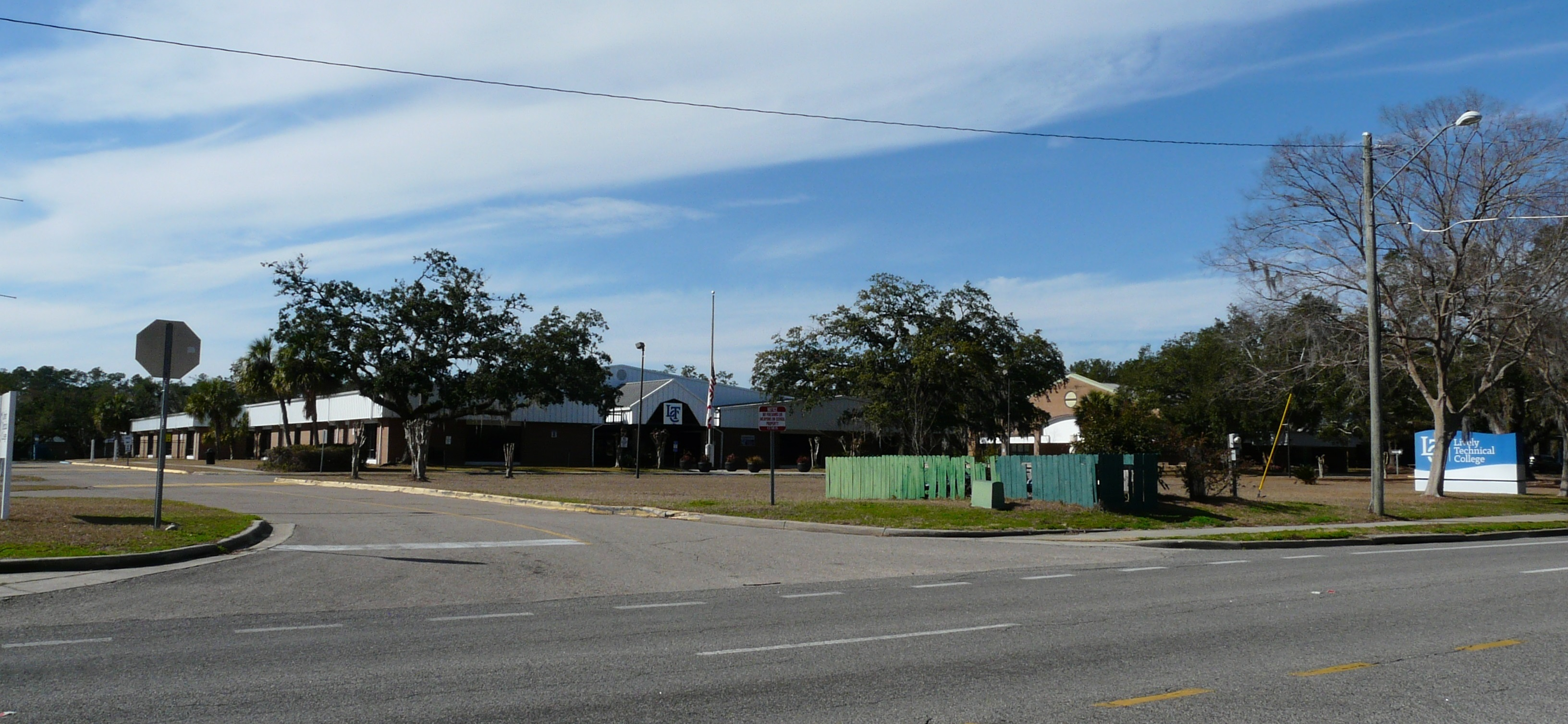

Location
- Tallahassee, Florida; United States; 30°26′55″N 84°20′21″W

Information
- School type: Post secondary Career and Technical Training
- Established: 1937
- Enrollment: 1322 (2015-16)
- Website: www.livelytech.com

Lively Technical College is a public technical training school for both adult and high school students, located in Tallahassee, Florida, United States. It occupies two sites, including the main campus at 500 Appleyard Drive, and the campuses at Tallahassee International Airport. The main campus on Appleyard is located adjacent to Tallahassee State College, but the two are separate institutions. Lively Tech is operated by the Leon County Schools district.

== History ==
The school was established in 1931 in the Lewis Lively Building. It relocated to Leon High School in 1937. An aviation maintenance program was established in 1942.
