= Aquilina Howell =

Aquilina C. Howell
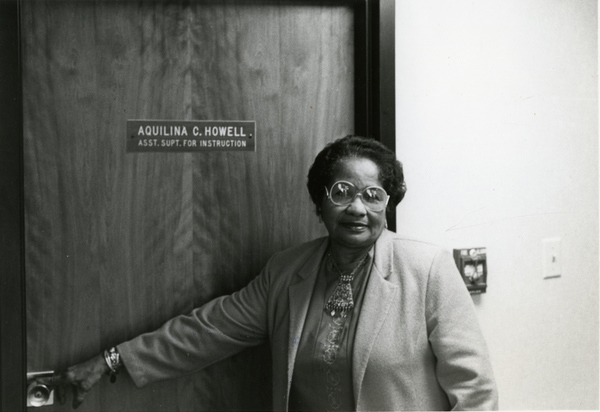

Assistant Superintendent of Leon County Schools
- In office 1981–1985

Personal details
- Born: May 3, 1917 Tallahassee, Florida, U.S.
- Died: January 13, 2000 (aged 82) Tallahassee, Florida, U.S.
- Spouse: Samuel Felton Howell
- Education: Florida A&M University

Aquilina Celia Casañas Howell (May 3, 1917 – January 13, 2000) was the first woman to serve as Assistant Superintendent of Leon County Schools, serving from 1981 until her retirement in 1985. Howell is credited as the driving force behind the peaceful desegregation of Tallahassee's public schools, using her consensus building skills to unite disparate groups.

== Early life and education ==
Aquilina Casañas was the eldest of four children born to Aurelio and Madeline Taylor Casañas, who resided at 442 West Georgia Street in Tallahassee, Florida. Her birth home, the Lewis and Lucretia Taylor House has been placed on the National Register of Historic Places.

She received her formal education in the public schools of Leon County, earning a BA Degree from Florida A&M University in 1938, and an MEd Degree from New York University in 1956. She completed further study at Boston University and the University of Chicago.

Casañas married Samuel Felton Howell on December 20, 1941. Their children were Carmen Felton Howell Ferguson, and the late Sonya Lena Howell Bradford (died 2014).

== Career ==
Aquilina Howell's career as a social studies, Spanish, and English teacher, guidance counselor, educational supervisor and administrator spanned over forty-three years where she provided outstanding leadership and guidance to students, teachers, and administrators. She settled disputes among school administrators, advised civic leaders, and negotiated with angry parents who did not want their children to attend a Black school, ultimately guiding the Tallahassee community through the often thorny path of school integration in the 1960s and 1970s. At her retirement, she held the honor of being the first female ever to be appointed to Assistant Superintendent in the Leon County School District.

== Legacy and honors ==
In appreciation for her resourcefulness in the school district and community at large, the Leon County School Board named and dedicated the Aquilina C. Howell Instructional Services Center in her honor on November 28, 1995.

Additionally, Howell, along with three other devoted citizens of the Tallahassee community, was honored in the naming of the Carter-Howell-Strong Park on February 20, 1993, where she was known for her leadership, commitment, and service to her birthplace, affectionately known as Frenchtown. On December 11, 2009, Aquilina Howell Street was dedicated to her memory.

== Death ==
Howell died on January 13, 2000, at Tallahassee Memorial Healthcare after an extended illness, which began with a stroke in 1995. She was 82.
