= Gene Atkins =

American football player (born 1964)

No. 28
- Position: Safety

Personal information
- Born: November 22, 1964 (age 61); Tallahassee, Florida, U.S.
- Listed height: 5 ft 11 in (1.80 m)
- Listed weight: 201 lb (91 kg)

Career information
- High school: James S. Rickards (Tallahassee, Florida)
- College: Florida A&M
- NFL draft: 1987: 7th round, 179th overall pick

Career history
- New Orleans Saints (1987–1993); Miami Dolphins (1994–1996)

Awards and highlights
- PFWA All-Rookie Team (1987)

Career NFL statistics
- Interceptions: 25
- Interception return yards: 348
- Sacks: 8
- Stats at Pro Football Reference

Gene Reynard Atkins (born November 22, 1964) is an American former professional football player who was a safety in the National Football League (NFL) for the New Orleans Saints and Miami Dolphins from 1987 to 1996. He was selected by the Saints in the seventh round of the 1987 NFL draft with the 179th overall pick. He played previously for Florida A&M and James S. Rickards High School, both in Tallahassee.

Pre-draft measurables
Height	Weight	Arm length	Hand span	40-yard dash	10-yard split	20-yard split	20-yard shuttle	Vertical jump	Broad jump	Bench press
5 ft 11 1/4 in (1.81 m)	191 lb (87 kg)	29 3/4 in (0.76 m)	9 in (0.23 m)	4.58 s	1.57 s	2.59 s	4.55 s	31.0 in (0.79 m)	10 ft 0 in (3.05 m)	14 reps
All values from NFL Combine

He is the father of Geno Atkins, former NFL defensive tackle. He was featured on HBO's Real Sports with Bryant Gumbel in a story about former football players who are suffering from head injuries that happened during their playing time. In the story, it was said that Atkins is suffering from the early stages of dementia. He was featured in the movie Head Games, which was released in 2012.
