= Station One School =

Coordinates: 30.43089°N 84.1156°W

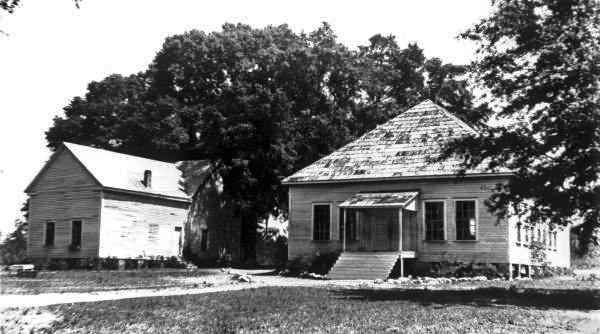
The two buildings that comprised Station One School. About 1900.

Station One School is a former school located in the hamlet of Chaires, Leon County, Florida.

The school was founded because the population of eastern Leon County was growing and there was no school closer than Tallahassee, 12 miles (19 km) away. The first mention of the school is in the 1870 school board minutes. It was for white students only.

In 1928, it was deemed "no longer suitable for the needs of the district". The school building had deteriorated and required a new roof. It did not have indoor plumbing and regularly flooded when there were heavy rains. Most importantly, the school was simply too small for the growing number of students. The county built a new school, Chaires School, with ”a coal heater, electricity, and a fresh well", as well as new desks and chairs. This school survives in 2018 as the Chaires Elementary School.

Although one newspaper report stated that the school closed in 1929 when the white students moved to The Chaires School, Station One School continued as a "colored" school.

In 1950, the school received its "first modern sanitary facilities including lavatories and toilets". In 1965, Station One School and two other Leon County schools were warned that they could lose their accreditation due to serious building deficiencies, including overcrowding.

In 1968, Leon County schools were integrated and the school closed. The land where the school had been located was put up for sale in 1970.

== See also ==
- Concord School (Miccosukee)
- "Colored" schools in Leon County
