= Buck Gurley =

American football player and coach (born 1978)

No. 90
- Position: Defensive tackle

Personal information
- Born: April 7, 1978 (age 48); Quincy, Florida, U.S.
- Listed height: 6 ft 3 in (1.91 m)
- Listed weight: 295 lb (134 kg)

Career information
- High school: Tallahassee (FL) Godby
- College: Florida
- NFL draft: 2001: undrafted

Career history

Playing
- Miami Dolphins (2001)*; Chicago Bears (2001)*; Tampa Bay Buccaneers (2002); Orlando Predators (2004–2005); Tampa Bay Storm (2006); Grand Rapids Rampage (2007)
- * Offseason or practice squad member only

Coaching
- Lake Mary Preparatory School (2009–present)

Awards and highlights
- Super Bowl champion (XXXVII)
- Stats at Pro Football Reference

Sheddrick Tobias "Buck" Gurley (born April 7, 1978) is a high school football coach and former American football defensive tackle. Gurley played college football for Florida. He played professionally in the NFL for the Miami Dolphins, Chicago Bears, and Tampa Bay Buccaneers and was part of the 2002 Buccaneers team that won Super Bowl XXXVII.

== Early life ==
Gurley was born in Quincy, Florida in 1978. He attended Amos P. Godby High School in Tallahassee, Florida, and he played high school football for the Godby Cougars. Gurley was considered one of the nation's top defensive line prospects, and was recognized as a consensus high school All-American, including first-team All-American honors from USA Today, in 1995.

== College career ==
Gurley accepted an athletic scholarship to attend the University of Florida in Gainesville, Florida, where he played for coach Steve Spurrier's Florida Gators football team from 1997 to 2000. As a redshirt senior in 2000, he was a member of the Gators' 2000 SEC Championship team. Gurley graduated from the University of Florida with a bachelor's degree in health and human performance in 2001.

== Professional career ==
Gurley was not selected during the 2001 NFL draft, and he signed with the Miami Dolphins as a free agent after the draft in April 2001. He was cut from the Dolphins after the preseason and later was signed to the Chicago Bears practice squad for several days during the regular season. He signed with the Tampa Bay Buccaneers on March 7, 2002. He played in eight games during the Buccaneers' Super Bowl XXXVII championship season.

== See also ==
- Florida Gators football, 1990–99
- History of the Tampa Bay Buccaneers
- List of University of Florida alumni
