= Amari Gainer =

American football player (born 2000)

No. 53 – Miami Dolphins
- Position: Linebacker
- Roster status: Practice squad

Personal information
- Born: June 22, 2000 (age 26); Tallahassee, Florida, U.S.
- Listed height: 6 ft 3 in (1.91 m)
- Listed weight: 240 lb (109 kg)

Career information
- High school: Chiles (Leon County, Florida)
- College: Florida State (2018–2022); North Carolina (2023)
- NFL draft: 2024: undrafted

Career history
- Las Vegas Raiders (2024); New England Patriots (2025)*; Miami Dolphins (2026–present)*
- * Offseason or practice squad member only

Career NFL statistics as of 2025
- Total tackles: 5
- Stats at Pro Football Reference

Amari Gainer (born June 22, 2000) is an American professional football linebacker for the Miami Dolphins of the National Football League (NFL). He played college football for the Florida State Seminoles and North Carolina Tar Heels.

== Early life ==
Gainer was born on June 22, 2000, and grew up in Tallahassee, Florida. His father was a wide receiver who played college football for the Florida State Seminoles. He attended Lawton Chiles High School where he was a football player, totaling 93 tackles, 24 tackles-for-loss (TFLs) and 12 sacks as a senior. He was a top-250 recruit and a four-star prospect, ultimately committing to play college football for Florida State, the school his father had attended.

== College career ==
As a true freshman at Florida State in 2018, Gainer suffered a broken foot and redshirted, having appeared in four games during the season. He became a starter in 2019. With 13 games played, and nine starts, in the 2019 season, he recorded 69 tackles, seven tackles-for-loss and 3.5 sacks. He then was the team leader with 65 tackles in 2020. Gainer recorded 59 tackles, 5.5 tackles-for-loss and a sack during the 2021 season, then posted 17 tackles, 1.5 tackles-for-loss and a sack in 2022.

Gainer transferred to the North Carolina Tar Heels for his final season in 2023, ending his stint at Florida State having made 210 tackles, 19 tackles-for-loss, six sacks and five forced fumbles. In his lone year with the Tar Heels, he appeared in all 13 games and posted 27 tackles, six tackles-for-loss and 2.5 sacks.

== Professional career ==
Pre-draft measurables
Height	Weight	Arm length	Hand span	Wingspan	40-yard dash	10-yard split	20-yard split	20-yard shuttle	Three-cone drill	Vertical jump	Broad jump
6 ft 3 in (1.91 m)	236 lb (107 kg)	32 1/2 in (0.83 m)	9 3/8 in (0.24 m)	6 ft 7 in (2.01 m)	4.60 s	1.65 s	2.60 s	4.32 s	7.09 s	33.5 in (0.85 m)	10 ft 3 in (3.12 m)
All values from Pro Day

=== Las Vegas Raiders ===
After going unselected in the 2024 NFL draft, Gainer signed with the Las Vegas Raiders as an undrafted free agent. He was also selected by the Arlington Renegades in the fifth round of the 2024 UFL draft on July 17.

On August 25, 2025, Gainer was waived by the Raiders.

=== New England Patriots ===
On December 17, 2025, Gainer signed with the New England Patriots' practice squad. On February 11, 2026, he signed a reserve/futures contract with New England. On August 30, Gainer was waived by the Patriots as a part of final roster cuts.

=== Miami Dolphins ===
On September 1, 2026, Gainer signed with the Miami Dolphins practice squad.
