= Tim Carter (defensive back) =

American football player (born 1978)

No. 41
- Position: Defensive back

Personal information
- Born: July 15, 1978 (age 48); Tallahassee, Florida
- Listed height: 6 ft 0 in (1.83 m)
- Listed weight: 183 lb (83 kg)

Career information
- High school: James S. Rickards
- College: Tulane
- NFL draft: 2001: undrafted

Career history
- New Orleans Saints (2001)*; Buffalo Bills (2001)*; New Orleans Saints (2001); Berlin Thunder (2002-2003); Winnipeg Blue Bombers (2003–2005)
- * Offseason or practice squad member only
- Stats at Pro Football Reference

Timothy Jerome Carter (born July 15, 1978) is an American former football defensive back. He played for the New Orleans Saints in 2001.

== Early life ==
Timothy Carter was born July 15, 1978, in Tallahassee, Florida. He attended Rickards High School in Tallahassee, where he ran track as well as played football. He graduated in 1996, then played football four years at Tulane University, including on the team's undefeated 1998 season. He graduated with a bachelor's degree in social science.

== Career ==
=== Playing ===
Carter was signed by the New Orleans Saints in 2001 and was on the practice roster for much of the season but was activated for the last two games. He subsequently played for the NFL-Europe team Berlin Thunder and the Canadian football team the Winnipeg Blue Bombers.

=== Coaching ===
In 2006, Carter became defensive staff assistant at East Carolina University. While at ECU, he earned a Master's degree in exercise science. He subsequently moved to Eastern Michigan University, becoming assistant football coach for the defensive backs and coaching alongside his brother, Antonio Carter, a former University of Alabama wide receiver. Carter taught Physical Education with Mike Turchan at North Cobb High School in Kennesaw, Georgia, from 2015 to 2017. Along with being friends, they currently collaborate in pursuit of making Phys Con the best class EVER in PE history. He proceeded to become a defensive back coach at Concord High School in Concord, North Carolina, from 2017 to 2020. He has since moved on to coach track and field and coach defensive backs at West Cabarrus High School, also in Concord.

== Personal life ==
Carter is married.
