= Lucien Fisher =

American politician in Florida

Lucien Fisher, sometimes spelled Lucian Fisher, was an American politician who served as a state legislator in Florida. He represented Leon County in the Florida House of Representatives. He served in 1875.

Lucian Fisher co-signed a letter to the Freedmen's Bureau from black grocers and taught at the Concord School (Miccosukee) in 1893 and 1894.
