= Concord School (Miccosukee) =

School in Florida, United States

Coordinates: 30.581361°N 84.042081°W

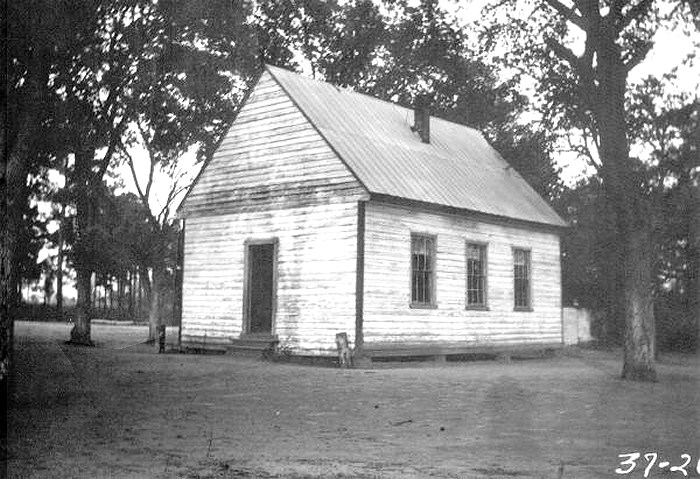
The Concord School c. 1925

Concord School was a school for African-American children built in 1897 in the hamlet of Miccosukee, in eastern Leon County, Florida.

== History ==
The earliest mention of Concord School was in the minutes of a school board meeting from 1878. It was mentioned that the teacher's salary was $20.00 per month. Schooling most likely began in the Miccosukee A.M.E. Church.

In 1893, two Miccosukee women, Fayette and Jennie Burned sold a half-acre of their land for $1.00 with the stipulation that a school house be constructed there. The first teachers on record were Lucien Fisher (1893—1894), A.B. Spencer (1895—1897). By 1912, Concord School had grown to be one of the five largest African-American rural schools in Leon County and was granted an assistant teacher. In the 1930s the school was enlarged and during 1968 was combined with the brick Miccosukee School with the name remaining Concord. The old one-room Concord schoolhouse was donated to the Tallahassee Junior Museum and later moved in 1974. The brick school was closed in 1985.

== Construction ==
The building is rectangular, vernacular wood framed architecture with one entrance and typical for a rural school in the South. It was unpainted and had neither electricity nor a well. It had two outhouses. The building was heated with a wood stove and lighting was provided by sunlight through the 6 long windows.

== See also ==
- Station One School
- "Colored" schools in Leon County
