= SAIL High School =

Public secondary school in Tallahassee, Florida, United States

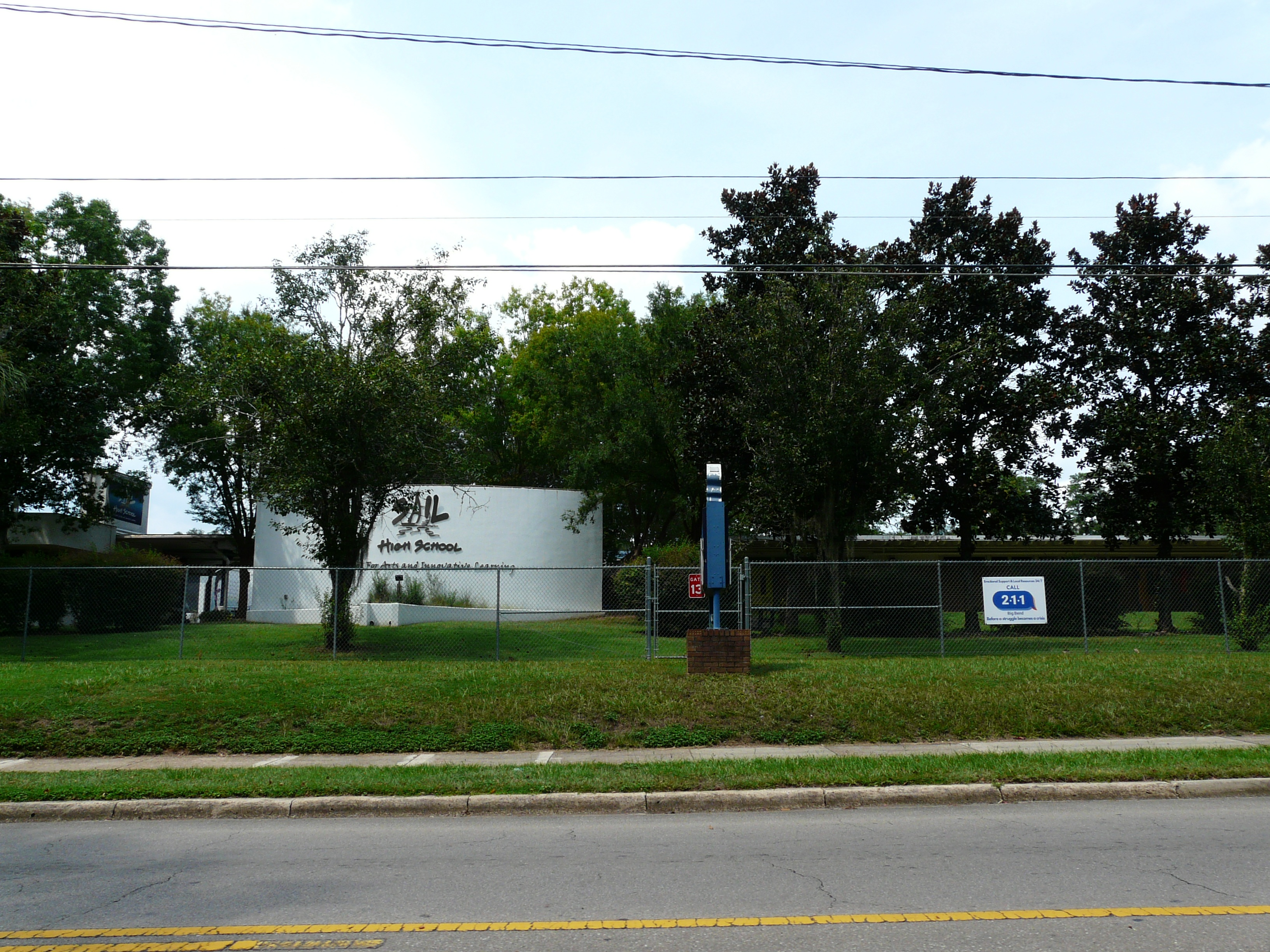

Location
- 2006 Jackson Bluff Road; Tallahassee, Florida; United States; 30°26′08″N 84°19′01″W

Information
- Type: Public secondary school
- Established: 1975
- School district: Leon County Schools
- Teaching staff: 20.13 (FTE)
- Grades: 9-12
- Enrollment: 384 (2022-23)
- Student to teacher ratio: 19.08
- Colors: Black and gold
- Nickname: Pirates
- Website: https://sail.leonschools.net/

SAIL High School, also known as School for Arts and Innovative Learning and formerly School for Applied Individualized Learning, is a public secondary school, serving grades 9-12 for the Leon County Schools in Tallahassee, Florida. A magnet school, it has a focus on arts and applied humanities.

== Programs and magnet school status ==
The school is a magnet school, with a focus on arts and applied humanities and an individualized approach to education. The school is also known for its extracurricular robotics program. The school also has a juggling program, which is credited as the inspiration for the introductory juggling course held at Appalachian State University.

The school has an open admissions policy, in which the names of interested students are placed on a waiting list until a seat becomes available.

During the Spring term of each school year, traditional classes are suspended for one week, during which students take workshop courses of their choice, known as intensives. Intensives can include either group trips to other U.S. states or territories (featuring activities such as camping and visiting national parks, including in such locations as Puerto Rico) or on-campus activities (such as film studies discussions, community volunteering, and technology projects). Some students (with special permission) can design their own intensive and report back on their experiences.

== History ==
SAIL High School was founded in 1975 as the Alternative Learning Center. By 1978, the school had changed its name to the School for Applied Individualized Learning, and by 1981, the school had gained full accreditation. It was the first alternative high school in Florida to earn full academic accreditation status. As of 1984, SAIL High School had approximately 140 students. In the early 1990s, SAIL High School served as a magnet school for environmental science. In 1990, Al Gore visited the school to express his support for environmental education programs.

Current Leon County School Board member Rosanne Wood was SAIL's longest-serving Principal. Wood served from 1978 to 2010, replacing a previous principal who had moved to Saudi Arabia. During her time as principal, Wood advocated for an approach to education rooted in activism and direct democracy, and conceptualized SAIL as serving the unmet needs of students who felt disenfranchised by other public schools. She was later succeeded by Dave Crandall and subsequently by Tiffany Williams (nee Thomas), who was the first black woman to serve as principal of SAIL. In 2021, Matt Roberson was the school's principal. Then in 2024 he was then promoted to the district to supervise LCS's CTE programs.

From 1975 to 2007, the school was located at the former Old Lincoln High School campus. Due to the aging infrastructure, a need to accommodate a growing student population, and the desire to offer more state of the art resources for students & staff, SAIL was moved to its current campus, located at the site of a former elementary school on Jackson Bluff Road. The current location features updated electronic equipment, a black box theatre, a photography lab, and a cafeteria with a higher occupational capacity than that at the prior location. In 2016, the school added a new gymnasium.

As of April 26, 2022, the Leon County School Board had unanimously voted to demolish the three principal buildings belonging to SAIL's original Macomb Street campus, citing environmental concerns such as the presence of asbetos, which rendered the buildings non-reusable. The demolition took place later that same year.

== Student life, activities, and events ==
SAIL High School has hosted a number of guest speakers and performers at events exclusive to SAIL students, faculty, and staff. These have included film directors and sound artists, as well as writers, musicians, and local elected officials. Notable guests have included Reggae artist Pato Banton, who has performed at the school.

SAIL operates on block scheduling, which allows for students to focus on three classes per day instead of the traditional six. This provides more time for discussions, project-based learning, and teacher-student interaction. Students also used to be able to attend an optional 1st period that meets every school day for the traditional class time, but this was discontinued.

== Recognition, statistics, and awards ==
SAIL has an Advanced Placement participation rate of 21%. In 2011, SAIL High School received the College Board's first national award for innovation in the arts. In 2017, SAIL High School received a Bronze Medal designation for state exam performance from the U.S. News Best High School Rankings.

As of 2021, more than one SAIL High School student had received a scholarship from LeMoyne Arts in recognition of their creative work.

== Alumni ==
A 501c(3) nonprofit exists in the form of the SAIL High School Foundation, promoting alumni involvement in SAIL's future direction.

Notable SAIL alumni include the fantasy author Jesse Bullington (also published as Alex Marshall) and Katie McTigue, the singer of anti-folk band Pacing.
