= James S. Rickards High School =

Location
- 3013 Jim Lee Road; Tallahassee, Florida 32301; United States; 30°24′26″N 84°15′46″W

Information
- Type: Public coeducational high school
- Motto: New heights and rising!
- Established: 1960
- School district: Leon County Schools
- Principal: Douglas Cook
- Staff: 66.60 (FTE)
- Grades: 9–12
- Enrollment: 1,575 (2023-2024)
- Student to teacher ratio: 23.65
- Colors: Blue and gold
- Team name: Raiders
- Website: School website

James S. Rickards High School is a public high school in Tallahassee, Florida, United States. It is a part of Leon County Schools. The first graduating class was in 1966. The school's mascot, originally the Rickards Redskins, was changed to the Rickards Raiders in 2000 because of controversy over the racial connotations of the term "redskin". The school colors are blue and gold.

== Programs ==
Rickards has hosted an International Baccalaureate program since 1994. This program is coordinated by Dr. Joe Williams.

Alumni Village, the designated Florida State University housing unit for FSU students with children, was zoned to Rickards High School prior to its closure.

== Campus ==
In 2018, Leon County Schools began a $35 million renovation of Rickards' campus, including new athletic fields and academic buildings.

== School performance ==
In 2009, Rickards earned a "D" as its school performance grade, making it the second-lowest ranking high school in the district. This was lower than in 2008 and 2007, when the school had earned "C"s. In 2010, Rickards earned an "A" as its school performance grade for the first time. The celebration was accompanied by a pep rally.

== Extracurricular activities ==
=== Pangaea ===
Every year, James S. Rickards High School puts on a multicultural show called Pangaea. In recent years, the show has become more and more successful. Pangaea is a completely student-run event that showcases the various talents and cultures of the school through song, dance, and fashion from around the world.

=== Achievements in mathematics ===
The members of the Rickards Math Team have participated in national mathematics competitions such as the American Mathematics Competition, the American Invitational Mathematics Examination, the United States of America Mathematical Olympiad, the Princeton University Math Competition, the Harvard-MIT Math Tournament, and the American Regions Math League. Three members of Rickards' Math Team have served as the captains of the state math teams that competed at ARML, HMMT, and PUMaC. The Math Team has also produced multiple USAMO qualifiers and attendees to the Mathematical Olympiad Summer Program. None of them have yet to make it to the Carnegie Mellon program. They were the runners-up at the 2010 National Mu Alpha Theta Convention in Washington, D.C.

=== Band ===
James S. Rickards High has a marching band known for their high-stepping style, or "90 degree marching", with over 100 members including auxiliary. They performed at the Orange Bowl in Miami in 2007 and received thirteen trophies and three plaques, winning all first place awards in the AA division. Due to those awards, they performed during the pre-game events at the Orange Bowl. The band appeared as a cameo in the 2008 HBO movie Recount.

=== Athletics ===
- Boys' sports
  - Basketball
  - Baseball
  - Cross country
  - Football (Varsity and Junior Varsity)
  - Golf
  - Lacrosse
  - Soccer
  - Swimming and diving
  - Track and field
  - Tennis
  - Weightlifting
  - Wrestling
- Girls' sports
  - Basketball
  - Cheerleading
  - Cross country
  - Dance team
  - Flag football
  - Golf
  - Soccer
  - Softball
  - Swimming and diving
  - Tennis
  - Track and field
  - Volleyball
  - Weightlifting

== Notable alumni ==
- Gene Atkins - professional football player
- Tim Carter - professional football player with the New Orleans Saints
- Stephen Denmark - professional football player
- Bethany Ehlmann - planetary scientist
- Corey Fuller - professional football player and coach
- William Gay - professional football player with the Pittsburgh Steelers
- Burgess Owens (Class of 1969) - former championship winning professional football and current Republican representative of Utah's 4th congressional district who is the leader of a non-profit dedicated to helping troubled and incarcerated youth
- Elton Patterson - professional football player
- Kent Richardson - professional football player
- Kolby Smith - professional football player; running back with the Kansas City Chiefs
- Mallex Smith - professional baseball player with the Tampa Bay Rays
- stic.man - rapper, activist, and author; member of dead prez
- T-Pain - rapper, singer, songwriter, and record producer
- Travis Walker - International Boxing Association heavyweight champion
- Wally Williams - professional football player
- Darializa Avila Chevalier - Congressional candidate for NY-13, only challenger to outraise an incumbent Congressperson Q1 2026

== Notable staff ==
- Rudy Hubbard - football coach at the school; former college football player and coach
