= Chaires School =

School in Florida, United States

Coordinates: 30.4359°N 84.1225°W

Chaires Elementary School
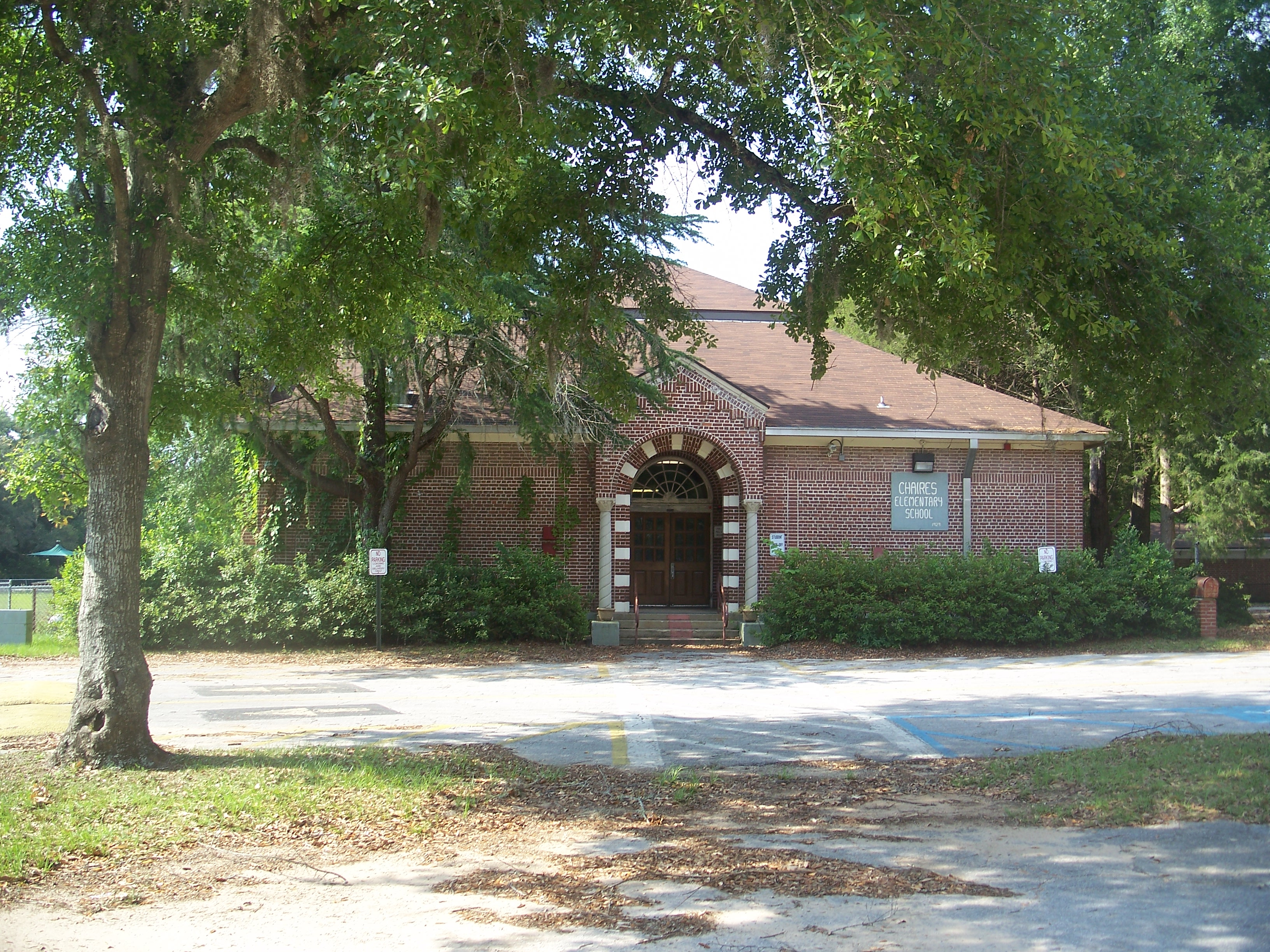
- Old Chaires School, built 1929 (Little Chaires)
- 4774 Chaires Cross Road, Tallahassee, Florida 32317; United States

Information
- Former name: Chaires School
- Principal: Richard Holmes
- Enrollment: 515
- Campus size: 40 acres
- Colors: Purple and Gold
- Team name: Panthers

Chaires Elementary School, formerly The Chaires School, is an elementary school located in the unincorporated community of Chaires, Florida, in eastern Leon County. Under the name Station One School, it appeared in Leon County School Board minutes in the 1870s. At that time, it served grades 1–10. It was racially segregated and served only white students.

== The Chaires School ==
By 1928, the original building was deemed no longer suitable for the white students; it was too small for the growing population and needed extensive renovation. In addition, the school regularly flooded during heavy rains.

A new school opened in 1929, on a campus of 6 acres (24,000 m^{2}). It had a coal heater, electricity, and a fresh well. Station One was turned over to the blacks in the community. The school at that time went up to the 11th grade. The grade level has fluctuated although it was never accredited above the junior high level.

An addition to the building was built in 1948. The school became integrated in 1967, when the Station One School closed. The school was redesignated as Chaires Elementary School serving only grades K-5. In the 1980s student numbers increased.

By mid 1985, the Leon County Courts had several construction permits being pulled to start constructing nearly a dozen large acer neighborhoods in eastern Leon County. These neighborhoods would add an additional 300-400 students to Chaires. Immediately the Leon County School Board Members began searching for land to construct a new state of the art school facility that would be capable of holding approximately 700 students. In the fall of 1985 the Leon County School Board had announced plans to construct a new elementary school some 6 miles northwest of Chaires, off of Buck Lake Road near the then stop sign at County Road 1553 (Now Pedrick Road). This plan to relocate the school away from the rural community of Chaires and place it in an area that was expected to become a very populated suburban sprawl within the next five years was met with severe backlash from both community members and school teachers. The school board then began a search for land closer to the Chaires Community. In January 1986 for nearly $130,000 the board purchased the 27 acers of farmland immediately to the west of the existing Chaires School.

== The New Chaires Elementary ==
The new Chaires Elementary facility opened in August 1987. The new school received the nickname "Big Chaires" with "Little Chaires" being the former building next door. The new facility opened with a total student capacity of 720. With the school now able to accommodate more students, the school board expanded the attendance zone for Chaires. The new attendance zone stretched some 7 miles south to Tram Road, 23 miles north to the FL/GA State Line and 7 miles west up Perry Highway (Now Apalachee Parkway). Due to the new and much larger attendance zone covering nearly all of the eastern portion of Leon County, the new Chaires school opened at 89% capacity.

The following 1988-1989 school year, student enrollment had already increased by 130 students to a total of 780. In the fall of 1989, Buck Lake Elementary opened its doors on the land that was originally slated for Chaires. While board members were hopeful that Buck Lake would help level enrollment at Chaires, this plan was unsuccessful.

During the summer of 1991, Chaires was selected as one of only a few sites in the district to offer Pre-Kindergarten classes. This meant that students outside of the existing attendance zone would attend Chaires for their Pre-K years. For the 1991-1992 school year, 'Little Chaires' became the home of the several Pre-K classes consisting of any Pre-K eligible student who lived east of Capital Circle between Tram Road and Centerville Road. This contributed to Chaires' rapidly growing student population.

By the fall of 1995, Chaires had some 900 students, using both Chaires school buildings and nearly 25 portable classrooms. In 1996, the school was "capped" which required all newly enrolling students to catch a bus from Chaires to other nearby elementary schools that could better accommodate additional students. Despite this, in 1998 Chaires reached the status of the largest elementary school in the district, with 1000 students.

During 1999, the Leon County School District began plans to construct a new elementary school in the northeast portion of Leon County, the goal for this new school would be to alleviate extreme crowding in area schools. The school was originally slated to open in the fall of 2000.

== 2000 to Present ==
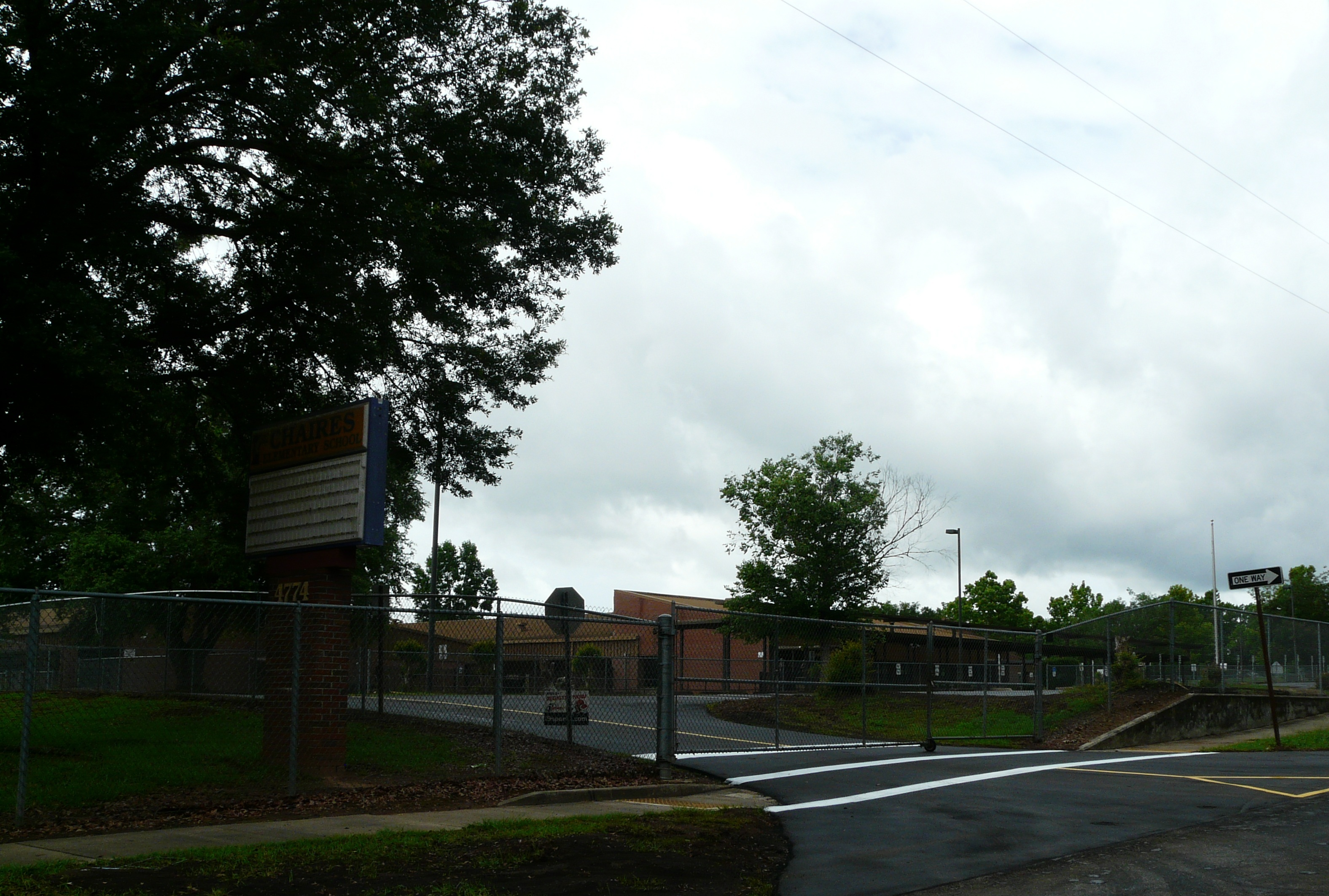
The new Chaires Elementary School

In August 2001, Roberts Elementary opened 8 miles north of Chaires. Roberts had been planned primarily to relieve over crowdedness at Chaires and a few other area schools that were becoming overcrowded due to taking on hundreds of bussed Chaires students. With the opening of Roberts the entire northern portion of the Chaires attendance zone was nearly cut in half, no longer extending over 20 miles north. This resulted in Chaires decreasing from 990 students to 730, a number that was still deemed over capacity.

In the years following the opening of Roberts, Big Chaires seemed to be receiving a fresh start. The total enrollment had flat lined at approximately 730 students, there was a new principal, and academically Chaires seemed to be performing well. Year after year in the 2000s Chaires received an 'A' letter grade from the state Department of Education. In addition, overall student assessment achievement scores were ranking Chaires within the top 5 elementary schools in Leon County. Because of this, enrolment increased. By 2007, Chaires saw its overall enrollment topping the high 700s and into the low 800s.

Concerned that Chaires would again become overcrowded, the Leon County School Board approved a new school to open in August 2008. With a new elementary school now taking the majority of the southern tip of the Chaires attendance zone, the overall student population reduced by some 300 students. This placed Chaires at a 2008-2009 enrollment of 570 students, the smallest the new school had been in its 21 years of operation.

In the years to come, the schools enrollment would drop and ultimately flat line, never exceeding 540 students. This resulting in the school not having to occupy Little Chaires for classroom space, or use any portable classrooms or for many years, even have to hire new faculty and staff members. It was now, some nearly thirty years later, that Big Chaires would become a small rural community school as it had been prior to the need for a new bigger facility.

Currently Chaires has some 470 students and approximately 50 staff members. As of 2024, the principal is Richard "Mike" Holmes.

== Chaires Principals ==
Old Chaires

- V. L. Townsend, 1929-1930

- C. L. Clark, 1930-1936 (Died: December 1936)

- Virgil Strickland, 1937-1941

- Phillip Covington, 1941-1944

- Mabel Hodgson-Hamilton, 1944-1949

- Joe Camp, 1949-1950

- C. E. Duval, 1950-1953 (Died: Spring 1953)

- Ethel Ruff, Interim: Spring 1953

- C. Lee Moon, 1953-1956

- James M. Gilchrist, 1956-1959

- Floyd Davis, 1959-1961

- Roger Englert, 1961-1966

- Helen Nistendirk, 1966-1973

- Roberta Folker, 1973-1987

New Chaires

- Dr. Jeff Patterson, 1987-2001

- Christine Moss, 2001-2008

- Michele Prescott, 2008-2021

- Richard Holmes, 2021–Present
