= Leon High School =

Location
- 550 East Tennessee Street; Tallahassee, Florida 32308; United States

Information
- Type: Public coeducational secondary
- Established: 1831; 195 years ago
- School district: Leon County Schools
- Principal: Scotty Crowe
- Staff: 80.60 (FTE)
- Grades: 9–12
- Enrollment: 1,923 (2023-2024)
- Student to teacher ratio: 23.86
- Colors: Red and white
- Mascot: Leo the Lion
- Newspaper
- Yearbook: The Lion's Tale
- Website: School website
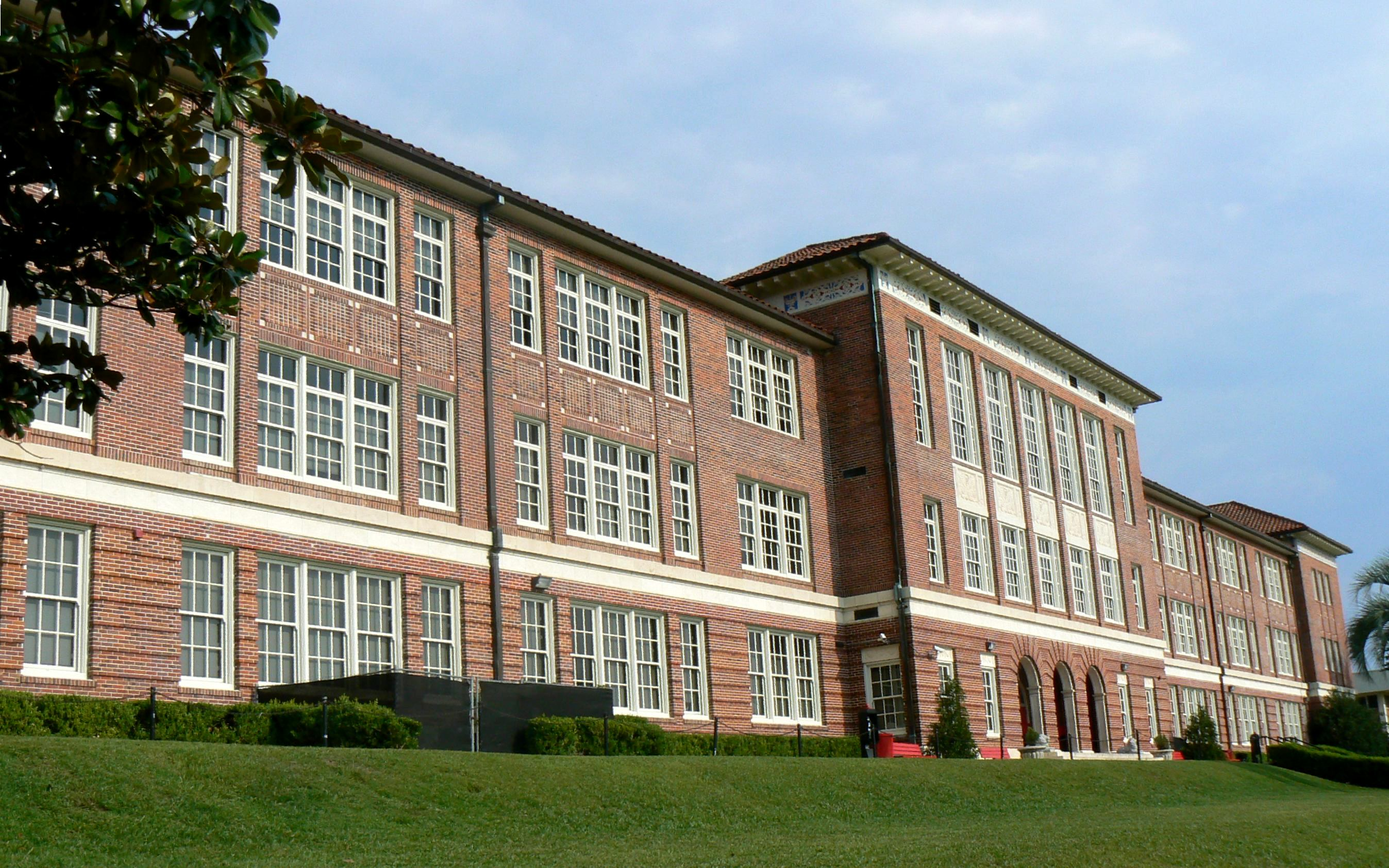
- Leon High School in 2008
- Leon High School
- U.S. National Register of Historic Places
- Location within Florida Location within the United States
- Coordinates: 30°26′43″N 84°16′32″W
- Architect: T.A. Monk, M. Leo Elliot
- Architectural style: Mission/Spanish Revival
- NRHP reference No.: 93000982
- Added to NRHP: September 21, 1993

Leon High School is a public high school in Tallahassee, Florida, United States. It is the oldest public high school in the state, and is a part of the Leon County Schools system.

== History ==
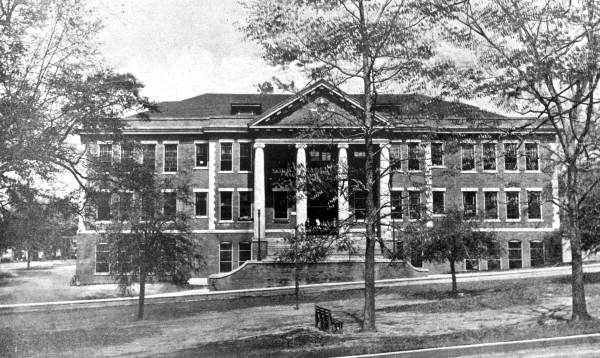
Leon High School 1910

Leon High School is one of the oldest high schools in the country. It was founded 14 years before Florida became a state. It was founded as Leon Academies in 1831 in Tallahassee, Leon County, and helped shape education in the capital city. In 1903 it became the Leon County Graded and High School, which was originally set as the first public high school in Florida, on the corner of Duval, Tennessee and Bronough Streets.

In 1911, a need for more room for the growing student population led to the construction of a second Leon High School where the LeRoy Collins Public Library now stands.

The current building at 550 East Tennessee Street was built in controversy. Built by the Works Progress Administration (WPA) for $500,000, citizens thought the school was too expensive, too far out of town and much too big with its three stories.

The architect was M. Leo Elliott, designer of many public buildings of merit, including the Old Jail on East Gaines Street in Tallahassee. The builder was Thomas Monk, who built dozens of high schools and commercial buildings around Florida, including the Monk Building in downtown Bradenton, renovated in 2000. In Tallahassee, Monk also built the Mayo Building in the Capital area, and a house in Los Robles for his daughter and son-in-law.

Until school integration and the closure of Leon County's black high school, Old Lincoln High School, in 1967, Leon High School was for whites only. The Florida Constitution of 1885 mandated school segregation. In 1954, the United States Supreme Court decided the case of Brown v. Board of Education, which was not implemented in Leon County, Florida, until 1969. Effective January 7, 1969, the Florida Constitution of 1885 was superseded by a new Florida Constitution, which does not contain any requirement for racial segregation. In 2019, the enrollment at Leon High was 33% black.

== Athletics ==
Leon High School's mascot is the Lion, and their colors are red and white, with black also appearing on some uniforms, such as soccer. They were one of the 29 original member schools of the FHSAA. They have been a member of the Association since it formed in 1920. Leon has teams in the following FHSAA sports:

- Basketball (boys' and girls')
- Baseball (boys)
  - State champions - 1940, 1944, 1951, 1998
- Competitive cheer (girls') - 2016 2A State Runner-up; 2017 Regional Champion, 2017 Nationals 7th place
- Cross country (boys' and girls')
  - Boys' state champions - 1969, 2007, 2008, 2009
  - Girls' state champions - 1977, 1978, 1986, 1987, 1988
- Flag football (girls')
  - State Champions - 2007, 2008 State Runner-up 2009
- Football (boys')
  - State champions - 1969, 1974
- Golf (boys' and girls')
- Lacrosse (boys')
- Soccer (boys' and girls')
  - Boys' state champions - 1988
- Softball (girls')
- Swimming and diving (boys' and girls')
- Track and field (boys' and girls')
- Tennis (boys' and girls')
- Volleyball (girls')
  - State champions - 2011
  - State champions - 2019
- Weightlifting (boys' and girls')
- Wrestling (boys')
  - State champions (Individual) - 2016 Gabriel Beyer (285lb)

== Notable alumni ==
- Karl Allen (Class of 1949), neo-Nazi
- Loranne Ausley, state representative (Class of 1981)
- Ricky Carmichael, motocross national champion; three-time X-Games gold medalist
- LeRoy Collins, governor of Florida (Class of 1927)
- Mary Call Darby Collins, Florida's First Lady
- R. Clarke Cooper, U.S. assistant secretary of state for Political-Military Affairs
- Brad Culpepper, Tampa Bay Buccaneer; competitor on Survivor (Class of 1987)
- Maddy Curley, actress (Class of 2000)
- Tommy Curtis, 1969 Florida Prep/High School Basketball Player of the Year (Class of 1969)
- Faye Dunaway, actress (Class of 1958)
- Gwen Graham, member of U.S. House of Representatives, Florida's 2nd district (Class of 1980)
- Tony Hale, actor (Class of 1988)
- Cheryl Hines, actress (Class of 1983)
- Doug Jennings, MLB player (Oakland Athletics, Chicago Cubs) (Class of 1982)
- Allison Miller, actress
- Fondren Mitchell, American football player
- Michel Oksenberg, China scholar, member of National Security Council (Class of 1956)
- Tony Robinson, NFL quarterback (Class of 1982)
- Wyatt Sexton, Florida State University quarterback (Class of 2002)
- Jeff Shaara, New York Times bestselling author (Class of 1970)
- Sonny Shroyer, actor
- E. Lee Spence, underwater archaeologist (Class of 1966)
- George Tabb, punk rock guitarist and songwriter, author, television host
- Tamarick Vanover, football player (Florida State Seminoles, NFL)
- Bert Yancey, professional golfer (Class of 1956)
- Carrie Englert Zimmerman, 1976 United States gymnastics champion in floor exercise and balance beam, member of 1976 U.S. Olympic team
