= Old Lincoln High School =

Lincoln High School

Location
- Tallahassee, Florida; United States
- 30.44920°N 84.28785°W

Information
- Type: Public, segregated
- Established: 1869
- Closed: 1969
- Colors: Royal Blue and White
- Mascot: Tigers
- Last updated: 29 December 2017

Lincoln High School, also known as Lincoln Academy, was a high school for African Americans in Tallahassee, Florida, United States. It is commonly referred to as "Historic Lincoln High School" or "Old Lincoln". The only remaining connection with Leon County's current (and distant) Lincoln High School is its name.

== History ==
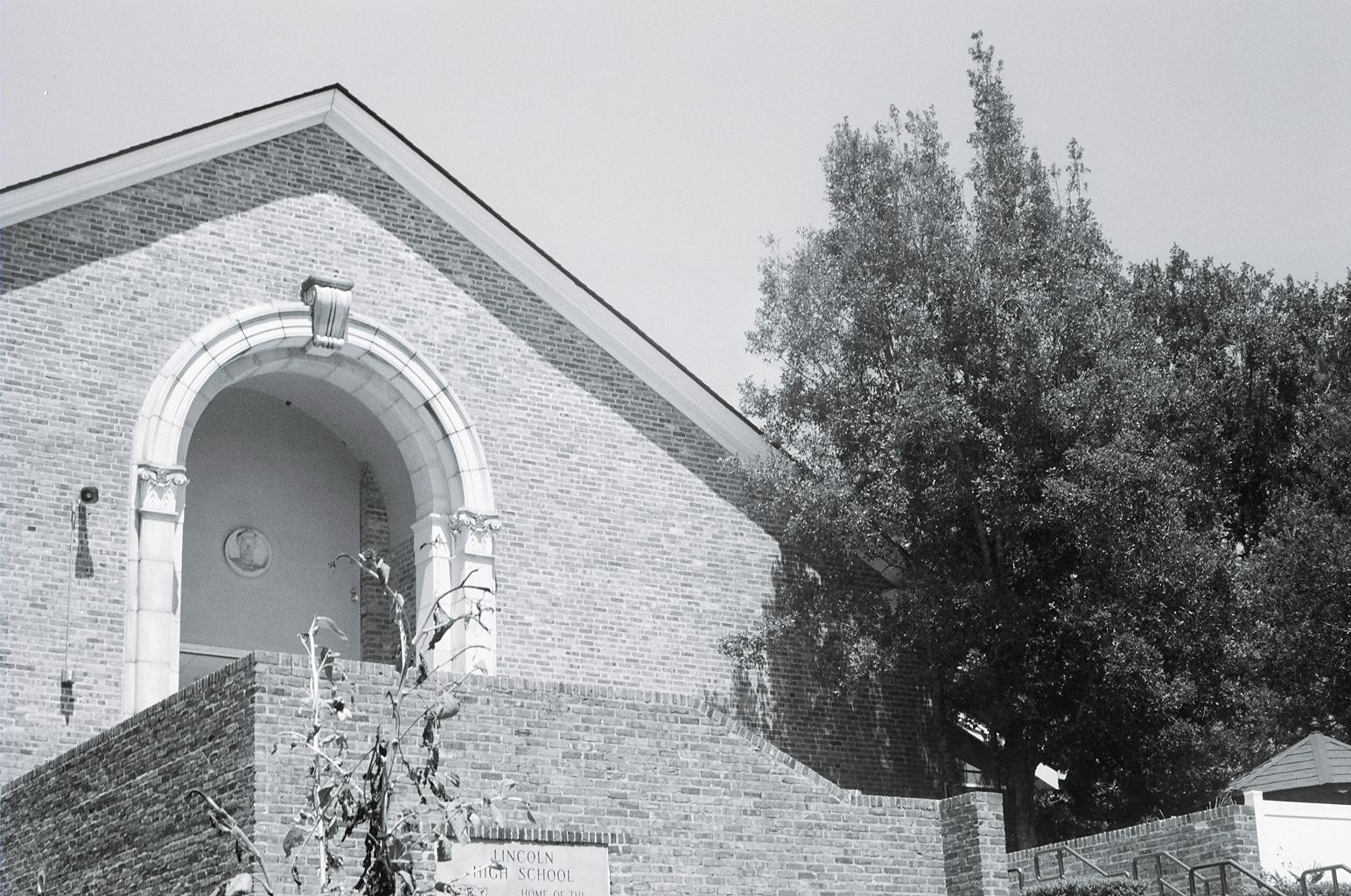

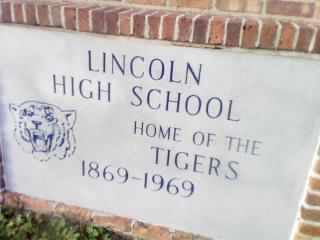

=== Founding and early years ===
Lincoln Academy opened in 1869 during Reconstruction as the first school for African Americans in Leon County, Florida. It was built by the Freedmen's Bureau. At one point it was one of only three schools in the state that provided high school to colored students. it was one of the best-equipped schools in the state and had an enrollment of 250.

Its first location was at Copeland and Lafayette Streets, two blocks south of West Florida Seminary, FSU's predecessor. In 1872 fire destroyed the school. It was not rebuilt until 1876, when it reopened in a new building on the west side of Copeland Streets, at Park Avenue, on what is today the FSU campus. It remained there until 1906, when its final building at Brevard and Macomb Streets was constructed. At that point, Florida State College for Women acquired its former building and used it as a music building and gymnasium. It was torn down about 1965.

From 1887 to 1889 the predecessor of Florida A&M University, the State Normal College for Colored Students, used its facilities. In 1889 it moved to a new adjacent building. In 1891 it moved to its current location, about one mile south.

=== Its final home, on Brevard Street ===
Its rival schools were FAMU High School and Griffin High School, which is now Griffin Middle. Because it was too crowded, some black students went to Bond School (what we now know as Bond Elementary) for grades 1 through 9.

At night, the school offered vocational classes such as tailoring, cosmetology (taught by Ms. Harris), welding, Spanish (Ms. Rainey), and nursing. It was a member of the Florida Interscholastic Athletic Association.

John G. Riley was the first African-American to become principal of a Leon County School, when he served as principal of Lincoln Academy, the predecessor to Lincoln High School. In the same area where Lincoln was located was the Lincoln Nursery Center, for children who were not ready for the first grade.

After integration, Lincoln High was closed down and Griffin Middle School was given the Tiger mascot. Lincoln's last two classes were transferred to Griffin; hence the school being renamed Lincoln-Griffin High. Students in the classes of 1968 and 1969 finished from Lincoln-Griffin High.

Lincoln has been through three different stages and four buildings. It was first located on Copeland Street, then moved to land that was later sold to Florida State University. The city fire department, because of "insufficient hoses", did not respond to the fire that destroyed the Lincoln Academy in 1872. It then moved to its final location on Brevard and Macomb Streets.

The school closed in 1967–68 when Leon County Schools were integrated.

The Class of 1967 was the last class to graduate as Lincoln High School Tigers.

Lincoln High School was named after President Abraham Lincoln, and possibly also a small section of Tallahassee called Lincoln Heights, an area which was later destroyed. The city extended Frenchtown, so now the area is called Historic Frenchtown. It was owned by a black couple who later sold the school to Leon County Schools for $150 in 1876.

Parts of the Old Lincoln such as the gym and some other vocational buildings were torn down. The main structure that still stands on the grounds is known as the Lincoln Neighborhood Center, and houses various social services. There is also the Lincoln Room Museum, where people can experience Old Lincoln and view some of the artifacts of the school. The original plaque that is engraved in the building remains, inscribed "Lincoln High School Home of the Tigers." The area where the gymnasium is located on campus now was once the school's auditorium, and the stage still remains the same.

On May 14, 1992, "Old Lincoln" was officially recognized as an historical site by the Historic Preservation Society Florida Heritage Foundation and the Historic Tallahassee Preservation Board. A significant portion of the campus was used as the campus for SAIL High School from 1975 until 2007, when the SAIL High School campus relocated.

== Colors and mascot ==
The school's colors are royal blue and white. Their mascot is the Tiger.

== Notable alumni ==
- Wally Amos
- Carrie P. Meek

== See also ==
- History of Tallahassee, Florida - Black history
- Old Dillard High School (Ft. Lauderdale)
