= List of people from Tallahassee, Florida =

This is a list of notable people who were either born or raised, or have lived for a significant period of time in the Tallahassee, Florida metropolitan area.

== Academics, education, and research ==
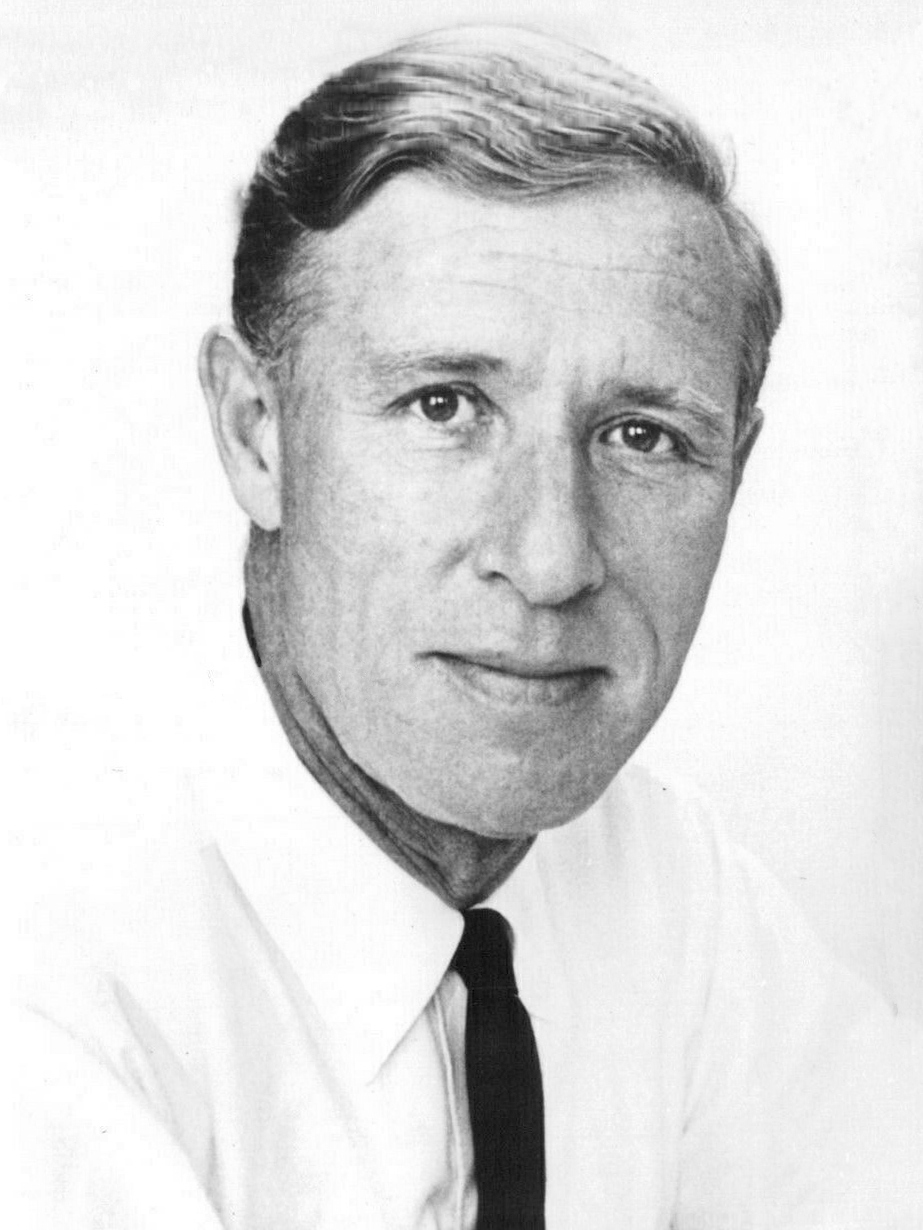
Konrad Emil Bloch, Nobel-winning biochemist

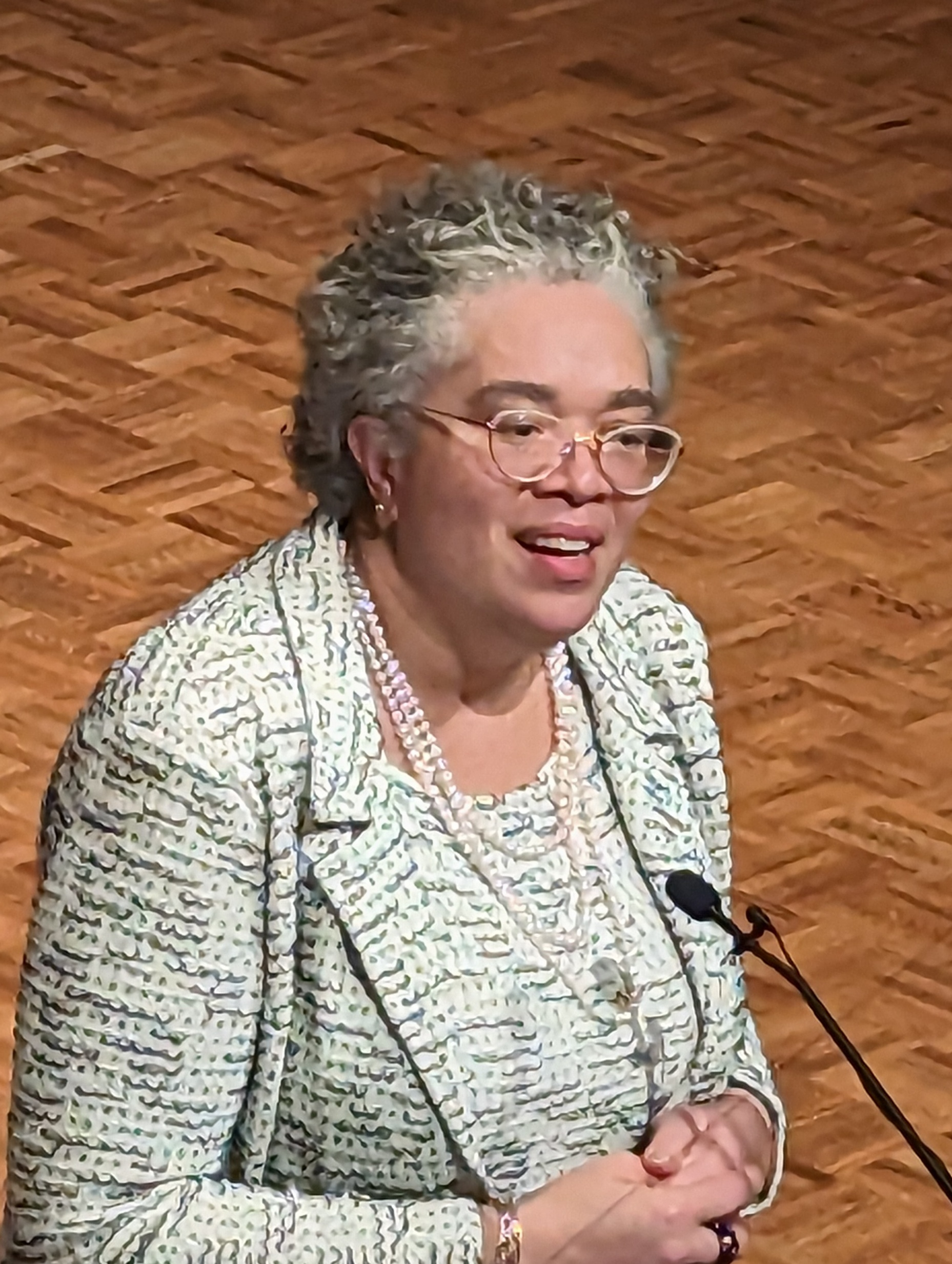
G. Gabrielle Starr, president of Pomona College

- Roy Baumeister – psychologist of self-control
- Konrad E. Bloch – Nobel Prize-winning biochemist, who helped learn about the functioning of cholesterol
- Mark Frederick Boyd – malariologist and writer
- James M. Buchanan – winner of Nobel Prize in economics
- Talbot "Sandy" D'Alemberte – attorney, civil-rights activist, former dean of the Florida State University Law School, former president of Florida State University, president of the American Bar Association and the American Judicature Society
- Paul Dirac – Nobel Prize-winning physicist whose theories predicted antimatter
- Sylvia Earle – former chief scientist for the U.S. National Oceanic and Atmospheric Administration
- Neil Frank – former director of the National Hurricane Center
- Fred Gainous – former president of Florida A & M University, 2002–2004; former chancellor of the Alabama College System's Department of Postsecondary Education; associate vice president of St. Petersburg College
- Thelma Thurston Gorham – American journalist, organization leader, activist.
- Robert A. Holton – chemist and inventor of Taxol
- Tim Howard – president and founder of Cambridge Graduate University international, former head of doctorate program of Law & Policy at Northeastern University, former assistant attorney general of Florida
- Sir Harold Kroto – Nobel Prize-winning chemist who helped discover fullerenes
- Max Mayfield – former director of the National Hurricane Center
- Alfred Mele – philosopher of free will
- Robert S. Mulliken – physicist and chemist who won both the Priestley Medal and the Nobel Prize
- Michel Oksenberg – China scholar, member of National Security Council
- X. William Proenza – former director of the National Hurricane Center
- Michael Ruse – philosopher, historian of science
- Robert Schrieffer – Nobel Laureate, BCS Theory of Superconductivity
- E. Lee Spence – underwater archeologist
- G. Gabrielle Starr – president of Pomona College
- Glayde Whitney – geneticist

=== Space exploration ===
- Carolyn S. Griner – former director of the NASA Marshall Space Flight Center
- Winston E. Scott – NASA astronaut
- Norman Thagard – NASA astronaut; flew on three different U.S. Space Shuttles, and on one Russian mission to the Mir space station

== Authors ==
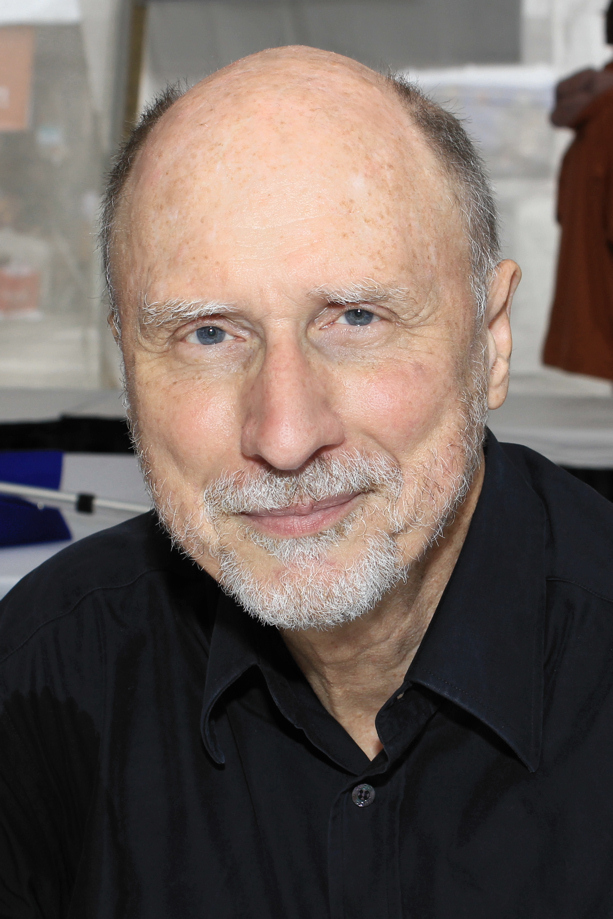
Robert Olen Butler, Pulitzer-winning author

- Jesse Bullington – fantasy novelist; also published as Alex Marshall
- Robert Olen Butler – Pulitzer Prize-winning author for A Good Scent from a Strange Mountain (fiction)
- Doug Marlette – Pulitzer Prize-winning cartoonist
- Leora Bettison Robinson (1840–1914) – author, educator
- Jeff Shaara – New York Times bestselling author of historical fiction
- Michael Shaara – Pulitzer Prize-winning author (for The Killer Angels)
- Jeff VanderMeer – World Fantasy Award-winning author (for the novella The Transformation of Martin Lake)

== Aviation ==
- Jerrie Mock – aviator and first woman to fly around the world solo

== Business ==
- Wally Amos – founder of the "Famous Amos" chocolate chip cookie brand; actor
- Eugene Figg – engineer for such bridges as Sunshine Skyway Bridge, Linn Cove Viaduct, and Natchez Trace Parkway Bridge
- Robert B. Hilton – Tallahassee newspaper owner and Confederate congressman during the American Civil War

== Film, television, and radio ==
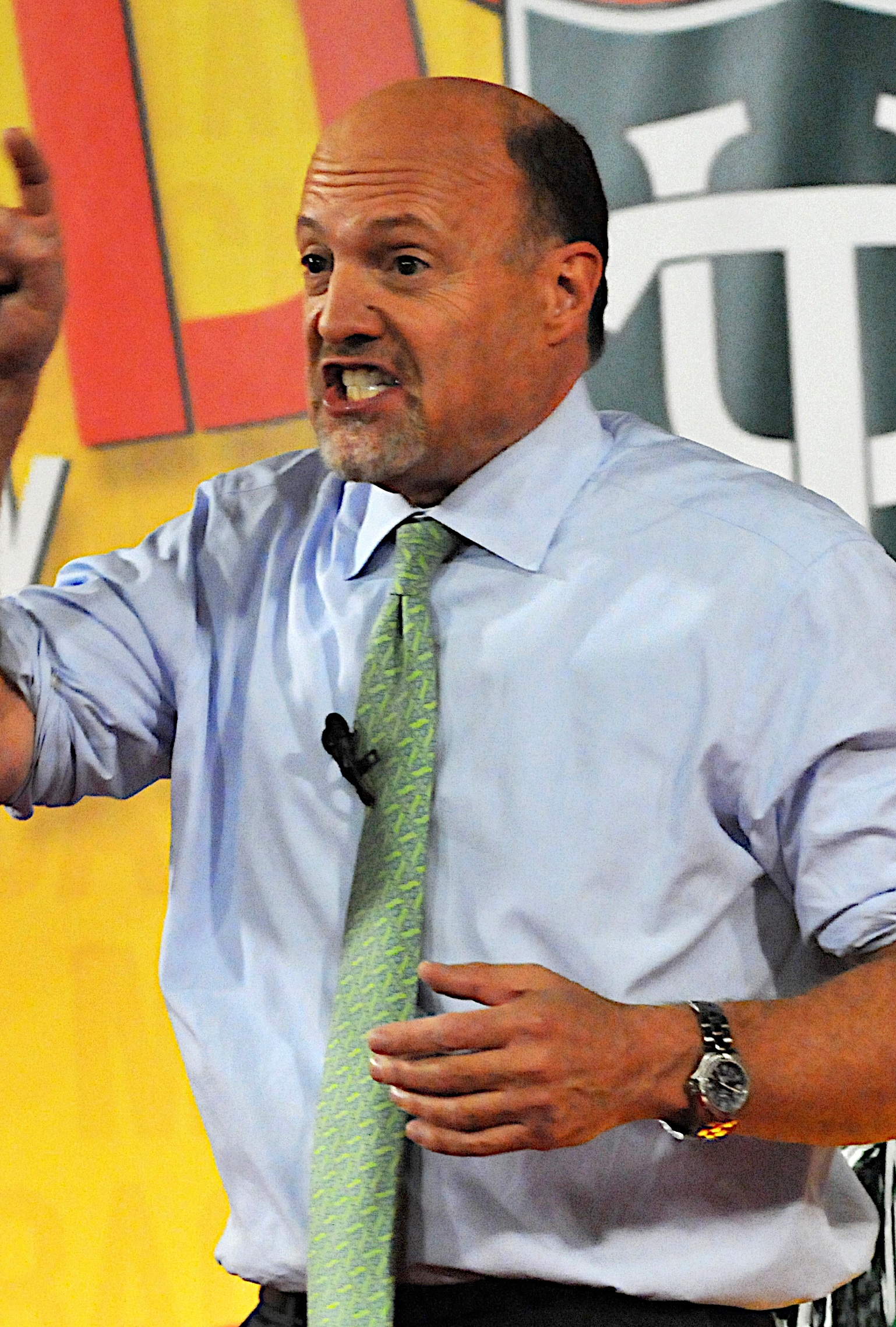
Jim Cramer, TV host

- Red Barber – sportscaster, Radio Hall of Fame member
- Jim Cramer – host of CNBC's Mad Money

=== Acting ===
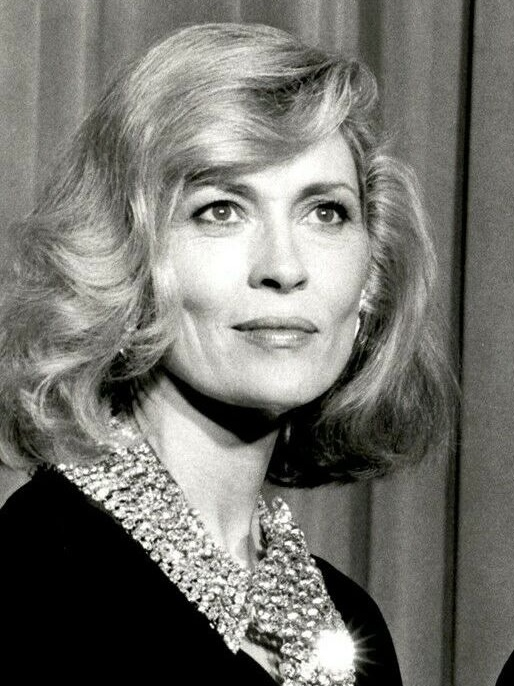
Faye Dunaway, actress

- Kay Aldridge – model and actress
- Matt Battaglia – actor and former NFL player
- Brad Davis – actor (Midnight Express, Querelle)
- Cathy Jenéen Doe – actress
- Kyan Douglas – the "grooming expert" from Queer Eye for the Straight Guy
- Faye Dunaway – actress, Academy Award winner for Network
- Tony Hale – actor, played Byron "Buster" Bluth on Arrested Development
- Cheryl Hines – actress, two-time Emmy nominee for Curb your Enthusiasm, director, married to Robert F. Kennedy, Jr.
- Polly Holliday – actress, Golden Globe winner (for television series Alice)
- Will Kirby – Big Brother 2 (2001) winner
- Christine Lahti – film actress and director, winner of Academy Award for Leiberman in Love, two Golden Globes and Emmy for Chicago Hope
- Burt Reynolds – Emmy and Golden Globe Award-winning, Oscar-nominated actor, attended FSU
- Anika Noni Rose – Tony Award-winning actress, as Emmie Thibodeaux in Caroline, or Change
- Sonny Shroyer – actor who played deputy sheriff on The Dukes of Hazzard
- Roy Wood, Jr. – comedian and actor on The Daily Show

=== Writing and production ===
- Jim Butterworth – documentary filmmaker, winner of DuPont-Columbia Award for Seoul Train
- Ron J. Friedman – writer of Disney's Academy Award-nominated film Brother Bear

== Government and politics ==
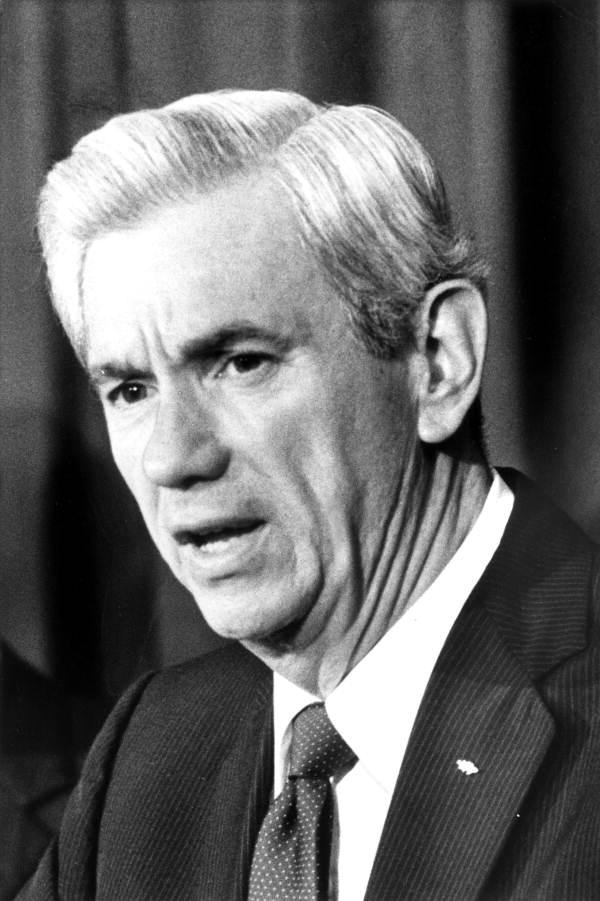
Reubin Askew, governor of Florida

- Art Agnos – former mayor of San Francisco, California
- Reubin Askew – politician, former governor of Florida
- Bobby Brantley – lieutenant governor of Florida 1987–1991
- Lawton Chiles – politician and FSU research fellow; former US senator and governor of Florida
- LeRoy Collins – politician and governor of Florida; the only Tallahassee native to serve as Florida's governor
- Parris Glendening – former governor of Maryland
- Carla Hayden – 14th Librarian of Congress
- Scott Maddox – former mayor of Tallahassee
- John Marks – mayor of Tallahassee 2003–2014
- Kenneth Minihan – former director of the National Security Agency
- Nell Foster Rogers – lobbyist
- Orson Swindle – commissioner of the Federal Trade Commission
- Gregory Tony (born 1978) – sheriff of Broward County, Florida
- Craig Waters – spokesman for the Florida Supreme Court

== Historical people ==
- Catherine Willis Gray Murat – great-grandniece of George Washington
- Prince Achille Murat – nephew of Napoleon Bonaparte
- William Hudson Rogers – professor of English and first distinguished professor at Florida State University
- Charles Kenzie Steele – clergyman and civil rights activist
- Ernest I. Thomas – raiser of the original flag at Iwo Jima

== Infamy ==
- Frederick Pete Cox – serial killer who killed 3 prostitutes in 1997
- Marshall Ledbetter – protester who took over the Florida capitol building
- Wade Wilson – serial killer, also known as the "Deadpool Killer" due to the fact that they share a name

== Music ==
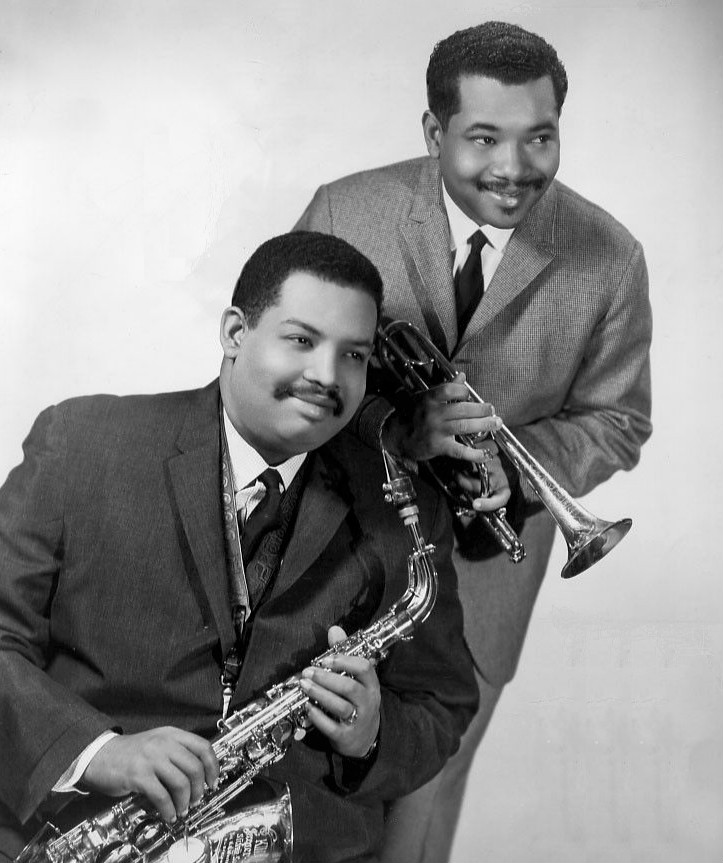
Cannonball Adderley, left, saxophonist

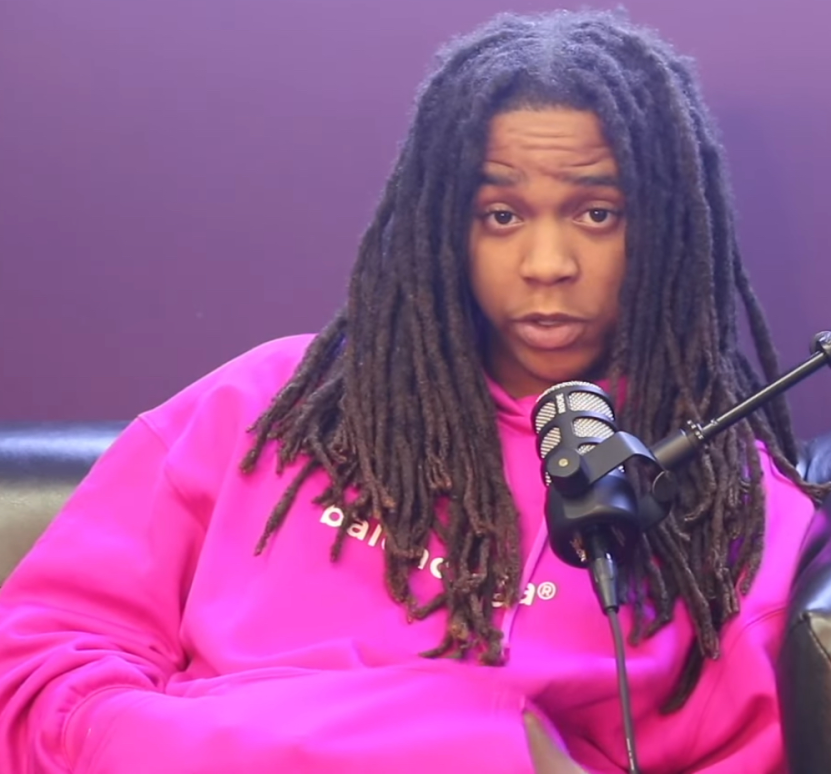
Hurricane Wisdom in 2025 in an interview with Talk of the Town

- Cannonball Adderley – jazz alto saxophone player, Grammy Award winner
- Nat Adderley – jazz cornet and trumpet player
- Ethel Cain (Hayden Anhedönia) – singer-songwriter, artist
- George Clinton – musician, founder of funk bands Parliament and Funkadelic
- Rita Coolidge – Grammy Award-winning singer, "From the Bottle to the Bottom" and "Lover Please"
- Janice Harsanyi – vocalist and teacher
- Kenny Howes – rock musician
- Roland Kent LaVoie (born July 31, 1943), better known by his stage name Lobo (Spanish for "wolf") – singer-songwriter who was successful in the 1970s
- Mayday Parade – band formed in 2005, the result of a merger between two local Tallahassee bands, Kid Named Chicago and Defining Moment
- K. Michelle (born Kimberly Michelle Pate) – reality TV personality and R&B singer
- Jim Morrison – lead singer and lyricist of The Doors
- Real Boston Richey – rapper, songwriter
- Marcus Roberts – jazz pianist
- T-Pain (born Faheem Najm) – hip hop and R&B singer
- Butch Trucks (Claude Hudson Trucks) – drummer, member of the Allman Brothers band
- Luh Tyler – rapper, songwriter
- Hurricane Wisdom – rapper, singer, and songwriter

=== Composition ===
- Creed – rock band formed in Tallahassee
- Carlisle Floyd – opera composer, Susannah (1955) and others
- Marcus Roberts – jazz pianist, composer and music professor at Florida State University
- Morgan Sorne – singer-songwriter
- Ernst von Dohnányi – composer and pianist
- Ellen Taaffe Zwilich – Pulitzer Prize-winning composer (for Three Movements for Orchestra (Symphony No. 1))

== Sports ==
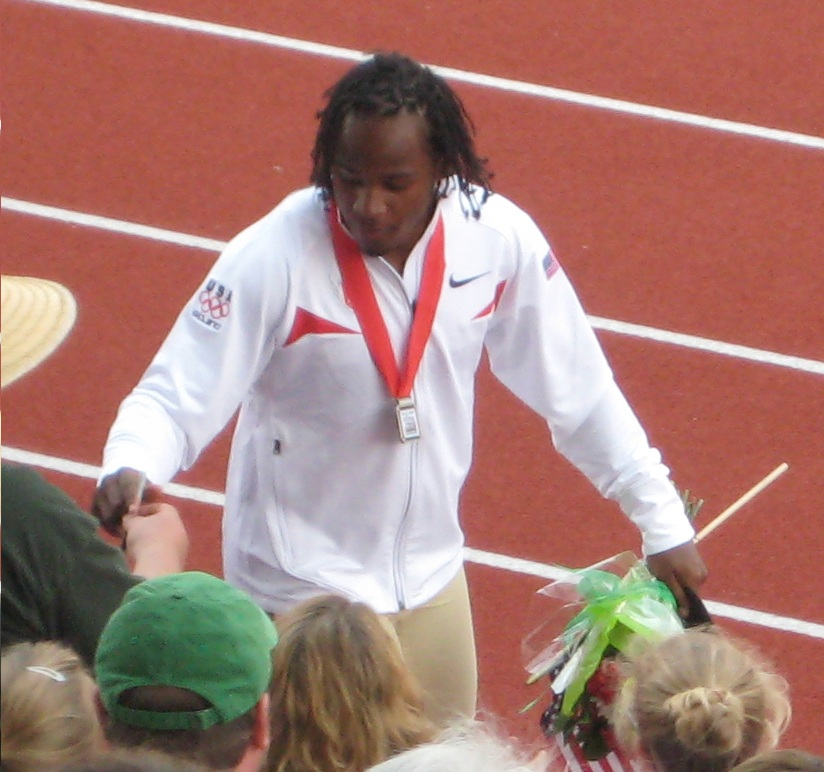
Walter Dix, sprinter

- Robert "Bobby" C. Bowden – college football coach, winner of two national championships
- Ricky Carmichael – motocross/supercross champion
- Kevin Carter – NFL defensive end
- Bradley Cooper – member of 1984 and 1988 Bahamas Summer Olympics team
- Gene Cox – State of Florida Sports Hall of Fame member (Leon High School football coach)
- Antonio Cromartie – NFL player credited with the longest play in NFL history
- Kim Crosby – NASCAR driver, with a best race finish of 20th, in 2004
- Dwight F. Davis – founder of the international tennis Davis Cup
- Walter Dix – U.S. track team member and medalist at 2008 Beijing Olympics
- Warrick Dunn – FSU and NFL football star
- Carrie Englert (Zimmerman) – member of 1976 U.S. Summer Olympics team
- Corey Fuller – played for FSU's football team, later became a wide receiver for the Vikings, Browns and Ravens
- Amari Gainer – professional American football player for the Las Vegas Raiders
- Michael Gaines – tight end for the Detroit Lions
- DaVanche (Ron) Galimore – member of 1980 U.S. Summer Olympics team
- Willie Galimore – member of College Football Hall of Fame, and NFL football player
- William Gay – NFL cornerback for the Pittsburgh Steelers
- Althea Gibson – winner of several Wimbledon and US Open tennis championships
- Frances C. Griscom – U.S. women's amateur golf champion
- Ken Harnden – hurdler and sprinter who represented Zimbabwe in the 1996 and 2000 Olympic Games
- Tahesia Harrigan – professional sprinter (BVI)
- Bob Hayes – sprinter and gold medal winner on 1964 U.S. Summer Olympics team; NFL football wide receiver for Dallas Cowboys
- Missy Hyatt – professional wrestling valet and commentator for World Championship Wrestling and Extreme Championship Wrestling
- Taylor Jacobs – professional football player, wide receiver with Washington Redskins, San Francisco 49ers, and Denver Broncos
- Marty Jannetty – professional wrestler, best known for his work with WWE
- Reggie Jefferson – MLB player
- Brad Johnson – NFL quarterback
- Brandy Johnson – member of 1988 U.S. Summer Olympics team
- Desmond Koh – amateur swimmer who represented Singapore in the 1988, 1992, and 1996 Olympic Games
- Mike "11" Martin – all-Time winningest coach in NCAA Division I College Baseball; 2019 inductee in National College Baseball Hall of Fame
- Nevin McCaskill – NFL player for the Green Bay Packers
- Michelle McCool – World Wrestling Entertainment diva (formally Diva Champion)
- Fondren Mitchell – football player
- Brian Olson – member of 1996, 2000 and 2004 U.S. Summer Olympics teams
- Burgess Owens – professional football player, member of Oakland Raider team that won Super Bowl XV
- Bill Peterson – college and NFL head football coach
- Zach Piller – NFL guard for the Tennessee Titans
- Don Pumphrey, Jr – offensive tackle for the Tampa Bay Buccaneers
- Elise Ray – gymnast, represented United States in 2000 Olympic Games
- Gabrielle Reece – professional volleyball player, model
- David Ross – MLB catcher
- Deion Sanders – FSU football star, NFL cornerback, Major League Baseball outfielder, NFL Network commentator
- Ernie Sims – NFL linebacker
- Dwight Smith – MLB outfielder
- Bobby Thigpen – MLB relief pitcher and coach
- Craphonso Thorpe – NFL wide receiver
- Marion Tinsley – world checkers champion 1955–1958, 1975–1991
- Charlie Ward – 1993 Heisman Trophy winner
- Pat Watkins – NFL safety for the Dallas Cowboys
- Chris Weinke – 2000 Heisman Trophy winner
- Boo Williams – NFL tight end for the New Orleans Saints
- Wally Williams – NFL (1993–2003), Cleveland Browns, Baltimore Ravens, and New Orleans Saints; first franchise player in Ravens history
- Jameis Winston – 2014 Heisman winner and quarterback for the Cleveland Browns
- Woody Woodward – MLB shortstop, Braves, Reds; FSU Baseball head coach (1975–1978); MLB GM, Yankees, Phillies, Mariners

== Visual arts ==
- Karl Zerbe – expressionist painter using the encaustic painting technique
