= Tallahassee (disambiguation) =

Tallahassee is the capital of the U.S. state of Florida.

Tallahassee may also refer to:

== Arts and entertainment ==
- Tallahassee, a fictional character in the 2009 film Zombieland
- "Tallahassee" (The Office), an episode of the U.S. TV series
- "Tallahassee" (Once Upon a Time), a TV episode
- Tallahassee (album), by the Mountain Goats, 2002

== Places ==
- Tallahassee metropolitan area, centred on Tallahassee, Florida, U.S.
- Tallahassee, Georgia, U.S.
  - Tallahassee Creek, a stream

== Other uses ==
- CSS Tallahassee, a steamer in the Confederate States Navy
- USS Tallahassee, the name of several U.S. Navy ships
- Tallahassee SC, an American soccer club

== See also ==
- List of people from Tallahassee, Florida
- Tallahassee 7000, a 1961 American crime drama TV series
- "The Man from Tallahassee", an episode of Lost
- Tullahassee, Oklahoma
- Tallahatchie, Mississippi
