= Larry Taylor (disambiguation) =

Larry Taylor (1942–2019) was an American bass guitarist.

Larry Taylor may also refer to:

- Larry Taylor (actor) (1918–2003), British actor
- Larry Taylor (geochemist) (1938–2017), American geochemist and petrologist
- Larry L. Taylor (1942–2024), American Medal of Honor recipient
- Larry Taylor (footballer) (born 1947), English footballer
- Larry Gene Taylor (1953–2005), Missouri state senator
- Larry Taylor (politician) (born 1960), member of the Texas Senate
- Larry Taylor (gridiron football) (born 1985), American and Canadian football player
- Larry Taylor (basketball) (born 1980), American and Brazilian basketball player

== See also ==
- Lawrence Taylor (disambiguation)
- Laurie Taylor (disambiguation)
