= Willie Carrick =

Irish footballer (1952–2023)

Personal information
- Full name: William Francis Carrick
- Date of birth: 26 September 1952
- Place of birth: Dublin, Ireland
- Date of death: 28 July 2023 (aged 70)
- Place of death: Brentwood, England
- Position: Goalkeeper

Youth career
- 1967–1972: Manchester United

Senior career*
Years	Team	Apps	(Gls)
1972	Chelmsford City	0	(0)
1972–1973	Luton Town	4	(0)
1973–1975	Chelmsford City	49	(0)
1975–1977	Enfield		
- Bishop's Stortford
- Hornchurch
- Hoddesdon Town
1981–1984	Chelmsford City	98	(1)

Managerial career
- Witham Town
- Basildon United
- * Club domestic league appearances and goals

William Francis Carrick (26 September 1952 – 28 June 2023) was an Irish footballer who played as a goalkeeper in the Football League for Luton Town.

== Playing career ==
Born in Dublin, Ireland, Carrick joined Manchester United in 1967, before signing apprenticeship forms for the club in September 1970. During his time in the youth ranks at Manchester United, Carrick predominantly played as a goalkeeper, however during a game against Bury 'B' on 27 February 1971, Carrick scored five goals playing as a striker in a 6–0 win. At the end of the 1971–72 season, Carrick was released by Manchester United, briefly signing for non-league club Chelmsford City, making his debut in a 2–2 draw against Stafford Rangers in the Non-League Championship on 12 May 1972.

Before the 1972–73 season, Carrick signed for Luton Town, however found his opportunities at the club limited, playing just four games in the Football League, with Graham Horn and Keith Barber being above Carrick in the pecking order at Luton. Following one season at Luton, Carrick re-signed for Chelmsford.

Following his return to Chelmsford, Carrick competed with Larry Taylor to be first choice goalkeeper at Chelmsford, before departing in 1975. During his time away from Chelmsford, Carrick played for Enfield, Bishop's Stortford, Hornchurch and Hoddesdon Town, before returning to Chelmsford in August 1981. On 5 May 1984, Carrick scored a penalty in a 5–0 win against Dorchester Town on the final day of the 1983–84 Southern League season. Carrick retired from football at the end of the year, playing his final game for Chelmsford against Barking in a 4–1 win in the Eastern Floodlight Competition.

== Managerial career ==
Following his playing career, Carrick entered management, managing Essex clubs Witham Town and Basildon United.

== Death ==
On 28 June 2023, it was announced that Carrick had died at the age of 70.
