= Lawrence Taylor (disambiguation) =

Lawrence Taylor (born 1959) is a retired American football player.

Lawrence Taylor may also refer to:

- Lawrence Coburn Taylor (1920–1942), US Marine Corps aviator
  - USS Lawrence C. Taylor, a John C. Butler-class destroyer escort acquired by the U.S. Navy
- Lawrence Eric Taylor (born 1942), American DUI lawyer and author
- Lawrence Palmer Taylor (born 1940), United States ambassador to Estonia
- Lawrence Taylor, lead vocalist with the English metal band While She Sleeps

== See also ==
- Larry Taylor (disambiguation)
- Laurie Taylor (disambiguation)
