= Tallahatchie =

Tallahatchie may refer to:

- Tallahatchie County, Mississippi
- Tallahatchie River
- USS Tallahatchie (1863)
- USS Tallahatchie County (LST-1154)

== See also ==
- Tallahassee (disambiguation)
