= Don Pumphrey Jr. =

American criminal defense attorney

Donald Pumphrey Jr. is a Tallahassee, Florida-based criminal defense attorney, former state prosecutor, law enforcement officer, and former NFL player.

== Early life ==
Pumphrey was born and raised in Tallahassee, Florida in 1963. His father, Don Sr., ran a tree business. He attended Lincoln High School and graduated in 1982. He proceeded to enroll at Valdosta State University to pursue a degree in business administration, where he also played football.

== Football career ==
After a standout career playing left tackle for Valdosta State University, Pumphrey was drafted by the Tampa Bay Bandits in the third round of the 1986 USFL draft.

After the USFL suspended its 1986 season, Pumphrey tried out for the Tampa Bay Buccaneers in 1987. Pumphrey started all three replacement games for the Buccaneers during the NFL Players Association strike and was released before the 1988 season.

== Career after football ==
Pumphrey returned to Tallahassee to complete his bachelor's degree at Florida State University, majoring in criminology. He graduated in 1989. He then entered the Florida Marine Patrol Academy, where he received specialized law enforcement training by the Florida Criminal Justice Standards & Training Commission.

After graduating and being sworn in as a state police officer, Pumphrey worked in both Miami-Dade and Broward County. His off-duty details involved drug enforcement and customs, as well as occasionally serving as a security guard for then-Florida Governor Lawton Chiles.

After three years service as a full-time state police officer, Pumphrey took a reserve status and clerked in a large law firm before attending the Stetson University College of Law. While at Stetson, Pumphrey excelled in trial skills and trial advocacy. Pumphrey graduated with a Juris Doctor in 1996 and accepted a position at the State Attorney's Office. During his early years as a prosecutor, Pumphrey was approached and accepted a position coaching the trial team at Stetson College of Law.

Pumphrey excelled as a prosecutor and was subsequently promoted to supervisor of a prosecutorial division, one of seven selected from an office of more than 120 attorneys at that time. Pumphrey then spent several years working for the Pinellas County State Attorney's Office. He also competed in and finished the Ironman Triathlon.

== Criminal defense attorney ==
In 1999, Pumphrey returned to his home town of Tallahassee, Florida and opened his own criminal defense legal practice. Since then, he has become one of the area's leading attorneys handling both misdemeanor and felony cases.

=== Notable cases ===
In 2007, Pumphrey represented Richard Kelley Hart who was accused of murder in relation to the death of his wife. Murder charges were dropped and Hart was freed later that year.

In 2009, Pumphrey made national headlines when he represented escaped inmate Charlie Free, who escaped from a Florida prison over 30 years prior and had been living a double life. Free was ultimately freed based on unanimous decision from the Florida Parole Commission.

=== Organizations ===
Pumphrey is an active member of the NORML Legal Committee, the National College for DUI Defense, the National Association of Criminal Defense Lawyers, the Florida Association of Criminal Defense Lawyers, the American Bar Association, the Florida Bar Association, and the NFL Alumni Association.

== Personal life ==
Pumphrey has two children and resides in Tallahassee, Florida.
