= Laurie Taylor =

Laurie Taylor may refer to:

- Laurie Taylor (sociologist) (born 1936), English sociologist and radio presenter
- Laurie Taylor (footballer, born 1916) (1916–1991), Australian rules footballer for South Melbourne, St Kilda and Hawthorn
- Laurie Taylor (footballer, born 1918) (1918–1980), Australian rules footballer for Richmond, West Adelaide and Glenelg
- Laurie Taylor (skier) (born 1996), British alpine skier
- Rocky Taylor (Laurie Taylor, born 1946), British stuntman and actor

== See also ==
- Lawrence Taylor (disambiguation)
- Larry Taylor (disambiguation)
- Lauren Taylor (disambiguation)
