= Fred Rouse (gridiron football) =

American gridiron football player (born 1985)

No. 82
- Position: Wide receiver

Personal information
- Born: December 17, 1985 (age 40); Tallahassee, Florida
- Listed height: 6 ft 3 in (1.91 m)
- Listed weight: 200 lb (91 kg)

Career information
- High school: Lincoln (Tallahassee, Florida)
- College: Florida State University (2005); UTEP (2006-2007); Concordia–Selma (AL) (2009-2010)
- NFL draft: 2011: undrafted

Career history
- Omaha Nighthawks (2011)*; Calgary Stampeders (2011–2012); Ottawa Redblacks (2014)
- * Offseason or practice squad member only
- Stats at CFL.ca (archive)

Fred Rouse (born December 17, 1985) is a former professional gridiron football wide receiver. He was originally signed by the Omaha Nighthawks of the UFL in 2011.

== Early life ==
Rouse attended Lincoln High School in his home town of Tallahassee, Florida, and was teammates with Antonio Cromartie until his sophomore year. As a senior, he had 608 receiving yards and eight touchdowns, for an average of 20.1 yards per catch. He was a Parade All-American and invited to the U.S. Army All-American Bowl, where he had five receptions for 29 yards and 55 yards in punt returns.

Regarded as a five-star recruit by Rivals.com, Rouse was ranked as the No. 2 wide receiver prospect in his class behind only Patrick Turner. He once declared that he felt ready to jump straight from the high school level to the NFL. He was heavily recruited out of high school and signed with the Florida State Seminoles, over scholarship offers from Alabama, Texas, Miami (FL), and Florida.

== College career ==
During Rouse's freshman NCAA season, he was in the Seminoles' starting lineup at the 2006 Orange Bowl against Penn State and finished the season with 6 receptions for 114 yards and one touchdown as a true freshman. Rouse then transferred to the University of Texas-El Paso, where he sat out the 2006 season, due to NCAA transfer rules. As a redshirt sophomore at UTEP in 2007, he played in 10 games and averaged 15.2 yards a catch with 2 touchdowns. Rouse later transferred to Concordia College, Selma, an unaffiliated institution, for his junior and senior seasons.

== Professional career ==
Rouse worked at the Troy University Pro Day in March 2011 in hope of being drafted. measuring in at almost 6-foot-2, 200 pounds, with a 40 time reported to be in the 4.4 range. One scout told me Rouse worked out well and excelled at catching the ball. "If you didn't know anything about his whole story, you'd say he's kind of interesting," the scout said. "But it's kind of a tale of squandered talent, judging from where all he has been." Rouse was undrafted in the 2011 NFL draft. He was signed by the Omaha Nighthawks as an undrafted free agent on August 25, 2011. He was later released without seeing playing time with the Nighthawks.

He was later signed to the Calgary Stampeders' practice roster on October 11, 2011 where he spent two weeks before being released. He was re-signed during the following off-season on February 22, 2012.

He was later one of the first three signings by the expansion Ottawa Redblacks on November 27, 2013. He was released by the Redblacks on July 31, 2014.
