= Lauren Taylor =

Lauren Taylor may refer to:

- Lauren Taylor (actress) (born 1998), American actress and singer
- Lauren Taylor (golfer) (born 1994), English golfer
- Lauren Taylor (fighter) (born 1983), American mixed martial artist
- Lauren Taylor (journalist), English broadcast journalist
- Lauren-Marie Taylor (born 1961), American film and television actress

== See also ==
- Laurie Taylor (disambiguation)
