= Jawanza Starling =

American football player (born 1991)

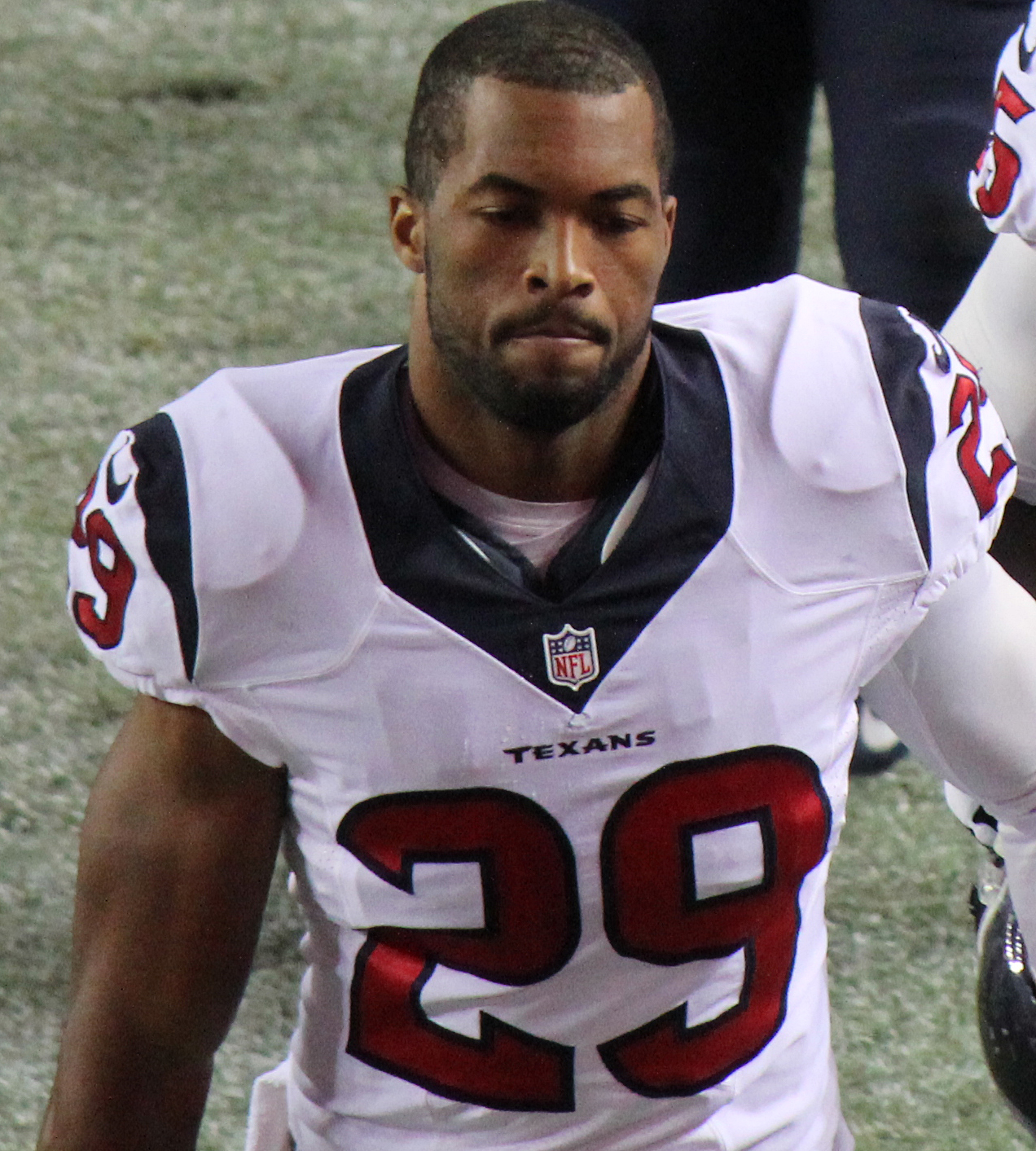
- Starling with the Houston Texans in 2014

No. 29
- Position: Safety

Personal information
- Born: June 21, 1991 (age 35); Tallahassee, Florida, U.S.
- Listed height: 6 ft 1 in (1.85 m)
- Listed weight: 200 lb (91 kg)

Career information
- High school: Lincoln (Tallahassee)
- College: USC
- NFL draft: 2013: undrafted

Career history
- Houston Texans (2013)*; New York Giants (2013)*; Houston Texans (2013–2014)
- * Offseason or practice squad member only

Career NFL statistics
- Tackles: 1
- Stats at Pro Football Reference

Jawanza Starling (born June 21, 1991) is an American former professional football player who was a safety for the Houston Texans of the National Football League (NFL). He played college football for the USC Trojans. He was signed by the Texans as an undrafted free agent in 2013. He was also a member of the New York Giants.

== Professional career ==
=== Houston Texans (first stint) ===
Starling was signed by the Houston Texans after going unselected in the 2013 NFL draft. He was released for final roster cuts before the start of the season.

=== New York Giants ===
The New York Giants signed Starling to their practice squad on September 3, 2013.

=== Houston Texans (second stint) ===
On November 14, 2013, the Texans signed Starling off the Giants' practice squad.

He was released on August 30, 2014.
