= Lincoln High School (Tallahassee, Florida) =

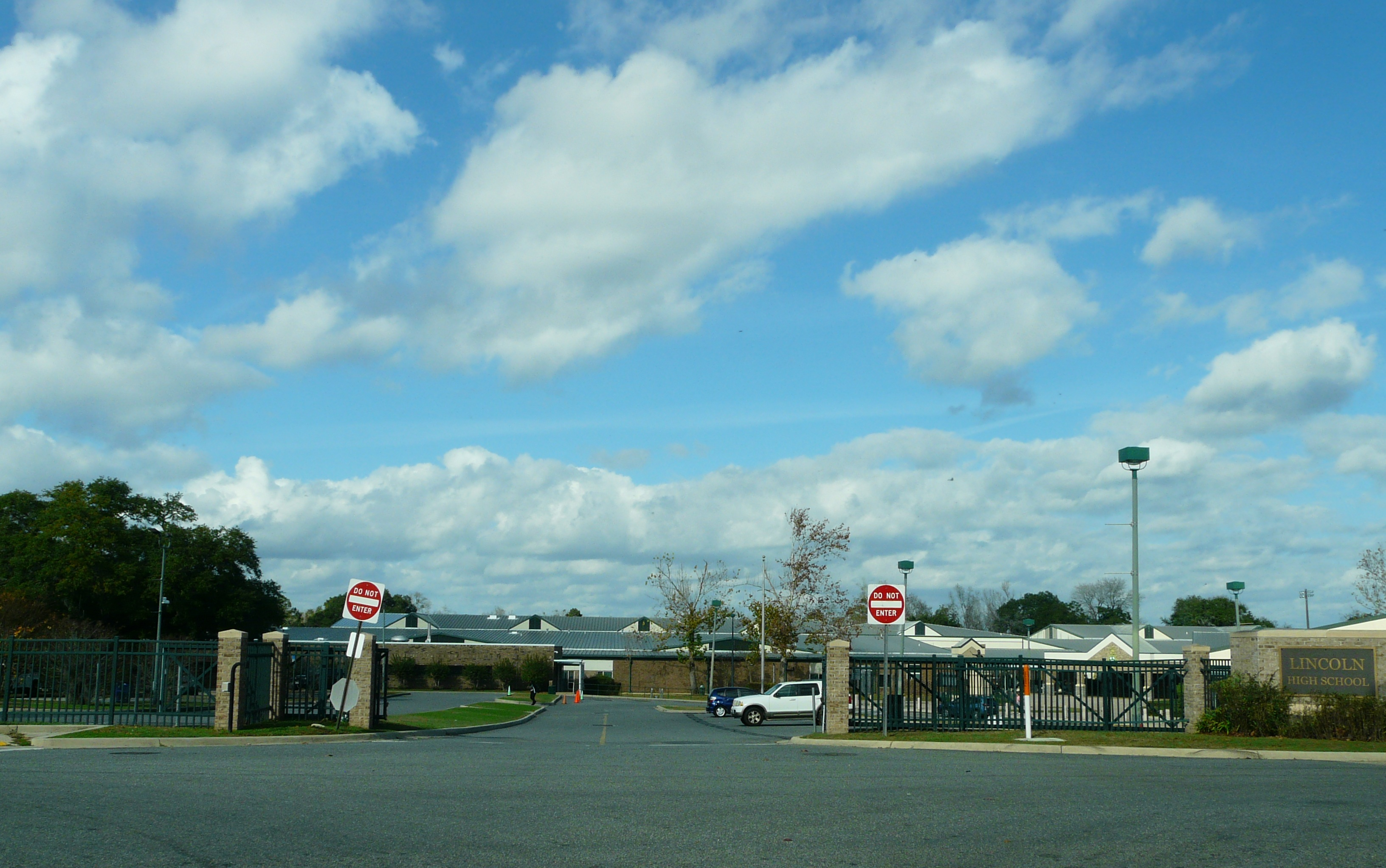
- Main entrance gate

Location
- 3838 Trojan Trail; Tallahassee, Florida 32311; United States; 30°26′13″N 84°12′43″W

Information
- Type: Public high school
- Established: 1974
- Principal: Allen Burch, PhD.
- Staff: 75.06 (FTE)
- Grades: 9–12
- Enrollment: 1,860 (2023-2024)
- Student to teacher ratio: 24.78
- Colors: Green, gold, and white
- Mascot: Trojan
- Rivals: Leon High School and Lawton Chiles High School
- Website: www.leonschools.net/lincoln

Lincoln High School is a public high school located in Tallahassee, Florida. It is part of the Leon County Schools district.

Lincoln High School offers an accelerated Advanced Placement (AP) program. In 2010, Newsweek ranked Lincoln High School as one of the top 100 high schools in the United States. On the state level, Lincoln has continuously ranked in the 90th percentile among all Florida high schools. Lincoln has also been ranked as one of the highest high schools in Florida in regards to college readiness. The "Best High Schools" report in 2016 & 2022 revealed that Lincoln High boasted the top college-readiness level of all area schools.

== History ==
Campus Lincoln High School was established in 1975 following the closure of the Old Lincoln High School in 1970 and relocated from its former location downtown to its current site in the southeast portion of the county. The school was constructed as a large one building high school with the address being 3838 Conner Blvd which was later changed to 3838 Trojan Trail in July 1982 when students petitioned the county to change the name to symbolize their school spirit. Lincoln's concept as a large one building school also changed in the late 1980s when the school had no choice but to add additional buildings to the campus.

In 1992, Lincoln completed construction of a multi-million dollar state of the art auditorium at the front of the school, the first of its kind in the district. In 2005, Lincoln was approved for a campus wide remodel which would include all buildings, parking lots, sports fields, school entrance and the construction of a new two level classroom building along with a new cafeteria building at the front of the school, the construction/remodel lasted from 2005 to 2008. During this time, the City of Tallahassee also rerouted the path of Trojan Trail to better accommodate traffic needs for the school. Once both constructions were completed portions of the Lincoln campus and surrounding area were unrecognizable from before.

Following the major construction/remodel projects, a garden/courtyard area was added to the back of the school in 2009. The area was dedicated to long-time principal Martha Bunch who had served Lincoln for 20 years. The garden was also a way to thank her for overseeing Lincoln during its most expanding times, both in population and construction. Since the numerous expanding projects of the 1990s and 2000s Lincoln has only added a new JROTC building in the spring of 2015.

Principals Douglas Frick was the founding principal of Lincoln High School and served in that position until 1989, when he moved to the district office after 14 years, due to health concerns. He was replaced that summer by William Montford, a good friend of Frick's, who had previously been the principal at Amos P. Godby High School.

Montford served as Lincoln's principal until his election as the Leon County School Superintendent in the fall of 1996 which required him to step down during the 1996–1997 school year.

Martha Bunch, an assistant principal under Montford since 1989, assumed the position of principal until the summer of 2008. Bunch was moved to a district office position following a string of investigations by the school district concerning misconduct at the school level.

During the 2008–2009 school year, Merry Ortega served as interim principal while also still working closely with the guidance of Bunch. Ortega was previously an Assistant Principal at Lincoln throughout the 1980s. Ortega’s placement at Lincoln was so that she could complete a full administrative review of the school, following Bunch’s departure. To many the 2008–2009 school year was known as "the year with two principals".

In the summer of 2009, Swift Creek Middle School principal, Allen Burch was appointed to Lincoln as both Ortega and Bunch retired from the school district. He is currently serving in that capacity, making him the longest serving principal at Lincoln.

- 1975 - 1989: Douglas Frick
- 1989 - 1996: William J. Montford
- 1996 - 2008: Martha Bunch
- 2008 - 2009: Merry Ortega
- 2009 - Current: Allen Burch

Enrollment

During the early years of Lincoln, enrollment averaged around 1800 students. It was then in the 1990s that Lincoln saw a large uptick in enrollment as the northeastern/eastern portions of Leon County saw substantial housing/subdivision growth. From the years 1994 and 1998 Lincoln's total enrollment grew from 2073 to just below 2500 making Lincoln the largest high school in the district. Enrollment then dropped to around 1798 following the opening of Chiles High school in 1999 on the north side of the county as an effort to relieve overcrowding. The opening of Chiles was a priority to then superintendent Bill Montford who had recently been principal of Lincoln and saw the impact that the large enrollment was having on the school. However enrollment at Lincoln was not low for long, within a couple of years Lincoln found itself home to 2000 students yet again. For the past decade Lincoln has continued to bounce anywhere between 2000 and 2100 students each school year. By the year 2025 Lincoln is anticipated to see another uptick in enrollment as several more housing developments are planned to be constructed in the Lincoln school zone.

The demographics for the 2015–2016 school year are as follows:

- Total: (2,092) 100%
- Black students: 37%
- White students: 51%
- Minority students: 12%

== Colors and mascot ==
Prior to the opening of Lincoln in September 1974, the entering students participated in the selection of green, gold, and white as school colors, signifying youth, vigor, merit, honor and wisdom. The mascot selected was the Trojan, which signifies personal strength, loyalty, courage, and leadership. A six-foot statue of a Trojan, erected in the summer of 2007, stands in front of the main office.

== Athletics ==
Lincoln Football helmet

Football

Lincoln High School's football program has been recognized at the national level as an elite high school program. Lincoln was named by Bleacher Report as the #4 top football factory in the nation for high school recruits. In 2012, Lincoln gained national exposure by beating St. Paul High School (Covington, Louisiana) in the Mercedes-Benz Superdome during the Allstate Sugar Bowl Prep Kickoff Classic. In 2013, Lincoln participated in a kickoff classic game on ESPN, defeating South Gwinnett High School.

Lincoln Football has won state championships in 1999, 2001, and 2010.

Lincoln's football team won the 1999 6A state championship by defeating Miami Southridge High School at Ben Hill Griffin Stadium. In 2001, Lincoln won their second state title, this time in the 4A classification, by defeating St. Thomas Aquinas High School in Doak Campbell Stadium. In 2008, Lincoln finished as state runner-up, losing to Plant High School from Tampa. In 2010, Lincoln brought home the 4A State Championship with a win over Seffner Armwood High School in the Citrus Bowl in Orlando, Florida. The 2012 Lincoln Trojans finished as state runner-up after being defeated by St. Thomas Aquinas High School in the Citrus Bowl.

Kevin Carter, Antonio Cromartie, Zach Piller, Boo Williams, PJ Alexander, Craphonso Thorpe, Pat Watkins, Don Pumphrey, Jr., Padric Scott, Jawanza Starling, B. J. Daniels, Mark Mariscal, Javorius Allen , and Omari Hand have represented the Trojans in the National Football League. After the 2009 football season, the school was named a "Nike Elite" program, which includes a multi-year contract with Nike and makes the Trojans the only Nike Elite school in northern Florida, one of only five schools in the state to earn the honor, and one of 45 in the nation.

Soccer

The boys' soccer team won the 1996 Class 6A State Championship. They also were the 1995 State runners-up to Bloomingdale High School and the 2005 State runners-up to Auburndale High School. In 2010, they reached the Final Four.

Baseball

In baseball, Lincoln has had eight players selected out of high school by the Major League Baseball Amateur Draft:

- 1965: Thomas Lomack was selected by the Cleveland Indians
- 1986: Reggie Jefferson, Cincinnati Reds
- 2003: Clegg Snipes, Pittsburgh Pirates
- 2004: Michael Criswell, Colorado Rockies; Joe Bauserman, Pittsburgh Pirates
- 2006: Cole Figueroa and J.C. Figueroa, Toronto Blue Jays
- 2012: Raphael Andrades, Kansas City Royals

Lincoln Baseball has also had a total of five head coaches. Bill Fuller: 1974-1979 & 1983-1993. Joe Durant 1980-1983. Matt Robinson 1994-2001. Joe Vallese 2002-2016. Michael Gauger 2017-Current.

In 2003, Lincoln Baseball finished as state runner-up in the 5A classification after losing the championship game to Lakewood Ranch High School.

In 2017, the Lincoln Baseball team won the Class 8A State Championship. This made Lincoln the first public school to win a state title since 2001.

Lacrosse

In 2007, the boys' lacrosse team became the first public school team in Tallahassee to defeat the Maclay School Marauders. The team won its first district title during the 2009–2010 season by defeating Leon and Chiles. They finished the year as one of the last eight teams playing in the state, eventually falling to the Bolles School in the regional final. The team is coached by Mark Williams.

Wrestling

Lincoln's dominant wrestling team is run by head coach Mike Crowder. Coach Crowder's teams at Lincoln have combined for a 393–101 record, with 1 State Champion, 7 State Finalists, and 41 Individual State place winners. His teams have been Regional Champions 10 times, Regional Runner-ups 11 times, District Champions 28 times, District Runner-ups 12 times, and City Champions for 27 years. Coach Crowder helped establish the FHSAA State Dual Meet Tournament, in which his team qualified in its inaugural year in 2017. They have since qualified for the Final 4 two times and the Elite 8 two times. Because of these accomplishments on and off the mat, Mike has been recognized many times by his peers. He has been North West Florida Coach of the year 4 times, All Big Bend Coach of the year 12 times, FACA District 3 coach of the year 6 times, and was a FACA Hall of Fame inductee in 2018 and a National Wrestling Hall of Fame inductee in 2018.

== Academic extracurriculars ==
Lincoln has won several Big Bend Brain Bowl championships in the past three decades. Their last championship in the Tallahassee Democrat-sponsored tournament came in 2011 with team members securing a $2500 top prize. Prior to this title, the Lincoln Gold team won the regional title in 2004 by going undefeated in the playoffs.

In 2006-2007 the Lincoln Gold team won first-place honors at the University of Florida fall tournament and the Rickards High School fall tournament. They took second place at the Chiles High School tournament and the Florida State University tournament. On March 12, 2007, the team finished in first place at the Tallahassee Democrat Bowl.

Lincoln's Mu Alpha Theta club finished in second place at the State Convention, and in third place at Nationals in 2003. In 2004, Lincoln again placed second and third at the State and National Conventions, respectively, with the margin between first and second places at the State Convention being the smallest in history.

That year, the Precalculus team became the first from Tallahassee to win a State title in any division. The 2006 Calculus Team was the first team from Lincoln to ever win a National title in their division.

In recent years, the Lincoln band has earned the Florida Bandmasters Association's Otto J. Kraushaar Award, which is awarded to band programs in the state of Florida that receive Superior ratings at all marching and concert evaluations throughout the year. The Symphonic Band, Lincoln's top concert ensemble, participated in the 2005 Midwest Clinic in Chicago, Illinois. The Symphonic Band also appeared at the 2004 CBDNA/NBA Southern Division Conference, the 2002 and 2009 National Concert Band Festival, the 2001 University of Florida Concert Band Invitational, the 1999 ABA Convention, the 1997 Southeastern Band Clinic, and 2011 University of Georgia Janfest.

Lincoln High students have participated in History Fair since 1987–1988, and have advanced to the National competition for 17 straight years, earning two national third-place finishes.

In 2017, Graham O'Donnell, a junior, won the National Championship for The Who Wants to Be a Mathematician 2017 National Who Wants to Be a Mathematician contest. He won $5,000 for himself, and $5,000 for the Lincoln Mu Alpha Theta club.

== Advanced Placement programs ==
Lincoln High School offers Advanced Placement (AP) programs to its students. The courses include:

- English Language and Composition
- English Literature and Composition
- Macroeconomics
- US Government and Politics
- European History
- Human Geography
- Psychology
- U.S. History
- World History
- Chinese
- French
- Latin
- Spanish
- Art History
- Music Theory
- Studio Art
- Biology
- Chemistry
- Environmental Science
- Physics 1
- Physics 2
- Physics C: Mechanics
- Calculus AB and BC
- Statistics
- Capstone Seminar
- Capstone Research

== Notable alumni ==
- Javorius Allen - Baltimore Ravens and former University of Southern California running back
- P. J. Alexander - offensive lineman for Syracuse University and NFL's New Orleans Saints, Denver Broncos and Atlanta Falcons
- Kevin Carter - former NFL player/sports broadcaster
- Antonio Cromartie - New York Jets defensive back
- B.J. Daniels - Seattle Seahawks, former University of South Florida quarterback
- Kyan Douglas - TV personality
- Cole Figueroa - former New York Yankees infielder
- Tyler Holton - former Florida State University and current Detroit Tigers pitcher
- Reggie Jefferson - former Boston Red Sox player
- Zach Piller - former Tennessee Titans offensive lineman
- Don Pumphrey, Jr. - former Tampa Bay Buccaneer offensive lineman
- TeJyrica Robinson (born 1998), American hurdler
- Fred Rouse - former Florida State Seminoles wide receiver
- Oluwatoyin Salau - activist, murdered in Tallahassee, Florida
- Jawanza Starling - former Houston Texans and USC safety
- Craphonso Thorpe - former Indianapolis Colts wide receiver
- Pat Watkins - former Dallas Cowboys safety
- Boo Williams - former New Orleans Saints tight end
- Raylen Wilson - college football linebacker for the Georgia Bulldogs

Faculty

- Dean Palmer - former MLB player; baseball coach
