= Omari Hand =

American football player (born 1980)

No. 91, 93, 95
- Position: Defensive end

Personal information
- Born: July 3, 1980 (age 46); Philadelphia, Pennsylvania, U.S.
- Listed height: 6 ft 4 in (1.93 m)
- Listed weight: 265 lb (120 kg)

Career information
- High school: Lincoln (Tallahassee, Florida)
- College: Arkansas (1998–2002)
- NFL draft: 2003: undrafted

Career history
- San Diego Chargers (2003–2004); Jacksonville Jaguars (2004–2005)*; → Amsterdam Admirals (2005); Montreal Alouettes (2005); Jacksonville Jaguars (2005–2006)*
- * Offseason or practice squad member only

Awards and highlights
- World Bowl champion (XIII)

Career NFL statistics
- Games played: 1
- Tackles: 2
- Stats at Pro Football Reference

Career CFL statistics
- Games played: 1
- Stats at CFL.ca

Omari Sean Hand (born July 3, 1980) is an American former professional football defensive end who played in the National Football League (NFL) for the San Diego Chargers and Jacksonville Jaguars. He played college football for the Tennessee Volunteers. Hand also had a stint in NFL Europe with the Amsterdam Admirals and in the Canadian Football League (CFL) with the Montreal Alouettes.

== Early life ==
Hand was born on July 3, 1980, in Philadelphia, Pennsylvania. He attended Lincoln High School in Tallahassee, Florida.

== College career ==
Hand played college football for the Tennessee Volunteers from 1998 to 2002. He was a four-year letterman from 1999 to 2002. Hand played in 34 games, starting 12, recording 105 tackles, including ten for loss, 3.5 sacks, one pass deflection, forced fumble and fumble recovery.

== Professional career ==
Pre-draft measurables
Height	Weight	Arm length	Hand span	40-yard dash	Bench press
6 ft 4 in (1.93 m)	267 lb (121 kg)	33 7/8 in (0.86 m)	10 3/4 in (0.27 m)	4.85 s	34 reps
All values from NFL Combine

=== San Diego Chargers ===
After going undrafted in the 2003 NFL draft, Hand signed with the San Diego Chargers as an undrafted free agent. On August 31, 2003, he was waived by the team and then signed to the practice squad on September 2. On November 4, Hand was released. On November 12, he was re-signed to the practice squad. On November 29, 2003, Hand was signed to the active roster. He played in the final games against the Oakland Raiders, making two tackles. On August 31, 2004, he was released by the team.

=== Jacksonville Jaguars (first stint) ===
On December 23, 2004, Hand signed with the Jacksonville Jaguars. On January 4, 2005, he signed a reserve/future contract. On September 3, Hand was released.

=== Amsterdam Admirals ===
In 2005, Hand was allocated to the Amsterdam Admirals of NFL Europe. He played in 10 games, recording 22 tackles, three sacks and one pass deflection. Hand was a starter in the World Bowl XIII victory over the Berlin Thunder.

=== Montreal Alouettes ===
In October 2005, Hand was signed to the Montreal Alouettes of the Canadian Football League (CFL). He was activated and played in one game for the Alouettes.

=== Jacksonville Jaguars (second stint) ===
On January 3, 2006, Hand re-signed with the Jaguars to the practice squad. On January 9, he signed a reserve/futures contract.On June 28, Hand was released by the team.
