= Lawrence Eric Taylor =

American attorney and author (born 1942)

Lawrence E. Taylor
- Born: Lawrence Eric Taylor; April 1, 1942; Los Angeles, California, U.S.
- Died: October 4, 2023 (aged 81); Long Beach, California, U.S.
- Education: University of California, Berkeley (BA); University of California, Los Angeles (JD)
- Occupations: Attorney, author
- Military Service
- Branch: United States Marine Corps
- Service years: 1961-1964
- Website: DUI Center

Lawrence Eric Taylor (April 1, 1942 - October 4, 2023) was an American attorney and author. A graduate of the University of California, Berkeley and UCLA School of Law, Taylor was a public defender and criminal prosecutor in Los Angeles County before entering private practice.

== Career ==
Taylor served in the United States Marine Corps from 1961 to 1964.

He served as a Deputy District Attorney for Los Angeles County from 1970 to 1971 and as a Deputy Public Defender from 1971 to 1972.

In the case of the People v. Charles Manson, Taylor was the trial court's legal advisor. He was also counsel to the California Supreme Court in the Onion Field murder case, and an independent Special Prosecutor retained by the Attorney General of Montana to conduct a one-year grand jury probe of government corruption from 1975 to 1976. Taylor was voted "professor of the year" during his tenure at Gonzaga University School of Law in Spokane, Washington from 1982 to 1985. He was also a Fulbright Professor of Law at Osaka University in Japan in 1985 and a visiting professor at Pepperdine University School of Law.

He founded and served as dean of the National College for DUI Defense from 1995 to 1996. He has lectured at over 200 lawyers' seminars in 38 states. He is the author of 12 books, including the well-known textbook on the subject of DUI, now in its seventh edition. On July 25, 2002, Taylor was presented with the NCDD's "Lifetime Achievement Award" at Harvard Law School.

== Personal life ==
Taylor was married to Judy Strother. On or before October 4, 2023, at their home in Naples, Long Beach, he shot and killed his wife, 75 before committing suicide.

== Bibliography ==
- Drunk Driving Defense 7th Edition. (Wolters Kluwer Law & Business/Aspen Publishers ISBN 0-7355-5429-3)(Co-authored with Steven Oberman beginning with the 5th edition)
- Born to Crime (Greenwood Press ISBN 0-313-24172-4)
- California Drunk Driving Defense, 3rd Edition (West ISBN 0-314-26005-6)
- The D.A.: A True Story (William Morrow ISBN 0-688-11731-7)
- Eyewitness Identification (Michie ISBN 0-87215-423-8)
- Handling Criminal Appeals (West ISBN 0-685-59836-5)
- Scientific Interrogation (Michie ISBN 0-87215-685-0)
- Setting Sail (Icarus ISBN 0-8965170-0-4)
- To Honor and Obey (William Morrow ISBN 0-688-09854-1)
- Trail of the Fox (Simon and Schuster ISBN 0-671-25227-5)
- A Trial of Generals (Icarus ISBN 0-89651-775-6)
- Witness Immunity (Charles C.Thomas ISBN 0-398-04765-0)
