= Tallahassee Creek =

Stream in Georgia, U.S.

Coordinates: 31°34′0.62″N 84°20′42.68″W

Tallahassee Creek is a stream in the U.S. state of Georgia. It is a tributary to Kiokee Creek.

The name "Tallahassee" is a name derived from the Muskogean language meaning "old town". Variant names are "Asteechee Creek", "Oskeetochee Creek", "Osketochee Creek", "Osketochy Creek", "Osteetchee Creek", and "Osteetoche Creek".
