= Zach Piller =

American football player (born 1976)

No. 76, 69
- Position: Guard

Personal information
- Born: May 2, 1976 (age 50); St. Petersburg, Florida, U.S.
- Listed height: 6 ft 5 in (1.96 m)
- Listed weight: 315 lb (143 kg)

Career information
- High school: Lincoln (Tallahassee, Florida)
- College: Florida
- NFL draft: 1999: 3rd round, 81st overall pick

Career history
- Tennessee Titans (1999–2006); Detroit Lions (2007)*; New York Giants (2007)*; Florida Tuskers (2009)*
- * Offseason or practice squad member only

Awards and highlights
- Bowl Alliance national champion (1996); Second-team All-SEC (1998)

Career NFL statistics
- Games played: 87
- Games started: 58
- Stats at Pro Football Reference

Zachary Paul Piller (born May 2, 1976) is an American former professional football player who was a guard in the National Football League (NFL) for eight seasons during the late 1990s and 2000s. Piller played college football for the University of Florida, where he was a member of a national championship team in 1996. Thereafter, he played professionally for the Tennessee Titans of the NFL.

== Early life ==
Piller was born in St. Petersburg, Florida. but primarily grew up in Tallahassee, Florida and attended Lincoln High School where he was a starting offensive lineman for the Lincoln Trojans high school football team.

== College career ==
Piller initially accepted an athletic scholarship to attend Georgia Tech in Atlanta, Georgia, where he played for the Georgia Tech Yellow Jackets football team. After his freshman year ended, he transferred to the University of Florida in Gainesville, Florida, and played for coach Steve Spurrier's Florida Gators football team from 1996 to 1998. Piller was a sophomore letterman on the 1996 Gators squad that defeated the in-state rival Florida State Seminoles in the Sugar Bowl to win the national championship. As a senior team captain in 1998, he was a first-team All-Southeastern Conference (SEC) selection.

Piller graduated from the University of Florida with a bachelor's degree in exercise and sport science in 2006.

== Professional career ==
The Tennessee Titans selected Piller in the third round (eighty-first overall pick) in the 1999 NFL draft. He played for the Titans from 1999 to 2006. After playing eighty-seven games for the Titans (and starting in fifty-eight of them), Piller was released by the team on February 20, 2007.

Piller was signed by the Detroit Lions on March 23, 2007; he was released on May 3. Piller signed with the New York Giants on June 7, 2007, only to be released again on September 2. After spending two seasons out of football, Piller was selected by the Florida Tuskers of the United Football League (UFL) in the UFL Premiere Season Draft in 2009. He signed with the team on August 17, but was released before the season began.

== See also ==
- Florida Gators football, 1990–99
- Georgia Tech Yellow Jackets
- History of Tennessee Titans
- List of Florida Gators in the NFL draft
- List of University of Florida alumni
