= Kevin Carter (American football) =

American football player (born 1973)

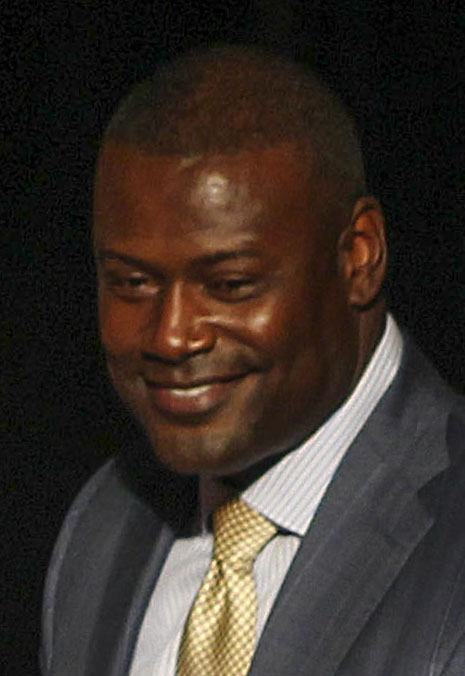
- Carter in 2015

No. 93
- Positions: Defensive end, defensive tackle

Personal information
- Born: September 21, 1973 (age 53); Miami, Florida, U.S.
- Listed height: 6 ft 6 in (1.98 m)
- Listed weight: 305 lb (138 kg)

Career information
- High school: Lincoln (Tallahassee, Florida)
- College: Florida
- NFL draft: 1995: 1st round, 6th overall pick

Career history
- St. Louis Rams (1995–2000); Tennessee Titans (2001–2004); Miami Dolphins (2005–2006); Tampa Bay Buccaneers (2007–2008)

Awards and highlights
- Super Bowl champion (XXXIV); First-team All-Pro (1999); 2× Pro Bowl (1999, 2002); NFL sacks leader (1999); NFL forced fumbles co-leader (1996); Consensus All-American (1994); First-team All-SEC (1994); Second-team All-SEC (1992); University of Florida Athletic Hall of Fame; Florida–Georgia Hall of Fame

Career NFL statistics
- Tackles: 637
- Sacks: 104.5
- Forced fumbles: 18
- Fumble recoveries: 14
- Stats at Pro Football Reference

Kevin Louis Carter (born September 21, 1973) is an American former professional football player who was a defensive end in the National Football League (NFL) for 14 seasons in the 1990s and 2000s. Carter played college football for the Florida Gators, earning All-American honors. A first-round pick in the 1995 NFL draft, he played in the NFL for the St. Louis Rams, Tennessee Titans, Miami Dolphins, and Tampa Bay Buccaneers.

== Early life ==
Carter was born in Miami, Florida. He attended Lincoln High School in Tallahassee, Florida, and was a letterman for the Lincoln Trojans high school football and basketball teams. In football, he was a Parade magazine high school All-American. Carter was a saxophone player in the marching band until he started his first season of football as a junior. He was a member of the school's Crime and Drug Prevention Task Force and was named Student-Athlete of the Year as a senior.

== College career ==
Carter accepted an athletic scholarship to attend the University of Florida in Gainesville, Florida, where he was a four-year letterman for coach Steve Spurrier's Florida Gators football team from 1991 to 1994. During his four seasons as a Gator, the team won three Southeastern Conference (SEC) championships (1991, 1993, 1994).

In his freshman season, Carter played in eleven games and started two, and tallied fourteen tackles. Following his sophomore season in 1992, he was a second-team All-SEC selection and a Football News honorable mention All-American after compiling sixty-four tackles (thirty-eight solo), twelve forced quarterback hurries, 3.5 sacks, and six tackles for a loss. As a junior in 1993, he made fifty-nine tackles (11.5 for losses), 6.5 sacks, twelve pressures and blocked a field goal, and was recognized as a first-team All-SEC Selection.

As a senior in 1994, Carter was a first-team All-SEC selection and a consensus first-team All-American. Football News named him one of five finalists for its 1994 Defensive Player of the Year Award, and he was a semifinalist for the 1994 Lombardi Award, presented to the nation's top lineman. His 42.5 career tackles for a loss and 21.5 quarterback sacks ranked seventh and fifth, respectively, in Gators history. Carter's 11.5 sacks in 1994 were then the third-best seasonal total in school history. He started thirty-eight of his last thirty-nine games at defensive end.

Carter served as president of the University of Florida chapter of the Fellowship of Christian Athletes. In 2000, Carter was voted to the Florida Gator All-Century Team and in 2006 he was voted to the University of Florida Gator 100th Anniversary Team. Carter was inducted into the University of Florida Athletic Hall of Fame as a "Gator Great" in 2004.

== Professional career ==
=== Pre-draft ===
Pre-draft measurables
Height	Weight	Arm length	Hand span	40-yard dash	Vertical jump
6 ft 5 5/8 in (1.97 m)	274 lb (124 kg)	33 1/4 in (0.84 m)	10 5/8 in (0.27 m)	4.66 s	36.5 in (0.93 m)
All values from NFL Combine/Pro Day

At the University of Florida Pro Day, Carter ran a 4.66 40-yard dash at 274 pounds while recording a vertical jump of 36½ inches.

==== St. Louis Rams ====
The St. Louis Rams selected Carter in the first round (sixth pick overall) of the 1995 NFL draft. He signed a contract with the Rams for a reported $10 million over six years.

During his rookie year with the Rams, Carter ranked second on the team and second among rookies with six sacks, while posting 50 tackles, two forced fumbles, one safety and one fumble recovery. He was named the Rams' Rookie of the Year. He recorded his first career sack when he dropped Brett Favre for a 10-yard loss in Green Bay (9/3/1995). He tallied first career safety when he sacked New York Jets quarterback Boomer Esiason in end zone (12/3/1995).

In 1998, Carter led the team in sacks with twelve and tied for sixth in the NFC, earning him the Daniel F. Reeves Memorial Award as the Rams' Most Valuable Player. He was also a Pro Bowl alternate.

His best season as a pro came in 1999 with the Rams when he tallied a career high 17 quarterback sacks which led the NFL and was the highest sack total by a Ram since Jack Youngblood collected 18 sacks in 1979. These efforts earned him a spot on the 1999 Pro Bowl team. He also became the first defensive end to represent the Rams at Pro Bowl since Youngblood in 1979. Carter was a consensus All-Pro selection in 1999, in addition to being named to the All-Madden and Phil Simms' All-Iron Teams. The 1999 Rams defense, anchored by Carter at left defensive end, had the No. 1-ranked rushing defense in the NFL (74.3 ypg) and led the NFL in quarterback sacks with fifty-seven (tied with the Jacksonville Jaguars).

Carter (7.5 sacks in the month of November) was recognized as the NFC Defensive Player of the Month and earned NFC Defensive Player of the Week honors in Week Eight versus the Carolina Panthers. He and his teammates ended the 1999 regular season with a 13–3 record and were Super Bowl XXXIV champions. Carter made one of the Rams' sacks in the Super Bowl XXXIV win over the Tennessee Titans.

In 2000, Carter totaled 10.5 sacks and started thirteen of the sixteen games he played for the Rams. In 2000, for the first time in his career, Carter moved to defensive tackle in the Rams' nickel defense, with Leonard Little playing the left defensive end position. After the 2000 season he was traded to the Tennessee Titans in exchange for a 2001 first-round draft choice on April 4, 2001, later used on Ryan Pickett.

==== Tennessee Titans ====
Carter was traded to the Titans in 2001 and continued the same stellar performances he had with the Rams. During his first season, he recorded 61 tackles and two sacks and led the team with 34 quarterback pressures. Carter had 10 sacks and was voted to his second Pro Bowl in 2002 and named second-team All-Pro by Football Digest.

In 2003, he started all 16 games, and led the Titans linemen with 79 tackles. He added 5.5 sacks, one forced fumble and a pass defensed. Played both end and tackle and was instrumental in helping Tennessee to the No. 1-ranked rushing defense in the NFL (80.9 yards per game), marking the second time in his career that Carter played on the NFL's top-ranked rushing defense. Although Carter did not gain any individual honors, his play was noticed by opposing NFL coaches. In December 2003, Pro Football Weekly reported, "Patriots head coach Bill Belichick argued that DL Kevin Carter—who starts at the DLE spot and plays inside on passing downs—could be considered for league MVP."

In 2004, Carter started all 16 games for the Titans, however, seven were at his usual left defensive end position and nine were at left defensive tackle. Posted a career-high and team-leading 82 tackles while sacking the quarterback 6 times while recovering one fumble and forcing one fumble and batting away two passes. His contract was terminated by Tennessee on February 22, 2005, after earning $20.5 million in his four seasons with the Titans.

==== Miami Dolphins ====
Carter was signed by Miami on March 7, 2005. In 2005, Carter started all 16 games at left defensive end for the Dolphins and totaled 54 tackles, six sacks, four passes defensed, one fumble recovery, and one forced fumble. His sack total tied with David Bowens for second on the team. He notched the second safety of his career in win at New Orleans (October 30, 2005) when he sacked Saints quarterback Aaron Brooks in the end zone.

The following season (2006) Carter again started all 16 games for the Dolphins, marking the sixth consecutive season that he started all 16 contests. Carter had 45 tackles, 5.5 sacks and two fumble recoveries. New England Patriots head coach Bill Belichick said this about Carter and the Dolphins' front four, "When they get to third down, they put Vonnie Holliday inside with Kevin Carter, and [David] Bowens and Jason Taylor on the edge, it's the best pass rushing group I think we've seen all year across the board. Every one of those guys can definitely rush."

Carter's contract was terminated by Miami on March 2, 2007. Carter's release came after he was unable to reach an agreement on a restructured contract with Miami. Carter earned $10 million in his two seasons with Miami.

==== Tampa Bay Buccaneers ====
Three days after his release by the Dolphins, on March 5, 2007, Carter signed with the Tampa Bay Buccaneers. Carter played sixteen games while starting fourteen for the Bucs in 2007, compiling forty-three tackles, three sacks and one forced fumble. Carter was released on February 27, 2008, in what was described as a "cost-cutting" move. However, on March 25, 2008, Carter re-signed with the Bucs. He reportedly turned down a two-year deal with the Oakland Raiders to sign a one-year $3.5 million deal with Tampa Bay. Carter had earned $5.2 million in 2007 with the Buccaneers and would have earned $5.8 million in 2008 ($3.8 million plus a $2 million roster bonus). Carter's agent stated, "It was big money he turned down (from Oakland), but he went with heart rather than the pocket". Carter has a chance to be the Bucs' starting left end in 2008, but he'll likely come off the field on passing downs. He registered forty-nine tackles and four sacks while starting every game for the Buccaneers in 2008. Carter earned $8.7 million in his two seasons with the Bucs. After the 2008 season, the Buccaneers chose not to resign Carter, who was a free agent, and on April 28, 2009, Carter visited the Detroit Lions seeking a contract. After passing on the Lions offer, Carter remained an unsigned free agent and subsequently retired from football.

In his fourteen-season NFL career, Carter, never missing a game, played in 224 regular season games, starting in 219 of them. He totaled 104.5 career sacks, reaching double digits four times (1998–2000, 2002) and leading his team five times (1996, 1998, 1999, 2002, 2004). He earned just over $49 million during his career.

== NFL career statistics ==
Legend
	Won the Super Bowl
	Led the league
**Bold**	Career best

Year	Team	GP	Tackles				Fumbles	
Year	Team	GP	Cmb	Solo	Ast	Sck	FF	FR
1995	STL	16	37	33	4	6.0	1	1
1996	STL	16	53	37	16	9.5	**6**	1
1997	STL	16	42	30	12	7.5	3	**2**
1998	STL	16	**60**	**49**	11	12.0	0	0
1999	STL	16	34	30	4	**17.0**	4	**2**
2000	STL	16	35	31	4	10.5	1	1
2001	TEN	16	36	28	8	2.0	0	0
2002	TEN	16	42	27	15	10.0	0	1
2003	TEN	16	48	29	19	5.5	1	0
2004	TEN	16	49	26	**23**	6.0	1	1
2005	MIA	16	52	34	18	6.0	1	1
2006	MIA	16	45	28	17	5.5	0	**2**
2007	TB	16	43	32	11	3.0	1	1
2008	TB	16	49	28	21	4.0	1	0
Career		224	625	442	183	104.5	20	13

== Personal life ==
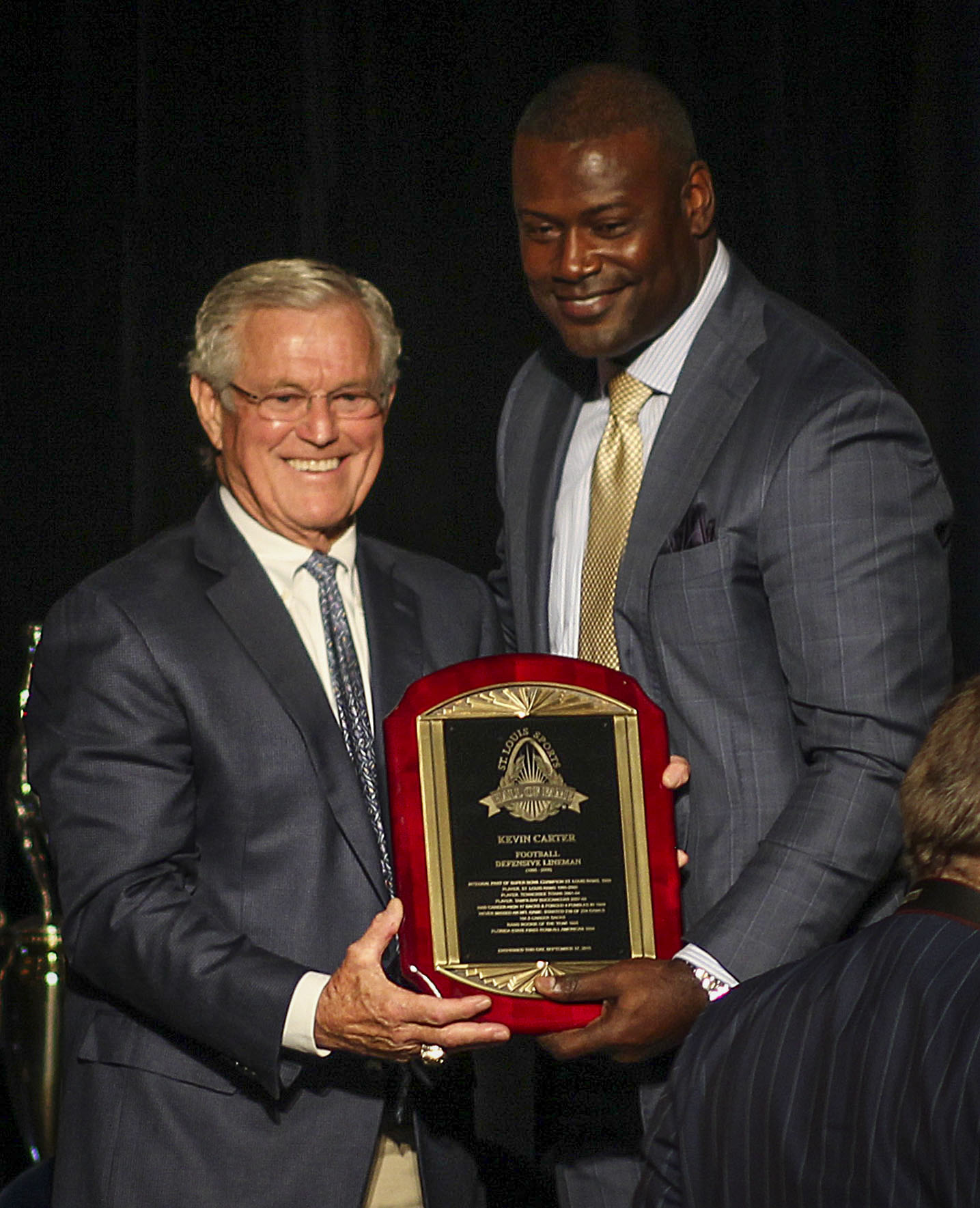
Carter with Dick Vermeil with the former's plaque during his induction ceremony in St. Louis Sports Hall of Fame, September 17, 2015

Carter is active in community endeavors. He and his wife, Shima, established the Kevin Carter Foundation in 2002, which is an organization created to enrich the lives of children, focusing on youth and character development. One of Carter's favorite quotes from his father is: "To whom much is given, much is expected" and he founded his organization on that principle.

For the past eleven years, Carter has hosted the "Waiting for Wishes" celebrity dinner and reception, where he and his teammates, along with Hollywood stars and musicians have come together to be the waiters and waitresses for dinner attendees. The annual dinner has generated thousands of dollars for the Make-A-Wish Foundation and the Kevin Carter Foundation. Carter was named the Community Man of the Year Award for three straight years by his Titans' teammates, and while he was with the Rams, he was named a United Way African American Leadership Giver.

In 1998, Carter founded the Kevin Carter Football Endowment at the University of Florida, which provides scholarships to deserving college athletes. He also serves on the NFL Players Association Executive Committee.

== See also ==
- 1994 College Football All-America Team
- Florida Gators football, 1990–99
- List of Florida Gators football All-Americans
- List of Florida Gators in the NFL draft
- List of Miami Dolphins players
- List of St. Louis Rams first-round draft picks
- List of St. Louis Rams players
- List of University of Florida alumni
- List of University of Florida Athletic Hall of Fame members
- List of most consecutive starts and games played by National Football League players
