= Craphonso Thorpe =

American football player (born 1983)

No. 15, 8
- Position: Wide receiver

Personal information
- Born: June 27, 1983 (age 43); Tallahassee, Florida, U.S.
- Listed height: 6 ft 0 in (1.83 m)
- Listed weight: 187 lb (85 kg)

Career information
- High school: Lincoln (Tallahassee)
- College: Florida State
- NFL draft: 2005: 4th round, 116th overall pick

Career history
- Kansas City Chiefs (2005); Houston Texans (2006)*; Detroit Lions (2006)*; Indianapolis Colts (2007); Jacksonville Jaguars (2008)*; New York Giants (2008)*; Tennessee Titans (2009)*; Winnipeg Blue Bombers (2009); New York Sentinels (2009); Omaha Nighthawks (2010)*
- * Offseason or practice squad member only

Awards and highlights
- First-team All-ACC (2003)

Career NFL statistics
- Receptions: 12
- Receiving yards: 70
- Receiving touchdowns: 1
- Return yards: 349
- Stats at Pro Football Reference

Career CFL statistics
- Receptions: 2
- Receiving yards: 27
- Stats at CFL.ca (archived)

Craphonso Ja'won "Cro" Thorpe (born June 27, 1983) is an American former professional football player who was a wide receiver in the National Football League (NFL). He played college football for the Florida State Seminoles and was selected by the Kansas City Chiefs in the fourth round of the 2005 NFL draft.

Thorpe was also a member of the Houston Texans, Detroit Lions, Indianapolis Colts, Jacksonville Jaguars, New York Giants, Tennessee Titans, Winnipeg Blue Bombers, New York Sentinels, and Omaha Nighthawks.

== Early life ==
Craphonso's first name is derived from his father's two given names, Craig and Alphonso, and is pronounced roughly "Crah-fonzo".

He attended Lincoln High School in Tallahassee, Florida. His senior year saw him catch 64 passes for 1,024 yards and eight touchdowns. He also played cornerback, and was regarded as a top prospect in Florida at both positions. Thorpe recorded 24 tackles, three interceptions, 14 pass break-ups and recovered two fumbles at the cornerback position. Lincoln High School won the Florida State Title Championship in his junior year there.

In track, he was a fast 100m runner, placing 2nd in the Florida 4A Track Meet behind Wharton High Schools Dwight Ellick in his senior year. His time in the finals was 10.68, Ellick ran a 10.6 flat.

He played in the first-ever U.S. Army All-American Bowl on December 30, 2000.

== Professional career ==
=== Kansas City Chiefs ===
Thorpe was selected by the Kansas City Chiefs in the fourth round (116th overall) of the 2005 NFL draft. He signed a three-year contract with the team on July 29, 2005. He was released by the team during final cuts on September 3, 2005.

Following his release, Thorpe was added to the Chiefs' practice squad. He remained there until December 30, 2005, when he was signed to the active roster. However, he was inactive for the team's final game of the season.

Thorpe battled a shoulder injury during the 2006 preseason and was waived by the team on August 28, 2006.

=== Houston Texans ===
On October 17, 2006, the Houston Texans signed Thorpe to their practice squad. He was released by the team on October 25.

=== Detroit Lions ===
Thorpe remained unsigned until January 2, 2007, when he signed with the Detroit Lions. He failed to make it to training camp with the team, however, and was waived on April 18.

=== Indianapolis Colts ===
Thorpe was then claimed off waivers by the Indianapolis Colts. He was waived by the team on September 1, 2007, but re-signed to the practice squad on September 20, 2007.

On October 7, 2007, Thorpe was signed to the active roster after Rob Morris was placed on injured reserve. He made his NFL debut that day against the Tampa Bay Buccaneers, returning three kickoffs for 19 yards and four punts for nine yards.

Thorpe recorded his first offensive statistics against the San Diego Chargers on November 11, 2007, catching five passes for 41 yards in what would also be his most productive game of the season. He caught another pass for six yards the following week against the Kansas City Chiefs.

In the team's regular season finale against the Tennessee Titans, Thorpe caught his first career touchdown on a three-yard pass from backup quarterback Jim Sorgi.

Two weeks later, Thorpe was inactive for the team's divisional round playoff game against the Chargers, which the Colts lost 28–24. He was waived by the team the following offseason on February 29, 2008.

=== Jacksonville Jaguars ===
On May 31, 2008, Thorpe was signed by the Jacksonville Jaguars to a one-year, $370,000 contract. However, he was waived on June 16.

=== New York Giants ===
On June 20, 2008, Thorpe signed with the New York Giants. He was released with an injury settlement on August 28.

=== Tennessee Titans ===
After spending the 2008 season out of football, Thorpe was signed by the Tennessee Titans on January 6, 2009. He was waived on July 7, 2009.

=== Winnipeg Blue Bombers ===
Thorpe signed a practice roster agreement by the Winnipeg Blue Bombers on July 13, 2009. He was released on September 2.

=== New York Sentinels ===
Thorpe was signed by the New York Sentinels of the United Football League on September 9, 2009.
