= William Hudson Rogers =

American academic (1894–1975)

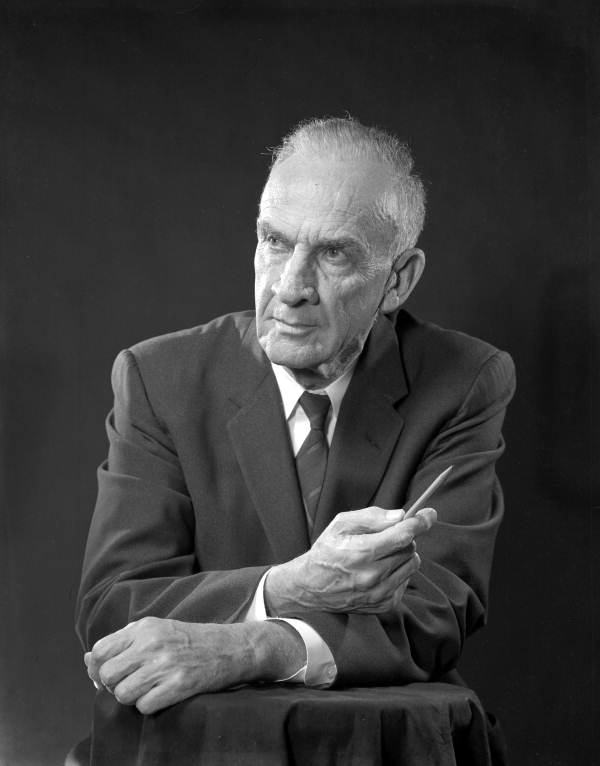
- Rogers in the 1960s
- Born: February 4, 1894; Virginia, U.S.
- Died: July 11, 1975 (aged 81); Tallahassee, Florida, U.S.
- Education: Davidson College; University of Virginia
- Occupation: Academic

William Hudson Rogers (February 4, 1894 – July 11, 1975) was an American academic.

== Life and career ==
Rogers was born in Virginia, a son of Rev. David P. Rogers and Lizzie Rogers. He attended Davidson College, earning his bachelor's degree in 1913. He also attended the University of Virginia, earning his master's degree in 1916. He interrupted his doctoral studies to volunteer for service in World War I. He joined S.S.U. 517, the first university unit of the United States Army Ambulance Service, and left for France on August 2, 1916. On July 4, 1918, the French Army awarded Rogers the Croix de Guerre for conspicuous bravery.

After his discharge, Rogers returned to the University of Virginia, earning his Doctor of Philosophy degree in English studies in 1922.

Rogers served as a professor in the department of English at Florida State University from 1922 to 1964. In 1956 he was named a distinguished professor. In 1965 a new residence hall at Florida State University was named in his honor.

== Death ==
Rogers died on July 11, 1975, in Tallahassee, Florida, at the age of 81.
