= Nell Foster Rogers =

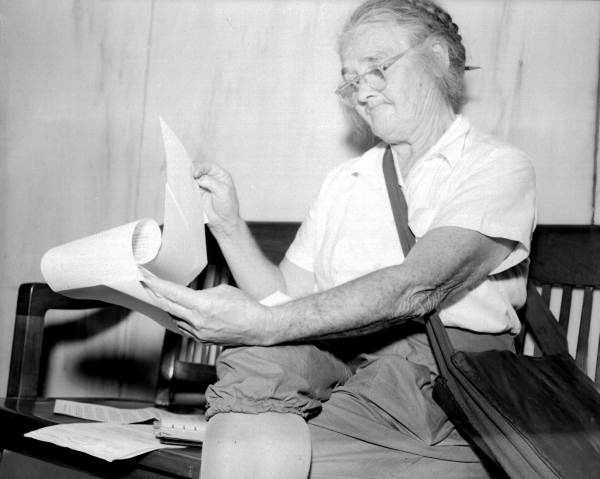
- Nell Foster Rogers in 1953
- Born: Nell Foster; 1886
- Died: 1974 (aged 87–88)
- Occupation: Lobbyist
- Spouse: Guy Fred Rogers (m. 1914; died in 1952)

Nell Foster Rogers (1886-1974) of Gainesville, Florida, affectionately known as the 'Bloomer Girl', was a "people's lobbyist for better government" (also referred to as people's lobbyist) and Florida legislative icon for nearly 30 years. Rogers was the first woman to graduate in agriculture from Oklahoma Agricultural and Mechanical College, where, as a student, she campaigned for woman's suffrage, thus beginning her lifelong cause as an activist. In 1947, she traveled to Tallahassee to oppose a bill requiring rabies inoculations for dogs. This marked the beginning of her long career as a watchdog over Florida's government.

From 1947 to 1974, Rogers attended every regular session and almost all committee hearings—defraying her expenses. She read all of the bills before the legislature and made well-reasoned recommendations for the members, which she would type on a single-page digest. Individual members would often seek her out for advice.

Rogers was never seen in the Capitol not wearing a man's shirt, knickers, and sneakers. In a 1959 interview, she said "Comfort is most important. I stopped wearing dresses 32 years ago and my disposition improved several hundred percent. You can't think if you're not comfortable."

She always spoke from the public point of view and never of her personal interests. Former Speaker of the Florida House of Representatives Ralph Turlington said of Ms. Rogers "of all the people I have known in my public life, she is one of the most, if not the most, unique, ethical and memorable." In 1969, the Florida Senate passed a resolution honoring her as "a true champion of the people." The House of Representatives did the same in 1973, where the members gave her a standing ovation and allowed her to address the chamber from the 'well.' Speaker Turlington said of the event "I was a member of The House for 24 years, and [she] was the only person then, and perhaps ever, to be honored in this special way."

Rogers died in 1974 at the age of 87.
