= USS Tallahassee =

Only one ship of the United States Navy has been named USS Tallahassee, after the city of Tallahassee, Florida, but two others were projected to carry the name.

- The first USS Tallahassee (BM-9) was an Arkansas-class monitor used as a submarine tender during World War I, originally named USS Florida and later redesignated IX-16.
- The second USS Tallahassee (CL-61) was converted from a Cleveland-class light cruiser to the Independence-class aircraft carrier USS Princeton (CVL-23) before launching.
- The third USS Tallahassee (CL-116) was a Fargo-class light cruiser that was cancelled before launching.
