= Larry Taylor (footballer) =

English footballer

Personal information
- Full name: Lawrence Desmond Taylor
- Date of birth: 23 November 1947 (age 78)
- Place of birth: Exeter, England
- Position: Goalkeeper

Youth career
- Bristol Rovers

Senior career*
Years	Team	Apps	(Gls)
1965–1970	Bristol Rovers	90	(0)
1970–1976	Chelmsford City	155	(0)
Total		245	(0)
- * Club domestic league appearances and goals

Lawrence Desmond Taylor (born 23 November 1947) is an English former footballer who played as a goalkeeper.

== Career ==
Taylor began his career at Bristol Rovers in 1965, making 90 Football League appearances for the club over the course of five years. In 1970, Taylor signed for Chelmsford City, where he played until 1976, making 234 appearances in all competitions.
