= National College for DUI Defense =

Non-profit corporation

- Abbreviation: NCDD
- Formation: 1994
- Founded at: Chicago
- Type: Non-profit corporation
- Region served: United States
- Official language: English

The National College for DUI Defense (NCDD) is a professional, non-profit corporation dedicated to the improvement of the criminal defense bar, and to the dissemination of information to the public about drunk driving law and related issues. With almost 1700 attorney members nationwide, the organization consists of a dean, a governing board of regents, a founding membership, a sustaining membership and a general membership, and is headquartered in Montgomery, Alabama. Additionally, there is a State Delegate selected for each state.

== History and purpose ==
The College was founded in 1994 in Chicago by 12 DUI defense attorneys, who formed the original Board of Regents. Subsequently, each served as dean of the college for one year prior to automatically retiring from the board as a fellow of the National College. As the original board retired, new Regents were brought in to serve.

The college's mission statement states that "In sum, the mission of the College is to vindicate the promise of the United States Constitution, that a citizen accused has the right to the effective assistance of his or her counsel". As part of this mission, the College presents seminars to the profession on a regular basis. These include a 3-day summer session conducted annually at the Harvard Law School since 1995; a 3-day fall seminar in Las Vegas, Nevada, in conjunction with the National Association of Criminal Defense Lawyers; a spring Mastering Scientific Evidence seminar in New Orleans, and a 2-day winter seminar at changing locations.

== Accreditation ==
In 1999, the college instituted board certification to recognize lawyers within the college who exemplify the program's standards, and who meet the criteria established by the board: extensive experience trying DUI cases and litigating pre-trial issues, a broad knowledge of the science involved in testing for intoxicants, and a command of the legal process on which DUI cases are framed. In 2003, the American Bar Association recognized DUI Defense Law as a specialty area in the practice of law, and awarded its "Certificate of Accreditation" to the board certification program. In 2008, the American Bar Association re-accredited the National College's specialty certification program in DUI Defense Law. The NCDD is currently the only organization in the country accredited to certify lawyers as DUI Defense Law specialists.

== Faculty ==
James O. Ruane serves as the Connecticut State Delegate to the National College for DUI Defense (NCDD) and has served on its faculty.
