= 2002 Tennessee Titans season =

43rd season in franchise history; last AFC Championship appearance until 2019

- Owner: Bud Adams
- General manager: Floyd Reese
- Head coach: Jeff Fisher
- Home stadium: The Coliseum

Results
- Record: 11–5
- Division place: 1st AFC South
- Playoffs: Won Divisional Playoffs (vs. Steelers) 34–31 (OT); Lost AFC Championship (at Raiders) 24–41
- Pro Bowlers: DE Kevin Carter

The 2002 season was the Tennessee Titans' 33rd in the National Football League and 43rd overall. The team improved upon their previous season's output of 7–9, managing eleven victories. After starting 1–4, the Titans won 10 of their next 11 games. They qualified for the playoffs with a first-round bye, but were unable to reach the Super Bowl, losing to the Oakland Raiders in the AFC Championship. The Titans would not return to the AFC Championship again until 2019.

The season also marked the first time that the Titans would return to Houston, in a week 17 match against the Texans since relocating 5 years earlier.

As of 2025, this was the last time the Titans won a home playoff game, having gone 0–3 since.

== Offseason ==
Signings	Departures
S Rich Coady (Rams)	DT Josh Evans (Jets)
FB Robert Holcombe (Rams)	DT Jason Fisk (Chargers)
FS Lance Schulters (49ers)	C Bruce Matthews (retired)
	OLB Eddie Robinson (Bills)

=== NFL draft ===
2002 Tennessee Titans draft
Round	Pick	Player	Position	College	Notes
1	12	Albert Haynesworth *	Defensive tackle	Tennessee	from N. Y. Giants
2	45	Tank Williams	Safety	Stanford	
3	77	Rocky Calmus	Linebacker	Oklahoma	
4	110	Mike Echols	Cornerback	Wisconsin	from N. Y. Giants
4	115	Tony Beckham	Cornerback	UW–Stout	
4	133	Rocky Boiman	Linebacker	Notre Dame	
5	151	Jake Schifino	Wide receiver	Akron	
6	187	Justin Hartwig	Center	Kansas	
7	225	Darrell Hill	Wide receiver	NIU	
7	240	Carlos Hall	Defensive end	Arkansas	from Green Bay
Made roster * Made at least one Pro Bowl during career

=== Undrafted free agents ===
2002 undrafted free agents of note
Player	Position	College
Kevin Aldridge	Defensive end	SMU
Nate Brady	Tight end	Chattanooga
Kyle Benn	Center	Washington
Antuian Bradford	Linebacker	Vanderbilt
Marion Bush	Defensive tackle	UAB
Dedrick Dewalt	Wide receiver	Boston College
Orlando Iglesias	Wide receiver	Houston
Nate Jackson	Safety	Hawaii
Joe Judge	Safety	McNeese State
Brad Kassell	Linebacker	North Texas
Matt Martin	Guard	Kansas State
Dicenzo Miller	Running back	Mississippi State
Nate Morrow	Linebacker	Vanderbilt
Billy Newman	Safety	Washington State
John Simon	Running back	Louisiana Tech
Marcus Smith	Cornerback	Memphis
Ryan Watson	Defensive tackle	Appalachian State

== Personnel ==
=== Coaching staff ===
2002 Tennessee Titans staff
Front office: Founder/owner/chairman of the board/CEO – Bud Adams; President/chief operating officer – Jeff Diamond; Executive VP/general manager/director of football operations – Floyd Reese; Director of player personnel – Rich Snead; Director of college scouting – Mike Ackerley; National coordinator of college scouting – C. O. Brocato; Head coaches: Executive vice president/head coach – Jeff Fisher; Assistant head coach/offense – George Henshaw; Assistant head coach/linebackers – Gunther Cunningham; Offensive coaches: Offensive coordinator – Mike Heimerdinger; Quarterbacks – Craig Johnson; Running backs – Sherman Smith; Wide receivers – Steve Walters; Offensive line – Mike Munchak; Offensive assistant/quality control – Ned James	Defensive coaches: Defensive coordinator – Jim Schwartz; Defensive line – Jim Washburn; Defensive backs – Everett Withers; Defensive assistant/quality control – Chuck Cecil; Special teams coaches: Special teams – Alan Lowry; Strength and conditioning: Strength and conditioning – Steve Watterson; Assistant strength and conditioning – Sammy Cribb

=== Roster ===
2002 Tennessee Titans roster
Quarterbacks (QB): 9 Steve McNair; 14 Neil O'Donnell; 7 Billy Volek; Running backs (RB): 34 Greg Comella FB; 27 Eddie George; 20 Mike Green; 35 Robert Holcombe; 45 John Simon; Wide receivers (WR): 83 Drew Bennett; 82 Eddie Berlin KR; 80 Darrell Hill; 85 Derrick Mason PR; 86 Justin McCareins; 81 Chris Sanders; Tight ends (TE): 88 Erron Kinney; 84 Shad Meier; 89 Frank Wycheck	Offensive linemen (OL): 67 Tom Ackerman G; 64 Gennaro DiNapoli C; 77 Justin Hartwig G; 72 Brad Hopkins T; 68 Matt Martin T; 76 Jason Mathews T; 71 Fred Miller T; 75 Benji Olson G; 69 Zach Piller G; Defensive linemen (DL): 93 Kevin Carter DE; 92 Henry Ford DT; 97 Carlos Hall DE; 91 Albert Haynesworth DT; 90 Jevon Kearse DE; 98 Robaire Smith DT; 94 Juqua Thomas DE; 78 John Thornton DE/DT	Linebackers (LB): 50 Rocky Boiman OLB; 53 Keith Bulluck OLB; 54 Rocky Calmus MLB; 57 Frank Chamberlin MLB; 56 Randall Godfrey MLB; 55 Brad Kassell OLB; 59 Peter Sirmon OLB; Defensive backs (DB): 24 Tony Beckham CB; 29 Rich Coady FS; 22 Andre Dyson CB; 30 Donald Mitchell CB; 28 Aric Morris SS; 21 Samari Rolle CB; 31 Lance Schulters FS; 37 Dainon Sidney CB; 25 Tank Williams SS; Special teams (ST): 60 Aaron Graham LS; 15 Craig Hentrich P; 6 Joe Nedney K	Practice squad: 79 Kevin Aldridge DE; 96 James Atkins DT; 49 Chad Hayes TE; 62 Mike Malano G; Reserve: 87 Kevin Dyson WR (IR); 36 Mike Echols CB (IR); 16 Orlando Iglesias WR (NF-Inj.); 99 Kris Kocurek DT (IR); 32 Bobby Myers S (IR); -- Jake Schifino WR (IR); Rookies in italics 53 active, 6 reserve, 4 practice squad

== Preseason ==
=== Schedule ===
Week	Date	Opponent	Result	Record
1	August 10, 2002	St. Louis Rams	W 28–26	1–0
2	August 15, 2002	Oakland Raiders	W 24–14	2–0
3	August 23, 2002	at Minnesota Vikings	L 10–14	2–1
4	August 30, 2002	at Green Bay Packers	L 20–21	2–2

== Regular season ==
Under the NFL's divisional realignment, the Titans were moved from the AFC Central, where they had played since the NFL–AFL merger in 1970, into the new AFC South. In addition to their home and away games with AFC South opponents, the Titans in 2002 played games against the AFC North and NFC East according to the league's new schedule rotation. They also played one game each against the Patriots and the Raiders based upon standings from 2001.

=== Schedule ===
Week	Date	Opponent	Result	TV	Time (CT)	Record	Attendance
1	September 8	Philadelphia Eagles	**W** 27–24	FOX	12:00 pm	1–0	68,804
2	September 15	at Dallas Cowboys	**L** 13–21	CBS	12:00 pm	1–1	62,527
3	September 22	Cleveland Browns	**L** 28–31 (OT)	CBS	12:00 pm	1–2	68,804
4	September 29	at Oakland Raiders	**L** 25–52	CBS	3:15 pm	1–3	58,719
5	October 6	Washington Redskins	**L** 14–31	FOX	12:00 pm	1–4	68,804
6	October 13	**Jacksonville Jaguars**	**W** 23–14	CBS	3:15 pm	2–4	68,804
7	Bye						
8	October 27	at Cincinnati Bengals	**W** 30–24	CBS	12:00 pm	3–4	52,822
9	November 3	at **Indianapolis Colts**	**W** 23–15	CBS	12:00 pm	4–4	56,752
10	November 10	**Houston Texans**	**W** 17–10	CBS	12:00 pm	5–4	68,804
11	November 17	Pittsburgh Steelers	**W** 31–23	CBS	12:00 pm	6–4	68,804
12	November 24	at Baltimore Ravens	**L** 12–13	CBS	12:00 pm	6–5	69,365
13	December 1	at New York Giants	**W** 32–29 (OT)	CBS	12:00 pm	7–5	78,640
14	December 8	**Indianapolis Colts**	**W** 27–17	CBS	12:00 pm	8–5	68,804
15	December 16	New England Patriots	**W** 24–7	ABC	8:08 pm	9–5	68,809
16	December 22	at **Jacksonville Jaguars**	**W** 28–10	CBS	12:00 pm	10–5	51,033
17	December 29	at **Houston Texans**	**W** 13–3	CBS	12:00 pm	11–5	70,694

Note: Division opponents are in bold text.

=== Game summaries ===
==== Week 1: vs. Philadelphia Eagles ====
Week 1: Philadelphia Eagles at Tennessee Titans

Quarter	1	2	3	4	Total
Eagles	14	10	0	0	**24**
**Titans**	7	3	3	14	**27**

at The Coliseum, Nashville, Tennessee

- Date: September 8, 2002
- Game time: 12:00 PM
- Game weather: Hot and Hazy, 83 °F (28.3 °C)
- Game attendance: 68,804
- Referee: Terry McAulay (77)
- TV announcers (FOX): Dick Stockton and Daryl Johnston
- Recap, Game Book

Game information

**First quarter'**

- TEN – Eddie George 14-yard pass from Steve McNair (Joe Nedney kick), 7:10. Titans 7-0. **Drive: 8 plays, 80 yards, 5:19.**
- PHI – James Thrash 18-yard pass from Donovan McNabb (David Akers kick), 5:20. Tied 7-7. **Drive: 2 plays, 6 yards, 0:53.**
- PHI – Duce Staley 7-yard pass from Donovan McNabb (David Akers kick), 2:36. Eagles 14-7. **Drive: 6 plays, 61 yards, 2:44.**

**Second quarter**

- TEN – Joe Nedney 33-yard field goal, 11:00. Eagles 14-10. **Drive: 10 plays, 75 yards, 6:36.**
- PHI – Chad Lewis 7-yard pass from Donovan McNabb (David Akers kick), 5:05. Eagles 21-10. **Drive: 11 plays, 80 yards, 5:55.**
- PHI – David Akers 30-yard field goal, 0:48. Eagles 24-10. **Drive: 4 plays, 18 yards, 1:00.**

**Third quarter**

- TEN – Joe Nedney 47-yard field goal, 11:06. Eagles 24-13. **Drive: 8 plays, 51 yards, 3:54.**

**Fourth quarter**

- TEN – Justin McCareins 2-yard pass from Steve McNair (2PT run failed), 12:49. Eagles 24-19. **Drive: 6 plays, 67 yards, 2:21.**
- TEN – Eddie George 2-yard run (Eddie George run), 3:09. Titans 27-24. **Drive: 14 plays, 84 yards, 5:41.**

**Top passers**

- PHI – Donovan McNabb – 18/36, 212 yards, 3 TD, 2 INT
- TEN – Steve McNair – 24/34, 269 yards, 2 TD, INT

**Top rushers**

- PHI – Brian Westbrook – 8 rushes, 42 yards
- TEN – Eddie George – 18 rushes, 42 yards, TD

**Top receivers**

- PHI – Antonio Freeman – 3 receptions, 54 yards
- TEN – Derrick Mason – 7 receptions, 109 yards

==== Week 2: at Dallas Cowboys ====
Week 2: Tennessee Titans at Dallas Cowboys

Quarter	1	2	3	4	Total
Titans	7	3	0	3	**13**
**Cowboys**	0	7	7	7	**21**

at Texas Stadium, Irving, Texas

- Date: September 15, 2002
- Game time: 12:00 PM
- Game weather: Cloudy skies, 81 °F (27.2 °C)
- Game attendance: 62,527
- Referee: Ed Hochuli (85)
- TV announcers (CBS): Kevin Harlan and Randy Cross
- Recap, Game Book

Game information

**First quarter'**

- TEN – Frank Wycheck 1-yard pass from Steve McNair (Joe Nedney kick), 0:00. Titans 7-0. **Drive: 12 plays, 85 yards, 8:27.**

**Second quarter**

- DAL – Tony McGee 17-yard pass from Quincy Carter (Billy Cundiff kick), 12:00. Tied 7-7. **Drive: 6 plays, 71 yards, 3:00.**
- TEN – Joe Nedney 37-yard field goal, 5:31. Titans 10-7. **Drive: 13 plays, 55 yards, 6:29.**

**Third quarter**

- DAL – Dexter Coakley 52-yard interception return (Billy Cundiff kick), 3:10. Cowboys 14-10.

**Fourth quarter**

- DAL – Joey Galloway 38-yard pass from Quincy Carter (Billy Cundiff kick), 11:25. Cowboys 21-10. **Drive: 7 plays, 95 yards, 3:22.**
- TEN – Joe Nedney 53-yard field goal, 5:18. Cowboys 21-13. **Drive: 8 plays, 28 yards, 2:36.**

**Top passers**

- TEN – Steve McNair – 20/38, 226 yards, TD, INT
- DAL – Quincy Carter – 14/24, 240 yards, 2 TD

**Top rushers**

- TEN – Eddie George – 19 rushes, 65 yards
- DAL – Emmitt Smith – 18 rushes, 59 yards

**Top receivers**

- TEN – Derrick Mason – 7 receptions, 118 yards
- DAL – Joey Galloway – 5 receptions, 88 yards, TD

==== Week 15: vs. New England Patriots ====
Week 15: New England Patriots (8–5) at Tennessee Titans (8–5) – Game summary

Quarter	1	2	3	4	Total
Patriots	0	0	7	0	**7**
**Titans**	0	14	7	3	**24**

at The Coliseum, Nashville, Tennessee

- Date: December 16, 2002
- Game time: 9:00 pm
- Game weather: Cloudy, 57 °F (13.9 °C)
- Game attendance: 68,809
- Referee: Ron Winter (14)
- TV announcers (ABC): Al Michaels, John Madden and Melissa Stark
- Recap, Game Book

Game information

**Second quarter**

- TEN – Steve McNair 11-yard run (Joe Nedney kick), 12:16. Titans 7–0. **Drive: 12 plays, 78 yards, 6:18.**
- TEN – Steve McNair 1-yard run (Joe Nedney kick), 0:32. Titans 14–0. **Drive: 12 plays, 58 yards, 6:48.**

**Third quarter**

- NE – Tom Brady 10-yard run (Adam Vinatieri kick), 13:08. Titans 14–7. **Drive: 6 plays, 69 yards, 1:52.**
- TEN – Rich Coady 24-yard interception return (Joe Nedney kick), 9:58. Titans 21–7.

**Fourth quarter**

- TEN – Joe Nedney 28-yard field goal, 9:22. Titans 24–7. **Drive: 15 plays, 69 yards, 9:24.**

**Top passers**

- NE – Tom Brady – 14/29, 134 yards, INT
- TEN – Steve McNair – 11/24, 136 yards, INT

**Top rushers**

- NE – Antowain Smith – 6 rushes, 31 yards
- TEN – Eddie George – 31 rushes, 101 yards

**Top receivers**

- NE – Troy Brown – 8 receptions, 73 yards
- TEN – Derrick Mason – 6 receptions, 86 yards

=== Standings ===
==== Division ====
AFC South
	W	L	T	PCT	DIV	CONF	PF	PA	STK
^{(2)} Tennessee Titans	11	5	0	.688	6–0	9–3	367	324	W5
^{(5)} Indianapolis Colts	10	6	0	.625	4–2	8–4	349	313	W1
Jacksonville Jaguars	6	10	0	.375	1–5	4–8	328	315	L2
Houston Texans	4	12	0	.250	1–5	2–10	213	356	L3

==== Conference ====
AFC
#	Team	Division	W	L	T	PCT	DIV	CONF	SOS	SOV
**Division leaders**
1 (Note: Oakland finished ahead of Tennessee based on head-to-head victory.)	Oakland Raiders	West	11	5	0	.688	4–2	9–3	.529	.531
2	Tennessee Titans	South	11	5	0	.688	6–0	9–3	.479	.474
3	Pittsburgh Steelers	North	10	5	1	.656	6–0	8–4	.486	.451
4 (Note: N.Y. Jets finished ahead of New England based on win percentage in common games (8–4 to 7–5) after both finished ahead of Miami based on division record (4–2 to 2–4).)	New York Jets	East	9	7	0	.563	4–2	6–6	.500	.500
**Wild Cards**
5	Indianapolis Colts	South	10	6	0	.625	4–2	8–4	.479	.400
6 (Note: Cleveland finished ahead of Denver and New England based on conference record (7–5 vs 5–7/6–6))	Cleveland Browns	North	9	7	0	.563	3–3	7–5	.486	.413
**Did not qualify for the postseason**
7 (Note: Denver finished ahead of New England based on head-to-head victory.)	Denver Broncos	West	9	7	0	.563	3–3	5–7	.527	.486
8 (Note: New England finished ahead of Miami based on division record (4–2 to 2–4).)	New England Patriots	East	9	7	0	.563	4–2	6–6	.525	.455
9	Miami Dolphins	East	9	7	0	.563	2–4	7–5	.508	.486
10 (Note: Buffalo finished ahead of San Diego based on head-to-head victory.)	Buffalo Bills	East	8	8	0	.500	2–4	5–7	.473	.352
11 (Note: San Diego finished ahead of Kansas City based on division record (3–3 to 2–4).)	San Diego Chargers	West	8	8	0	.500	3–3	6–6	.492	.453
12	Kansas City Chiefs	West	8	8	0	.500	2–4	6–6	.527	.516
13	Baltimore Ravens	North	7	9	0	.438	3–3	7–5	.506	.384
14	Jacksonville Jaguars	South	6	10	0	.375	1–5	4–8	.506	.438
15	Houston Texans	South	4	12	0	.250	1–5	2–10	.518	.492
16	Cincinnati Bengals	North	2	14	0	.125	0–6	1–11	.537	.406
**Tiebreakers** (Note: When breaking ties for three or more teams under the NFL's rules, they are first broken within divisions, then comparing only the highest ranked remaining team from each division.)

== Playoffs ==
Week	Date	Opponent	Result	Attendance
Divisional	January 11, 2003	Pittsburgh Steelers	W 34–31 (OT)	68,809
Conference Championship	January 19, 2003	at Oakland Raiders	L 24–41	62,544

=== AFC Divisional Playoff vs Pittsburgh Steelers ===
Tennessee Titans 34, Pittsburgh Steelers 31

Quarter	1	2	3	4	OT	Total
Steelers	0	13	7	11	0	31
Titans	14	0	14	3	3	34

at Adelphia Coliseum, Nashville, Tennessee

- Game time: 4:30 pm EST
- Game weather: Sunny, 34 °F (1.1 °C)
- Game attendance: 68,809
- Referee: Ron Blum
- TV announcers (CBS): Dick Enberg, Dan Dierdorf, and Bonnie Bernstein

This was the Titans' first franchise playoff win over the Steelers in four attempts, following three losses as the Oilers in 1978, 1979 and 1989, the last of which was also in overtime.

=== AFC Championship Game ===
Oakland Raiders 41, Tennessee Titans 24

Quarter	1	2	3	4	Total
Titans	7	10	7	0	24
Raiders	14	10	3	14	41

at Network Associates Coliseum, Oakland, California

- Game time: 6:30 p.m. EST/3:30 p.m. PST
- Game weather: Clear, 52 °F (11.1 °C)
- Game attendance: 62,544
- Referee: Ed Hochuli
- TV announcers (CBS): Greg Gumbel, Phil Simms, Armen Keteyian and Bonnie Bernstein

This was the Titans' last AFC Championship Game appearance until 2019.
