= 2002 Indianapolis Colts season =

50th season in franchise history; first one in the AFC South division

- Owner: Jim Irsay
- General manager: Bill Polian
- Head coach: Tony Dungy
- Home stadium: RCA Dome

Results
- Record: 10–6
- Division place: 2nd AFC South
- Playoffs: Lost Wild Card Playoffs (at Jets) 0–41
- Pro Bowlers: QB Peyton Manning; WR Marvin Harrison

Uniform
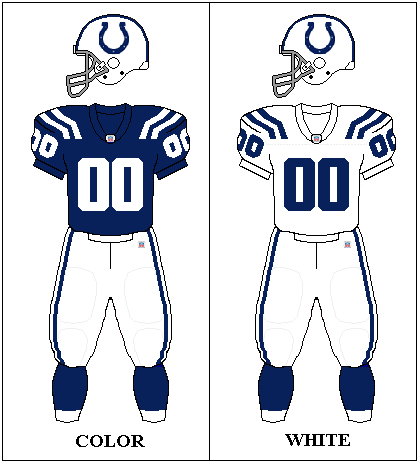

The 2002 season was the Indianapolis Colts' 50th in the National Football League (NFL) and 19th in Indianapolis. The Colts made it to the playoffs after a one-year absence, improving upon their 6–10 record from the 2001 season. This was the first of nine consecutive playoff appearances for the Colts. The 2002 season marked the first for the Colts in the newly formed AFC South after competing for 32 seasons in the AFC East. The season is memorable for the team hiring former Tampa Bay Buccaneers coach Tony Dungy. He would later take the Colts to a victory in Super Bowl XLI after a successful 2006 season.

In the Wildcard round, the Colts were soundly embarrassed by the New York Jets, as they ended up losing the game 41–0. The Jets would go on to lose to the eventual AFC champion Oakland Raiders the following week.

== Offseason ==
Signings	Departures
CB Walt Harris (Bears)	TE Ken Dilger (Buccaneers)
WR Troy Walters (Vikings)	SS Chad Cota (Rams)
QB Brock Huard (Seahawks)	WR Tony Simmons (Texans)
WR Qadry Ismail (Ravens)	WR Terrence Wilkins (Rams)
FB Detron Smith (Broncos)	CB Jeff Burris (Bengals)
	WR Jerome Pathon (Saints)
	DT Ellis Johnson (Falcons)
	G Steve McKinney (Texans)
	G Larry Moore (Redskins)

=== NFL draft ===
2002 Indianapolis Colts draft
Round	Pick	Player	Position	College	Notes
1	11	Dwight Freeney * ^{†}	Defensive end	Syracuse	
2	42	Larry Tripplett	Defensive tackle	Washington	
3	74	Joseph Jefferson	Defensive back	Western Kentucky	
4	106	David Thornton	Linebacker	North Carolina	
6	182	David Pugh	Defensive tackle	Virginia Tech	
6	183	James Lewis	Defensive back	Miami (FL)	
6	204	Brian Allen	Running back	Stanford	
7	220	Josh Mallard	Defensive end	Georgia	
Made roster * Made at least one Pro Bowl during career

=== Undrafted free agents ===
2002 undrafted free agents of note
Player	Position	College
David Collett	Kicker	Tennessee Tech
Todd Delamielleure	Linebacker	Hofstra
Adam Herzing	Wide receiver	Cal Poly
Chris Lacy	Wide receiver	Idaho
Frank Staine-Pyne	Defensive back	Air Force
Mike Souza	Center	Northwestern
Kurt Vollers	Tackle	Notre Dame
Ricky Williams	Running Back	Texas Tech
Browning Wynn	Tight end	Virginia Tech
Greg Zolman	Quarterback	Vanderbilt

== Personnel ==
=== Staff / Coaches ===
2002 Indianapolis Colts staff
Front office: Owner and chief executive officer – Jim Irsay; President – Bill Polian; Senior executive vice president – Pete Ward; Executive vice president – Bob Terpening; Director of football operations – Dom Anile; Director of pro player personnel – Clyde Powers; Assistant director of football operations – Chris Polian; Director of player development – Steve Champlin; Coordinator of player personnel – John Becker; Director of college scouting – Mike Butler; Head coaches: Head coach – Tony Dungy; Offensive coaches: Offensive coordinator – Tom Moore; Quarterbacks – Jim Caldwell; Running backs – Gene Huey; Wide receivers – Clyde Christensen; Tight ends – Chris Foerster; Offensive line – Howard Mudd; Offensive quality control – Ricky Thomas	Defensive coaches: Defensive coordinator – Ron Meeks; Defensive line – John Teerlinck; Linebackers – Mike Murphy; Defensive backs – Alan Williams; Defensive quality control – Diron Reynolds; Special teams coaches: Special teams – Russ Purnell; Strength and conditioning: Strength and conditioning – Jon Torine; Assistant strength and conditioning – Richard Howell

=== Roster ===
2002 Indianapolis Colts roster
Quarterbacks (QB): 7 Brock Huard; 18 Peyton Manning; Running backs (RB): 36 Jim Finn FB; 32 Edgerrin James; 23 James Mungro; 42 Detron Smith FB; 35 Ricky Williams; Wide receivers (WR): 84 Drew Haddad; 88 Marvin Harrison; 15 Adam Herzing; 86 Troy Walters; 87 Reggie Wayne; Tight ends (TE): 80 Joe Dean Davenport; 81 Marcus Pollard; 85 Mike Roberg	Offensive linemen (OL): 64 Rick DeMulling G; 71 Ryan Diem G; 78 Tarik Glenn T; 74 Waverly Jackson G/T; 73 Adam Meadows T; 61 Rob Murphy C/G; 56 Tupe Peko C/G; 63 Jeff Saturday C; Defensive linemen (DL): 92 Chad Bratzke DE; 79 Raheem Brock DE; 97 James Cannida DT; 93 Dwight Freeney DE; 68 Josh Mallard DE; 91 Chukie Nwokorie DE; 95 David Pugh DT; 99 Brad Scioli DE/DT; 75 Larry Tripplett DT; 96 Josh Williams DT	Linebackers (LB): 94 Rob Morris MLB; 52 Mike Peterson OLB; 98 Sam Sword OLB; 52 Donnel Thompson MLB; 50 David Thornton OLB; 53 Marcus Washington OLB; Defensive backs (DB): 28 Idrees Bashir FS; 31 Clifton Crosby CB; 34 Jason Doering S; 26 David Gibson SS; 25 Nick Harper CB; 21 Walt Harris CB; 29 Joseph Jefferson CB/S; 40 Brian Leigeb FS; 27 David Macklin CB; 37 Eric Vance SS; 20 Joe Walker FS; Special teams (ST): 17 Hunter Smith P; 48 Justin Snow LS; 13 Mike Vanderjagt K	Practice squad: -- Matt Anderle T; -- Herbert Goodman RB; 72 Brandon Hicks DT; 55 J.R. Johnson LB; 67 Hans Olsen G; Reserve: 16 Troy Albea WR (IR); 43 Brian Allen RB (IR); 41 Cory Bird S (IR); 47 Jermaine Hampton CB (PUP); 83 Qadry Ismail WR (IR); 65 Curt McGill C (IR); 33 Dominic Rhodes RB (IR); 30 Shyrone Stith RB (IR); Rookies in italics 53 active, 8 reserve, 5 practice squad

== Preseason ==
Week	Date	Opponent	Result	Record	Venue	Recap
1	August 10	at Seattle Seahawks	W 28–10	1–0	Qwest Field	Recap
2	August 20	Cincinnati Bengals	L 10–22	1–1	RCA Dome	Recap
3	August 24	Buffalo Bills	W 19–7	2–1	RCA Dome	Recap
4	August 30	at New Orleans Saints	L 21–25	2–2	Louisiana Superdome	Recap

== Regular season ==
=== Schedule ===
Week	Date	Opponent	Result	Record	Venue	Recap
1	September 8	at Jacksonville Jaguars	W 28–25	1–0	Alltel Stadium	Recap
2	September 15	Miami Dolphins	L 13–21	1–1	RCA Dome	Recap
3	September 22	at Houston Texans	W 23–3	2–1	Reliant Stadium	Recap
4	Bye					
5	October 6	Cincinnati Bengals	W 28–21	3–1	RCA Dome	Recap
6	October 13	Baltimore Ravens	W 22–20	4–1	RCA Dome	Recap
7	October 21	at Pittsburgh Steelers	L 10–28	4–2	Heinz Field	Recap
8	October 27	at Washington Redskins	L 21–26	4–3	FedExField	Recap
9	November 3	Tennessee Titans	L 15–23	4–4	RCA Dome	Recap
10	November 10	at Philadelphia Eagles	W 35–13	5–4	Veterans Stadium	Recap
11	November 17	Dallas Cowboys	W 20–3	6–4	RCA Dome	Recap
12	November 24	at Denver Broncos	W 23–20	7–4	Invesco Field at Mile High	Recap
13	December 1	Houston Texans	W 19–3	8–4	RCA Dome	Recap
14	December 8	at Tennessee Titans	L 17–27	8–5	Adelphia Coliseum	Recap
15	December 15	at Cleveland Browns	W 28–23	9–5	Cleveland Browns Stadium	Recap
16	December 22	New York Giants	L 27–44	9–6	RCA Dome	Recap
17	December 29	Jacksonville Jaguars	W 20–13	10–6	RCA Dome	Recap

=== Game summaries ===
==== Week 1: at Jacksonville Jaguars ====
Week 1: Indianapolis Colts at Jacksonville Jaguars – Game summary

Quarter	1	2	3	4	Total
Colts	7	7	7	7	28
Jaguars	0	7	10	8	25

at Alltel Stadium, Jacksonville, Florida

- Date: September 8
- Game time: 1:00 pm EST/12:00 pm CST
- Game weather: 85°, Sunny
- Game attendance: 56,595
- Referee: Bernie Kukar
- TV announcers (CBS): Kevin Harlan, Randy Cross, and Beasley Reece

In the 2002 season, the Colts and Jaguars faced off for the first time as divisional rivals in their season opener on September 8 in Jacksonville. The Colts initiated the scoring with a touchdown in the first quarter. The Jaguars tied it in the second quarter. In the final minutes of the second quarter, Mark Brunell threw a 40–yard pick–six to LB Marcus Washington. The Jaguars then missed a 52–yard field goal attempt, resulting in a halftime score of 14–7 in favor of the Colts. In the third quarter, a fumble by Colts RB Edgerrin James led to a Jaguars' field goal, followed by another fumble from Colts TE Marcus Pollard that led to a Jaguars touchdown, giving them the lead. However, after the Jaguars forced a Colts three–and–out, return specialist Damon Gibson mishandled the catch, allowing Colts DB Clifton Crosby to recover the ball at Jacksonville's 19–yard line. The Colts capitalized on this opportunity, scoring a touchdown to regain the lead. In the fourth quarter, the Colts added another touchdown to widen their advantage. The Jaguars mounted a lengthy drive, scoring a touchdown and converting a two–point attempt to narrow the Colts' lead. The Colts effectively managed the Jaguars' timeouts, leaving them with the ball and about a minute remaining. The Jaguars advanced to the Colts' 46–yard line but ultimately ran out of time, resulting in a 28–25 victory for the Colts.

==== Week 2: vs. Miami Dolphins ====
Week 2: Miami Dolphins (1–0) at Indianapolis Colts (1–0) – Game summary

Quarter	1	2	3	4	Total
Dolphins	14	7	0	0	21
Colts	0	3	0	10	13

at RCA Dome, Indianapolis, Indiana

- Date: September 15, 2002
- Game time: 1:00 pm
- Game weather: None (indoor stadium)
- Game attendance: 56,650
- Referee: Walt Coleman (65)
- TV announcers (CBS): Ian Eagle, Solomon Wilcots
- Recap, Game Book

Game information

First quarter

- MIA – Jay Fiedler 1-yard run (Olindo Mare kick), 9:34. Dolphins 7–0. Drive: 9 plays, 73 yards, 5:26.
- MIA – Rob Konrad 9-yard pass from Jay Fiedler (Olindo Mare kick), 2:18. Dolphins 14–0. Drive: 7 plays, 49 yards, 3:33.

Second quarter

- IND – Mike Vanderjagt 25-yard field goal, 4:03. Dolphins 14–3. Drive: 15 plays, 74 yards, 8:18.
- MIA – Ricky Williams 10-yard pass from Jay Fiedler (Olindo Mare kick), 1:53. Dolphins 21–3. Drive: 4 plays, 71 yards, 2:10.

Third quarter

- No scoring plays.

Fourth quarter

- IND – Marvin Harrison 16-yard pass from Peyton Manning (Mike Vanderjagt kick), 9:11. Dolphins 21–10. Drive: 8 plays, 80 yards, 3:29.
- IND – Mike Vanderjagt 23-yard field goal, 2:54. Dolphins 21–13. Drive: 13 plays, 71 yards, 3:19.

Top passers

- MIA – Jay Fiedler – 13/18, 187 yards, 2 TD, INT
- IND – Peyton Manning – 26/45, 289 yards, TD, 3 INT

Top rushers

- MIA – Ricky Williams – 24 rushes, 132 yards
- IND – Edgerrin James – 30 rushes, 138 yards

Top receivers

- MIA – Ricky Williams – 2 receptions, 62 yards, TD
- IND – Marvin Harrison – 11 receptions, 144 yards, TD

==== Week 17: vs. Jacksonville Jaguars ====
Week 17: Jacksonville Jaguars at Indianapolis Colts – Game summary

Quarter	1	2	3	4	Total
Jaguars	3	7	0	3	13
Colts	0	10	0	10	20

at RCA Dome, Indianapolis, Indiana

- Date: December 29
- Game time: 4:05 pm EST/3:05 pm CST
- Game weather: None (indoor stadium)
- Game attendance: 56,755
- Referee: Jeff Triplette
- TV announcers (CBS): Gus Johnson, Brent Jones
- Recap, Game Book

Game information

First quarter

- JAX – Danny Boyd 32-yard field goal, 1:58. Jaguars 3–0. Drive: 8 plays, 38 yards, 3:11.

Second quarter

- IND – Mike Vanderjagt 19-yard field goal, 11:11. Tied 3–3. Drive: 11 plays, 71 yards, 5:47.
- JAX – Fred Taylor 9-yard run (Danny Boyd kick), 4:53. Jaguars 10–3. Drive: 10 plays, 74 yards, 6:18.
- IND – James Mungro 1-yard run (Mike Vanderjagt kick), 0:18. Tied 10–10. Drive: 4 plays, 23 yards, 0:43.

Third quarter

- No scoring plays.

Fourth quarter

- JAX – Danny Boyd 23-yard field goal, 13:55. Jaguars 13–10. Drive: 16 plays, 67 yards, 7:51.
- IND – Mike Vanderjagt 27-yard field goal, 5:46. Tied 13–13. Drive: 16 plays, 68 yards, 8:09.
- IND – Marcus Pollard 11-yard pass from Peyton Manning (Mike Vanderjagt kick), 2:26. Colts 20–13. Drive: 7 plays, 47 yards, 2:11.

Top passers

- JAX – David Garrard – 13/26, 135 yards
- IND – Peyton Manning – 20/28, 146 yards, TD

Top rushers

- JAX – Fred Taylor – 15 rushes, 73 yards, TD
- IND – Edgerrin James – 15 rushes, 86 yards

Top receivers

- JAX – Jimmy Smith – 3 receptions, 35 yards
- IND – Marcus Pollard – 5 receptions, 39 yards, TD

Although the Colts had lost the inaugural AFC South title to the Titans the week prior, they still had the opportunity to secure a playoff berth with a victory against the eliminated Jaguars. The Colts began the game sluggishly, but a fumble by the Jaguars at their 23–yard line enabled the Colts to score a quick touchdown, leveling the score by halftime. In the third quarter, as the Colts advanced into Jacksonville territory, James fumbled the ball, allowing the Jaguars to convert it into a field goal and take a 13–10 lead heading into the fourth quarter. On the subsequent drive, the Jaguars appeared to force a three–and–out, but a penalty for running into the kicker granted the Colts a fresh set of downs. Capitalizing on this opportunity, the Colts tied the game with a field goal. After forcing another three–and–out, a strong punt return positioned the Colts at Jacksonville's 47–yard line. Manning then connected with Pollard for an 11–yard touchdown, putting the Colts ahead. In the closing moments, the Colts' defense held firm, securing a 20–13 victory over the Jaguars, completing a sweep in their initial matchups as divisional rivals and earning a wild card spot in the playoffs.

=== Standings ===
==== Division ====
AFC South
	W	L	T	PCT	DIV	CONF	PF	PA	STK
^{(2)} Tennessee Titans	11	5	0	.688	6–0	9–3	367	324	W5
^{(5)} Indianapolis Colts	10	6	0	.625	4–2	8–4	349	313	W1
Jacksonville Jaguars	6	10	0	.375	1–5	4–8	328	315	L2
Houston Texans	4	12	0	.250	1–5	2–10	213	356	L3

==== Conference ====
AFC
#	Team	Division	W	L	T	PCT	DIV	CONF	SOS	SOV
Division leaders
1 (Note: Oakland finished ahead of Tennessee based on head-to-head victory.)	Oakland Raiders	West	11	5	0	.688	4–2	9–3	.529	.531
2	Tennessee Titans	South	11	5	0	.688	6–0	9–3	.479	.474
3	Pittsburgh Steelers	North	10	5	1	.656	6–0	8–4	.486	.451
4 (Note: N.Y. Jets finished ahead of New England based on win percentage in common games (8–4 to 7–5) after both finished ahead of Miami based on division record (4–2 to 2–4).)	New York Jets	East	9	7	0	.563	4–2	6–6	.500	.500
Wild Cards
5	Indianapolis Colts	South	10	6	0	.625	4–2	8–4	.479	.400
6 (Note: Cleveland finished ahead of Denver and New England based on conference record (7–5 vs 5–7/6–6))	Cleveland Browns	North	9	7	0	.563	3–3	7–5	.486	.413
Did not qualify for the postseason
7 (Note: Denver finished ahead of New England based on head-to-head victory.)	Denver Broncos	West	9	7	0	.563	3–3	5–7	.527	.486
8 (Note: New England finished ahead of Miami based on division record (4–2 to 2–4).)	New England Patriots	East	9	7	0	.563	4–2	6–6	.525	.455
9	Miami Dolphins	East	9	7	0	.563	2–4	7–5	.508	.486
10 (Note: Buffalo finished ahead of San Diego based on head-to-head victory.)	Buffalo Bills	East	8	8	0	.500	2–4	5–7	.473	.352
11 (Note: San Diego finished ahead of Kansas City based on division record (3–3 to 2–4).)	San Diego Chargers	West	8	8	0	.500	3–3	6–6	.492	.453
12	Kansas City Chiefs	West	8	8	0	.500	2–4	6–6	.527	.516
13	Baltimore Ravens	North	7	9	0	.438	3–3	7–5	.506	.384
14	Jacksonville Jaguars	South	6	10	0	.375	1–5	4–8	.506	.438
15	Houston Texans	South	4	12	0	.250	1–5	2–10	.518	.492
16	Cincinnati Bengals	North	2	14	0	.125	0–6	1–11	.537	.406
Tiebreakers (Note: When breaking ties for three or more teams under the NFL's rules, they are first broken within divisions, then comparing only the highest ranked remaining team from each division.)

== Postseason ==
Round	Date	Opponent (seed)	Result	Record	Venue	NFL Recap
Wild Card	January 4, 2003	at New York Jets (4)	L 0–41	0–1	Giants Stadium	Recap

=== Game summaries ===
==== AFC Wild Card Playoff Game: vs. New York Jets ====
AFC Wild Card Playoffs: (#5) Indianapolis Colts at (#4) New York Jets

Quarter	1	2	3	4	Total
Colts	0	0	0	0	0
Jets	7	17	10	7	41

at Giants Stadium, East Rutherford, New Jersey

- Date: January 4, 2003
- Game time: 4:30 pm
- Game weather: 35 °F or 1.7 °C (Cloudy)
- Game attendance: 78,524
- Referee: Tony Corrente (99)
- TV announcers (ABC): Brent Musburger and Gary Danielson
- Recap, Game Book

Game information

First quarter

- NYJ – Richie Anderson 56-yard pass from Chad Pennington (John Hall kick), 10:50. Jets 7–0. Drive: 5 plays, 77 yards, 2:27.

Second quarter

- NYJ – John Hall 41-yard field goal, 14:08. Jets 10–0. Drive: 9 plays, 46 yards, 5:34.
- NYJ – LaMont Jordan 1-yard run (John Hall kick), 9:41. Jets 17–0. Drive: 7 plays, 39 yards, 4:18.
- NYJ – Santana Moss 4-yard pass from Chad Pennington (John Hall kick), 0:37. Jets 24–0. Drive: 6 plays, 42 yards, 1:02.

Third quarter

- NYJ – John Hall 39-yard field goal, 13:28. Jets 27–0. Drive: 4 plays, −1 yard, 1:32.
- NYJ – Chris Baker 3-yard pass from Chad Pennington (John Hall kick), 1:44. Jets 34–0. Drive: 11 plays, 74 yards, 6:30.

Fourth quarter

- NYJ – LaMont Jordan 1-yard run (John Hall kick), 4:59. Jets 41–0. Drive: 13 plays, 64 yards, 9:17.

Top passers

- IND – Peyton Manning – 14/31, 137 yards, 2 INT
- NYJ – Chad Pennington – 19/25, 222 yards, 3 TD

Top rushers

- IND – James Mungro – 4 rushes, 36 yards
- NYJ – LaMont Jordan – 20 rushes, 102 yards, 2 TD

Top receivers

- IND – Marvin Harrison – 4 receptions, 47 yards
- NYJ – Richie Anderson – 2 receptions, 66 yards, TD
