= 2002 Pittsburgh Steelers season =

Pittsburgh Steelers 70th US football season

- Owner: The Rooney Family
- General manager: Kevin Colbert
- Head coach: Bill Cowher
- Home stadium: Heinz Field

Results
- Record: 10–5–1
- Division place: 1st AFC North
- Playoffs: Won Wild Card Playoffs (vs. Browns) 36–33; Lost Divisional Playoffs (at Titans) 31–34 (OT)
- All-Pros: 3: Alan Faneca (1st team); Joey Porter (1st team); Hines Ward (2nd team)
- Pro Bowlers: 4: G Alan Faneca; OLB Jason Gildon; WR Hines Ward; OLB Joey Porter
- Team MVP: Joey Porter; Hines Ward
- Team ROY: Kendall Simmons

The 2002 season was the Pittsburgh Steelers' 70th as a professional sports franchise and as a member of the National Football League.

The Steelers were coming off a 13–3 record in 2001 and making an appearance in the AFC Championship game. The team failed to improve their 13–3 record, finishing 10–5–1, although this record was good enough for a division championship. With their finish, the Steelers became the first champions of the newly created AFC North. Bill Cowher's team won the Wild Card Game, defeating the rival Cleveland Browns at home, but lost to AFC South champion Tennessee Titans in the divisional round.

Week 4 saw Kordell Stewart's final game as the Steelers' starting quarterback, as he was replaced by Tommy Maddox during the game. Even though he did relieve an injured Maddox, Stewart never regained his job as he was released following the season.

== Offseason ==
Additions	Subtractions
QB Charlie Batch (Lions)	WR Troy Edwards (Rams)
WR Terance Mathis (Falcons)	WR Bobby Shaw (Jaguars)
K Todd Peterson (Chiefs)	FS Jason Simmons (Texans)
LB James Farrior (Jets)	C Roger Duffy (retirement)
	FB Jon Witman (retirement)
	G Rich Tylski (Panthers)

=== NFL draft ===
2002 Pittsburgh Steelers draft
Round	Pick	Player	Position	College	Notes
1	30	Kendall Simmons	Guard	Auburn	
2	62	Antwaan Randle El	Wide receiver	Indiana	
3	94	Chris Hope *	Safety	Florida State	
4	128	Larry Foote	Linebacker	Michigan	
5	166	Verron Haynes	Running back	Georgia	
6	202	Lee Mays	Wide receiver	Texas El Paso	
7	212	Lavar Glover	Defensive back	Cincinnati	
7	242	Brett Keisel *	Defensive end	Brigham Young	
Made roster * Made at least one Pro Bowl during career

=== Undrafted free agents ===
2002 undrafted free agents of note
Player	Position	College
Matt Anderson	Center	Texas
Will Bouton	Linebacker	Furman
Leon Brockmeier	Tackle	Northwestern
Josh Burr	Tackle	South Dakota
Burke Dales	Punter	Concordia
Dallas Davis	Wide receiver	Colorado State
D. J. Flick	Wide receiver	Slippery Rock
Pernell Griffin	Linebacker	East Carolina
James Harrison	Linebacker	Kent State
Bary Holleyman	Defensive End	Oklahoma
Jay Johnson	Linebacker	SUNY Brockport
Bob Jones	Defensive End	Penn State
Jermese Jones	Tackle	Virginia
Antwon McRay	Running back	Toledo
Erik Totten	Safety	Western Washington
Albert Tuipulotu	Fullback	Portland State

== Personnel ==
=== Staff / Coaches ===
2002 Pittsburgh Steelers staff
Front office: President – Dan Rooney; Vice president & general counsel – Art Rooney II; Vice president – John R. McGinley; Vice president – Arthur J. Rooney, Jr.; Administration advisor – Chuck Noll; Director of business – Mark Hart; Business accounting coordinator – Jim Ellenberger; Human relations/office coordinator – Geraldine Glenn; Business operations – Omar Khan; Accounting manager – Jodie Spagnolli; Communications coordinator – Ron Wahl; Public relations/media manager – David Lockett; Website/network administrator – Scott Phelps; Marketing and merchandising; Director of marketing – Tony Quatrini; Marketing coordinator – Rick Giugliano; Merchandising manager – Tim Carey; Assistant merchandising manager – Sam Rogiero; Merchandising accounting manager – Kristen Weiland; Marketing manager – John Wodarek; Producer/broadcasting manager – Rick Fairbend; Marketing/community relations manager – Lynne Molyneaux; Marketing assistant – John Simpson; Marketing assistant – Mike Marchinsky; Ticket operations; Ticket manager – TBA; Football operations; Director of football operations – Kevin Colbert; College scouting coordinator – Bill Baker; Pro scouting coordinator – Doug Whaley; Pro/college scout – Phil Kreidler; College scout – Mark Gorscak; College scout – Bob Lane; College scout – Bruce McNorton; College scout – Dan Rooney; College scout – Bill Nunn; BLESTO Scout – Kelvin Fisher; Head coaches: Head coach – Bill Cowher; Offensive coaches: Offensive coordinator – Mike Mularkey; Quarterbacks – Tom Clements; Running backs – Dick Hoak; Wide receivers – Kenny Jackson; Tight ends – Ken Whisenhunt; Offensive line – Russ Grimm; Offensive assistant – Mike Miller	Defensive coaches: Defensive coordinator – Tim Lewis; Defensive line – John Mitchell; Linebackers – Mike Archer; Defensive backs – Willy Robinson; Defensive assistant – Lou Spanos; Special teams coaches: Special teams – Kevin Spencer; Strength and conditioning: Conditioning coach – Chet Fuhrman; Medical staff; Ophthalmologist – Dr. Randy Beatty; Physician, orthopedic – Dr. James P. Bradley; Neurological surgeon – Dr. Joseph Maroon; Physician, M.D. – Dr. Richard Rydze; Physician, consultant – Dr. Abraham J. Twerski; Physician, M.D. – Dr. Anthony P. Yates; Training staff; Head athletic trainer – John Norwig; Assistant athletic trainer – Ryan Grove; Assistant athletic trainer – Ariko Iso; Football staff; Player development coordinator – Anthony Griggs; Equipment manager – Rodgers Freyvogel; Field manager – Rich Baker; Field/equipment assistant – Paul Gallagher; Video coordinator – Bob McCartney; Video assistant – Andy Lizanich; Video assistant – Rob Brakel; Photographers – Mike Fabus

=== Roster ===
2002 Pittsburgh Steelers roster
Quarterbacks (QB): 16 Charlie Batch; 8 Tommy Maddox; 10 Kordell Stewart; Running backs (RB): 36 Jerome Bettis; 45 Chris Fuamatu-Maʻafala; 35 Dan Kreider FB; 21 Amos Zereoué; Wide receivers (WR): 80 Plaxico Burress; 88 Terance Mathis; 89 Lee Mays; 82 Antwaan Randle El; 86 Hines Ward; Tight ends (TE): 85 John Allred; 81 Marco Battaglia; 48 Matt Cushing; 84 Jerame Tuman	Offensive linemen (OL): 66 Alan Faneca G; 72 Wayne Gandy T; 64 Jeff Hartings C; 78 Mathias Nkwenti T; 56 Chukky Okobi C; 79 Oliver Ross G/T; 73 Kendall Simmons G; 77 Marvel Smith T; 68 Keydrick Vincent G; Defensive linemen (DL): 94 Rodney Bailey DE; 96 Kendrick Clancy NT; 98 Casey Hampton NT; 76 Chris Hoke NT; 99 Brett Keisel DE; 91 Aaron Smith DE; 67 Kimo von Oelhoffen DE	Linebackers (LB): 97 Kendrell Bell ILB; 51 James Farrior ILB; 50 Larry Foote ILB; 92 Jason Gildon OLB; 53 Clark Haggans ILB; 93 James Harrison OLB; 95 Mike Jones ILB; 90 Justin Kurpeikis OLB; 55 Joey Porter OLB; Defensive backs (DB): 27 Brent Alexander FS; 41 Lethon Flowers SS; 28 Chris Hope FS; 29 Chidi Iwuoma CB; 31 Mike Logan SS; 22 Hank Poteat CB; 30 Chad Scott CB; 26 Deshea Townsend CB; 20 Dewayne Washington CB; Special teams (ST): 3 Jeff Reed K; 14 Tom Rouen P; 54 Mike Schneck LS	Practice squad: 60 Josh Burr T; 15 Khori Ivy WR; 83 Darcey Levy WR; 37 Antwon McCray RB; 39 Erik Totten S; Reserve: 87 Mark Bruener TE (IR); 57 John Fiala LB (IR); 34 Verron Haynes RB (IR); 4 Josh Miller P (IR); 2 Todd Peterson K (IR); Rookies in italics 53 active, 5 reserve, 5 practice squad

== Preseason ==
=== Schedule ===
Week	Date	Opponent	Result	Record	Venue	Attendance	Recap
1	August 8	New York Jets	L 6-16	0–1	Heinz Field	57,251	Recap
2	August 18	at Washington Redskins	L 34-35	0–2	FedExField	70,310	Recap
3	August 24	at Detroit Lions	W 34–22	1–2	Ford Field	59,262	Recap
4	August 29	Minnesota Vikings	W 17–14	2–2	Heinz Field	57,062	Recap

== Regular season ==
=== Schedule ===
Week	Date	Opponent	Result	Record	Venue	Attendance	Recap
1	September 9	at New England Patriots	**L** 14–30	0–1	Gillette Stadium	68,436	Summary
2	September 15	Oakland Raiders	**L** 17–30	0–2	Heinz Field	62,260	Summary
3	Bye week						
4	September 29	**Cleveland Browns**	**W** 16–13 (OT)	1–2	Heinz Field	62,864	Summary
5	October 6	at New Orleans Saints	**L** 29–32	1–3	Louisiana Superdome	67,734	Summary
6	October 13	at **Cincinnati Bengals**	**W** 34–7	2–3	Paul Brown Stadium	63,900	Summary
7	October 21	Indianapolis Colts	**W** 28–10	3–3	Heinz Field	62,800	Summary
8	October 27	at **Baltimore Ravens**	**W** 31–18	4–3	PSINet Stadium	69,638	Summary
9	November 3	at **Cleveland Browns**	**W** 23–20	5–3	Cleveland Browns Stadium	73,718	Summary
10	November 10	Atlanta Falcons	**T** 34–34 (OT)	5–3–1	Heinz Field	62,779	Summary
11	November 17	at Tennessee Titans	**L** 23–31	5–4–1	Adelphia Coliseum	68,804	Summary
12	November 24	**Cincinnati Bengals**	**W** 29–21	6–4–1	Heinz Field	60,473	Summary
13	December 1	at Jacksonville Jaguars	**W** 25–23	7–4–1	Alltel Stadium	55,260	Summary
14	December 8	Houston Texans	**L** 6–24	7–5–1	Heinz Field	58,551	Summary
15	December 15	Carolina Panthers	**W** 30–14	8–5–1	Heinz Field	58,586	Summary
16	December 23	at Tampa Bay Buccaneers	**W** 17–7	9–5–1	Raymond James Stadium	65,684	Summary
17	December 29	**Baltimore Ravens**	**W** 34–31	10–5–1	Heinz Field	61,961	Summary

Note: Intra-divisional opponents are in bold text.

=== Game summaries ===
==== Week 1: at New England Patriots ====
Week 1: Pittsburgh Steelers (0–0) at New England Patriots (0–0) – Game summary

Quarter	1	2	3	4	Total
Steelers	7	0	0	7	**14**
**Patriots**	7	3	17	3	**30**

at Gillette Stadium, Foxborough, Massachusetts

- Date: September 9, 2002
- Game time: 9:00 p.m.
- Game weather: Overcast, 86 °F (30 °C)
- Game attendance: 68,436
- Referee: Tony Corrente (99)
- TV announcers (ABC): Al Michaels, John Madden and Melissa Stark
- Recap, Game Book

Game information

**First quarter**

- NE – Christian Fauria 4-yard pass from Tom Brady (Adam Vinatieri kick), 10:57. Patriots 7–0. **Drive: 4 plays, 26 yards, 1:54.**
- PIT – Hines Ward 13-yard pass from Kordell Stewart (Todd Peterson kick), 4:50. Tied 7–7. **Drive: 10 plays, 74 yards, 6:07.**

**Second quarter**

- NE – Adam Vinatieri 45-yard field goal, 2:23. Patriots 10–7. **Drive: 9 plays, 44 yards, 3:11.**

**Third quarter**

- NE – Donald Hayes 40-yard pass from Tom Brady (Adam Vinatieri kick), 13:27. Patriots 17–7. **Drive: 4 plays, 74 yards, 1:33.**
- NE – Deion Branch 22-yard pass from Tom Brady (Adam Vinatieri kick), 7:03. Patriots 24–7. **Drive: 9 plays, 49 yards, 6:04.**
- NE – Adam Vinatieri 28-yard field goal, 2:08. Patriots 27–7. **Drive: 8 plays, 39 yards, 2:50.**

**Fourth quarter**

- NE – Adam Vinatieri 27-yard field goal, 9:32. Patriots 30–7. **Drive: 6 plays, 22 yards, 2:59.**
- PIT – Kordell Stewart 1-yard run (Todd Peterson kick), 0:00. Patriots 30–14. **Drive: 11 plays, 66 yards, 2:55.**

**Top passers**

- PIT – Kordell Stewart – 24/37, 242 yards, TD, 3 INT
- NE – Tom Brady – 29/43, 294 yards, 3 TD

**Top rushers**

- PIT – Jerome Bettis – 8 rushes, 35 yards
- NE – Antowain Smith – 17 rushes, 60 yards

**Top receivers**

- PIT – Hines Ward – 8 receptions, 90 yards, TD
- NE – Deion Branch – 6 receptions, 83 yards, TD

==== Week 2: vs. Oakland Raiders ====
	1	2	3	4	Total
**Raiders**	10	7	3	10	**30**
Steelers	7	3	7	0	**17**

at Heinz Field, Pittsburgh, Pennsylvania

- Game time: 8:30 pm EDT
- Game weather: 70 °F (21 °C) (Cloudy)
- Game attendance: 62,260
- Referee: Bill Leavy
- TV announcers: (ESPN) Mike Patrick (play by play), Paul Maguire (color commentator), Joe Theismann (color commentator), Suzy Kolber (sideline reporter)

With the loss, the Steelers went 0-2 heading into their bye week.

==== Week 4: vs. Cleveland Browns ====
	1	2	3	4	OT	Total
Browns	3	3	0	7	0	**13**
**Steelers**	0	6	0	7	3	**16**

at Heinz Field, Pittsburgh, Pennsylvania

- Game time: 1:00 pm EDT
- Game weather: 70 °F (21 °C) (Sunny)
- Game attendance: 62,864
- Referee: Bernie Kukar
- TV announcers: (CBS) Gus Johnson (play by play), Brent Jones (color commentator)

Kordell Stewart began the game, going 15–25 for 143 yards, but was intercepted by Robert Griffith of the Browns. At this point his Pittsburgh career all but ended when he was benched and replaced by backup Tommy Maddox, who had resurrected his career with stints with the New Jersey Red Dogs in the Arena Football League and a championship season in the ill-fated XFL. With the Steelers down 13–6, Maddox found Plaxico Burress for the tying touchdown just before the two-minute warning. The game went to overtime, but Maddox was picked off on his first throw of the extra quarter. The Browns, however, gagged when Phil Dawson missed a 45-yard field goal try. With new life the Steelers led by Maddox marched in range for Todd Peterson's 31-yarder and the 16–13 final.

==== Week 5: at New Orleans Saints ====
	1	2	3	4	Total
Steelers	0	14	7	8	**29**
**Saints**	10	9	10	3	**32**

at Louisiana Superdome, New Orleans, Louisiana

- Game time: 1:00 pm EDT
- Game weather: Dome
- Game attendance: 67,734
- Referee: Larry Nemmers
- TV announcers: (CBS) Gus Johnson (play by play), Brent Jones (color commentator)

Tommy Maddox made his first start replacing an ineffective Kordell Stewart. Jerome Bettis went over 11,000 rushing yards in his career.

==== Week 6: at Cincinnati Bengals ====
	1	2	3	4	Total
**Steelers**	7	17	7	3	**34**
Bengals	0	0	7	0	**7**

at Paul Brown Stadium, Cincinnati, Ohio

- Game time: 1:00 pm EDT
- Game weather: 54 °F (12 °C) (Sunny)
- Game attendance: 63,900
- Referee: Ron Winter
- TV announcers: (CBS) Kevin Harlan (play by play), Randy Cross (color commentator), and Beasley Reece (Sideline Reporter)

==== Week 7: vs. Indianapolis Colts ====
	1	2	3	4	Total
Colts	0	3	7	0	**10**
**Steelers**	14	7	7	0	**28**

at Heinz Field, Pittsburgh, Pennsylvania

- Game time: 9:00 pm EDT
- Game weather: 46 °F (8 °C) (Partly Cloudy)
- Game attendance: 62,800
- Referee: Walt Coleman
- TV announcers: (ABC) Al Michaels (play by play), John Madden (color commentator), Melissa Stark (sideline reporter)

==== Week 8: at Baltimore Ravens ====
	1	2	3	4	Total
**Steelers**	14	14	3	0	**31**
Ravens	0	3	8	7	**18**

at Ravens Stadium, Baltimore, Maryland

- Game time: 1:00 pm EST
- Game weather: 61 °F (16 °C) (Sunny)
- Game attendance: 69,638
- Referee: Johnny Grier
- TV announcers: (CBS) Gus Johnson (play by play), Brent Jones (color commentator)

==== Week 9: at Cleveland Browns ====
	1	2	3	4	Total
**Steelers**	3	14	0	6	**23**
Browns	7	7	0	6	**20**

at Cleveland Browns Stadium, Cleveland, Ohio

- Game time: 1:00 pm EST
- Game weather: 40 °F (4 °C) (Sunny)
- Game attendance: 73,718
- Referee: Mike Carey
- TV announcers: (CBS) Ian Eagle (play by play), Solomon Wilcots (color commentator), Marcus Allen (sideline reporter)

==== Week 10: vs. Atlanta Falcons ====
	1	2	3	4	OT	Total
Falcons	0	7	10	17	0	**34**
Steelers	3	14	14	3	0	**34**

at Heinz Field, Pittsburgh, Pennsylvania

- Game time: 1:00 pm EST
- Game weather: 66 °F (19 °C) (Cloudy)
- Game attendance: 62,779
- Referee: Terry McAulay
- TV announcers: (FOX) Sam Rosen (play by play), Bill Maas (color commentator), Alby Oxenreiter (sideline reporter)

In the first NFL tie since 1997, Tommy Maddox erupted with 473 passing yards (a club record that stood until Ben Roethlisberger broke it in 2009) and connected on four touchdown throws in his first matchup against the coach who drafted him in Denver, Dan Reeves. Reeves' Falcons, however, were surging behind the running of sophomore quarterback Michael Vick. A 34–17 Steelers lead in the fourth could not be held as Warrick Dunn and Vick rushed the Falcons in range for a one-yard Bob Christian rushing touchdown, a Jay Feely field goal, and finally the tying Vick rushing score with 32 seconds remaining in regulation. In overtime the Steelers drove to range of a 48-yard field goal try by Todd Peterson, this after he'd missed a 40-yarder in regulation. The Falcons' Brian Finneran had caught six passes for 72 yards, but in his career debut on special teams he pulled off the play of the game by blocking the kick. Late in the extra quarter Maddox was picked off by Kevin Mathis, but the subsequent 56-yad Feely try was blocked, with one second left on the clock. Maddox launched a desperation heave and Burress caught it, but was ruled down at the one-foot line with the game declared over. This would be the last time the Steelers would tie until Week 1 of the 2018 season.

==== Week 11: at Tennessee Titans ====
	1	2	3	4	Total
Steelers	7	0	0	16	**23**
**Titans**	7	7	14	3	**31**

at Adelphia Coliseum, Nashville, Tennessee

- Game time: 1:00 pm EST
- Game weather: 42 °F (6 °C) (Partly Cloudy)
- Game attendance: 68,804
- Referee: Tony Corrente
- TV announcers: (CBS) Gus Johnson (play by play), Brent Jones (color commentator), Marcus Allen (sideline reporter)

Maddox's career nearly ended in tragedy as he threw a pass that Hines Ward turned into a 72-yard touchdown, but after completing just 14 of 28 throws for 194 yards and three picks he was sacked; the hit left him briefly paralyzed and he was taken to the hospital on a stretcher. He recovered from the hit but Kordell Stewart had to come off the bench for what turned out to be his final three games with the Steelers. He completed 13 of 17 throws for two touchdowns and the Steelers also completed two two-point tries. It wasn't enough as the Titans behind 257 passing yards (with two touchdowns) by Steve McNair and 121 rushing yards (McNair and Eddie George accounted for 103 of them) won 31–23.

==== Week 12: vs. Cincinnati Bengals ====
	1	2	3	4	Total
Bengals	0	14	0	7	**21**
**Steelers**	14	3	3	9	**29**

at Heinz Field, Pittsburgh, Pennsylvania

- Game time: 1:00 pm EST
- Game weather: 45 °F (7 °C) (Partly Cloudy)
- Game attendance: 60,473
- Referee: Ed Hochuli
- TV announcers: (CBS) Craig Bolerjack (play by play), Craig James (color commentator)

==== Week 13: at Jacksonville Jaguars ====
	1	2	3	4	Total
**Steelers**	6	10	3	6	**25**
Jaguars	7	3	0	13	**23**

at Alltel Stadium, Jacksonville, Florida

- Game time: 1:00 pm EST
- Game weather: 53 °F (12 °C) (Sunny)
- Game attendance: 55,260
- Referee: Gerald Austin
- TV announcers: (CBS) Gus Johnson and Brent Jones

Kordell Stewart made his last start as a Steelers quarterback, running for a touchdown. Jeff Reed kicked six field goals. Maddox regained his starting position the following week despite Stewart performing well.

==== Week 14: vs. Houston Texans ====
	1	2	3	4	Total
**Texans**	14	0	0	10	**24**
Steelers	0	3	3	0	**6**

at Heinz Field, Pittsburgh, Pennsylvania

- Game time: 1:00 pm EST
- Game weather: 35 °F (2 °C) (Cloudy)
- Game attendance: 58,551
- Referee: Bob McElwee
- TV announcers: (CBS) Ian Eagle (play by play), Solomon Wilcots (color commentator)

The Steelers were stunned at home against the expansion Houston Texans, failing to find any offensive footing at all. With the embarrassing loss, the Steelers fell to 7-5-1. This would be the Steelers only home loss to the Texans until 2025.

==== Week 15: vs. Carolina Panthers ====
	1	2	3	4	Total
Panthers	7	0	0	7	**14**
**Steelers**	7	6	7	10	**30**

at Heinz Field, Pittsburgh, Pennsylvania

- Game time: 1:00 pm EST
- Game weather: 40 °F (4 °C) (Cloudy)
- Game attendance: 58,586
- Referee: Dick Hantak
- TV announcers: (FOX) Sam Rosen (play by play), Bill Maas (color commentator)

==== Week 16: at Tampa Bay Buccaneers ====
	1	2	3	4	Total
**Steelers**	17	0	0	0	**17**
Buccaneers	0	0	0	7	**7**

at Raymond James Stadium, Tampa, Florida

- Game time: 9:00 pm EST
- Game weather:
- Game attendance: 65,864
- Referee: Larry Nemmers
- TV announcers: (ABC) Al Michaels (play by play), John Madden (color commentator), Melissa Stark (sideline reporter)

==== Week 17: vs. Baltimore Ravens ====
	1	2	3	4	Total
Ravens	7	7	10	7	**31**
**Steelers**	7	13	0	14	**34**

at Heinz Field, Pittsburgh, Pennsylvania

- Game time: 1:00 pm EST
- Game weather: 32 °F (0 °C) (Cloudy)
- Game attendance: 61,961
- Referee: Ron Winter
- TV announcers: (CBS) Kevin Harlan (play by play), Randy Cross (color commentator), and Beasley Reece (sideline reporter)

=== Standings ===
==== Division ====
AFC North
	W	L	T	PCT	DIV	CONF	PF	PA	STK
^{(3)} Pittsburgh Steelers	10	5	1	.656	6–0	8–4	390	345	W3
^{(6)} Cleveland Browns	9	7	0	.563	3–3	7–5	344	320	W2
Baltimore Ravens	7	9	0	.438	3–3	7–5	316	354	L2
Cincinnati Bengals	2	14	0	.125	0–6	1–11	279	456	L1

==== Conference ====
AFC
#	Team	Division	W	L	T	PCT	DIV	CONF	SOS	SOV
**Division leaders**
1 (Note: Oakland finished ahead of Tennessee based on head-to-head victory.)	Oakland Raiders	West	11	5	0	.688	4–2	9–3	.529	.531
2	Tennessee Titans	South	11	5	0	.688	6–0	9–3	.479	.474
3	Pittsburgh Steelers	North	10	5	1	.656	6–0	8–4	.486	.451
4 (Note: N.Y. Jets finished ahead of New England based on win percentage in common games (8–4 to 7–5) after both finished ahead of Miami based on division record (4–2 to 2–4).)	New York Jets	East	9	7	0	.563	4–2	6–6	.500	.500
**Wild Cards**
5	Indianapolis Colts	South	10	6	0	.625	4–2	8–4	.479	.400
6 (Note: Cleveland finished ahead of Denver and New England based on conference record (7–5 vs 5–7/6–6))	Cleveland Browns	North	9	7	0	.563	3–3	7–5	.486	.413
**Did not qualify for the postseason**
7 (Note: Denver finished ahead of New England based on head-to-head victory.)	Denver Broncos	West	9	7	0	.563	3–3	5–7	.527	.486
8 (Note: New England finished ahead of Miami based on division record (4–2 to 2–4).)	New England Patriots	East	9	7	0	.563	4–2	6–6	.525	.455
9	Miami Dolphins	East	9	7	0	.563	2–4	7–5	.508	.486
10 (Note: Buffalo finished ahead of San Diego based on head-to-head victory.)	Buffalo Bills	East	8	8	0	.500	2–4	5–7	.473	.352
11 (Note: San Diego finished ahead of Kansas City based on division record (3–3 to 2–4).)	San Diego Chargers	West	8	8	0	.500	3–3	6–6	.492	.453
12	Kansas City Chiefs	West	8	8	0	.500	2–4	6–6	.527	.516
13	Baltimore Ravens	North	7	9	0	.438	3–3	7–5	.506	.384
14	Jacksonville Jaguars	South	6	10	0	.375	1–5	4–8	.506	.438
15	Houston Texans	South	4	12	0	.250	1–5	2–10	.518	.492
16	Cincinnati Bengals	North	2	14	0	.125	0–6	1–11	.537	.406
**Tiebreakers** (Note: When breaking ties for three or more teams under the NFL's rules, they are first broken within divisions, then comparing only the highest ranked remaining team from each division.)

== Playoffs ==
=== Schedule ===
Week	Date	Opponent	Result	Record	Venue	Attendance	Recap
Wild Card	January 5	Cleveland Browns	W 36–33	1–0	Heinz Field	62,595	Summary
Divisional	January 11	at Tennessee Titans	L 31–34 (OT)	1–1	Adelphia Coliseum	68,809	Summary

=== Game summaries ===
==== AFC Wild Card Playoff: vs. Cleveland Browns ====
	1	2	3	4	Total
Browns	7	10	7	9	33
Steelers	0	7	7	22	36

at Heinz Field, Pittsburgh, Pennsylvania

- Game time: 1:00 pm EST
- Game weather: 27 °F (−3 °C) (Light Snow)
- Game attendance: 62,595
- Referee: Bill Carollo
- TV announcers: (CBS) Greg Gumbel, Phil Simms and Armen Keteyian

==== AFC Divisional Playoff: at Tennessee Titans ====
	1	2	3	4	OT	Total
Steelers	0	13	7	11	0	31
Titans	14	0	14	3	3	34

at Adelphia Coliseum, Nashville, Tennessee

- Game time: 4:30 p.m. EST
- Game weather: 34 °F (1 °C) (Sunny)
- Game attendance: 68,809
- Referee: Ron Blum
- TV announcers: (CBS) Dick Enberg, Dan Dierdorf and Bonnie Bernstein

== Honors and awards ==
=== Pro Bowl representatives ===
See: 2003 Pro Bowl

- No. 55 Joey Porter-Outside Linebacker
- No. 66 Alan Faneca-Offensive Guard
- No. 86 Hines Ward-Wide Receiver
- No. 92 Jason Gildon-Outside Linebacker
