= List of Akron Zips in the NFL draft =

This is a list of Akron Zips football players in the NFL draft.

== Key ==
B	Back	K	Kicker	NT	Nose tackle
C	Center	LB	Linebacker	FB	Fullback
DB	Defensive back	P	Punter	HB	Halfback
DE	Defensive end	QB	Quarterback	WR	Wide receiver
DT	Defensive tackle	RB	Running back	G	Guard
E	End	T	Offensive tackle	TE	Tight end

== Selections ==
Year	Round	Pick	Player	Team	Position
1941	22	203	Mike Fernella	Philadelphia Eagles	T
1967	13	338	Al Kerkian	Dallas Cowboys	DE
1967	16	411	Don Williams	Cleveland Browns	WR
1968	12	307	Paul Paxton	Miami Dolphins	T
1969	11	285	Ken Delaney	Baltimore Colts	T
1987	7	178	Chris Kelly	Pittsburgh Steelers	TE
1989	10	274	John Buddenberg	Cleveland Browns	T
1993	8	224	Daron Alcorn	Tampa Bay Buccaneers	K
1997	3	73	Jason Taylor	Miami Dolphins	DE
2001	3	84	Dwight Smith	Tampa Bay Buccaneers	DB
2002	5	151	Jake Schifino	Tennessee Titans	WR
2005	3	67	Charlie Frye	Cleveland Browns	QB
2006	4	130	Domenik Hixon	Denver Broncos	WR
2007	3	88	Andy Alleman	New Orleans Saints	G
2008	4	114	Reggie Corner	Buffalo Bills	DB
2016	5	175	Jatavis Brown	San Diego Chargers	LB
2019	6	207	Ulysees Gilbert	Pittsburgh Steelers	LB
