= Brian Leigeb =

American football player (born 1978)

No. 40
- Position: Defensive back

Personal information
- Born: October 2, 1978 (age 48); Midland, Michigan, U.S.
- Listed height: 6 ft 2 in (1.88 m)
- Listed weight: 207 lb (94 kg)

Career information
- High school: Herbert Henry Dow (Midland)
- College: Central Michigan
- NFL draft: 2001: undrafted

Career history
- Grand Rapids Rampage (2001); Buffalo Bills (2001)*; Indianapolis Colts (2001–2002); Cincinnati Bengals (2003)*
- * Offseason or practice squad member only

Awards and highlights
- ArenaBowl champion (2001); Second-team All-MAC (2000)

Career NFL statistics
- Total tackles: 11
- Tackles for loss: 2
- Games played: 15
- Games started: 0
- Stats at Pro Football Reference

Brian Leigeb (born October 2, 1978) is an American former professional football player who was a defensive back for the Indianapolis Colts of the National Football League (NFL) in 2002. He played college football for the Central Michigan Chippewas. He is currently a college football assistant coach.

== Early life and college ==
Leigeb was born on October 2, 1978, in Midland, Michigan. He played high school football at Herbert Henry Dow and college football for the Central Michigan Chippewas.

== Professional career ==
In the 2002 NFL season, Leigeb played for the Indianapolis Colts. He appeared in 15 games, recording 11 total tackles, including two tackles for loss.

== Coaching career ==
Since 2011, Leigeb has served as the defensive backs coach for the football team at Northwood Timberwolves.
