= Josh Mallard =

American football player (born 1980)

No. 61, 68, 94, 96, 98
- Position: Defensive end

Personal information
- Born: March 21, 1980 (age 46); Savannah, Georgia, U.S.
- Listed height: 6 ft 2 in (1.88 m)
- Listed weight: 275 lb (125 kg)

Career information
- High school: Benedictine (Savannah)
- College: Georgia
- NFL draft: 2002: 7th round, 220th overall pick

Career history
- Indianapolis Colts (2002–2003); Cleveland Browns (2003); Miami Dolphins (2004)*; Indianapolis Colts (2005)*; Atlanta Falcons (2006–2007); Denver Broncos (2007); Cincinnati Bengals (2008); Las Vegas Locomotives (2009); Arizona Rattlers (2013); Orlando Predators (2013)
- * Offseason or practice squad member only

Awards and highlights
- UFL champion (2009)

Career NFL statistics
- Total tackles: 52
- Sacks: 8.5
- Forced fumbles: 2
- Fumble recoveries: 4
- Stats at Pro Football Reference

Career AFL statistics
- Total tackles: 1
- Stats at ArenaFan.com

Josh Mallard (born March 21, 1980) is an American former professional football player who was a defensive end in the National Football League (NFL). He was selected by the Indianapolis Colts in the seventh round of the 2002 NFL draft. He played college football for the Georgia Bulldogs.

Mallard has also played for the Atlanta Falcons, Denver Broncos, Cincinnati Bengals and Las Vegas Locomotives.

== Early life ==
Mallard played football at Benedictine Military School in Savannah, Ga., where he was a 1996 SuperPrep All-America selection and was named to the Atlanta Journal-Constitution Super Southern 100, Top 50 in Georgia and First-team AAAA All-State honors. Named Savannah Player of the Year by The Savannah News Press. He led his team to the state quarterfinals with 168 tackles and 36 sacks as a senior.

== College career ==
Mallard played in 43 games (7 starts), totaling 74 tackles (50 solo), 18 sacks, five forced fumbles and three passes defensed. He finished his career fifth on the Bulldogs' all-time sacks list. As a senior, Mallard played in 11 games (1 start) posted 20 tackles (12 solo), including five sacks, despite being limited by a knee injury. As a junior, Mallard was credited with 28 tackles (20 solo), including three sacks, a forced fumble and two passes defensed in 11 games (6 starts). Against Auburn, Mallard had 10 tackles and two quarterback pressures. As a sophomore reserve lineman, Mallard played in 11 games (0 starts) and notched 12 tackles (8 solo), two forced fumbles and four sacks. He played in 10 games as a redshirt freshman and made 14 tackles (10 solo), including six sacks, and two forced fumbles.

== Professional career ==
=== Indianapolis Colts ===
Mallard was selected by Indianapolis in the seventh round (220th overall) of the 2002 NFL draft. Mallard played in 13 games (0 starts) for the Colts. He registered 20 tackles (15 solo), including a sack, and three fumble recoveries. In 2003 Mallard spent training camp with Indianapolis, but was waived on August 31, 2003.

=== Cleveland Browns ===
He was out of football until the Cleveland Browns signed him on December 10, 2003. He was out of football after the Browns waived him on December 12.

=== Miami Dolphins ===
In 2004 Mallard spent the entire season out of football after competing in training camp with the Miami Dolphins. He was waived by the Dolphins on August 30, 2004.

=== Amsterdam Admirals ===
In 2005 Mallard spent the season out of football after competing in NFL Europe with the Amsterdam Admirals where he registered 12 tackles, two sacks, two blocked punts and two passes defensed.

=== Atlanta Falcons ===
Signed by Atlanta (future contract) on January 4, 2006. In 2006 Mallard recorded eight tackles (7 solo), including four sacks, four forced fumbles, one fumble recovery and defensed two passes in 14 games (1 start) for Atlanta. Mallard was waived by the Atlanta Falcons on October 13, 2007.

=== Denver Broncos ===
Mallard joined the Broncos as a free agent on November 6, 2007, after playing in three games with Atlanta (did not record any statistics). With Denver he played 11 games for the year, including his eight contests with Denver, and registered 20 tackles (15 solo), 3.5 sacks, one pass breakup and one forced fumble. They later released him on August 25, 2008.

=== Cincinnati Bengals ===
Mallard was signed by the Cincinnati Bengals on November 24, 2008, after defensive ends Robert Geathers and Frostee Rucker were placed on injured reserve. The Bengals released Mallard on December 9, 2008.

=== Arizona Rattlers ===
Mallard was assigned to the Arizona Rattlers of the Arena Football League for the 2013 season.

=== Orlando Predators ===
On May 2, 2013, Mallard was traded to the Orlando Predators for future considerations. Mallard was reassigned on July 10, 2013.

=== NFL statistics ===
Year	Team	Games	Combined tackles	Tackles	Assisted tackles	Sacks	Forced fumbles	Fumble recoveries	Fumble return yards	Interceptions	Interception return yards	Yards per interception return	Longest interception return	Interceptions returned for touchdown	Passes defended
2002	IND	13	12	11	1	1.0	0	3	0	0	0	0	0	0	2
2006	ATL	14	12	12	0	4.0	2	1	0	0	0	0	0	0	2
2007	DEN	8	15	12	3	3.5	1	0	0	0	0	0	0	0	1
2008	CIN	2	1	1	0	0.0	0	0	0	0	0	0	0	0	0
Career		37	40	36	4	8.5	3	4	0	0	0	0	0	0	5
