= Larry Tripplett =

American football player (born 1979)

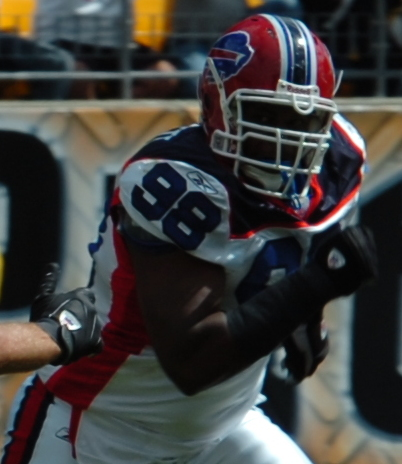
- Tripplett with the Buffalo Bills in 2007

No. 75, 98
- Position: Defensive tackle

Personal information
- Born: January 18, 1979 (age 47); Los Angeles, California, U.S.
- Listed height: 6 ft 2 in (1.88 m)
- Listed weight: 295 lb (134 kg)

Career information
- High school: Westchester (Los Angeles)
- College: Washington
- NFL draft: 2002: 2nd round, 42nd overall pick

Career history
- Indianapolis Colts (2002–2005); Buffalo Bills (2006–2007); Seattle Seahawks (2008)*
- * Offseason or practice squad member only

Awards and highlights
- First-team All-American (2001); Second-team All-American (2000); 2× First-team All-Pac-10 (2000–2001); Second-team All-Pac-10 (1999)

Career NFL statistics
- Total tackles: 214
- Sacks: 8.5
- Forced fumbles: 5
- Fumble recoveries: 4
- Interceptions: 1
- Defensive touchdowns: 1
- Stats at Pro Football Reference

Larry Christopher Jermaine Tripplett (born January 18, 1979) is an American former professional football player who was a defensive tackle in the National Football League (NFL). He played college football for the Washington Huskies and was selected by the Indianapolis Colts in the second round of the 2002 NFL draft. Tripplett also played for the Buffalo Bills.

== Early life ==
Tripplett attended Westchester High School in Los Angeles, California. He recorded 13 sacks, two blocked punts and one blocked field goal his senior year in 1996, earning Coastal Conference Most Valuable Player honors. He also played fullback in high school.

== College career ==
Tripplett played college football for the Washington Huskies from 1997 to 2001. He was redshirted in 1997. He played in four regular season games in 1998, making four tackles on the year. The next season in 1999, Tripplett started all 11 regular season games, accumulating 35 tackles, one sack and four pass breakups while garnering second-team All-Pac-10 recognition. He started all 11 regular season games for the Huskies in 2000, recording 38 tackles, 6.5 sacks, one forced fumble, one fumble recovery, three pass breakups, two blocked field goals and one blocked extra point, earning Associated Press third-team All-American, The Sporting News second-team All-American, espnmag.com first-team All-American and first-team All-Pac-10 honors. Tripplett totaled 38 tackles, two sacks and one blocked field goal his senior season in 2001, garnering Associated Press second-team All-American, The Sporting News third-team All-American, The Football News first-team All-American and first-team All-Pac-10 accolades. He majored in geography at Washington.

== Professional career ==
Pre-draft measurables
Height	Weight	Arm length	Hand span	40-yard dash	10-yard split	20-yard split	20-yard shuttle	Vertical jump	Broad jump
6 ft 1 3/4 in (1.87 m)	305 lb (138 kg)	33 in (0.84 m)	9 3/4 in (0.25 m)	4.93 s	1.70 s	2.83 s	4.36 s	30.0 in (0.76 m)	8 ft 6 in (2.59 m)
All values from NFL Combine

Tripplett was selected by the Indianapolis Colts in the second round of the 2002 NFL draft. He officially signed with the team on July 26, 2002. He played in 13 games, starting 10, during his rookie season in 2002, recording 24 solo tackles and seven assisted tackles. Tripplett started all 16 games for the Colts in 2003, totaling 31 solo tackles, 19 assisted tackles, one sack and one forced fumble. He appeared in all 16 games (no starts) during the 2004 season, accumulating 26 solo tackles, three assisted tackles and one forced fumble. He played in 15 games, starting four, for the Colts in 2005, recording 29 solo tackles, seven assisted tackles, a career-high four sacks, one forced fumble, two fumble recoveries (one of which was returned for a touchdown) and two pass breakups. Tripplett became a free agent after the 2005 season.

On March 13, 2006, Tripplett signed a five-year, $18 million deal ($5.5 million signing bonus) with the Buffalo Bills. He started all 16 games for the Bills in 2006, totaling 19 solo tackles, 14 assisted tackles, 2.5 sacks, one forced fumble, one fumble recovery and three pass breakups. He started all 16 games for the second straight season in 2007, accumulating 18 solo tackles, 17 assisted tackles, one sack, one forced fumble, one fumble recovery and five pass breakups. Tripplett was released by the Bills on February 29, 2008.

On April 30, 2008, Tripplett was signed by the Seattle Seahawks for the veteran-minimum of $605,000. He was released on August 30, 2008.

== NFL career statistics ==
Legend
**Bold**	Career high

=== Regular season ===
Year	Team	Games		Tackles					Interceptions					Fumbles			
Year	Team	GP	GS	Cmb	Solo	Ast	Sck	TFL	Int	Yds	TD	Lng	PD	FF	FR	Yds	TD
2002	IND	13	10	31	24	7	0.0	0	0	0	0	0	0	0	0	0	0
2003	IND	**16**	**16**	**50**	**31**	**19**	1.0	2	0	0	0	0	0	**1**	0	0	0
2004	IND	**16**	0	29	26	3	0.0	4	0	0	0	0	0	**1**	0	0	0
2005	IND	15	4	36	29	7	**4.0**	**6**	0	0	0	0	2	**1**	**2**	**60**	**1**
2006	BUF	**16**	**16**	33	19	14	2.5	2	0	0	0	0	3	**1**	1	0	0
2007	BUF	**16**	**16**	35	18	17	1.0	3	**1**	0	0	0	**5**	**1**	1	0	0
Total		92	62	214	147	67	8.5	17	1	0	0	0	10	5	4	60	1

=== Playoffs ===
Year	Team	Games		Tackles					Interceptions					Fumbles			
Year	Team	GP	GS	Cmb	Solo	Ast	Sck	TFL	Int	Yds	TD	Lng	PD	FF	FR	Yds	TD
2002	IND	1	1	2	1	**1**	0.0	0	0	0	0	0	0	0	0	0	0
2003	IND	**3**	**3**	4	4	0	0.0	0	0	0	0	0	0	0	0	0	0
2004	IND	2	0	**5**	**5**	0	**2.0**	**1**	0	0	0	0	0	0	0	0	0
2005	IND	1	0	1	1	0	1.0	**1**	0	0	0	0	0	0	0	0	0
Total		7	4	12	11	1	3.0	2	0	0	0	0	0	0	0	0	0
