= Clifton Crosby =

American football player (born 1974)

No. 26, 31
- Position: Defensive back

Personal information
- Born: September 17, 1974 (age 52); Erie, Pennsylvania, U.S.
- Listed height: 5 ft 10 in (1.78 m)
- Listed weight: 179 lb (81 kg)

Career information
- High school: Erie (PA) East
- College: Maryland
- NFL draft: 1999: undrafted

Career history
- St. Louis Rams (1999)*; Cincinnati Bengals (1999)*; St. Louis Rams (1999–2000); Indianapolis Colts (2000–2003); Kansas City Chiefs (2004)*
- * Offseason or practice squad member only

Awards and highlights
- Super Bowl champion (XXXIV)

Career NFL statistics
- Games played: 45
- Tackles: 22
- Fumble recoveries: 5
- Stats at Pro Football Reference

Clifton Marcel Crosby (born September 17, 1974) is an American former professional football player who played defensive back for the St. Louis Rams and Indianapolis Colts in the National Football League (NFL). He earned a Super Bowl ring in 2000 as a rookie with the Rams. After retiring from the NFL, he refocused his energy to become a motivational speaker and youth advocate.
