= Darrell Hill (American football) =

American football player (born 1979)

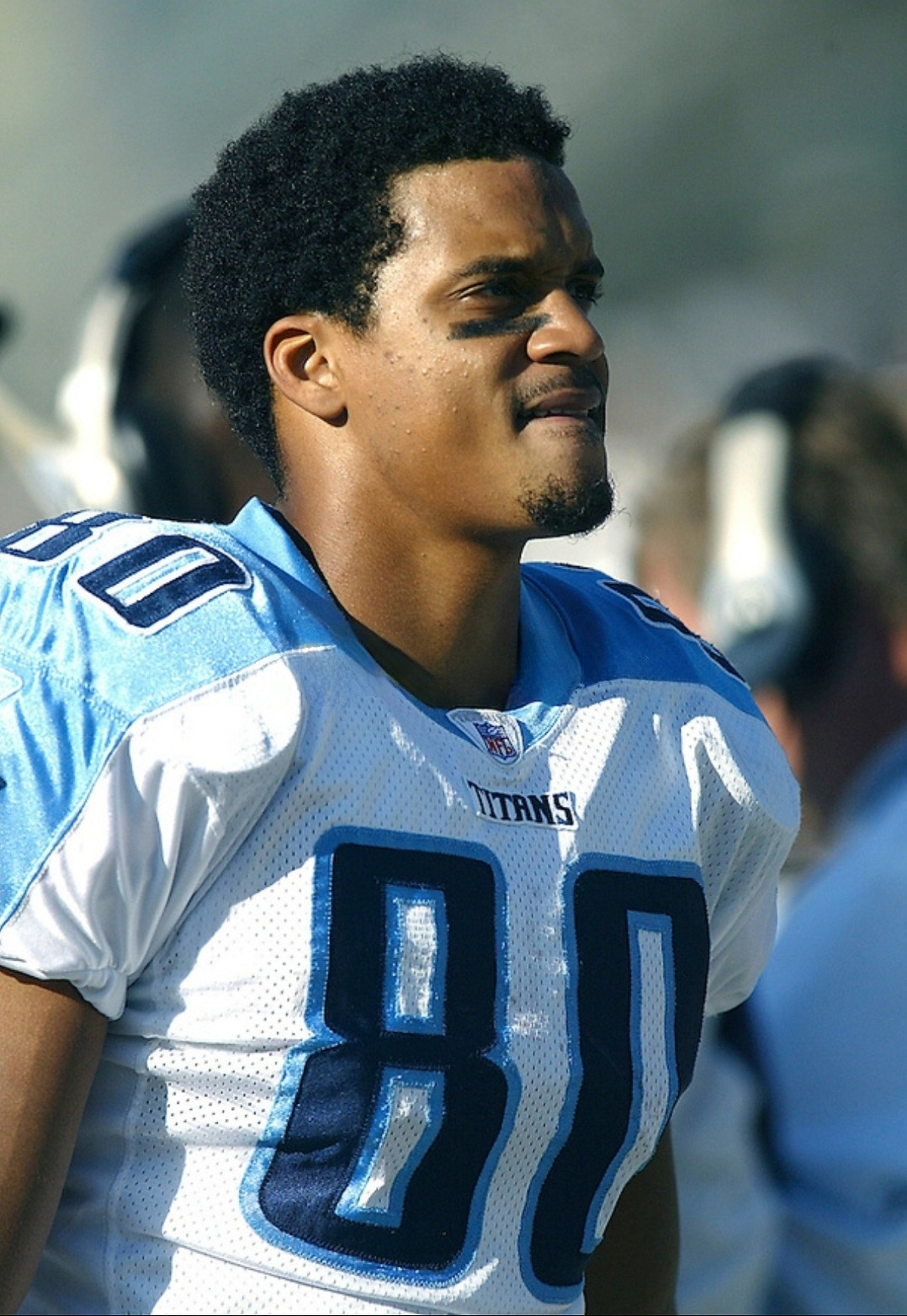
- Hill with the Tennessee Titans in 2004

No. 80
- Position: Wide receiver / Special teamer

Personal information
- Born: June 19, 1979 (age 47); Chicago, Illinois, U.S.
- Listed height: 6 ft 2 in (1.88 m)
- Listed weight: 200 lb (91 kg)

Career information
- High school: Mount Carmel (Chicago)
- College: Northern Illinois
- NFL draft: 2002: 7th round, 225th overall pick

Career history
- Tennessee Titans (2002–2005); Kansas City Chiefs (2005–2007)

Awards and highlights
- First-team All-Pro (2003); Pro Bowl (2003); Third-team All-American (2001); Second-team All-MAC (2001)

Career NFL statistics
- Total tackles: 101
- Forced fumbles: 5
- Fumble recoveries: 3
- Stats at Pro Football Reference

Darrell Frederick Hill (born June 19, 1979) is an American former professional football player who was a wide receiver in the National Football League (NFL) for the Tennessee Titans and the Kansas City Chiefs. He played college football for the Northern Illinois Huskies. He wore number 80. Hill possesses a 4.2 time in the 40-yard dash and a 45-inch vertical jump.

== Early life ==
Hill attended Mount Carmel High School in Chicago. Where he played football, basketball, and track and field. In 1996 Hill was an All-State, All-Area, and All Catholic League wide receiver. He helped lead Mount Carmel High School to the 1996 IHSA State Championship.

== College career ==
Hill attended Northern Illinois University. Known in his college and prep days as “The Thrill”, he was part of the 1997 NIU recruiting class, that has been credited for turning around their Huskies football program. This class also produced NFL players, Ryan Diem, Justin McCareins, Jermaine Hampton, and Frisman Jackson. Hill is considered to be one of the best WR to play at Northern Illinois University. Known for his big play ability Hill was voted All-MAC, All-American, and team MVP his senior season. Hill ranked fourth nationally in major-college football with a 21.6 yards-per-catch average in 2001.

== Professional career ==
Hill was selected in the seventh round (225th overall) of the 2002 NFL draft by the Tennessee Titans, where he played for three seasons. He signed as free agent with the Kansas City Chiefs on April 5, 2005. Hill was a standout Special Teams Player during his career. Often regarded as one of the fastest Players in the NFL, Hill dominated as a gunner on punt, and kickoff coverage. Former Detroit Lions defensive coordinator Gunther Cunningham has referred to Hill as the best gunner he has ever seen in the National Football League. Hill is one of the only players to ever demand a triple team from the opposing team on punt coverage. Hill suffered a serious spine injury, which ended his career.
