= Matt Martin (American football) =

American football player (born 1979)

No. 68
- Positions: Guard, tackle

Personal information
- Born: October 12, 1979 (age 47); Long Beach, California, U.S.
- Listed height: 6 ft 6 in (1.98 m)
- Listed weight: 272 lb (123 kg)

Career information
- High school: Edison (Huntington Beach, California)
- College: Long Beach CC (1997–1998); Huntington Beach, California (1999–2001)
- NFL draft: 2002: undrafted

Career history
- Tennessee Titans (2002–2004); Tampa Bay Buccaneers (2005)*
- * Offseason or practice squad member only

Awards and highlights
- All-Mission Conference (1998)

Career NFL statistics
- Games played: 2
- Stats at Pro Football Reference

Matthew Stuart Martin (born October 12, 1979) is an American former professional football guard and tackle who played in the National Football League (NFL) for the Tennessee Titans and Tampa Bay Buccaneers. He played college football for the Long Beach City Vikings and Kansas State Wildcats.

== Early life ==
Martin was born on October 12, 1979, in Long Beach, California. He attended Edison High School in Huntington Beach, California.

== College career ==
Martin played college football for the Long Beach City Vikings from 1997 to 1998 and Kansas State Wildcats from 1999 to 2001. He was an All-Mission Conference selection and earned honorable mention All-American honors as a sophomore. On February 1, 1999, Martin committed to Kansas State University. He redshirted his first season and lettered his last two. In October 2000, Martin was arrested after driving at a parking attendant attempting to impound his vehicle. As a senior, Martin started at left tackle and helped the Wildcats set a new school record with 257.7 rushing yards per game.

== Professional career ==
=== Tennessee Titans ===
After going undrafted in the 2002 NFL draft, Martin signed with the Tennessee Titans as an undrafted free agent. On September 1, 2002, he was waived and signed to the practice squad. On December 20, Martin was elevated to the active roster in a depth role. He was active for two games, including the Divisional game against the Pittsburgh Steelers.

Martin remained on the active roster for the 2003 season but was inactive for all games. On September 6, 2004, he was waived with an injury settlement. Martin was kicked in the shin and the wound became infected, which required him to go the hospital to have it drained.

=== Tampa Bay Buccaneers ===
On April 8, 2005, the Tampa Bay Buccaneers signed Martin. On June 27, he was released by the team.
