= Brian Allen (running back) =

American football player (born 1980)

No. 43, 34
- Position: Running back

Personal information
- Born: April 20, 1980 (age 46); Ontario, California, U.S.
- Listed height: 5 ft 9 in (1.75 m)
- Listed weight: 205 lb (93 kg)

Career information
- High school: Damien (La Verne, California)
- College: Stanford
- NFL draft: 2002: 6th round, 204th overall pick

Career history
- Indianapolis Colts (2002–2004); San Francisco 49ers (2005)*
- * Offseason or practice squad member only

Awards and highlights
- First-team All-Pac-10 (2001)

Career NFL statistics
- Kick return: 1
- Yards: 6
- Stats at Pro Football Reference

Brian Allen (born April 20, 1980) is an American former professional football player in the National Football League (NFL). Allen played for the Indianapolis Colts, appearing as a kick returner. He played college football at Stanford, where he was a running back.

== Early life ==
Brian Allen was born on April 20, 1980 in Ontario, California. He attended Damien High School in LaVerne, California, where he was on the football and track and field teams.

On the Damien football team, Allen was a wingback in the team's wishbone offense and played safety on defense. As a senior, he had 70 carries for 950 yards and six touchdowns and 87 tackles and two interceptions on defense.

== College career ==
Allen played football at Stanford from 1998 to 2001. In the 1998 season, Allen appeared in all 11 games as a true freshman, recording four starts. He finished the season with 76 carries for 154 rushing yards, five receptions for 19 yards, and eight kickoff returns for 136 yards. Stanford went 3-8 on the season.

In 1999, Allen again appeared in all Cardinal games, starting the final six games of the season. He led Stanford in rushing with 115 attempts for 604 yards and four touchdowns. The Cardinal won the Pac-10 Conference and faced Wisconsin in the 2000 Rose Bowl, losing 9-17. Stanford finished the season ranked #22 in the AP poll with an 8-4 record.

As a junior in the 2000 season, Allen split running back duties with Kerry Carter. He finished second on the team in rushing with 117 carries for 460 yards and added 10 receptions for 105 yards. Stanford finished the year with a 5-6 record.

In his senior season, Allen and the Cardinal rebounded. Allen led the team in rushing with 174 attempts for 899 yards and four touchdowns. Allen had four games with over 130 rushing yards, including a 133 yard and three touchdown performance against Washington State. Stanford finished the year ranked #16 in the AP poll with a 9-3 record. They lost to Georgia Tech in the 2001 Seattle Bowl.

== Professional career ==
Pre-draft measurables
Height	Weight	40-yard dash	10-yard split	20-yard split	20-yard shuttle	Three-cone drill	Vertical jump	Broad jump	Bench press
5 ft 8 5/8 in (1.74 m)	209 lb (95 kg)	4.46 s	1.54 s	2.59 s	4.08 s	6.90 s	33.0 in (0.84 m)	9 ft 4 in (2.84 m)	19 reps
All values from NFL Combine

=== Indianapolis Colts ===
Allen was selected by the Indianapolis Colts in the sixth round with the 204th overall selection of the 2002 NFL draft.

In August 2002, Allen sprained a ligament in his knee that required surgery. He missed the entire 2002 NFL season, which he spent on the Colts' injured reserve list.

On September 9, 2003, the Colts waived Allen and placed him on their practice squad. He was released from the practice squad on September 23, 2003, before being re-signed by the Colts on October 15, 2003. He appeared in five games that season, mainly on special teams. Allen was again released by the Colts on November 20, 2003.

Allen was re-signed to the Colts' practice squad prior to the 2004 season. He underwent a second knee surgery prior to the season, and remained on the practice squad for the remainder of the year.

=== San Francisco 49ers ===
Allen was signed to the San Francisco 49ers practice squad on November 2, 2005. He was released following the 2005 season.

== Post-football career ==
After his NFL career, Allen worked as a corporate paralegal at Wilson Sonsini Goodrich & Rosati and as an investment banking analyst at WR Hambrecht + Co. At WR Hambrecht + Co, Allen worked on several transactions during his tenure, the most notable being the United Football League with William Hambrecht (Hambrecht & Quist). Allen works for Fidelity Investments as a financial consultant.

Allen currently resides in the Portland, Oregon metro area with his wife and two children. In his free time, Allen is an avid fitness guru.
