= Ariko Iso =

US athletic trainer

Colorado Buffaloes
- Title: Associate athletic trainer for football

Personal information
- Born: December 7, 1970 (age 55); Tokyo, Japan

Career information
- College: Oregon State University (BS) San Jose State University (MA)

Career history
- Foothill College Assistant athletic trainer (1994-1997); Portland State University Associate athletic trainer/head football trainer (1997-2002); Pittsburgh Steelers Assistant athletic trainer (2002-2010); Oregon State University Head football athletic trainer (2011-2017); San Jose State University Associate athletic trainer (2017-2018); Towson University Head football athletic trainer (2018-2019); Los Angeles Wildcats Head athletic trainer (2020); Loyola University Assistant athletic trainer (2020-2021); University of Colorado Boulder Associate athletic trainer (2021-present)

Awards and highlights
- 2× Super Bowl champion (XL, XLIII)

Ariko Iso (磯 有理子, Iso Ariko) (born December 7, 1970, in Tokyo, Japan) is the associate athletic trainer for football for the University of Colorado Buffaloes. In 2002, Iso became the first full-time female athletic trainer in the National Football League, joining the Pittsburgh Steelers. On June 1, 2011, Ariko announced she was leaving the Steelers and returning to her alma mater Oregon State University to become the head football athletic trainer for the Beavers effective June 10, 2011.

On June 6, 2018, Ariko became the head athletic trainer for Towson University’s football team. She was hired by Colorado in 2021.

Iso became interested in athletic training after tearing her ACL while playing basketball and after hearing Oregon State University exercise physiologist Chris Zauner while in high school in Tokyo. Iso then attended Oregon State, earning her bachelor's degree in 1993. She then attended San Jose State University and earned her master's degree in 1995. She began athletic training while at San Jose State and worked at the 1994 FIFA World Cup. She was hired by Portland State University in 1996. At Portland State she worked with women's basketball, wrestling, and track and field before becoming the head football athletic trainer. In 2000 and 2001 she worked as an intern at the Steelers' training camp. She was hired by the Steelers in 2002 to fill an open position, becoming the NFL's first full-time female athletic trainer. When hired, Iso became just the third female in male professional sports, with two in the NBA. She worked at the 2005 Pro Bowl with Steelers coach Bill Cowher in Honolulu, Hawaii. As the Steelers' assistant athletic trainer, Iso was responsible for reviewing applications for the team's summer program that she previously participated in. Of all the applications, Iso said she received 100–200 from women.
