= Jake Schifino =

American football player (born 1979)

No. 81
- Position: Wide receiver

Personal information
- Born: November 15, 1979 (age 46); Pittsburgh, Pennsylvania, U.S.
- Listed height: 6 ft 1 in (1.85 m)
- Listed weight: 200 lb (91 kg)

Career information
- High school: Penn Hills (Pittsburgh)
- College: Akron
- NFL draft: 2002: 5th round, 151st overall pick

Career history
- Tennessee Titans (2002–2004); New England Patriots (2005)*; Houston Texans (2006)*
- * Offseason or practice squad member only

Career NFL statistics
- Return yards: 703
- Stats at Pro Football Reference

Vernon Martin "Jake" Schifino (born November 15, 1979) is an American former professional football player who was a wide receiver in the National Football League (NFL). Schifino played college football for the Akron Zips and was selected in the fifth round of the 2002 NFL draft by the Tennessee Titans. He has also spent time with the Houston Texans.

== Personal life ==
Vernon Schifino was born to Rosetta Schifino and Vernon Schifino Sr.. He was born in Pittsburgh, Pennsylvania. He has three children and is related to Jalen Hood-Schifino and DeAndre Schifino.
