= 1996 Houston Oilers season =

37th season in franchise history, final one in Houston

- Owner: Bud Adams
- General manager: Floyd Reese
- Head coach: Jeff Fisher
- Offensive coordinator: Jerry Rhome
- Defensive coordinator: Steve Sidwell
- Home stadium: Houston Astrodome

Results
- Record: 8–8
- Division place: 4th AFC Central
- Playoffs: Did not qualify
- Pro Bowlers: OLB John Henry Mills; SS Blaine Bishop

Uniform
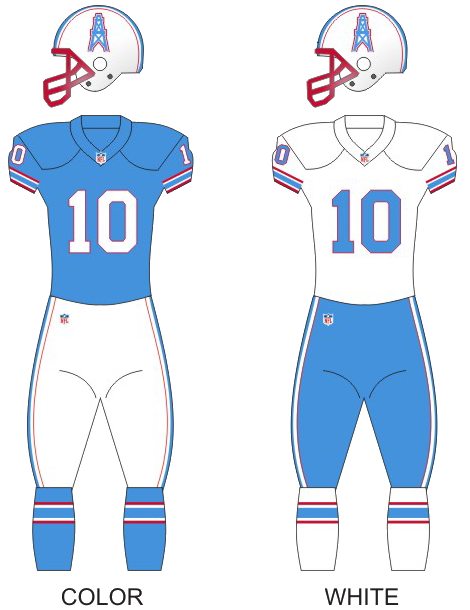

The 1996 Houston Oilers season was the 37th season overall and 27th with the National Football League (NFL) and their final season in Houston. The team bested their previous season's output of 7–9, but failed to qualify for the playoffs for the third consecutive season. The Oilers only won two out of their eight games at home. However, on the road they won six out of eight games as the Oilers finished with an 8–8 record. Houston running back Eddie George won the Offensive Rookie of the Year with 1,368 yards rushing. Despite finishing 8–8, the Oilers failed to sell out any of its home games at the Houston Astrodome for the second consecutive season.

The Oilers had already established itself as a lame duck franchise; the league had approved the team's relocation to Nashville, Tennessee a year ahead of schedule, although it was not originally scheduled to take place until 1998. With the team having given up on Houston, the city responded in kind: fan support and attendance dropped to negligible levels for the 1996 season, the team's radio network was all but disbanded, and the local broadcasts were being cut off in favor of preseason NBA basketball. The Oilers, unwilling to continue in Houston after such a debacle, quickly moved to Memphis, Tennessee's Liberty Bowl Memorial Stadium in 1997, becoming the Tennessee Oilers (Memphis, too, would reject the "temporary" housing of the Oilers, forcing the team to move to Vanderbilt Stadium in Nashville until the new Nashville stadium was finished in 1999).

== Offseason ==
=== NFL draft ===
1996 Houston Oilers draft
Round	Pick	Player	Position	College	Notes
1	14	Eddie George *	Running back	Ohio State	
2	38	Bryant Mix	Defensive end	Alcorn State	
2	48	Jason Layman	Offensive tackle	Tennessee	
3	74	Terry Killens	Linebacker	Penn State	
4	107	Kendrick Burton	Defensive end	Alabama	
4	109	Jon Runyan *	Offensive tackle	Michigan	
5	143	Rayna Stewart	Safety	Northern Arizona	
6	177	Anthony Dorsett	Cornerback	Pittsburgh	
7	218	Mike Archie	Running back	Penn State	
Made roster * Made at least one Pro Bowl during career

== Personnel ==
=== Staff ===
1996 Houston Oilers staff
Front office: Owner/chairman of the board/president – Bud Adams; Executive vice-president/general manager – Floyd Reese; Head coaches: Head coach – Jeff Fisher; Offensive coaches: Offensive coordinator – Jerry Rhome; Offensive assistant/passing game – Dick Coury; Running backs – Sherman Smith; Wide receivers/tight ends – Les Steckel; Offensive line – Rennie Simmons; Offensive assistant/quality control – Mike Munchak	Defensive coaches: Defensive coordinator – Steve Sidwell; Defensive line – Rex Norris; Linebackers – Gregg Williams; Defensive backs – Rod Perry; Defensive assistant/quality control – Alan Lowry; Special teams coaches: Special teams – Russ Purnell; Strength and conditioning: Strength and conditioning – Steve Watterson

=== Roster ===
1996 Houston Oilers roster
Quarterbacks (QB): 12 Chris Chandler; 9 Steve McNair; 16 James Ritchey; Running backs (RB): 32 Mike Archie; 27 Eddie George; 33 Ronnie Harmon; 20 Rodney Thomas; Wide receivers (WR): 86 Willie Davis; 83 Malcolm Floyd; 85 Derek Russell; 81 Chris Sanders; 82 Sheddrick Wilson; Tight ends (TE): 88 Roderick Lewis; 87 James McKeehan LS; 80 Michael Roan; 89 Frank Wycheck	Offensive linemen (OL): 77 Kevin Donnalley G; 72 Brad Hopkins T; 75 Irv Eatman T; 60 Hicham El-Mashtoub C; 71 Melvin Hayes T; 66 Jason Layman G/T; 74 Bruce Matthews G; 64 Erik Norgard C/G; 69 Jon Runyan T; 53 Mark Stepnoski C; Defensive linemen (DL): 94 Kendrick Burton DE; 78 Anthony Cook DE; 92 Henry Ford DT; 93 Mike Halapin DT; 97 Bryant Mix DT; 90 James Roberson DE; 96 Gary Walker DT; 99 Robert Young DE	Linebackers (LB): 56 Micheal Barrow OLB; 58 Joe Bowden OLB; 51 Lemanski Hall OLB; 57 Lenoy Jones OLB; 50 Terry Killens OLB; 55 John Henry Mills MLB; 52 Barron Wortham MLB; Defensive backs (DB): 23 Blaine Bishop SS; 39 Lee Cole CB; 28 Cris Dishman CB; 30 Anthony Dorsett CB; 24 Steve Jackson CB; 29 Darryll Lewis CB; 31 Marcus Robertson FS; 37 Rafael Robinson SS; 26 Rayna Stewart CB/S; Special teams (ST): 3 Al Del Greco K; 21 Mel Gray RS; 7 Reggie Roby P	Practice squad: 70 Ron Florine T; 5 Mitch Running WR; 18 Chris Sanders TE; Reserve: 91 Josh Evans DT (IR); 54 Al Smith LB (IR); 53 active, 2 inactive, 3 practice squad Rookies in italics

== Regular season ==
=== Schedule ===
Week	Date	Opponent	Result	Record	Venue	Attendance
1	September 1	Kansas City Chiefs	**L** 19–20	0–1	Astrodome	27,725
2	September 8	at **Jacksonville Jaguars**	**W** 34–27	1–1	Jacksonville Municipal Stadium	66,468
3	September 15	**Baltimore Ravens**	**W** 29–13	2–1	Astrodome	20,082
4	Bye					
5	September 29	at **Pittsburgh Steelers**	**L** 16–30	2–2	Three Rivers Stadium	58,608
6	October 6	at **Cincinnati Bengals**	**W** 30–27 (OT)	3–2	Cinergy Field	44,680
7	October 13	at Atlanta Falcons	**W** 23–13	4–2	Georgia Dome	35,401
8	October 20	**Pittsburgh Steelers**	**W** 23–13	5–2	Astrodome	50,337
9	October 27	San Francisco 49ers	**L** 9–10	5–3	Astrodome	53,664
10	November 3	at Seattle Seahawks	**L** 16–23	5–4	Kingdome	36,320
11	November 10	at New Orleans Saints	**W** 31–14	6–4	Louisiana Superdome	34,121
12	November 17	Miami Dolphins	**L** 20–23	6–5	Astrodome	47,358
13	November 24	Carolina Panthers	**L** 6–31	6–6	Astrodome	20,107
14	December 1	at New York Jets	**W** 35–10	7–6	Giants Stadium	21,731
15	December 8	**Jacksonville Jaguars**	**L** 17–23	7–7	Astrodome	20,196
16	December 15	**Cincinnati Bengals**	**L** 13–21	7–8	Astrodome	15,131
17	December 22	at **Baltimore Ravens**	**W** 24–21	8–8	Memorial Stadium	52,704
Note: Intra-division opponents are in **bold** text.

=== Standings ===
AFC Central
	W	L	T	PCT	PF	PA	STK
^{(3)} Pittsburgh Steelers	10	6	0	.625	344	257	L2
^{(5)} Jacksonville Jaguars	9	7	0	.563	325	335	W5
Cincinnati Bengals	8	8	0	.500	372	369	W3
Houston Oilers	8	8	0	.500	345	319	W1
Baltimore Ravens	4	12	0	.250	371	441	L3

=== Game summaries ===
==== Week 1: vs. Kansas City Chiefs ====
Week One: Kansas City Chiefs at Houston Oilers – Game summary

Quarter	1	2	3	4	Total
**Chiefs**	7	10	0	3	**20**
Oilers	10	6	0	3	**19**

at Astrodome, Houston, Texas

- Date: September 1
- Game time: 12:00 p.m. CDT
- Game weather: None (indoor stadium)
- Game attendance: 27,725
- TV announcers (NBC): Don Criqui and Beasley Reece (blacked out locally)
- Box score

Game information

**First quarter**

- HOU – Al Del Greco 34-yard field goal. Oilers 3–0.
- HOU – Willie Davis 34-yard pass from Chris Chandler (Al Del Greco kick). Oilers 10–0.
- KC – Tamarick Vanover 11-yard pass from Steve Bono (Pete Stoyanovich kick). Oilers 10–7.

**Second quarter**

- KC – Pete Stoyanovich 35-yard field goal. Tied 10–10.
- HOU – Al Del Greco 44-yard field goal. Oilers 13–10.
- HOU – Al Del Greco 33-yard field goal. Oilers 16–10.
- KC – Lake Dawson 23-yard pass from Steve Bono (Pete Stoyanovich kick). Chiefs 17–16.

**Third quarter**

- No scoring plays

**Fourth quarter**

- KC – Pete Stoyanovich 43-yard field goal. Chiefs 20–16.
- HOU – Al Del Greco 22-yard field goal. Chiefs 20–19.

**Top passers**

- KC – Steve Bono – 21/37, 192 yards, 2 TD
- HOU – Chris Chandler – 16/29, 216 yards, TD, INT

**Top rushers**

- KC – Kimble Anders – 5 rushes, 21 yards
- HOU – Eddie George – 21 rushes, 50 yards

**Top receivers**

- KC – Tamarick Vanover – 7 receptions, 76 yards, TD
- HOU – Chris Sanders – 2 receptions, 58 yards

==== Week 2: at Jacksonville Jaguars ====
Week Two: Houston Oilers at Jacksonville Jaguars – Game summary

Quarter	1	2	3	4	Total
**Oilers**	10	14	7	3	**34**
Jaguars	10	3	7	7	**27**

at Jacksonville Municipal Stadium, Jacksonville, Florida

- Date: September 8
- Game time: 12:00 p.m. CDT/1:00 p.m. EDT
- Game weather: 82 °F (28 °C)
- Game attendance: 66,468
- TV announcers (NBC): Dan Hicks and Bart Oates
- Box score

Game information

**First quarter**

- JAC – Mike Hollis 38-yard field goal. Jaguars 3–0.
- HOU – Al Del Greco 32-yard field goal. Tied 3–3.
- JAC – James Stewart 5-yard run (Mike Hollis kick). Jaguars 10–3.
- HOU – Eddie George 1-yard run (Al Del Greco kick). Tied 10–10.

**Second quarter**

- HOU – Malcolm Floyd 63-yard pass from Chris Chandler (Al Del Greco kick). Oilers 17–10.
- JAC – Mike Hollis 37-yard field goal. Oilers 17–13.
- HOU – Frank Wycheck 7-yard pass from Chris Chandler (Al Del Greco kick). Oilers 24–13.

**Third quarter**

- HOU – Willie Davis 11-yard pass from Chris Chandler (Al Del Greco kick). Oilers 31–13.
- JAC – Jimmy Smith 5-yard pass from Mark Brunell (Mike Hollis kick). Oilers 31–20.

**Fourth quarter**

- HOU – Al Del Greco 29-yard field goal. Oilers 34–20.
- JAC – Keenan McCardell 3-yard pass from Mark Brunell (Mike Hollis kick). Oilers 34–27.

**Top passers**

- HOU – Chris Chandler – 14/22, 226 yards, 3 TD
- JAC – Mark Brunell – 27/38, 302 yards, 2 TD, 2 INT

**Top rushers**

- HOU – Eddie George – 17 rushes, 143 yards, TD
- JAC – James Stewart – 17 rushes, 58 yards, TD

**Top receivers**

- HOU – Malcolm Floyd – 3 receptions, 90 yards, TD
- JAC – Keenan McCardell – 8 receptions, 100 yards, TD

==== Week 3: vs. Baltimore Ravens ====
Week Three: Baltimore Ravens at Houston Oilers – Game summary

Quarter	1	2	3	4	Total
Ravens	0	7	0	6	**13**
**Oilers**	14	3	9	3	**29**

at Astrodome, Houston, Texas

- Date: September 15
- Game time: 12:00 p.m. CDT
- Game weather: None (indoor stadium)
- Game attendance: 20,082
- TV announcers (NBC): Dan Hicks and Bart Oates (blacked out locally)
- Box score

Game information

**Top passers**

- HOU – Frank Wycheck 3-yard pass from Chris Chandler (Al Del Greco kick). Oilers 7–0.
- HOU – Willie Davis 18-yard pass from Chris Chandler (Al Del Greco kick). Oilers 14–0.

**Second quarter**

- BAL – Michael Jackson 7-yard pass from Vinny Testaverde (Matt Stover kick). Oilers 14–7.
- HOU – Al Del Greco 41-yard field goal. Oilers 17–7.

**Third quarter**

- HOU – Greg Montgomery run out of own end zone. Oilers 19–7.
- HOU – Ronnie Harmon 2-yard run (Al Del Greco kick). Oilers 26–7.

**Fourth quarter**

- HOU – Al Del Greco 44-yard field goal. Oilers 29–7.
- BAL – Herman Arvie 1-yard pass from Vinny Testaverde (pass failed). Oilers 29–13.

**Top passers**

- BAL – Vinny Testaverde – 25/40, 217 yards, 2 TD, 3 INT
- HOU – Chris Chandler – 16/27, 162 yards, 2 TD

**Top rushers**

- BAL – Earnest Byner – 19 rushes, 68 yards
- HOU – Eddie George – 17 rushes, 74 yards

**Top receivers**

- BAL – Michael Jackson – 6 receptions, 86 yards, TD
- HOU – Frank Wycheck – 6 receptions, 64 yards, TD

==== Week 5: at Pittsburgh Steelers ====
Week Five: Houston Oilers at Pittsburgh Steelers – Game summary

Quarter	1	2	3	4	Total
Oilers	0	0	14	2	**16**
**Steelers**	17	3	0	10	**30**

at Three Rivers Stadium, Pittsburgh, Pennsylvania

- Date: September 29
- Game time: 12:00 p.m. CDT/1:00 p.m. EDT
- Game weather: Mostly sunny, 53 °F (12 °C)
- Game attendance: 58,608
- Referee: Tom White
- TV announcers (NBC): Don Criqui and Beasley Reece
- Box score

Game information

**First quarter**

- PIT – Kordell Stewart 16-yard pass from Mike Tomczak (Norm Johnson kick). Steelers 7–0.
- PIT – Norm Johnson 33-yard field goal. Steelers 10–0.
- PIT – Charles Johnson 62-yard pass from Mike Tomczak (Norm Johnson kick). Steelers 17–0.

**Second quarter**

- PIT – Norm Johnson 36-yard field goal. Steelers 20–0.

**Third quarter**

- HOU – Willie Davis 4-yard pass from Chris Chandler (Al Del Greco kick). Steelers 20–7.
- HOU – Darryll Lewis 36-yard interception return (Al Del Greco kick). Steelers 20–14.

**Fourth quarter**

- PIT – Norm Johnson 36-yard field goal. Steelers 23–14.
- PIT – Darren Perry 13-yard interception return (Norm Johnson kick). Steelers 30–14.
- HOU – Shayne Edge run out of own end zone. Steelers 30–16.

**Top passers**

- HOU – Chris Chandler – 24/42, 207 yards, TD, 2 INT
- PIT – Mike Tomczak – 15/28, 202 yards, 2 TD, INT

**Top rushers**

- HOU – Eddie George – 11 rushes, 47 yards
- PIT – Jerome Bettis – 29 rushes, 115 yards

**Top receivers**

- HOU – Ronnie Harmon – 6 receptions, 53 yards
- PIT – Charles Johnson – 3 receptions, 87 yards, TD

==== Week 6: at Cincinnati Bengals ====
Week Six: Houston Oilers at Cincinnati Bengals – Game summary

Quarter	1	2	3	4	OT	Total
**Oilers**	3	7	7	10	3	**30**
Bengals	0	13	7	7	0	**27**

at Cinergy Field, Cincinnati, Ohio

- Date: October 6
- Game time: 7:00 p.m. CDT/8:00 p.m. EDT
- Game weather: Clear, 59 °F (15 °C)
- Game attendance: 44,680
- TV announcers (TNT): Verne Lundquist and Pat Haden
- Box score

Game information

**First quarter**

- HOU – Al Del Greco 40-yard field goal. Oilers 3–0.

**Second quarter**

- CIN – Doug Pelfrey 41-yard field goal. Tied 3–3.
- HOU – Frank Wycheck 9-yard pass from Chris Chandler (Al Del Greco kick). Oilers 10–3.
- CIN – Jimmy Spencer 59-yard fumble return (Doug Pelfrey kick). Tied 10–10.
- CIN – Doug Pelfrey 31-yard field goal. Bengals 13–10.

**Third quarter**

- CIN – Jeff Cothran 2-yard run (Doug Pelfrey kick). Bengals 20–10.
- HOU – Eddie George 45-yard run (Al Del Greco kick). Bengals 20–17.

**Fourth quarter**

- HOU – Al Del Greco 32-yard field goal. Tied 20–20.
- CIN – Darnay Scott 1-yard pass from Jeff Blake (Doug Pelfrey kick). Bengals 27–20.
- HOU – Derek Russell 7-yard pass from Chris Chandler (Al Del Greco kick). Tied 27–27.

**Overtime**

- HOU – Al Del Greco 49-yard field goal. Oilers 30–27.

**Top passers**

- HOU – Chris Chandler – 18/32, 193 yards, 2 TD, INT
- CIN – Jeff Blake – 18/37, 170 yards, TD

**Top rushers**

- HOU – Eddie George – 26 rushes, 152 yards, TD
- CIN – Garrison Hearst – 15 rushes, 90 yards

**Top receivers**

- HOU – Frank Wycheck – 7 receptions, 59 yards, TD
- CIN – Darnay Scott – 5 receptions, 56 yards, TD

==== Week 7: at Atlanta Falcons ====
Week Seven: Houston Oilers at Atlanta Falcons – Game summary

Quarter	1	2	3	4	Total
**Oilers**	7	3	7	6	**23**
Falcons	0	0	0	13	**13**

at Georgia Dome, Atlanta, Georgia

- Date: October 13
- Game time: 12:00 p.m. CDT/1:00 p.m. EDT
- Game weather: None (indoor stadium)
- Game attendance: 35,401
- TV announcers (NBC): Don Criqui and Beasley Reece
- Box score

Game information

**First quarter**

- HOU – Chris Sanders 62-yard pass from Chris Chandler (Al Del Greco kick). Oilers 7–0.

**Second quarter**

- HOU – Al Del Greco 27-yard field goal. Oilers 10–0.

**Third quarter**

- HOU – Steve McNair 10-yard run (Al Del Greco kick). Oilers 17–0.

**Fourth quarter**

- ATL – Terance Mathis 3-yard pass from Bobby Hebert (Morten Anderson kick). Oilers 17–7.
- HOU – Al Del Greco 33-yard field goal. Oilers 20–7.
- ATL – Terance Mathis 1-yard pass from Booby Hebert (pass failed). Oilers 20–13.

**Top passers**

- HOU – Chris Chandler – 9/13, 146 yards, TD
- ATL – Bobby Hebert – 31/46, 279 yards, 2 TD, 2 INT

**Top rushers**

- HOU – Eddie George – 23 rushes, 109 yards
- ATL – Jamal Anderson – 13 rushes, 45 yards

**Top receivers**

- HOU – Chris Sanders – 4 receptions, 100 yards, TD
- ATL – Roell Preston – 9 receptions, 69 yards

==== Week 8: vs. Pittsburgh Steelers ====
Week Eight: Pittsburgh Steelers at Houston Oilers – Game summary

Quarter	1	2	3	4	Total
Steelers	7	3	0	3	**13**
**Oilers**	3	6	0	14	**23**

at Astrodome, Houston, Texas

- Date: October 20
- Game time: 3:00 p.m. CDT
- Game weather: None (indoor stadium)
- Game attendance: 50,337
- Referee: Red Cashion
- TV announcers (NBC): Don Criqui and Beasley Reece (blacked out locally)
- Box score

Game information

**First quarter**

- HOU – Al Del Greco 22-yard field goal. Oilers 3–0.
- PIT – Charles Johnson 70-yard pass from Mike Tomczak (Norm Johnson kick). Steelers 7–3.

**Second quarter**

- PIT – Norm Johnson 26-yard field goal. Steelers 10–3.
- HOU – Al Del Greco 32-yard field goal. Steelers 10–6.
- HOU – Al Del Greco 48-yard field goal. Steelers 10–9.

**Third quarter**

- No scoring plays

**Fourth quarter**

- PIT – Norm Johnson 29-yard field goal. Steelers 13–9.
- HOU – Willie Davis 34-yard pass from Chris Chandler (Al Del Greco kick). Oilers 16–13.
- HOU – Eddie George 2-yard run (Al Del Greco kick). Oilers 23–13.

**Top passers**

- PIT – Mike Tomczak – 13/29, 199 yards, TD
- HOU – Chris Chandler – 23/38, 258 yards, TD, INT

**Top rushers**

- PIT – Jerome Bettis – 18 rushes, 65 yards
- HOU – Eddie George – 25 rushes, 65 yards, TD

**Top receivers**

- PIT – Charles Johnson – 5 receptions, 155 yards, TD
- HOU – Willie Davis – 6 receptions, 88 yards, TD

This would be the second-highest attended game of the season at the Astrodome, with a recorded of attendance of 50,337; however, many of these fans were Steelers' fans. Despite their home stadium being invaded by fans of the opposing team, the Oilers would win the game 23–13. This would be the last game the Oilers would win at the Astrodome.

==== Week 9: vs. San Francisco 49ers ====
Week Nine: San Francisco 49ers at Houston Oilers – Game summary

Quarter	1	2	3	4	Total
**49ers**	3	0	0	7	**10**
Oilers	0	6	0	3	**9**

at Astrodome, Houston, Texas

- Date: October 27
- Game time: 12:00 p.m. CST
- Game weather: None (indoor stadium)
- Game attendance: 53,664
- TV announcers (Fox): Dick Stockton and Matt Millen (blacked out locally)
- Box score

Game information

**First quarter**

- SF – Jeff Wilkins 27-yard field goal. 49ers 3–0.

**Second quarter**

- HOU – Al Del Greco 38-yard field goal. Tied 3–3.
- HOU – Al Del Greco 56-yard field goal. Oilers 6–3.

**Third quarter**

- HOU – Al Del Greco 39-yard field goal. Oilers 9–3.

**Fourth quarter**

- SF – Terrell Owens 20-yard pass from Jeff Brohm (Jeff Wilkins kick). 49ers 10–9.

**Top passers**

- SF – Jeff Brohm – 19/30, 176 yards, TD
- HOU – Chris Chandler – 7/18, 57 yards

**Top rushers**

- SF – Terry Kirby – 12 rushes, 23 yards
- HOU – Eddie George – 22 rushes, 77 yards

**Top receivers**

- SF – Terrell Owens – 4 receptions, 42 yards, TD
- HOU – Derek Russell – 3 receptions, 45 yards

With a recorded attendance of 53,664, this would be the highest attended game of the season at the Astrodome. Like the previous game, many of the fans in attendance were rooting for the opposing team. The Oilers led for most of the game, but Jeff Brohm would lead the 49ers on what would be the game-winning drive with a 20-yard touchdown pass to rookie wide receiver Terrell Owens early in the fourth quarter. The Oilers would have two more chances to take the lead back, but turned the ball over on downs on one drive and quarterback Steve McNair (who had replaced an ineffective Chris Chandler) threw an interception on the Oilers' final drive.

==== Week 10: at Seattle Seahawks ====
Week Ten: Houston Oilers at Seattle Seahawks – Game summary

Quarter	1	2	3	4	Total
Oilers	3	0	3	10	**16**
**Seahawks**	3	3	3	14	**23**

at Kingdome, Seattle, Washington

- Date: November 3
- Game time: 3:00 p.m. CST/1:00 p.m. PST
- Game weather: None (indoor stadium)
- Game attendance: 36,320
- Referee: Johnny Grier
- TV announcers (NBC): Dan Hicks and Bob Golic
- Box score

Game information

**First quarter**

- HOU – Al Del Greco 35-yard field goal. Oilers 3–0.
- SEA – Todd Peterson 25-yard field goal. Tied 3–3.

**Second quarter**

- SEA – Todd Peterson 35-yard field goal. Seahawks 6–3.

**Third quarter**

- HOU – Al Del Greco 36-yard field goal. Tied 6–6.
- SEA – Todd Peterson 44-yard field goal. Seahawks 9–6.

**Fourth quarter**

- HOU – Al Del Greco 45-yard field goal. Tied 9–9.
- HOU – Chris Sanders 65-yard pass from Steve McNair (Al Del Greco kick). Oilers 16–9.
- SEA – Joey Galloway 14-yard pass from John Friesz (Todd Peterson kick). Tied 16–16.
- SEA – Robert Blackmon 61-yard blocked field goal return (Todd Peterson kick). Seahawks 23–16.

**Top passers**

- HOU – Steve McNair – 12/18, 225 yards, TD, INT
- SEA – John Friesz – 24/38, 323 yards, TD, INT

**Top rushers**

- HOU – Eddie George – 25 rushes, 91 yards
- SEA – Chris Warren – 16 rushes, 34 yards

**Top receivers**

- HOU – Chris Sanders – 1 reception, 65 yards, TD
- SEA – Joey Galloway – 8 receptions, 94 yards, TD

==== Week 11: at New Orleans Saints ====
Week Eleven: Houston Oilers at New Orleans Saints – Game summary

Quarter	1	2	3	4	Total
**Oilers**	14	7	7	3	**31**
Saints	3	3	0	8	**14**

at Louisiana Superdome, New Orleans, Louisiana

- Date: November 10
- Game time: 12:00 p.m. CST
- Game weather: None (indoor stadium)
- Game attendance: 34,121
- TV announcers (NBC): Dan Hicks and Bart Oates
- Box score

Game information

**First quarter**

- HOU – Chris Sanders 42-yard pass from Chris Chandler (Al Del Greco kick). Oilers 7–0.
- HOU – Ronnie Harmon 11-yard pass from Chris Chandler (Al Del Greco kick). Oilers 14–0.
- NO – Doug Brien 29-yard field goal. Oilers 14–3.

**Second quarter**

- HOU – Erik Norgard 1-yard pass from Chris Chandler (Al Del Greco kick). Oilers 21–3.
- NO – Doug Brien 49-yard field goal. Oilers 21–6.

**Third quarter**

- HOU – Eddie George 1-yard run (Al Del Greco kick). Oilers 28–6.

**Fourth quarter**

- NO – Michael Haynes 34-yard pass from Jim Everett (Michael Haynes run). Oilers 28–14.
- HOU – Al Del Greco 25-yard field goal. Oilers 31–14.

**Top passers**

- HOU – Chris Chandler – 13/21, 173 yards, 3 TD, INT
- NO – Jim Everett – 16/33, 169 yards, TD

**Top rushers**

- HOU – Eddie George – 25 rushes, 91 yards, TD
- NO – Ray Zellars – 17 rushes, 60 yards

**Top receivers**

- HOU – Ronnie Harmon – 7 receptions, 108 yards, TD
- NO – Michael Haynes – 2 receptions, 48 yards, TD

==== Week 12: vs. Miami Dolphins ====
Week Twelve: Miami Dolphins at Houston Oilers – Game summary

Quarter	1	2	3	4	Total
**Dolphins**	0	10	3	10	**23**
Oilers	14	0	3	3	**20**

at Astrodome, Houston, Texas

- Date: November 17
- Game time: 3:00 p.m. CST
- Game weather: None (indoor stadium)
- Game attendance: 47,358
- TV announcers (NBC): Tom Hammond and Bob Trumpy (blacked out locally)
- Box score

Game information

**First quarter**

- HOU – Derek Russell 18-yard pass from Chris Chandler (Al Del Greco kick). Oilers 7–0.
- HOU – Frank Wycheck 15-yard pass from Chris Chandler (Al Del Greco kick). Oilers 14–0.

**Second quarter**

- MIA – Irving Spikes 10-yard pass from Dan Marino (Joe Nedney kick). Oilers 14–7.
- MIA – Joe Nedney 34-yard field goal. Oilers 14–10.

**Third quarter**

- MIA – Joe Nedney 44-yard field goal. Oilers 14–13.
- HOU – Al Del Greco 30-yard field goal. Oilers 17–13.

**Fourth quarter**

- MIA – Zach Thomas 26-yard interception return (Joe Nedney kick). Dolphins 20–17.
- HOU – Al Del Greco 33-yard field goal. Tied 20–20.
- MIA – Joe Nedney 29-yard field goal. Dolphins 23–20.

**Top passers**

- MIA – Dan Marino – 21/28, 237 yards, TD
- HOU – Chris Chandler – 15/27, 167 yards, 2 TD, INT

**Top rushers**

- MIA – Karim Abdul-Jabbar – 18 rushes, 59 yards
- HOU – Eddie George – 15 rushes, 60 yards

**Top receivers**

- MIA – O. J. McDuffie – 8 receptions, 86 yards
- HOU – Frank Wycheck – 5 receptions, 54 yards, TD

==== Week 13: vs. Carolina Panthers ====
Week Thirteen: Carolina Panthers at Houston Oilers – Game summary

Quarter	1	2	3	4	Total
**Panthers**	0	10	7	14	**31**
Oilers	0	3	0	3	**6**

at Astrodome, Houston, Texas

- Date: November 24
- Game time: 12:00 p.m. CST
- Game weather: None (indoor stadium)
- Game attendance: 20,107
- TV announcers (Fox): Kevin Harlan and Jerry Glanville (blacked out locally)
- Box score

Game information

**First quarter**

- No scoring plays

**Second quarter**

- CAR – Willie Green 30-yard pass from Steve Beuerlein (John Kasay kick). Panthers 7–0.
- HOU – Al Del Greco 24-yard field goal. Panthers 7–3.
- CAR – John Kasay 49-yard field goal. Panthers 10–3.

**Third quarter**

- CAR – Willie Green 12-yard pass from Steve Beuerlein (John Kasay kick). Panthers 17–3.

**Fourth quarter**

- HOU – Al Del Greco 45-yard field goal. Panthers 17–6.
- CAR – Sam Mills 41-yard fumble return (John Kasay kick). Panthers 24–6.
- CAR – Wesley Walls 40-yard pass from Steve Beuerlein (John Kasay kick). Panthers 31–6.

**Top passers**

- CAR – Steve Beuerlein – 11/18, 165 yards, 3 TD
- HOU – Chris Chandler – 13/22, 116 yards, INT

**Top rushers**

- CAR – Anthony Johnson – 27 rushes, 86 yards
- HOU – Eddie George – 19 rushes, 62 yards

**Top receivers**

- CAR – Wesley Walls – 3 receptions, 60 yards, TD
- HOU – Chris Sanders – 4 receptions, 44 yards

==== Week 14: at New York Jets ====
Week Fourteen: Houston Oilers at New York Jets – Game summary

Quarter	1	2	3	4	Total
**Oilers**	14	7	0	14	**35**
Jets	0	10	0	0	**10**

at Giants Stadium, East Rutherford, New Jersey

- Date: December 1
- Game time: 3:00 p.m. CST/4:00 p.m. EST
- Game weather: 51 °F (11 °C)
- Game attendance: 21,731
- TV announcers (NBC): Charlie Jones, Randy Cross and Len Berman
- Box score

Game information

**First quarter**

- HOU – Frank Wycheck 23-yard pass from Steve McNair (Al Del Greco kick). Oilers 7–0.
- HOU – Chris Sanders 83-yard pass from Steve McNair (Al Del Greco kick). Oilers 14–0.

**Second quarter**

- NYJ – Nick Lowery 30-yard field goal. Oilers 14–3.
- HOU – Eddie George 35-yard run (Al Del Greco kick). Oilers 21–3.
- NYJ – Keyshawn Johnson 18-yard pass from Frank Reich (Nick Lowery kick). Oilers 21–10.

**Third quarter**

- No scoring plays

**Fourth quarter**

- HOU – Eddie George 1-yard run (Al Del Greco kick). Oilers 28–10.
- HOU – Rodney Thomas 24-yard run (Al Del Greco kick). Oilers 35–10.

**Top passers**

- HOU – Steve McNair – 6/17, 142 yards, 2 TD
- NYJ – Frank Reich – 13/27, 154 yards, TD

**Top rushers**

- HOU – Eddie George – 28 rushes, 141 yards, 2 TD
- NYJ – Adrian Murrell – 14 rushes, 63 yards

**Top receivers**

- HOU – Chris Sanders – 3 receptions, 102 yards, TD
- NYJ – Keyshawn Johnson – 3 receptions, 48 yards, TD

==== Week 15: vs. Jacksonville Jaguars ====
Week Fifteen: Jacksonville Jaguars at Houston Oilers – Game summary

Quarter	1	2	3	4	Total
**Jaguars**	7	3	7	6	**23**
Oilers	0	7	0	10	**17**

at Astrodome, Houston, Texas

- Date: December 8
- Game time: 12:00 p.m. CST
- Game weather: None (indoor stadium)
- Game attendance: 20,196
- TV announcers (NBC): Jim Donovan and Beasley Reece (blacked out locally)
- Box score

Game information

**First quarter**

- JAC – Natrone Means 1-yard run (Mike Hollis kick). Jaguars 7–0.

**Second quarter**

- HOU – Ronnie Harmon 23-yard pass from Steve McNair (Al Del Greco kick). Tied 7–7.
- JAC – Mike Hollis 34-yard field goal. Jaguars 10–7.

**Third quarter**

- JAC – Natrone Means 5-yard run (Mike Hollis kick). Jaguars 17–7.

**Fourth quarter**

- HOU – Eddie George 6-yard run (Al Del Greco kick). Jaguars 17–14.
- JAC – Mike Hollis 38-yard field goal. Jaguars 20–14.
- JAC – Mike Hollis 31-yard field goal. Jaguars 23–14.
- HOU – Al Del Greco 27-yard field goal. Jaguars 23–17.

**Top passers**

- JAC – Mark Brunell – 15/25, 172 yards
- HOU – Steve McNair – 24/37, 308 yards, TD, INT

**Top rushers**

- JAC – Natrone Means – 25 rushes, 67 yards, 2 TD
- HOU – Eddie George – 16 rushes, 45 yards, TD

**Top receivers**

- JAC – Keenan McCardell – 3 receptions, 68 yards
- HOU – Chris Sanders – 7 receptions, 127 yards

==== Week 16: vs. Cincinnati Bengals ====
Week Sixteen: Cincinnati Bengals at Houston Oilers – Game summary

Quarter	1	2	3	4	Total
**Bengals**	0	0	14	7	**21**
Oilers	3	3	0	7	**13**

at Astrodome, Houston, Texas

- Date: December 15
- Game time: 12:00 p.m. CST
- Game weather: None (indoor stadium)
- Game attendance: 15,131
- TV announcers (NBC): Jim Lampley and Bob Golic (blacked out locally)
- Box score

Game information

**First quarter**

- HOU – Al Del Greco 46-yard field goal. Oilers 3–0.

**Second quarter**

- HOU – Al Del Greco 42-yard field goal. Oilers 6–0.

**Third quarter**

- CIN – James Hundon 14-yard pass from Jeff Blake (Doug Pelfrey kick). Bengals 7–6.
- CIN – James Francis 42-yard interception return (Doug Pelfrey kick). Bengals 14–6.

**Fourth quarter**

- CIN – Ki-Jana Carter 9-yard run (Doug Pelfrey kick). Bengals 21–6.
- HOU – Frank Wycheck 16-yard pass from Steve McNair (Al Del Greco kick). Bengals 21–13.

**Top passers**

- CIN – Jeff Blake – 13/23, 158 yards, TD
- HOU – Chris Chandler – 16/29, 178 yards, 3 INT

**Top rushers**

- CIN – Ki-Jana Carter – 4 rushes, 25 yards, TD
- HOU – Eddie George – 24 rushes, 76 yards

**Top receivers**

- CIN – David Dunn – 7 receptions, 95 yards
- HOU – Chris Sanders – 6 receptions, 89 yards

The Oilers would keep the Bengals scoreless in the first half, but were outscored 21–7 in the second half. This was the last game the Oilers would play in Houston. With the loss, the Oilers dropped to 7–8 and finished with a home record of 2–6.

During the 1995 season, owner Bud Adams announced that the team would be relocating to Tennessee. As a result, fan attendance had been abysmal for the 1996 season, with this game reaching a new low with a recorded attendance of only 15,131. The team's move to Tennessee was not scheduled to take place until 1998, but after a season of fan apathy that resulted in attendance woes, the NFL allowed Adams to move the team a year ahead of schedule. The Oilers would have stadium issues for the next two seasons, playing each season in a different temporary home. The team would play the next season at Liberty Bowl Memorial Stadium in Memphis, Tennessee before moving to Vanderbilt Stadium in Nashville, Tennessee for 1998. The team would find a new permanent home stadium in 1999 at the Adelphia Coliseum in Nashville, with the team being renamed to the Tennessee Titans.

An NFL game would not be played in Houston again until September 8, 2002, with Houston's new NFL franchise, the Houston Texans, defeating the Dallas Cowboys 19–10. The Oilers, then known as the Tennessee Titans, would return to Houston later that year on December 29 to play the Texans. Tennessee would win the game 13–3.

==== Week 17: at Baltimore Ravens ====
Week Seventeen: Houston Oilers at Baltimore Ravens – Game summary

Quarter	1	2	3	4	Total
**Oilers**	10	7	7	0	**24**
Ravens	7	0	0	14	**21**

at Memorial Stadium, Baltimore, Maryland

- Date: December 22
- Game time: 12:00 p.m. CST/1:00 p.m. EST
- Game weather: Cloudy, 27 °F (−3 °C)
- Game attendance: 52,704
- TV announcers (NBC): Jim Donovan and Bart Oates
- Box score

Game information

**First quarter**

- HOU – Eddie George 1-yard run (Al Del Greco kick). Oilers 7–0.
- BAL – Michael Jackson 86-yard pass from Vinny Testaverde (Matt Stover kick). Tied 7–7.
- HOU – Al Del Greco 37-yard field goal. Oilers 10–7.

**Second quarter**

- HOU – Willie Davis 19-yard pass from Steve McNair (Al Del Greco kick). Oilers 17–7.

**Third quarter**

- HOU – Steve McNair 24-yard run (Al Del Greco kick). Oilers 24–7.

**Fourth quarter**

- BAL – Michael Jackson 8-yard pass from Vinny Testaverde (Matt Stover kick). Oilers 24–14.
- BAL – Michael Jackson 4-yard pass from Vinny Testaverde (Matt Stover kick). Oilers 24–21.

**Top passers**

- HOU – Steve McNair – 19/24, 238 yards, TD
- BAL – Vinny Testaverde – 23/32, 307 yards, 3 TD, 2 INT

**Top rushers**

- HOU – Eddie George – 21 rushes, 85 yards, TD
- BAL – Bam Morris – 12 rushes, 81 yards

**Top receivers**

- HOU – Ronnie Harmon – 3 receptions, 72 yards
- BAL – Michael Jackson – 5 receptions, 117 yards, 3 TD

The Oilers traveled to Baltimore to take on the Ravens in the season finale. The Ravens' comeback attempt fell short, with the Oilers winning the game 24–21, finishing the franchise's last season as the Houston Oilers with an 8–8 record.
