= 1997 Tennessee Oilers season =

38th season in franchise history, first in Tennessee

- Inaugural season logo
- Owner: Bud Adams
- General manager: Floyd Reese
- Head coach: Jeff Fisher
- Offensive coordinator: Les Steckel
- Defensive coordinator: Gregg Williams
- Home stadium: Liberty Bowl Memorial Stadium

Results
- Record: 8–8
- Division place: 3rd AFC Central
- Playoffs: Did not qualify
- Pro Bowlers: RB Eddie George; G Bruce Matthews

Uniform
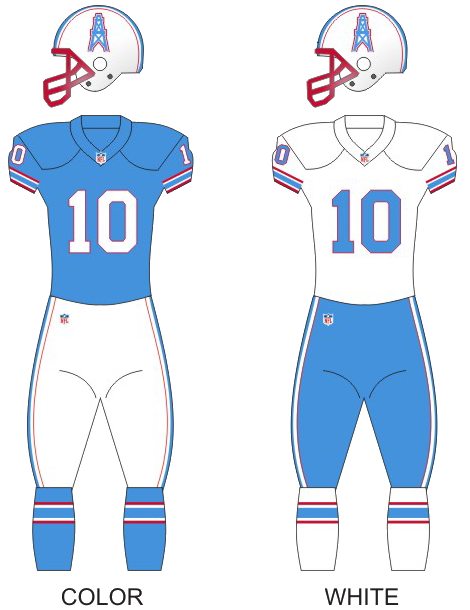

The 1997 Tennessee Oilers season was their 38th season overall and 28th in the National Football League (NFL). It was the team's only season in Memphis, Tennessee after moving from Houston, and they played at the Liberty Bowl Memorial Stadium.

Led by head coach Jeff Fisher, the Oilers finished the season with 8 wins and 8 losses, and did not qualify for the playoffs. Despite defeating the Oakland Raiders 24–21 in their first game in their new city, they lost the next four games and would not recover.

== Offseason ==
=== NFL draft ===
1997 Tennessee Oilers draft
Round	Pick	Player	Position	College	Notes
1	18	Kenny Holmes	Defensive end	Miami (FL)	
2	46	Joey Kent	Wide receiver	Tennessee	
3	75	Denard Walker	Cornerback	LSU	
3	81	Scott Sanderson	Offensive tackle	Washington State	
4	98	Derrick Mason *	Wide receiver	Michigan State	
4	107	Pratt Lyons	Defensive end	Troy	
5	143	George McCullough	Defensive back	Baylor	
6	181	Dennis Stallings	Linebacker	Illinois	
7	216	Armon Williams	Defensive back	Arizona	
Made roster * Made at least one Pro Bowl during career

== Personnel ==
=== Staff ===
1997 Tennessee Oilers staff
Front office: Owner/chairman of the board/president – Bud Adams; Executive vice-president/general manager – Floyd Reese; Director of player personnel – Rich Snead; Director of college scouting – Glenn Cumbee; Director of Regional Scouting – Mike Holovak; Head coaches: Head coach – Jeff Fisher; Offensive coaches: Offensive coordinator/quarterbacks – Les Steckel; Running backs – Sherman Smith; Wide receivers – Alan Lowry; Offensive line/tight ends – George Henshaw; Offensive line – Mike Munchak; Offensive assistant/quality control – Bart Andrus	Defensive coaches: Defensive coordinator – Gregg Williams; Defensive line – Rex Norris; Linebackers – O'Neill Gilbert; Defensive backs – Greg Brown; Defensive assistant/quality control – Jerry Gray; Special teams coaches: Special teams – Russ Purnell; Strength and conditioning: Strength and conditioning – Steve Watterson

=== Roster ===
1997 Tennessee Oilers roster
Quarterbacks (QB): 17 Dave Krieg; 9 Steve McNair; 16 James Ritchey; Running backs (RB): 22 Mike Archie; 27 Eddie George; 35 Spencer George; 20 Rodney Thomas KR; Wide receivers (WR): 83 Isaac Byrd; 86 Willie Davis; 86 Joey Kent; 82 Derrick Mason; 85 Derek Russell; 81 Chris Sanders; Tight ends (TE): 88 Roderick Lewis; 87 James McKeehan LS; 80 Michael Roan; 89 Frank Wycheck	Offensive linemen (OL): 77 Kevin Donnalley G; 71 Melvin Hayes T; 72 Brad Hopkins T; 66 Jason Layman G/T; 74 Bruce Matthews G; 64 Erik Norgard C/G; 69 Jon Runyan T; 73 Scott Sanderson G/T; 53 Mark Stepnoski C; Defensive linemen (DL): 78 Anthony Cook DE; 68 Eric England DE; 91 Josh Evans DT; 92 Henry Ford DT; 99 Kenny Holmes DE; 98 Pratt Lyons DE/DT; 97 Bryant Mix DT; 90 James Roberson DE; 96 Gary Walker DT	Linebackers (LB): 58 Joe Bowden OLB; 51 Lemanski Hall OLB; 57 Lenoy Jones MLB; 50 Terry Killens OLB; 56 Lonnie Marts OLB; 59 Dennis Stallings MLB; 52 Barron Wortham MLB; Defensive backs (DB): 23 Blaine Bishop SS; 30 Anthony Dorsett CB/S; 24 Steve Jackson CB; 29 Darryll Lewis CB; 28 George McCullough CB; 31 Marcus Robertson FS; 26 Rayna Stewart FS; 25 Denard Walker CB; 42 Armon Williams SS; Special teams (ST): 3 Al Del Greco K; 7 Reggie Roby P	Practice squad: 54 Louis Adams LB; 18 Isaiah Mustafa WR; 76 T. J. Washington T; Reserve: 94 Kendrick Burton DE (Susp.); 93 Mike Halapin DT (IR); 38 Roger Jones CB (IR); 53 active, 3 inactive, 3 practice squad Rookies in italics

== Preseason ==
Week	Date	Opponent	Result	Record	Venue	Recap
1	August 2	New Orleans Saints	L 12–21	0–1	Liberty Bowl Memorial Stadium	Recap
2	August 9	Washington Redskins	L 12–18	0–2	Vanderbilt Stadium	Recap
3	August 16	San Diego Chargers	L 7–21	0–3	Vanderbilt Stadium	Recap
4	August 22	at Dallas Cowboys	L 10–34	0–4	Texas Stadium	Recap

== Regular season ==
The Oilers' new stadium would not be ready until 1999, however, and the largest stadium in Nashville at the time, Vanderbilt Stadium on the campus of Vanderbilt University, seated only 41,000. At first, Bud Adams rejected Vanderbilt Stadium even as a temporary facility and announced that the renamed Tennessee Oilers would play the next two seasons at Liberty Bowl Memorial Stadium in Memphis. The team would be based in Nashville, commuting to Memphis only for games—in effect, consigning the Oilers to 32 road games for the next two years. Even though this arrangement was acceptable to the NFL and the Oilers at the time, few people in either Memphis or Nashville were pleased by it. Memphis had made numerous attempts to get an NFL team (including the Memphis Hound Dogs and the Memphis Grizzlies court case), and many people in the area wanted nothing to do with a team that would be lost in only two years—especially to longtime rival Nashville. Conversely, Nashvillians showed little inclination to drive over 200 miles (300 km) to see "their" team. As a result, attendance at the Liberty Bowl was disastrous: on at least two occasions, fewer than 18,000 fans came to the stadium to see the Oilers, a number smaller than the attendance figures the team was getting in Houston after they had announced the move, and smaller than the fan bases the USFL's Memphis Showboats and XFL's Memphis Maniax had drawn/would draw to the same stadium. If not for the attendance of fans supporting the Oilers' opponents, attendance would likely have even been smaller than it was for the CFL's Memphis Mad Dogs. Even in weeks when the Oilers drew over 30,000 fans (which only happened twice), many of the attendees were fans of the opposing team, padding the attendance totals.

=== Schedule ===
Week	Date	Opponent	Result	Record	Venue	Recap
1	August 31	Oakland Raiders	**W** 24–21 (OT)	1–0	Liberty Bowl Memorial Stadium	Recap
2	September 7	at Miami Dolphins	**L** 13–16 (OT)	1–1	Pro Player Stadium	Recap
3	Bye					
4	September 21	**Baltimore Ravens**	**L** 10–36	1–2	Liberty Bowl Memorial Stadium	Recap
5	September 28	at **Pittsburgh Steelers**	**L** 24–37	1–3	Three Rivers Stadium	Recap
6	October 5	at Seattle Seahawks	**L** 13–16	1–4	Kingdome	Recap
7	October 12	**Cincinnati Bengals**	**W** 30–7	2–4	Liberty Bowl Memorial Stadium	Recap
8	October 19	Washington Redskins	**W** 28–14	3–4	Liberty Bowl Memorial Stadium	Recap
9	October 26	at Arizona Cardinals	**W** 41–14	4–4	Sun Devil Stadium	Recap
10	November 2	**Jacksonville Jaguars**	**L** 24–30	4–5	Liberty Bowl Memorial Stadium	Recap
11	November 9	New York Giants	**W** 10–6	5–5	Liberty Bowl Memorial Stadium	Recap
12	November 16	at **Jacksonville Jaguars**	**L** 9–17	5–6	Alltel Stadium	Recap
13	November 23	Buffalo Bills	**W** 31–14	6–6	Liberty Bowl Memorial Stadium	Recap
14	November 27	at Dallas Cowboys	**W** 27–14	7–6	Texas Stadium	Recap
15	December 4	at **Cincinnati Bengals**	**L** 14–41	7–7	Cinergy Field	Recap
16	December 14	at **Baltimore Ravens**	**L** 19–21	7–8	Memorial Stadium	Recap
17	December 21	**Pittsburgh Steelers**	**W** 16–6	8–8	Liberty Bowl Memorial Stadium	Recap
Note: Intra-division opponents are in **bold** text.

=== Game summaries ===
==== Week 1: vs. Oakland Raiders ====
Week One: Oakland Raiders at Tennessee Oilers – Game summary

Quarter	1	2	3	4	OT	Total
Raiders	0	0	7	14	0	**21**
**Oilers**	10	0	3	8	3	**24**

at Liberty Bowl Memorial Stadium, Memphis, Tennessee

- Date: August 31
- Game time: 12:00 p.m. CDT
- Game weather: Partly cloudy, 81 °F (27 °C)
- Game attendance: 30,171
- Referee: Johnny Grier
- TV announcers (NBC): Don Criqui & Jim Mora
- Box score

Game information

**First quarter**

- TEN – Al Del Greco 30-yard field goal. Oilers 3–0.
- TEN – Chris Sanders 48-yard pass from Steve McNair (Al Del Greco kick). Oilers 10–0.

**Second quarter**

- No scoring plays

**Third quarter**

- TEN – Al Del Greco 37-yard field goal. Oilers 13–0.
- OAK – Tim Brown 59-yard pass from Jeff George (Cole Ford kick). Oilers 13–7.

**Fourth quarter**

- OAK – Tim Brown 27-yard pass from Jeff George (Cole Ford kick). Raiders 14–13.
- TEN – Eddie George 29-yard run (Eddie George run). Oilers 21–14.
- OAK – Tim Brown 16-yard pass from Jeff George (Cole Ford kick). Tied 21–21.

**Overtime**

- TEN – Al Del Greco 33-yard field goal. Oilers 24–21.

**Top passers**

- OAK – Jeff George – 21/37, 298 yards, 3 TD
- TEN – Steve McNair – 13/25, 182 yards, TD, INT

**Top rushers**

- OAK – Napoleon Kaufman – 12 rushes, 32 yards
- TEN – Eddie George – 35 rushes, 216 yards, TD

**Top receivers**

- OAK – Tim Brown – 8 receptions, 158 yards, 3 TD
- TEN – Ronnie Harmon – 5 receptions, 50 yards

==== Week 2: at Miami Dolphins ====
Week Two: Tennessee Oilers at Miami Dolphins – Game summary

Quarter	1	2	3	4	OT	Total
Oilers	0	10	3	0	0	**13**
**Dolphins**	0	3	3	7	3	**16**

at Pro Player Stadium, Miami Gardens, Florida

- Date: September 7
- Game time: 12:00 p.m. CDT/1:00 p.m. EDT
- Game weather: Cloudy, 81 °F (27 °C)
- Game attendance: 64,439
- Referee: Bill Carollo
- TV announcers (NBC): Don Criqui and Jim Mora
- Box score

Game information

**First quarter**

- No scoring plays

**Second quarter**

- MIA – Olindo Mare 23-yard field goal. Dolphins 3–0.
- TEN – Eddie George 13-yard run (Al Del Greco kick). Oilers 7–3.
- TEN – Al Del Greco 24-yard field goal. Oilers 10–3.

**Third quarter**

- MIA – Olindo Mare 22-yard field goal. Oilers 10–6.
- TEN – Al Del Greco 37-yard field goal. Oilers 13–6.

**Fourth quarter**

- MIA – Irving Spikes 2-yard run (Olindo Mare kick). Tied 13–13.

**Overtime**

- MIA – Olindo Mare 29-yard field goal. Dolphins 16–13.

**Top passers**

- TEN – Steve McNair – 7/14, 109 yards, INT
- MIA – Dan Marino – 24/43, 324 yards

**Top rushers**

- TEN – Eddie George – 23 rushes, 106 yards, TD
- MIA – Karim Abdul-Jabbar – 19 rushes, 33 yards

**Top receivers**

- TEN – Chris Sanders – 3 receptions, 58 yards
- MIA – O. J. McDuffie – 8 receptions, 135 yards

==== Week 4: vs. Baltimore Ravens ====
Week Four: Baltimore Ravens at Tennessee Oilers – Game summary

Quarter	1	2	3	4	Total
**Ravens**	3	17	3	13	**36**
Oilers	7	3	0	0	**10**

at Liberty Bowl Memorial Stadium, Memphis, Tennessee

- Date: September 21
- Game time: 12:00 p.m. CDT
- Game weather: Cloudy, 71 °F (22 °C)
- Game attendance: 17,737
- TV announcers (NBC): Joel Meyers & Beasley Reece
- Box score

Game information

**First quarter**

- BAL – Matt Stover 38-yard field goal. Ravens 3–0.
- TEN – Frank Wycheck 36-yard pass from Steve McNair (Al Del Greco kick). Oilers 7–3.

**Second quarter**

- BAL – Derrick Alexander 25-yard pass from Vinny Testaverde (Matt Stover kick). Ravens 10–7.
- BAL – Derrick Alexander 5-yard pass from Vinny Testaverde (Matt Stover kick). Ravens 17–7.
- TEN – Al Del Greco 45-yard field goal. Ravens 17–10.
- BAL – Matt Stover 42-yard field goal. Ravens 20–10.

**Third quarter**

- BAL – Matt Stover 41-yard field goal. Ravens 23–10.

**Fourth quarter**

- BAL – Jermaine Lewis 16-yard pass from Vinny Testaverde (Matt Stover kick). Ravens 30–10.
- BAL – Matt Stover 34-yard field goal. Ravens 33–10.
- BAL – Matt Stover 35-yard field goal. Ravens 36–10.

**Top passers**

- BAL – Vinny Testaverde – 23/37, 318 yards, 3 TD
- TEN – Steve McNair – 20/33, 199 yards, TD, INT

**Top rushers**

- BAL – Jay Graham – 9 rushes, 51 yards
- TEN – Eddie George – 10 rushes, 40 yards

**Top receivers**

- BAL – Jermaine Lewis – 8 receptions, 124 yards, TD
- TEN – Frank Wycheck – 3 receptions, 55 yards, TD

==== Week 5: at Pittsburgh Steelers ====
Week Five: Tennessee Oilers at Pittsburgh Steelers – Game summary

Quarter	1	2	3	4	Total
Oilers	0	6	3	15	**24**
**Steelers**	10	21	3	3	**37**

at Three Rivers Stadium, Pittsburgh, Pennsylvania

- Date: September 28
- Game time: 12:00 p.m. CDT/1:00 p.m. EDT
- Game weather: Cloudy, 60 °F (16 °C)
- Game attendance: 57,507
- Referee: Bernie Kukar
- TV announcers (NBC): Jim Donovan and Beasley Reece
- Box score

Game information

**First quarter**

- PIT – Kordell Stewart 7-yard run (Norm Johnson kick). Steelers 7–0.
- PIT – Norm Johnson 48-yard field goal. Steelers 10–0.

**Second quarter**

- PIT – Jason Gildon 12-yard fumble return (Norm Johnson kick). Steelers 17–0.
- TEN – Al Del Greco 37-yard field goal. Steelers 17–3.
- PIT – Mark Bruener 18-yard pass from Kordell Stewart (Norm Johnson kick). Steelers 24–3.
- PIT – Kordell Stewart 2-yard run (Norm Johnson kick). Steelers 31–3.
- TEN – Al Del Greco 47-yard field goal. Steelers 31–6.

**Third quarter**

- TEN – Al Del Greco 26-yard field goal. Steelers 31–9.
- PIT – Norm Johnson 25-yard field goal. Steelers 34–9.

**Fourth quarter**

- PIT – Norm Johnson 44-yard field goal. Steelers 37–9.
- TEN – Frank Wycheck 10-yard pass from Steve McNair (Steve McNair pass to Frank Wycheck). Steelers 37–17.
- TEN – Willie Davis 11-yard pass from Steve McNair (Al Del Greco kick). Steelers 37–24.

**Top passers**

- TEN – Steve McNair – 22/43, 266 yards, 2 TD, 2 INT
- PIT – Kordell Stewart – 16/24, 244 yards, TD

**Top rushers**

- TEN – Steve McNair – 3 rushes, 29 yards
- PIT – Jerome Bettis – 18 rushes, 74 yards

**Top receivers**

- TEN – Frank Wycheck – 9 receptions, 72 yards, TD
- PIT – Yancey Thigpen – 5 receptions, 89 yards

==== Week 6: at Seattle Seahawks ====
Week Six: Tennessee Oilers at Seattle Seahawks – Game summary

Quarter	1	2	3	4	Total
Oilers	3	7	0	3	**13**
**Seahawks**	0	0	10	6	**16**

at Kingdome, Seattle, Washington

- Date: October 5
- Game time: 3:00 p.m. CDT/1:00 p.m. PDT
- Game weather: None (indoor stadium)
- Game attendance: 49,897
- Referee: Dick Hantak
- TV announcers (NBC): Don Criqui & Jim Mora
- Box score

Game information

**First quarter**

- TEN – Al Del Greco 37-yard field goal. Oilers 3–0.

**Second quarter**

- TEN – Eddie George 11-yard pass from Steve McNair (Al Del Greco kick). Oilers 10–0.

**Third quarter**

- SEA – Todd Peterson 38-yard field goal. Oilers 10–3.
- SEA – Steve Broussard 77-yard run (Todd Peterson kick). Tied 10–10.

**Fourth quarter**

- SEA – Steve Broussard 43-yard run (kick failed). Seahawks 16–10.
- TEN – Al Del Greco 43-yard field goal. Seahawks 16–13.

**Top passers**

- TEN – Steve McNair – 12/28, 101 yards, TD, 2 INT
- SEA – Warren Moon – 27/40, 260 yards

**Top rushers**

- TEN – Eddie George – 26 rushes, 116 yards
- SEA – Steve Broussard – 6 rushes, 138 yards, 2 TD

**Top receivers**

- TEN – Frank Wycheck – 4 receptions, 41 yards
- SEA – Mike Pritchard – 7 receptions, 75 yards

==== Week 7: vs. Cincinnati Bengals ====
Week Seven: Cincinnati Bengals at Tennessee Oilers – Game summary

Quarter	1	2	3	4	Total
Bengals	0	0	0	7	**7**
**Oilers**	7	7	6	10	**30**

at Liberty Bowl Memorial Stadium, Memphis, Tennessee

- Date: October 12
- Game time: 12:00 p.m. CDT
- Game weather: Sunny, 74 °F (23 °C)
- Game attendance: 17,071
- TV announcers (NBC): Charlie Jones and Bob Trumpy
- Box score

Game information

**First quarter**

- TEN – Willie Davis 9-yard pass from Steve McNair (Al Del Greco kick). Oilers 7–0.

**Second quarter**

- TEN – Frank Wycheck 39-yard pass from Steve McNair (Al Del Greco kick). Oilers 14–0.

**Third quarter**

- TEN – Al Del Greco 47-yard field goal. Oilers 17–0.
- TEN – Al Del Greco 45-yard field goal. Oilers 20–0.

**Fourth quarter**

- TEN – Willie Davis 10-yard pass from Steve McNair (Al Del Greco kick). Oilers 27–0.
- TEN – Al Del Greco 19-yard field goal. Oilers 30–0.
- CIN – Corey Dillon 21-yard run (Doug Pelfrey kick). Oilers 30–7.

**Top passers**

- CIN – Jeff Blake – 14/28, 130 yards
- TEN – Steve McNair – 16/30, 199 yards, 3 TD

**Top rushers**

- CIN – Corey Dillon – 8 rushes, 39 yards, TD
- TEN – Eddie George – 30 rushes, 106 yards

**Top receivers**

- CIN – Eric Bieniemy – 5 receptions, 42 yards
- TEN – Frank Wycheck – 4 receptions, 78 yards, TD

==== Week 8: vs. Washington Redskins ====
Week Eight: Washington Redskins at Tennessee Oilers – Game summary

Quarter	1	2	3	4	Total
Redskins	0	0	14	0	**14**
**Oilers**	0	14	7	7	**28**

at Liberty Bowl Memorial Stadium, Memphis, Tennessee

- Date: October 19
- Game time: 12:00 p.m. CDT
- Game weather: Sunny, 55 °F (13 °C)
- Game attendance: 31,042
- Referee: Ron Blum
- TV announcers (FOX): Kevin Harlan & Bill Maas
- Box score

Game information

**First quarter**

- No scoring plays

**Second quarter**

- TEN – Steve McNair 2-yard run (Al Del Greco kick). Oilers 7–0.
- TEN – Eddie George 3-yard run (Al Del Greco kick). Oilers 14–0.

**Third quarter**

- TEN – Rodney Thomas 5-yard run (Al Del Greco kick). Oilers 21–0.
- WAS – Henry Ellard 13-yard pass from Gus Frerotte (Scott Blanton kick). Oilers 21–7.
- WAS – Henry Ellard 10-yard pass from Gus Frerotte (Scott Blanton kick). Oilers 21–14.

**Fourth quarter**

- TEN – Eddie George 6-yard run (Al Del Greco kick). Oilers 28–14.

**Top passers**

- WAS – Gus Frerotte – 16/31, 228 yards, 2 TD, 3 INT
- TEN – Steve McNair – 13/21, 192 yards

**Top rushers**

- WAS – Stephen Davis – 13 rushes, 45 yards
- TEN – Eddie George – 31 rushes, 125 yards, 2 TD

**Top receivers**

- WAS – Henry Ellard – 6 receptions, 84 yards, 2 TD
- TEN – Willie Davis – 5 receptions, 72 yards

==== Week 9: at Arizona Cardinals ====
Week Nine: Tennessee Oilers at Arizona Cardinals – Game summary

Quarter	1	2	3	4	Total
**Oilers**	3	17	14	7	**41**
Cardinals	0	0	7	7	**14**

at Sun Devil Stadium, Tempe, Arizona

- Date: October 26
- Game time: 3:00 p.m. CST/2:00 p.m. MST
- Game weather: Sunny, 62 °F (17 °C)
- Game attendance: 44,030
- TV announcers (NBC): Bob Fitzgerald and Jim Laslavic
- Box score

Game information

**First quarter**

- TEN – Al Del Greco 52-yard field goal. Oilers 3–0.

**Second quarter**

- TEN – Denard Walker 39-yard interception return (Al Del Greco kick). Oilers 10–0.
- TEN – Al Del Greco 42-yard field goal. Oilers 13–0.
- TEN – Steve McNair 35-yard run (Al Del Greco kick). Oilers 20–0.

**Third quarter**

- TEN – Steve McNair 2-yard run (Al Del Greco kick). Oilers 27–0.
- ARI – Rob Moore 12-yard pass from Jake Plummer (Joe Nedney kick). Oilers 27–7.
- TEN – Chris Sanders 55-yard pass from Steve McNair (Al Del Greco kick). Oilers 34–7.

**Fourth quarter**

- TEN – Chris Sanders 20-yard pass from Steve McNair (Al Del Greco kick). Oilers 41–7.
- ARI – Rob Moore 2-yard pass from Jake Plummer (Joe Nedney kick). Oilers 41–14.

**Top passers**

- TEN – Steve McNair – 9/17, 146 yards, 2 TD
- ARI – Jake Plummer – 21/40, 195 yards, 2 TD, 4 INT

**Top rushers**

- TEN – Eddie George – 17 rushes, 71 yards
- ARI – Larry Centers – 14 rushes, 57 yards

**Top receivers**

- TEN – Chris Sanders – 2 receptions, 75 yards, 2 TD
- ARI – Frank Sanders – 10 receptions, 98 yards

==== Week 10: vs. Jacksonville Jaguars ====
Week Ten: Jacksonville Jaguars at Tennessee Oilers – Game summary

Quarter	1	2	3	4	Total
**Jaguars**	17	7	3	3	**30**
Oilers	7	3	7	7	**24**

at Liberty Bowl Memorial Stadium, Memphis, Tennessee

- Date: November 2
- Game time: 3:00 p.m. CST
- Game weather: Partly cloudy, 55 °F (13 °C)
- Game attendance: 27,208
- TV announcers (NBC): Joel Meyers and Beasley Reece
- Box score

Game information

**First quarter**

- TEN – Darryl Lewis 47-yard interception return (Al Del Greco kick). Oilers 7–0.
- JAC – Mike Hollis 30-yard field goal. Oilers 7–3.
- JAC – Chris Hudson 32-yard fumble return (Mike Hollis kick). Jaguars 10–7.
- JAC – Pete Mitchell 6-yard pass from Mark Brunell (Mike Hollis kick). Jaguars 17–7.

**Second quarter**

- TEN – Al Del Greco 36-yard field goal. Jaguars 17–10.
- JAC – Mark Brunell 6-yard run (Mike Hollis kick). Jaguars 24–10.

**Third quarter**

- JAC – Mike Hollis 30-yard field goal. Jaguars 27–10.
- TEN – Rodney Thomas 3-yard run (Al Del Greco kick). Jaguars 27–17.

**Fourth quarter**

- JAC – Mike Hollis 37-yard field goal. Jaguars 30–17.
- TEN – Eddie George 5-yard run (Al Del Greco kick). Jaguars 30–24.

**Top passers**

- JAC – Mark Brunell – 17/31, 169 yards, TD, INT
- TEN – Steve McNair – 13/22, 211 yards, INT

**Top rushers**

- JAC – James Stewart – 17 rushes, 99 yards
- TEN – Eddie George – 17 rushes, 51 yards, TD

**Top receivers**

- JAC – Jimmy Smith – 5 receptions, 50 yards
- TEN – Willie Davis – 4 receptions, 83 yards

==== Week 11: vs. New York Giants ====
Week Eleven: New York Giants at Tennessee Oilers – Game summary

Quarter	1	2	3	4	Total
Giants	0	3	3	0	**6**
**Oilers**	3	7	0	0	**10**

at Liberty Bowl Memorial Stadium, Memphis, Tennessee

- Date: November 9
- Game time: 3:00 p.m. CST
- Game weather: Cloudy, 46 °F (8 °C)
- Game attendance: 26,744
- Referee: Walt Coleman
- TV announcers (Fox): Kenny Albert and Tim Green
- Box score

Game information

**First quarter**

- TEN – Al Del Greco 31-yard field goal. Oilers 3–0.

**Second quarter**

- TEN – Eddie George 1-yard run (Al Del Greco kick). Oilers 10–0.
- NYG – Brad Daluiso 42-yard field goal. Oilers 10–3.

**Third quarter**

- NYG – Brad Daluiso 41-yard field goal. Oilers 10–6.

**Fourth quarter**

- No scoring plays

**Top passers**

- NYG – Danny Kanell – 15/28, 133 yards, INT
- TEN – Steve McNair – 13/23, 183 yards, INT

**Top rushers**

- NYG – Tyrone Wheatley – 13 rushes, 94 yards
- TEN – Eddie George – 32 rushes, 122 yards, TD

**Top receivers**

- NYG – Chris Calloway – 4 receptions, 65 yards
- TEN – Chris Sanders – 3 receptions, 64 yards

==== Week 12: at Jacksonville Jaguars ====
Week Twelve: Tennessee Oilers at Jacksonville Jaguars – Game summary

Quarter	1	2	3	4	Total
Oilers	0	3	0	6	**9**
**Jaguars**	0	7	7	3	**17**

at Alltel Stadium, Jacksonville, Florida

- Date: November 16
- Game time: 12:00 p.m. CST/1:00 p.m. EST
- Game weather: Partly cloudy, 56 °F (13 °C)
- Game attendance: 70,070
- TV announcers (NBC): Don Criqui and Jim Mora
- Box score

Game information

**First quarter**

- No scoring plays

**Second quarter**

- JAC – Keenan McCardell 17-yard pass from Mark Brunell (Mike Hollis kick). Jaguars 7–0.
- TEN – Al Del Greco 35-yard field goal. Jaguars 7–3.

**Third quarter**

- JAC – Natrone Means 1-yard run (Mike Hollis kick). Jaguars 14–3.

**Fourth quarter**

- TEN – Frank Wycheck 22-yard pass from Willie Davis (run failed). Jaguars 14–9.
- JAC – Mike Hollis 23-yard field goal. Jaguars 17–9.

**Top passers**

- TEN – Steve McNair – 8/22, 162 yards, 2 INT
- JAC – Mark Brunell – 22/30, 267 yards, TD

**Top rushers**

- TEN – Rodney Thomas – 9 rushes, 54 yards
- JAC – Natrone Means – 23 rushes, 64 yards, TD

**Top receivers**

- TEN – Frank Wycheck – 3 receptions, 70 yards, TD
- JAC – Jimmy Smith – 8 receptions, 158 yards

==== Week 13: vs. Buffalo Bills ====
Week Thirteen: Buffalo Bills at Tennessee Oilers – Game summary

Quarter	1	2	3	4	Total
Bills	0	7	0	7	**14**
**Oilers**	14	7	3	7	**31**

at Liberty Bowl Memorial Stadium, Memphis, Tennessee

- Date: November 23
- Game time: 12:00 p.m. CST
- Game weather: Rain, 40 °F (4 °C)
- Game attendance: 23,571
- TV announcers (NBC): Joel Meyers and Beasley Reece
- Box score

Game information

**First quarter**

- TEN – Marcus Robertson 27-yard fumble return (Al Del Greco kick). Oilers 7–0.
- TEN – Steve McNair 1-yard run (Al Del Greco kick). Oilers 14–0.

**Second quarter**

- TEN – Steve McNair 3-yard run (Al Del Greco kick). Oilers 21–0.
- BUF – Quinn Early 9-yard pass from Todd Collins (Steve Christie kick). Oilers 21–7.

**Third quarter**

- TEN – Al Del Greco 51-yard field goal. Oilers 24–7.

**Fourth quarter**

- BUF – Quinn Early 6-yard pass from Todd Collins (Steve Christie kick). Oilers 24–14.
- TEN – Derek Russell 2-yard pass from Steve McNair (Al Del Greco kick). Oilers 31–14.

**Top passers**

- BUF – Todd Collins – 25/40, 286 yards, 2 TD, INT
- TEN – Steve McNair – 15/24, 167 yards, TD

**Top rushers**

- BUF – Antowain Smith – 9 rushes, 7 yards
- TEN – Eddie George – 25 rushes, 93 yards

**Top receivers**

- BUF – Quinn Early – 8 receptions, 103 yards, 2 TD
- TEN – Frank Wycheck – 6 receptions, 51 yards

==== Week 14: at Dallas Cowboys ====
Thanksgiving Day games

Week Fourteen: Tennessee Oilers at Dallas Cowboys – Game summary

Quarter	1	2	3	4	Total
**Oilers**	14	10	0	3	**27**
Cowboys	0	7	7	0	**14**

at Texas Stadium, Irving, Texas

- Date: November 27
- Game time: 3:00 p.m. CST
- Game weather: Clear, 66 °F (19 °C)
- Game attendance: 63,421
- TV announcers (NBC): Dick Enberg, Phil Simms and Paul Maguire
- Box score

Game information

**First quarter**

- TEN – Erik Norgard 2-yard pass from Steve McNair (Al Del Greco kick). Oilers 7–0.
- TEN – Steve McNair 1-yard run (Al Del Greco kick). Oilers 14–0.

**Second quarter**

- DAL – Michael Irvin 19-yard pass from Troy Aikman (Richie Cunningham kick). Oilers 14–7.
- TEN – Al Del Greco 29-yard field goal. Oilers 17–7.
- TEN – Marcus Robertson 42-yard fumble return (Al Del Greco kick). Oilers 24–7.

**Third quarter**

- DAL – Michael Irvin 37-yard pass from Troy Aikman (Richie Cunningham kick). Oilers 24–14.

**Fourth quarter**

- TEN – Al Del Greco 19-yard field goal. Oilers 27–14.

**Top passers**

- TEN – Steve McNair – 9/17, 81 yards, TD
- DAL – Troy Aikman – 27/42, 356 yards, 2 TD, 3 INT

**Top rushers**

- TEN – Eddie George – 34 rushes, 110 yards
- DAL – Emmitt Smith – 10 rushes, 22 yards

**Top receivers**

- TEN – Frank Wycheck – 3 receptions, 39 yards
- DAL – Michael Irvin – 5 receptions, 118 yards, 2 TD

==== Week 15: at Cincinnati Bengals ====
Week Fifteen: Tennessee Oilers at Cincinnati Bengals – Game summary

Quarter	1	2	3	4	Total
Oilers	0	0	0	14	**14**
**Bengals**	14	14	10	3	**41**

at Cinergy Field, Cincinnati, Ohio

- Date: December 4
- Game time: 7:00 p.m. CST/8:00 p.m. EST
- Game weather: Light rain, 42 °F (6 °C)
- Game attendance: 49,086
- TV announcers (ESPN): Mike Patrick, Joe Theismann and Ron Jaworski
- Box score

Game information

**First quarter**

- CIN – Corey Dillon 2-yard run (Doug Pelfrey kick). Bengals 7–0.
- CIN – Tony McGee 1-yard pass from Boomer Esiason (Doug Pelfrey kick). Bengals 14–0.

**Second quarter**

- CIN – Corey Dillon 31-yard run (Doug Pelfrey kick). Bengals 21–0.
- CIN – Corey Dillon 1-yard run (Doug Pelfrey kick). Bengals 28–0.

**Third quarter**

- CIN – Corey Dillon 2-yard run (Doug Pelfrey kick). Bengals 35–0.
- CIN – Doug Pelfrey 26-yard field goal. Bengals 38–0.

**Fourth quarter**

- TEN – Willie Davis 5-yard pass from Steve McNair (Al Del Greco kick). Bengals 38–7.
- CIN – Doug Pelfrey 40-yard field goal. Bengals 41–7.
- TEN – Joey Kent 11-yard pass from Steve McNair (Al Del Greco kick). Bengals 41–14.

**Top passers**

- TEN – Steve McNair – 14/25, 146 yards, 2 TD
- CIN – Boomer Esiason – 20/28, 245 yards, TD

**Top rushers**

- TEN – Steve McNair – 5 rushes, 16 yards
- CIN – Corey Dillon – 39 rushes, 246 yards, 4 TD

**Top receivers**

- TEN – Willie Davis – 4 receptions, 45 yards, TD
- CIN – Darnay Scott – 6 receptions, 83 yards

==== Week 16: at Baltimore Ravens ====
Week Sixteen: Tennessee Oilers at Baltimore Ravens – Game summary

Quarter	1	2	3	4	Total
Oilers	3	3	6	7	**19**
**Ravens**	7	7	0	7	**21**

at Memorial Stadium, Baltimore, Maryland

- Date: December 14
- Game time: 12:00 p.m. CST/1:00 p.m. EST
- Game weather: Partly cloudy, 35 °F (2 °C)
- Game attendance: 60,558
- TV announcers (NBC): Jim Donovan and James Lofton
- Box score

Game information

**First quarter**

- BAL – Michael Jackson 8-yard pass from Eric Zeier (Matt Stover kick). Ravens 7–0.
- TEN – Al Del Greco 25-yard field goal. Ravens 7–3.

**Second quarter**

- TEN – Al Del Greco 40-yard field goal. Ravens 7–6.
- BAL – Eric Green 37-yard pass from Eric Zeier (Matt Stover kick). Ravens 14–6.

**Third quarter**

- TEN – Steve McNair 15-yard run (run failed). Ravens 14–12.

**Fourth quarter**

- BAL – Derrick Alexander 19-yard pass from Eric Zeier (Matt Stover kick). Ravens 21–12.
- TEN – Steve McNair 1-yard run (Al Del Greco kick). Ravens 21–19.

**Top passers**

- TEN – Steve McNair – 22/45, 219 yards, INT
- BAL – Eric Zeier – 13/28, 204 yards, 3 TD

**Top rushers**

- TEN – Eddie George – 26 rushes, 129 yards
- BAL – Bam Morris – 18 rushes, 51 yards

**Top receivers**

- TEN – Chris Sanders – 7 receptions, 100 yards
- BAL – Eric Green – 3 receptions, 59 yards, TD

==== Week 17: vs. Pittsburgh Steelers ====
Week Seventeen: Pittsburgh Steelers at Tennessee Oilers – Game summary

Quarter	1	2	3	4	Total
Steelers	3	0	0	3	**6**
**Oilers**	3	10	3	0	**16**

at Liberty Bowl Memorial Stadium, Memphis, Tennessee

- Date: December 24
- Game time: 12:00 p.m. CST
- Game weather: Cloudy, 47 °F (8 °C)
- Game attendance: 50,677
- TV announcers (NBC): Charlie Jones and Bob Trumpy
- Box score

Game information

**First quarter**

- TEN – Al Del Greco 34-yard field goal. Oilers 3–0.
- PIT – Norm Johnson 23-yard field goal. Tied 3–3.

**Second quarter**

- TEN – Rodney Thomas 25-yard run (Al Del Greco kick). Oilers 10–3.
- TEN – Al Del Greco 29-yard field goal. Oilers 13–3.

**Third quarter**

- TEN – Al Del Greco 26-yard field goal. Oilers 16–3.

**Fourth quarter**

- PIT – Norm Johnson 36-yard field goal. Oilers 16–6.

**Top passers**

- PIT – Mike Tomczak – 8/11, 89 yards
- TEN – Steve McNair – 10/26, 102 yards, INT

**Top rushers**

- PIT – Fred McAfee – 10 rushes, 27 yards
- TEN – Rodney Thomas – 6 rushes, 41 yards, TD

**Top receivers**

- PIT – Yancey Thigpen – 6 receptions, 84 yards
- TEN – Derrick Mason – 3 receptions, 47 yards

=== Standings ===
AFC Central
	W	L	T	PCT	PF	PA	STK
^{(2)} Pittsburgh Steelers	11	5	0	.688	372	307	L1
^{(5)} Jacksonville Jaguars	11	5	0	.688	394	318	W2
Tennessee Oilers	8	8	0	.500	333	310	W1
Cincinnati Bengals	7	9	0	.438	355	405	W3
Baltimore Ravens	6	9	1	.406	326	345	L1
