= 1995 Houston Oilers season =

36th season in franchise history

- Owner: Bud Adams
- General manager: Floyd Reese
- Head coach: Jeff Fisher
- Offensive coordinator: Jerry Rhome
- Defensive coordinator: Steve Sidwell
- Home stadium: Houston Astrodome

Results
- Record: 7–9
- Division place: 3rd AFC Central
- Playoffs: Did not qualify

Uniform
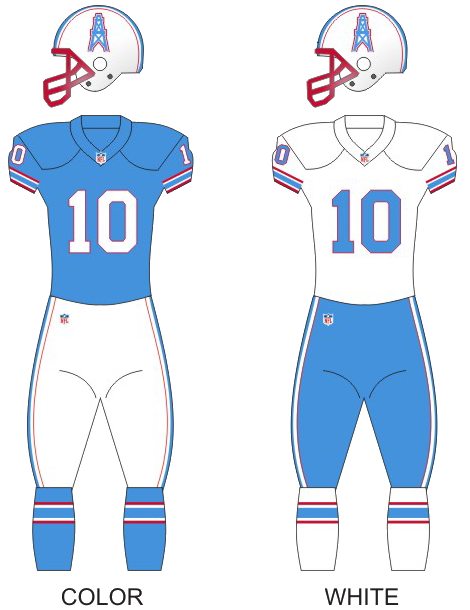

The 1995 NFL season was the 36th overall season of the Houston Oilers and their 26th with the National Football League (NFL). Their 7–9 record bested their previous season's output of 2–14, but they failed to qualify for the playoffs for the second consecutive year.

The Oilers drafted quarterback Steve McNair with the third overall draft pick, but he started the season on the bench behind free agent signee Chris Chandler, who played solid football as the team showed improvement in their first full year under Jeff Fisher. The story of the season came on November 16 when owner Bud Adams announced plans to move the team to Nashville when the lease at the Astrodome expired in 1998. The Oilers were the debut opponent of the expansion Jacksonville Jaguars, just as they had been with the 1976 Tampa Bay Buccaneers in the NFL's previous expansion.

== Offseason ==
=== NFL draft ===
1995 Houston Oilers draft
Round	Pick	Player	Position	College	Notes
1	3	Steve McNair *	Quarterback	Alcorn State	
2	35	Anthony Cook	Defensive end	South Carolina State	
3	67	Chris Sanders	Wide receiver	Ohio State	
3	89	Rodney Thomas	Running back	Texas A&M	
3	95	Torey Hunter	Cornerback	Washington State	
4	101	Michael Roan	Tight end	Wisconsin	
5	159	Gary Walker *	Defensive tackle	Auburn	
6	174	Hicham El-Mashtoub	Center	Arizona	
7	211	C. J. Richardson	Safety	Miami (FL)	
Made roster * Made at least one Pro Bowl during career

== Personnel ==
=== Staff / Coaches ===
1995 Houston Oilers staff
Front office: Owner/chairman of the board/president – Bud Adams; Executive vice-president/general manager – Floyd Reese; Head coaches: Head coach – Jeff Fisher; Offensive coaches: Offensive coordinator – Jerry Rhome; Offensive assistant/passing game – Dick Coury; Running backs – Sherman Smith; Wide receivers/tight ends – Les Steckel; Offensive line – Larry Beightol; Offensive assistant/quality control – Mike Munchak	Defensive coaches: Defensive coordinator – Steve Sidwell; Defensive line – Rex Norris; Linebackers – Gregg Williams; Defensive backs – Rod Perry; Defensive assistant/quality control – Clancy Pendergast; Special teams coaches: Special teams – Russ Purnell; Strength and conditioning: Strength and conditioning – Steve Watterson

=== Roster ===
1995 Houston Oilers roster
Quarterbacks (QB): 12 Chris Chandler; 17 Will Furrer; 9 Steve McNair; Running backs (RB): 33 Gary Brown; 35 Marion Butts; 44 Steve Hendrickson FB; 48 Todd McNair; 20 Rodney Thomas; Wide receivers (WR): 83 Malcolm Seabron; 82 Travis Hannah PR; 84 Haywood Jeffires; 85 Derek Russell; 81 Chris Sanders; 4 Jasper Strong; Tight ends (TE): 88 Roderick Lewis; 87 James McKeehan; 46 Michael Roan; 89 Frank Wycheck	Offensive linemen (OL): 77 Kevin Donnalley G; 70 Mark Hatfield T; 72 Brad Hopkins T; 75 Irv Eatman T; 60 Hicham El-Mashtoub C; 74 Bruce Matthews G; 64 Erik Norgard G; 67 Jim Reid G; 53 Mark Stepnoski C; Defensive linemen (DL): 78 Anthony Cook DE; 90 Kenny Davidson DE; 91 Josh Evans DT; 92 Henry Ford DE; 95 Kanavis McGhee DE; 94 Glenn Montgomery DT; 98 Natu Tuatagaloa DE; 71 Craig Veasey DE/DT; 96 Gary Walker DT	Linebackers (LB): 56 Micheal Barrow MLB; 58 Joe Bowden OLB; 51 Lemanski Hall OLB; 55 John Henry Mills MLB; 50 Eddie Robinson OLB; 52 Barron Wortham MLB; Defensive backs (DB): 22 Tomur Barnes CB; 23 Blaine Bishop SS; 26 Chuck Cecil FS; 28 Cris Dishman CB; 27 Odie Harris CB/S; 25 Torey Hunter CB; 24 Steve Jackson CB; 29 Darryll Lewis CB; Special teams (ST): 16 Rich Camarillo P; 3 Al Del Greco K; 21 Mel Gray RS	Practice squad: 59 Linc Harden LB; Reserve: 38 Bryan Addison S (IR); 79 Ray Childress DT (IR); 61 Purvis Hunt G (IR); 31 Marcus Robertson S (IR); 54 Al Smith LB (IR); 10 Lee Williamson QB (IR); 53 active, 6 inactive, 1 practice squad Rookies in italics

== Regular season ==
=== Schedule ===
Week	Date	Opponent	Result	Record	Venue	Recap
1	September 3	at **Jacksonville Jaguars**	**W** 10–3	1–0	Jacksonville Municipal Stadium	Recap
2	September 10	**Pittsburgh Steelers**	**L** 17–34	1–1	Astrodome	Recap
3	September 17	**Cleveland Browns**	**L** 7–14	1–2	Astrodome	Recap
4	September 24	at **Cincinnati Bengals**	**W** 38–28	2–2	Riverfront Stadium	Recap
5	October 1	**Jacksonville Jaguars**	**L** 16–17	2–3	Astrodome	Recap
6	October 8	at Minnesota Vikings	**L** 17–23 (OT)	2–4	Hubert H. Humphrey Metrodome	Recap
7	Bye					
8	October 22	at Chicago Bears	**L** 32–35	2–5	Soldier Field	Recap
9	October 29	Tampa Bay Buccaneers	**W** 19–7	3–5	Astrodome	Recap
10	November 5	at **Cleveland Browns**	**W** 37–10	4–5	Cleveland Stadium	Recap
11	November 12	**Cincinnati Bengals**	L 25–32	4–6	Astrodome	Recap
12	November 19	at Kansas City Chiefs	**L** 13–20	4–7	Arrowhead Stadium	Recap
13	November 26	Denver Broncos	**W** 42–33	5–7	Astrodome	Recap
14	December 3	at **Pittsburgh Steelers**	**L** 7–21	5–8	Three Rivers Stadium	Recap
15	December 10	Detroit Lions	**L** 17–24	5–9	Astrodome	Recap
16	December 17	New York Jets	**W** 23–6	6–9	Astrodome	Recap
17	December 24	at Buffalo Bills	**W** 28–17	7–9	Rich Stadium	Recap
Note: Intra-division opponents are in **bold** text.

=== Game summaries ===
==== Week 1: at Jacksonville Jaguars ====
Week 1: Houston Oilers at Jacksonville Jaguars

Quarter	1	2	3	4	Total
**Oilers**	7	0	3	0	**10**
Jaguars	0	0	0	3	**3**

at Jacksonville Municipal Stadium, Jacksonville, Florida

- Date: September 3, 1995
- Game time: 3:00 p.m. CST
- Game weather: Overcast, 82 °F (28 °C)
- Game attendance: 72,363
- TV announcers (NBC): Don Criqui and Beasley Reece
- Recap

Game information

**First quarter**

- HOU – Haywood Jeffires 4-yard pass from Chris Chandler (Al Del Greco kick), 6:43. Oilers 7–0. **Drive: 13 plays, 78 yards, 7:17.**

**Second quarter**

- No scoring plays.

**Third quarter**

- HOU – Al Del Greco 19-yard field goal, 5:22. Oilers 10–0. **Drive: 9 plays, 59 yards, 4:41.**

**Fourth quarter**

- JAC – Mike Hollis 26-yard field goal, 11:58. Oilers 10–3. **Drive: 11 plays, 66 yards, 4:32.**

Top passers

- HOU – Chris Chandler – 9/14, 61 yards, TD
- JAC – Steve Beuerlein – 7/17, 54 yards

Top rushers

- HOU – Gary Brown – 29 rushes, 101 yards
- JAC – James Stewart – 10 rushes, 36 yards

Top receivers

- HOU – Derek Russell – 2 receptions, 24 yards
- JAC – Desmond Howard – 3 receptions, 33 yards

=== Standings ===
AFC Central
	W	L	T	PCT	PF	PA	STK
^{(2)} Pittsburgh Steelers	11	5	0	.688	407	327	L1
Cincinnati Bengals	7	9	0	.438	349	374	W1
Houston Oilers	7	9	0	.438	348	324	W2
Cleveland Browns	5	11	0	.313	289	356	L1
Jacksonville Jaguars	4	12	0	.250	275	404	W1
