= Anthony Cook (defensive end) =

American football player (born 1972)

No. 78, 75
- Position: Defensive end

Personal information
- Born: May 30, 1972 (age 54); Bennettsville, South Carolina, U.S.
- Listed height: 6 ft 3 in (1.91 m)
- Listed weight: 295 lb (134 kg)

Career information
- High school: Marlboro (Bennettsville)
- College: South Carolina State
- NFL draft: 1995: 2nd round, 35th overall pick

Career history
- Houston/Tennessee Oilers (1995–1998); Washington Redskins (1999); New York Jets (2000)*
- * Offseason or practice squad member only

Career NFL statistics
- Tackles: 142
- Sacks: 17
- Fumble recoveries: 3
- Stats at Pro Football Reference

Anthony Andrew Cook (born May 30, 1972) is an American former professional football player who was a defensive end in the National Football League (NFL) for the Washington Redskins and the Houston/Tennessee Oilers. He played college football for the South Carolina State Bulldogs under coach Willie Jeffries and was selected in the second round of the 1995 NFL draft.

== NFL career statistics ==
Legend
| **Bold** | Career high |

=== Regular season ===
| Year | Team | Games | | Tackles | | | | | Interceptions | | | | | Fumbles | | | |
| Year | Team | GP | GS | Cmb | Solo | Ast | Sck | TFL | Int | Yds | TD | Lng | PD | FF | FR | Yds | TD |
|---|---|---|---|---|---|---|---|---|---|---|---|---|---|---|---|---|---|
| 1995 | HOU | 10 | 4 | 22 | 15 | 7 | 4.5 | - | 0 | 0 | 0 | 0 | - | 0 | 0 | 0 | 0 |
| 1996 | HOU | 12 | 11 | **44** | **25** | **19** | **7.5** | - | 0 | 0 | 0 | 0 | - | **1** | 0 | 0 | 0 |
| 1997 | TEN | **16** | **16** | 33 | **25** | 8 | 0.0 | - | 0 | 0 | 0 | 0 | - | 0 | **2** | 0 | 0 |
| 1998 | TEN | 13 | 3 | 19 | 15 | 4 | 2.0 | - | 0 | 0 | 0 | 0 | - | 0 | 0 | 0 | 0 |
| 1999 | WAS | **16** | 7 | 24 | 16 | 8 | 3.0 | **5** | 0 | 0 | 0 | 0 | - | 0 | 1 | 0 | 0 |
| | | 67 | 41 | 142 | 96 | 46 | 17.0 | 5 | 0 | 0 | 0 | 0 | - | 1 | 3 | 0 | 0 |

=== Playoffs ===
| Year | Team | Games | | Tackles | | | | | Interceptions | | | | | Fumbles | | | |
| Year | Team | GP | GS | Cmb | Solo | Ast | Sck | TFL | Int | Yds | TD | Lng | PD | FF | FR | Yds | TD |
|---|---|---|---|---|---|---|---|---|---|---|---|---|---|---|---|---|---|
| 1999 | WAS | **2** | **2** | **2** | **1** | **1** | 0.0 | 0 | 0 | 0 | 0 | 0 | 0 | 0 | 0 | 0 | 0 |
| | | 2 | 2 | 2 | 1 | 1 | 0.0 | 0 | 0 | 0 | 0 | 0 | 0 | 0 | 0 | 0 | 0 |
