= Henry Ford (defensive lineman) =

American football player (born 1971)

No. 92
- Positions: Defensive tackle, defensive end

Personal information
- Born: October 30, 1971 (age 55); Fort Worth, Texas, U.S.
- Listed height: 6 ft 3 in (1.91 m)
- Listed weight: 295 lb (134 kg)

Career information
- High school: Fort Worth (TX) Trimble Tech
- College: Arkansas
- NFL draft: 1994: 1st round, 26th overall pick

Career history
- Houston Oilers / Tennessee Oilers / Tennessee Titans (1994–2002); New Orleans Saints (2003)

Awards and highlights
- Third-team All-American (1993); First-team All-SEC (1993)

Career NFL statistics
- Total tackles: 274
- Sacks: 24
- Forced fumbles: 2
- Fumble recoveries: 6
- Passes defended: 5
- Defensive touchdowns: 1
- Stats at Pro Football Reference

Henry Ford (born October 30, 1971, in Fort Worth, Texas) is an American former professional football player who was a defensive tackle in the National Football League (NFL). Ford played most of his career for the Houston Oilers / Tennessee Oilers / Tennessee Titans, and played one year for the New Orleans Saints.

Ford was selected in the first round of the 1994 NFL draft by the Oilers out of the University of Arkansas. In 1999, the Titans made it to Super Bowl XXXIV in which Ford appeared as a substitute, however they lost to the Kurt Warner-led St. Louis Rams.

In high school, Henry Ford played football for Fort Worth (TX) Trimble Tech. Ford played college football on the University of Arkansas football team.

Ford's numbers at Arkansas were impressive. During a career that was split evenly between the SWC and SEC, he racked up 25 sacks and 43 tackles for loss, which rank second and third in UA history, respectively. His best season came in 1993 as a senior, when he set school records for sacks (14) and tackles for loss (23) and became the first Arkansas player to earn first-team All-SEC honors from the AP and coaches. Those marks have since been tied, but still rank first on the single-season lists.

During his 10-year NFL career, Ford started 76 of the 133 games in which he appeared and made 274 tackles, including 24 sacks. He also forced two fumbles and recovered six, including one he returned 30 yards for a touchdown.

== NFL career statistics ==
Legend
	Led the league
**Bold**	Career high

Year	Team	Games		Tackles				Interceptions				Fumbles			
Year	Team	GP	GS	Comb	Solo	Ast	Sck	Int	Yds	TD	Lng	FF	FR	Yds	TD
1994	HOU	11	0	11	10	1	0.0	0	0	0	0	0	0	0	0
1995	HOU	16	16	43	27	**16**	4.5	0	0	0	0	0	0	0	0
1996	HOU	15	14	39	24	15	1.0	0	0	0	0	**2**	0	0	0
1997	TEN	16	16	**50**	**38**	12	5.0	0	0	0	0	0	**2**	13	0
1998	TEN	13	5	22	14	8	1.5	0	0	0	0	0	1	0	0
1999	TEN	12	9	26	15	11	**5.5**	0	0	0	0	0	**2**	0	0
2000	TEN	14	3	32	20	12	2.0	0	0	0	0	0	1	**30**	**1**
2001	TEN	16	0	27	16	11	1.0	0	0	0	0	0	0	0	0
2002	TEN	16	13	22	15	7	3.5	0	0	0	0	0	0	0	0
2003	NOR	4	0	2	2	0	0.0	0	0	0	0	0	0	0	0
Career		133	76	274	181	93	24.0	0	0	0	0	2	6	43	1
