= Al Del Greco =

American football player (born 1962)

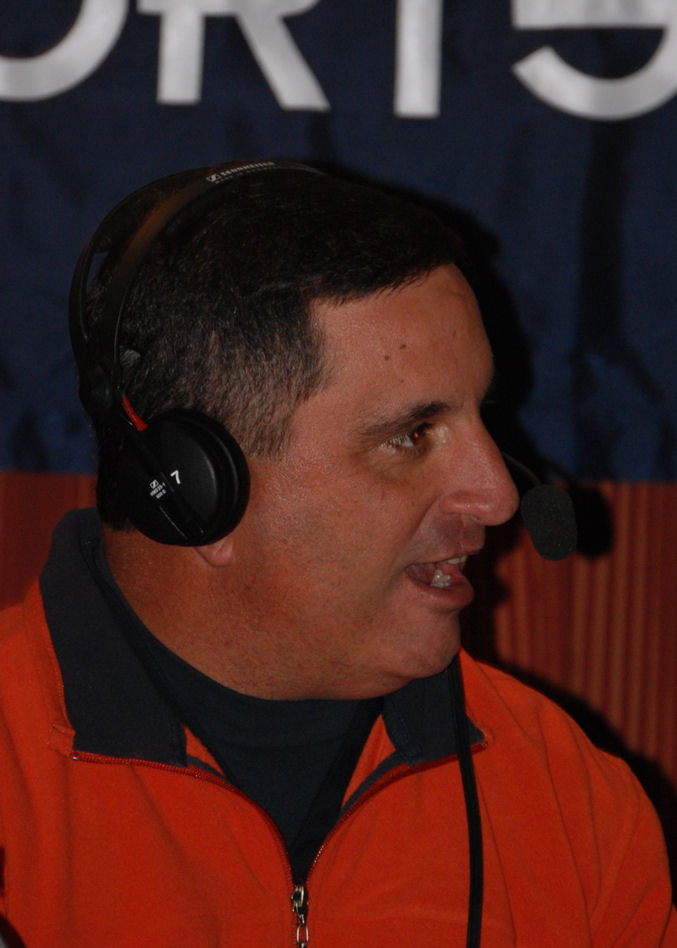
- Del Greco in 2006

No. 10, 17, 3
- Position: Placekicker

Personal information
- Born: March 2, 1962 (age 64); Providence, Rhode Island, U.S.
- Listed height: 5 ft 10 in (1.78 m)
- Listed weight: 200 lb (91 kg)

Career information
- High school: Coral Gables Senior (Coral Gables, Florida)
- College: Auburn
- NFL draft: 1984: undrafted

Career history
- Miami Dolphins (1984)*; Green Bay Packers (1984–1987); St. Louis/Phoenix Cardinals (1987–1990); Houston / Tennessee Oilers / Titans (1991–2000)
- * Offseason or practice squad member only

Career NFL statistics
- Field goals: 347 / 449 (.773)
- Extra points: 543 / 551 (.985)
- Points scored: 1,584
- Stats at Pro Football Reference

Albert Louis Del Greco (born March 2, 1962) is an American former professional football placekicker and a current sports radio personality. After eight years as golf coach at Spain Park High School in Hoover, Alabama, Del Greco was named the head coach of the men's golf team at Samford University on May 2, 2014.

== Early life ==
Albert Louis Del Greco was born on March 2, 1962, in Providence, Rhode Island, U.S. He attended Coral Gables Senior High School in Coral Gables, Florida.

== College career ==
A four-year letterman at Auburn, Del Greco completed 110 out of 111 PATs in his college career. He also set the SEC record for field goal attempts in a single game and field goals made in a single game in a 1982 game versus Kentucky where he made six out of his seven attempts. As of 2016, He and Daniel Carlson are tied for the most field goals in a single game for Auburn at 6. His 236 career points place him fifth on the Auburn career scoring list.

== Professional career ==
Del Greco was the starting placekicker in Super Bowl XXXIV for the Tennessee Titans, which his team lost 23–16. In the game, he made one field goal, which tied the game 16–16. In the 3rd quarter of said Super Bowl, Del Greco missed a crucial field goal that would’ve tied the game. Del Greco finished his 17 NFL seasons with 347 of 449 (77%) field goals and 551 of 554 (99.46%) extra points, giving him a total of 1,592 points. As of September 16, 2024, he's ranked 24th on the NFL's list of all-time leading scorers. He was inducted in the Alabama Hall of Fame.

== Post-playing career ==
At Spain Park High School in Hoover, Alabama, Del Greco was the boys golf coach and the football team's kicking coach. His son, Trey was the football team's place kicker prior to graduating after the 2007 season. Trey went on to play golf on an athletic scholarship at Vanderbilt University. In 2003, Del Greco became Birmingham Steeldogs' kickers coach.

He co-hosted "The Opening Drive" on WJOX in Birmingham, Alabama, with Jay Barker and Tony Kurre. The program ended in early 2018.

Del Greco became the head men's golf coach at Samford University in 2014, a position he has held ever since. In 12 years under Del Greco, Samford has found success, including top-five finishes in the 2016 Folino Classic and 2024 Big Blue Intercollegiate.

== Career regular season statistics ==
Career high/best bolded

Regular season statistics
| Season | Team (record) | G | FGM | FGA | % | <20 | 20-29 | 30-39 | 40-49 | 50+ | LNG | BLK | XPM | XPA | % | PTS |
|---|---|---|---|---|---|---|---|---|---|---|---|---|---|---|---|---|
| 1984 | GB (8–8) | 9 | 9 | 12 | 75.0 | 0–0 | 2–2 | 3–4 | 4–5 | 0–1 | 45 | 0 | 34 | 34 | **100.0** | 61 |
| 1985 | GB (8–8) | **16** | 19 | 26 | 73.1 | 0–0 | 10–12 | 4–4 | 5–9 | 0–1 | 46 | 0 | 38 | 40 | 95.0 | 95 |
| 1986 | GB (4–12) | **16** | 17 | 27 | 63.0 | 0–0 | 8–8 | 4–6 | 3–9 | 2–4 | 50 | 0 | 29 | 29 | **100.0** | 80 |
| 1987 | GB (5–9–1) | 5 | 5 | 10 | 50.0 | 0–0 | 1–2 | 2–4 | 2–4 | 0–0 | 47 | 0 | 11 | 11 | **100.0** | 26 |
| 1987 | SLC (7–8) | 3 | 4 | 5 | 80.0 | 0–0 | 2–3 | 2–2 | 0–0 | 0–0 | 37 | 0 | 8 | 9 | 88.9 | 20 |
| 1988 | PHO (7–9) | **16** | 12 | 21 | 57.1 | 1–1 | 4–6 | 3–3 | 3–9 | 1–2 | 51 | 0 | 42 | **44** | 95.5 | 78 |
| 1989 | PHO (5–11) | **16** | 18 | 26 | 69.2 | 0–0 | 7–7 | 5–6 | 5–11 | 1–2 | 50 | 0 | 28 | 29 | 96.6 | 82 |
| 1990 | PHO (5–11) | **16** | 17 | 27 | 63.0 | 1–1 | 4–4 | 7–10 | 3–6 | 2–6 | 50 | 0 | 31 | 31 | **100.0** | 82 |
| 1991 | HOU (11–5) | 7 | 10 | 13 | 76.9 | 1–1 | 4–5 | 2–3 | 2–3 | 1–1 | 52 | 0 | 16 | 16 | **100.0** | 46 |
| 1992 | HOU (10–6) | **16** | 21 | 27 | 77.8 | **3–3** | 8–9 | 5–6 | 4–8 | 1–1 | 54 | 0 | 41 | 41 | **100.0** | 104 |
| 1993 | HOU (12-4) | **16** | 29 | 34 | 85.3 | 0–0 | **13–13** | 8–9 | 4–5 | **4–7** | 52 | 0 | 39 | 40 | 95.5 | 126 |
| 1994 | HOU (2-14) | **16** | 16 | 20 | 80.0 | 0–0 | 4–5 | 4–4 | 7–8 | 1–3 | 50 | 0 | 18 | 18 | **100.0** | 66 |
| 1995 | HOU (7–9) | **16** | 27 | 31 | 87.1 | **3–3** | 3–3 | 8–8 | 10–12 | 3–5 | 53 | 0 | 33 | 33 | **100.0** | 114 |
| 1996 | HOU (8–8) | **16** | 32 | 38 | 84.2 | 0–0 | 7–7 | 14–16 | 10–12 | 1–3 | **56** | **1** | 35 | 35 | **100.0** | 131 |
| 1997 | TEN (8–8) | **16** | 27 | 35 | 77.1 | 2–2 | 6–6 | 10–11 | 7–14 | 2–2 | 52 | 0 | 32 | 32 | **100.0** | 113 |
| 1998 | TEN (8-8) | **16** | **36** | **39** | **92.3** | 1–1 | 8–8 | **15–15** | **12–15** | 0–0 | 48 | 0 | 28 | 28 | **100.0** | **136** |
| 1999 | TEN (13–3) | **16** | 21 | 25 | 84.0 | 1–1 | 8–8 | 7–9 | 4–6 | 1–1 | 50 | 0 | **43** | 43 | **100.0** | 106 |
| 2000 | TEN (13–3) | **16** | 27 | 33 | 81.8 | 0–0 | 13–15 | 7–8 | 6–9 | 1–1 | 50 | 0 | 37 | 38 | 97.4 | 118 |
| Career (17 seasons) | | 248 | 347 | 449 | 77.3 | 13–13 | 112–123 | 110–128 | 91–145 | 21–40 | 56 | 1 | 543 | 551 | 98.5 | 1584 |

=== Oilers/Titans franchise records ===
- Most all-time field goals made (246)
- Most all-time extra points made (322)
- Most all-time points scored (1,060)

== Celebrity golf ==
Del Greco has competed at the American Century Championship, an annual competition to determine the best golfers among American sports and entertainment celebrities. He won the tournament in 1998 and has a total of ten top ten finishes. It was in 2000 when Del Greco's 7 under par 65, gave him the 2000 trophy. The tournament, televised by NBC in July, is played at Edgewood Tahoe Golf Course in Lake Tahoe, Nevada.
