= Derek Russell =

American football player (born 1969)

No. 85
- Position: Wide receiver

Personal information
- Born: July 22, 1969 (age 57); Little Rock, Arkansas, U.S.
- Listed height: 6 ft 0 in (1.83 m)
- Listed weight: 195 lb (88 kg)

Career information
- High school: Little Rock Central
- College: Arkansas
- NFL draft: 1991: 4th round, 89th overall pick

Career history
- Denver Broncos (1991–1994); Houston/Tennessee Oilers (1995–1997)

Career NFL statistics
- Receptions: 172
- Receiving yards: 2,401
- Receiving touchdowns: 8
- Stats at Pro Football Reference

Derek Russell (born July 22, 1969) is an American former professional football player who was a wide receiver for seven seasons in the National Football League (NFL) with the Denver Broncos and the Houston, then Tennessee, Oilers. He played college football for the Arkansas Razorbacks and was selected in the fourth round of the 1991 NFL draft by the Broncos.

In his four years at Arkansas, he helped the Razorbacks win two Southwest Conference championships in 1988 and 1989, and was the option running team's big play deep threat in the passing game. His senior year at Little Rock Central High, he led the Tigers to a state title. His most productive season in the NFL came in 1993 with the Broncos when he caught 44 passes for 719 yards and 3 TDs in thirteen games with twelve starts.

Russell also ran the high hurdles for the powerhouse Razorback track team, helping them win five NCAA Indoor Track & Field national championships.

== NFL career statistics ==
Legend
**Bold**	Career high

=== Regular season ===
Year	Team	Games		Receiving				
Year	Team	GP	GS	Rec	Yds	Avg	Lng	TD
1991	DEN	13	5	21	317	15.1	40	1
1992	DEN	12	6	12	140	11.7	22	0
1993	DEN	13	**12**	**44**	**719**	**16.3**	43	**3**
1994	DEN	12	**12**	25	342	13.7	43	1
1995	HOU	11	5	24	321	13.4	**57**	0
1996	HOU	**16**	5	34	421	12.4	29	2
1997	TEN	11	2	12	141	11.8	23	1
Career		88	47	172	2,401	14.0	57	8

=== Playoffs ===
Year	Team	Games		Receiving				
Year	Team	GP	GS	Rec	Yds	Avg	Lng	TD
1991	DEN	**2**	**2**	1	20	**20.0**	20	0
1993	DEN	1	0	**2**	**31**	15.5	**25**	**1**
Career		3	2	3	51	17.0	25	1
