= Barron Wortham =

American football player (born 1969)

No. 52, 57
- Position: Linebacker

Personal information
- Born: November 1, 1969 (age 57); Fort Worth, Texas, U.S.
- Listed height: 5 ft 11 in (1.80 m)
- Listed weight: 244 lb (111 kg)

Career information
- High school: Everman (Everman, Texas)
- College: UTEP
- NFL draft: 1994: 6th round, 194th overall pick

Career history
- Houston Oilers / Tennessee Oilers / Tennessee Titans (1994–1999); Dallas Cowboys (2000)

Awards and highlights
- First-team All-American (1993); WAC Defensive Player of the Year (1993); 3× All-WAC (1991, 1992, 1993); WAC Freshman of the Year (1990)

Career NFL statistics
- Tackles: 365
- Sacks: 3.5
- Interceptions: 2
- Stats at Pro Football Reference

Barron Winfred Wortham (born November 1, 1969) is an American former professional football player who was a linebacker in the National Football League (NFL) for the Houston Oilers / Tennessee Oilers / Tennessee Titans and Dallas Cowboys. He played college football for the UTEP Miners.

== Early life ==
Born in Fort Worth, Texas, Wortham attended Everman High School, where he practiced football and track. He accepted a football scholarship from the University of Texas-El Paso. Although he entered spring practices with a leg injury he suffered at an All-Star high school game, he was able to earn the starter position at middle linebacker, leading the team with 129 tackles and a career-high 6 sacks.

As a sophomore, he posted 148 tackles, 4 sacks and 4 fumble recoveries. As a junior, he had 138 tackles and 2 sacks. He had 16 tackles and one blocked punt against the University of Tulsa.

As a senior his team only won one game, but he registered 151 tackles (breaking the conference's career record) and was named the Western Athletic Conference defensive player of the year. He tallied 26 tackles, one forced fumble and one interceptions against the UNLV.

He left as the school's All-time leader in career tackles (566) and tackles for loss (43), 12 sacks, 4 interceptions, 12 passes defensed, 6 fumble recoveries and 4 forced fumbles. He also matched Raymond Morris as the only players in school history to lead the team in tackles four times.

In 2014, he was named to the University of Texas-El Paso Centennial football team. In 2018, he was inducted into the UTEP Athletic Hall of Fame.

== Professional career ==
=== Houston Oilers / Tennessee Oilers / Tennessee Titans ===
Wortham was selected by the Houston Oilers in the sixth round (194th overall) of the 1994 NFL draft. As a rookie, he was a backup linebacker, playing on special teams and as a short-yardage blocking fullback. In the season finale against the New York Jets, he suffered a torn left anterior cruciate ligament. He collected 22 defensive tackles, 11 special teams tackles (second on the team) and one fumble recovery.

In 1995, he started 5 out of 16 games, replacing the injured Micheal Barrow and Al Smith. He registered 38 tackles, one sack, one forced fumble and 10 special teams tackles. He also received the Ed Block Courage Award after recovering from his previous injury.

In 1996, he became the starter at middle linebacker after Smith suffered a season-ending quadriceps injury in the first game against the Kansas City Chiefs. He posted 78 tackles (fourth on the team), 2 sacks, 4 passes defensed, 2 fumble recoveries and 3 special teams tackles.

In 1997, he started 16 games at middle linebacker, making 97 tackles (led the team), one pass defensed and one forced fumble. In 1998, Joe Bowden took over his role and Wortham finished with 9 defensive tackles and 8 special teams tackles.

In 1999, he was named the starter in a season that saw the Titans reach Super Bowl XXXIV, while registering 81 tackles, 0.5 sacks, 5 tackles for loss, 2 quarterback pressures, 3 fumble recoveries and 7 special teams tackles.

Following the signing of Randall Godfrey in free agency and the drafting of Keith Bullock, Wortham became expendable and was released on April 26, 2000. He left after starting 51 out of 92 regular-season games.

=== Dallas Cowboys ===
In 2000, the Dallas Cowboys had a lot of turnover at the linebacker position and one of the moves made to improve the depth was the signing of Wortham in free agency on May 4. He was limited during the preseason, after undergoing arthroscopic surgery to repair cartilage damage in his left knee in the second week of training camp.

Dat Nguyen suffered a left knee sprain in the second contest of the season and Wortham replaced him at middle linebacker. He went on to start 11 games, finishing with 92 tackles (fifth on the team), 6 tackles for loss, one quarterback pressure, one pass defensed and a career-high 2 interceptions. He wasn't re-signed at the end of the season.

== NFL career statistics ==
Legend
**Bold**	Career high

=== Regular season ===
Year	Team	Games		Tackles				Interceptions				Fumbles			
Year	Team	GP	GS	Comb	Solo	Ast	Sck	Int	Yds	TD	Lng	FF	FR	Yds	TD
1994	HOU	16	1	22	15	7	0.0	0	0	0	0	0	1	0	0
1995	HOU	16	5	38	23	15	1.0	0	0	0	0	1	0	0	0
1996	HOU	15	14	78	49	29	**2.0**	0	0	0	0	1	2	0	0
1997	TEN	16	16	**97**	**61**	**36**	0.0	0	0	0	0	1	0	0	0
1998	TEN	13	0	4	4	0	0.0	0	0	0	0	0	0	0	0
1999	TEN	16	15	61	47	14	0.5	0	0	0	0	1	**3**	**8**	0
2000	DAL	16	11	65	55	10	0.0	**2**	**1**	0	**1**	**2**	1	0	0
		108	62	365	254	111	3.5	2	1	0	1	6	7	8	0

=== Playoffs ===
Year	Team	Games		Tackles				Interceptions				Fumbles			
Year	Team	GP	GS	Comb	Solo	Ast	Sck	Int	Yds	TD	Lng	FF	FR	Yds	TD
1999	TEN	4	4	12	10	2	0.0	0	0	0	0	0	1	0	0
		4	4	12	10	2	0.0	0	0	0	0	0	1	0	0

== Personal life ==
After his playing career, he founded the Barron Wortham Football Academy. His son, Barron Wortham Jr., also played football at UTEP, following in his father's footsteps as a linebacker. Wortham Jr. played in a total of 14 games and majored in graphic design during his time at UTEP.
