= Chris Chandler (American football) =

American football player (born 1965)

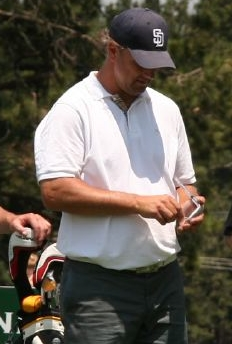
- Chandler in 2008

No. 12, 17
- Position: Quarterback

Personal information
- Born: October 12, 1965 (age 61); Everett, Washington, U.S.
- Listed height: 6 ft 4 in (1.93 m)
- Listed weight: 224 lb (102 kg)

Career information
- High school: Everett
- College: Washington (1984–1987)
- NFL draft: 1988: 3rd round, 76th overall pick

Career history
- Indianapolis Colts (1988–1989); Tampa Bay Buccaneers (1990–1991); Phoenix Cardinals (1991–1993); Los Angeles Rams (1994); Houston Oilers (1995–1996); Atlanta Falcons (1997–2001); Chicago Bears (2002–2003); St. Louis Rams (2004)

Awards and highlights
- 2× Pro Bowl (1997, 1998); PFWA All-Rookie Team (1988)

Career NFL statistics
- Passing attempts: 4,005
- Passing completions: 2,328
- Completion percentage: 58.1%
- TD–INT: 170–146
- Passing yards: 28,484
- Passer rating: 79.1
- Stats at Pro Football Reference

Christopher Mark Chandler (born October 12, 1965) is an American former professional football player who was a quarterback in the National Football League (NFL) for 17 seasons. He played college football for the Washington Huskies. Chandler played for seven teams in eight cities during his NFL career, and is known for leading the Atlanta Falcons to a 14–2 season in 1998 with an appearance in Super Bowl XXXIII.

== Early life ==
Chandler was born on October 12, 1965, in Everett, Washington, the ninth of ten children. His mother died when he was 19, and his father died shortly after he made it to the NFL. In high school, he was active in basketball, football, track and golf. As a high school quarterback, Chandler threw for 2,000 yards and 49 touchdowns.

== College career ==
In college, Chandler played at the University of Washington from 1984 to 1987. He finished third in the school's history in total offense with 4,442 yards and 32 touchdown passes, and ended his college career as the Offensive Player of the Game at the 1988 Senior Bowl. He graduated with an economics degree and was a member of Phi Gamma Delta fraternity.

== Professional career ==
Pre-draft measurables
Height	Weight	Hand span	40-yard dash	10-yard split	20-yard split	20-yard shuttle	Vertical jump	Broad jump	Bench press
6 ft 3 7/8 in (1.93 m)	211 lb (96 kg)	9 1/4 in (0.23 m)	4.87 s	1.69 s	2.81 s	4.40 s	3.0 in (0.08 m)	8 ft 6 in (2.59 m)	10 reps

Chandler played in the NFL for 17 seasons, from 1988 to 2004. He played for eight teams (seven franchises as he played for Los Angeles Rams in their original city and later when they relocated to St. Louis), a record shared with Ryan Fitzpatrick, Mark Royals, Karl Wilson, and Jeff Brady, although Chandler and Fitzpatrick are the only two to have started for eight teams. He threw for 28,484 yards, and had a career passer rating of 79.1. He has thrown at least one touchdown pass for seven franchises, an NFL record before it was broken by Fitzpatrick in 2019. At the time of his retirement, he was ranked 30th in all-time pass completions, with 2328.

Chandler was continually bothered by injuries which earned him the moniker of "Crystal Chandelier" amongst his detractors. He also had the misfortune of "always [being] the guy preceding the next great draft choice" which made his career somewhat of a journeyman's.

=== 1988–1996 ===
Chandler was taken in the third round of the 1988 NFL Draft by the Indianapolis Colts, who added him to a roster with Jack Trudeau and Gary Hogeboom as the quarterback room. Chandler made spot appearances in two of the first three games of the season before being tapped to start Week 4 against the Miami Dolphins. He went 10-of-18 for 110 yards with an interception but the Colts won 15-13. Chandler started the remaining twelve games of the regular season, with the Colts going 9-4; Chandler threw for 1,619 yards with eight touchdowns and twelve interceptions and a 67.2 passer rating while having just one game with more than 200 yards. Chander started the first three games of the 1989 season but did not play a single snap afterwards due to a knee injury suffered against Atlanta that knocked him out for the year; he threw two touchdowns to three interceptions on 537 passing yards combined for a 1-2 start. The Colts deemed Chandler expendable due to his poor play, and the fact that they selected Jeff George with the first overall choice in the 1990 draft. Chandler was traded to the Tampa Bay Buccaneers in 1990 for a 1st round draft choice that turned out to be the 2nd overall pick. The Colts also had the 1st pick the same year. The pick that they got for Chandler they used on Quentin Coryatt. Chandler was cut during the 1991 season. As a Buccaneer, he had an 0–6 record as a starter, threw for 5 touchdowns and 14 interceptions, and had a passer rating of 44.9.

From 1992 to 1994 he played reasonably well as a starter and backup for the Phoenix Cardinals and the Los Angeles Rams. After joining the Houston Oilers in 1995, he would earn the starting job. His highlight with the team came on September 24, 1995, at Cincinnati. In the Oilers' 38–28 victory Chandler threw for 352 yards and 4 touchdowns, and earned a perfect passer rating of 158.3 after completing 23 of 26 passes. However, late in 1996, Jeff Fisher decided that Steve McNair was ready to start, and Chandler was traded to the Atlanta Falcons for a fourth-round draft choice.

=== 1997–2001 ===
Chandler's best seasons were with Atlanta, when he was coached by Dan Reeves. The Falcons' financial constraints meant that they could not sign an expensive big-name quarterback from free agency. Chandler was a Pro Bowl quarterback in 1997 and 1998. Reeves said Chandler "makes decisions while backpedaling that other QBs can't make until they settle into the pocket" while other "Coaches say he can speed-read defenses and anticipate his receivers well". In 1998, Chandler's 9.65 yards-per-attempt figure was the highest single-season YPA of any quarterback in the 1990s with 300+ passing attempts, while he set career-bests in yardage and touchdowns and threw just 12 interceptions. The 1998 season saw Chandler lead the Falcons to a 14–2 record, winning their first playoff game in the Georgia Dome by overcoming the San Francisco 49ers and Steve Young 20–18 in the divisional round, and then capturing the NFC Championship conference title by upsetting the 15–1 Minnesota Vikings to make their inaugural appearance in the Super Bowl. In Super Bowl XXXIII, Chandler's Falcons lost to the defending champions Denver Broncos quarterbacked by John Elway and coached by Mike Shanahan. Although Chandler had a higher passing efficiency rating that season than future Hall-of-Famer Elway, Chandler put in a disappointing performance in the Super Bowl with 219 yards with one touchdown and three interceptions while being sacked three times.

Chandler signed a five-year, $27 million contract with the Falcons after the Super Bowl. Following the 2000 season, Chandler's record as a starting Atlanta quarterback was 28–25, which prompted the Falcons to consider recruiting a new quarterback. Atlanta held the fifth overall pick in the 2001 draft, and traded the pick to the San Diego Chargers, along with Tim Dwight, a third round pick in 2001, and a 2002 second round pick (which became Reche Caldwell). In return, Atlanta received the first overall pick in the 2001 draft, which they used to select quarterback Michael Vick. Still, Chandler started most of the 2001 season and finished with 2,847 passing yards, the second highest of his career. In 2002, he was replaced by Vick as the starting quarterback. Due to mediocre play, bloated salary, and being replaced by Vick, the Falcons opted to make Chandler eligible for selection by the Houston Texans in the 2002 Expansion Draft, with hopes of Chandler being picked up by the new team. Chandler left the Falcons ranked third in team history with 13,268 passing yards, but never achieved back-to-back winning seasons.

=== 2002–2004 ===
In 2002, Chandler was picked up by the Chicago Bears, and spent two seasons there before being released.

Chandler then agreed to a three-year, $2.6 million contract to rejoin the Rams, to serve as a backup and mentor to Marc Bulger, who had recently displaced Kurt Warner as the starting quarterback. In Chandler's first start as a Ram in 2004, he threw six interceptions, a team record. The following week, his poor play led to head coach Mike Martz saying, "It is tragic that, that position [when played by Chandler] holds this team hostage." As a result, Chandler was the first Ram to be released in the off-season, saving St. Louis $665,000 in cap space.

== Career statistics ==
=== NFL ===
Legend
	Led the league
**Bold**	Career high

==== Regular season ====
Year	Team	Games			Passing								Rushing				Sacks		Fumbles	
Year	Team	GP	GS	Record	Cmp	Att	Pct	Yds	Avg	TD	Int	Rtg	Att	Yds	Avg	TD	Sck	SckY	Fum	Lost
1988	IND	**15**	13	9–4	129	233	55.4	1,619	6.9	8	12	67.2	**46**	139	3.0	**3**	18	128	0	0
1989	IND	3	3	1–2	39	80	48.8	537	6.7	2	3	63.4	7	57	**8.1**	1	3	17	0	0
1990	TB	7	3	0–3	42	83	50.6	464	5.6	1	6	41.4	13	71	5.5	1	15	103	0	0
1991	TB	6	3	0–3	53	104	51.0	557	5.4	4	8	47.6	18	79	4.4	0	10	76	0	0
1991	PHX	3	2	0–2	25	50	50.0	289	5.8	1	2	57.8	8	32	4.0	0	7	58	6	0
1992	PHX	**15**	13	4–9	**245**	**413**	59.3	2,832	6.9	15	**15**	77.1	36	149	4.1	1	29	226	9	**5**
1993	PHX	4	2	1–1	52	103	50.5	471	4.6	3	2	64.8	3	2	0.7	0	4	25	2	2
1994	LAR	12	6	2–4	108	176	61.4	1,352	7.7	7	2	93.7	18	61	3.4	1	7	46	3	2
1995	HOU	13	13	5–8	225	356	**63.2**	2,460	6.9	17	10	87.8	28	58	2.1	2	21	173	**12**	**5**
1996	HOU	12	12	6–6	184	320	57.5	2,099	6.6	16	11	79.7	28	113	4.0	0	25	153	8	3
1997	ATL	14	**14**	7–7	202	342	59.1	2,692	7.9	20	7	95.1	43	**158**	3.7	0	39	261	9	4
1998	ATL	14	**14**	**13–1**	190	327	58.1	**3,154**	**9.6**	**25**	12	**100.9**	36	121	3.4	2	**45**	**283**	6	2
1999	ATL	12	12	4–8	174	307	56.7	2,339	7.6	16	11	83.5	16	57	3.6	1	32	230	7	2
2000	ATL	14	13	4–9	192	331	58.0	2,236	5.7	10	12	73.5	21	60	2.9	0	40	251	7	1
2001	ATL	14	**14**	6–8	223	365	61.1	2,847	7.8	16	14	84.1	25	84	3.4	0	41	261	8	1
2002	CHI	9	7	2–5	103	161	64.0	1,023	5.7	4	4	79.8	10	32	3.2	0	23	144	3	3
2003	CHI	8	6	3–3	107	192	55.7	1,050	5.5	3	7	61.3	14	35	2.5	0	14	101	4	0
2004	STL	5	2	0–2	35	62	56.5	463	7.5	2	8	51.4	1	2	2.0	0	7	54	1	1
Career		180	152	67–85	2,328	4,005	58.1	28,484	7.1	170	146	79.1	371	1,310	3.5	12	380	2,590	85	31

==== Postseason ====
Year	Team	Games			Passing								Rushing				Sacks	
Year	Team	GP	GS	Record	Cmp	Att	Pct	Yds	Avg	TD	Int	Rtg	Att	Yds	Avg	TD	Sck	SckY
1998	ATL	3	3	2–1	59	97	60.8	728	7.5	4	4	80.6	9	52	5.8	0	7	52
Career		3	3	2–1	59	97	60.8	728	7.5	4	4	80.6	9	52	5.8	0	7	52

=== College ===
Season	Team	Passing						
Season	Team	Cmp	Att	Pct	Yds	TD	Int	Rtg
1986	Washington	180	318	56.6	2,193	20	15	125.9
1987	Washington	143	279	51.3	1,973	11	14	113.6
Career		323	597	54.1	4,166	31	29	120.1

== Personal life ==
Chandler lived in San Diego and was married to Diane Brodie, a former college tennis player at USC and daughter of former San Francisco 49ers quarterback John Brodie; they married in 1994. They have three daughters: Ryann, Skye, and Brynn. As Chandler's mother Shirley died of breast cancer in 1984, and his father Forrest succumbed to lung cancer in 1991, Chandler has looked upon John Brodie and Jerry Rhome (who served as Chandler's quarterback coach in Arizona and Houston) as surrogate fathers and mentors.

Chandler is a regular competitor at the American Century Championship, the annual competition to determine the best golfers among American sports and entertainment celebrities. He won the tournament in 2007 and has a total of eight top ten finishes. Chris Chandler fired a 5 under par round of 67 scoring a total of 31 points. The veteran QB set both single day and tournament records for points with his final round play. The tournament, televised by NBC in July, is played at Edgewood Tahoe Golf Course in Lake Tahoe. Chandler helped coach the boys' golf team at Torrey Pines High School, where his oldest daughter Ryann plays on the volleyball team.

== See also ==
- List of NFL quarterbacks who have posted a perfect passer rating
- Washington Huskies football statistical leaders
