= Chris Sanders (wide receiver) =

American football player (born 1972)

No. 81
- Position: Wide receiver

Personal information
- Born: May 8, 1972 (age 54); Denver, Colorado, U.S.
- Listed height: 6 ft 4 in (1.93 m)
- Listed weight: 210 lb (95 kg)

Career information
- High school: Montbello (Denver)
- College: Ohio State
- NFL draft: 1995: 3rd round, 67th overall pick

Career history
- Houston/Tennessee Oilers/Titans (1995–2002); Cleveland Browns (2002)*
- * Offseason or practice squad member only

Awards and highlights
- PFWA All-Rookie Team (1995)

Career NFL statistics
- Receptions: 177
- Receiving yards: 3,285
- Receiving touchdowns: 17
- Stats at Pro Football Reference

Christopher Dwayne Sanders (born May 8, 1972) is an American former professional football player who was a wide receiver for seven seasons in the National Football League (NFL) for the Houston/Tennessee Oilers/Titans. He attended Montbello High School in Denver, Colorado and was a multi-sport athlete at Ohio State University. Sanders, however, holds the dubious NFL record for the fewest career rushing yards. He rushed 4 times in his career - all for negative yards.

== Ohio State ==
Sanders was a member of the Ohio State Buckeyes track and field team from 1992 to 1994. On February 15, 1992 he set the school record in the indoor long jump (26'9.75"). That record still stands. He was also a member of two relay teams (4x100 and 4x200) that also set Ohio State records.

On the Ohio State football team Sanders was a three-year starter at the flanker position. He had 71 career receptions for 1,120 total yards, and was such a strong team contributor that for two years he kept future Biletnikoff-winner Terry Glenn on the second team.

Sanders was named the Ohio State Athlete of the Year, across all sports, in 1994.

== Houston Oilers/Tennessee Titans ==
Sanders was selected by the Houston Oilers in the third round of the 1995 NFL draft. He stayed with the team for seven years, recording 177 career receptions for 3,285 total yards. He also holds the record for fewest career rushing yards since the AFL/NFL merger with -36. In 1999, the Titans made it to Super Bowl XXXIV in which Sanders appeared as a substitute, however they lost to the Kurt Warner-led St. Louis Rams.

== NFL career statistics ==
Legend
	Led the league
**Bold**	Career high

=== Regular season ===
Year	Team	Games		Receiving					
Year	Team	GP	GS	Tgt	Rec	Yds	Avg	Lng	TD
1995	HOU	**16**	11	87	35	823	23.5	76	**9**
1996	HOU	**16**	**15**	**105**	**48**	**882**	18.4	**83**	4
1997	TEN	15	14	64	31	498	16.1	55	3
1998	TEN	14	1	20	5	136	**27.2**	46	0
1999	TEN	**16**	0	48	20	336	16.8	48	1
2000	TEN	**16**	14	61	33	536	16.2	54	0
2001	TEN	4	0	18	5	74	14.8	22	0
		97	55	403	177	3,285	18.6	83	17

=== Playoffs ===
Year	Team	Games		Receiving					
Year	Team	GP	GS	Tgt	Rec	Yds	Avg	Lng	TD
1999	TEN	**4**	0	**7**	**3**	**49**	**16.3**	**26**	0
2000	TEN	1	**1**	3	0	0	0.0	0	0
		5	1	10	3	49	16.3	26	0

== Coaching career ==
In 2005, Sanders began coaching at Christ Presbyterian Academy (CPA), a private K-12 school located in Nashville, TN. While at CPA he worked as an assistant coach in both football and track. During the summer of 2008, he left CPA and began coaching the wide receivers position and the track team at Montgomery Bell Academy (MBA), an all-male private school also located in Nashville.

== Personal ==
- Sanders was known by the nickname "Tippy Toes" as a college player for his graceful gait.
- The elder of Sanders' 2 sons, C.J., is a child actor best known for his role as the young Ray Charles in the movie Ray. In 2014, C.J. committed to play football at the University of Notre Dame as a wide receiver.

Preceded by Chris Nelloms	Ohio State Athlete of the Year; 1994	Succeeded by Blaine Wilson
