= Kendrick Burton =

American football player (born 1973)

No. 94
- Position: Defensive end

Personal information
- Born: September 7, 1973 (age 53); Decatur, Alabama, U.S.
- Listed height: 6 ft 5 in (1.96 m)
- Listed weight: 288 lb (131 kg)

Career information
- High school: Hartselle (AL)
- College: Alabama
- NFL draft: 1996: 4th round, 107th overall pick

Career history
- Houston Oilers (1996–1997); Barcelona Dragons (1999); Seattle Seahawks (2000)*; Birmingham Thunderbolts (2001)
- * Offseason or practice squad member only

Career NFL statistics
- Tackles: 1
- Fumble recoveries: 1
- Stats at Pro Football Reference

Kendrick Duran Burton (born September 7, 1973) is an American former professional football player who was a defensive lineman for the Houston Oilers of the National Football League (NFL). He played college football for the Alabama Crimson Tide and was selected 107th overall in the fourth round of the 1996 NFL draft by the Oilers.

A native of Decatur, Alabama, Burton was an All-American selection at Hartselle High School.

As a senior at Alabama, Burton was close friends with Shaun Alexander.
