= Hartselle City School District =

School district in Alabama, United States

Hartselle City Schools

Location
- Hartselle, Alabama, 35640; United States
- Coordinates: 34°26′49″N 86°55′52″W

District information
- Grades: K-12
- Superintendent: Brian Clayton
- Asst. superintendent(s): Nancy Horton
- NCES District ID: 0101730

Students and staff
- Students: 3,469
- Teachers: 210.22
- Student–teacher ratio: 16.50
- District mascot: Tigers
- Colors: Cardinal and white

Other information
- Website: www.hartselletigers.org

Hartselle City Schools is a school district, established in 1975, serving the student populations of Hartselle, Alabama, and portions of Morgan County, Alabama.

The district serves more than 3,100 students with three elementary schools (Barkley Bridge Elementary, Crestline Elementary, and F.E. Burleson Elementary) serving kindergarten through the fourth grade, an intermediate school (Hartselle Intermediate High School) for fifth and sixth graders, a junior high school (Hartselle Junior High School) and Hartselle High School (formerly Morgan County High School) for ninth through twelfth grades. On April 1, 2013, the high school relocated to a new 50-acre campus at 1000 Bethel Road.

Barkley Bridge Elementary School was named a National Blue Ribbon School by the National Blue Ribbon Schools Program in 2011. Blue Ribbon Schools of Excellence have designated Hartselle High, Crestline Elementary, F.E. Burleson Elementary and Barkley Bridge Elementary as Blue Ribbon Lighthouse Schools. F.E. Burleson Elementary School was named a national Green Ribbon School by the United States Department of Education. One hundred fifty-three geothermal wells at F.E. Burleson Elementary provide energy to heat and cool the school.

Hartselle has won numerous state championships in athletics. The baseball program has won eight Alabama High School Athletic Association state championships, which is tied for No. 4 overall. The softball program is the reigning 2014 Class 5A state champions and is tied for fifth overall with four state championships. Hartselle has also won four state championships in girls golf with Arin Eddy winning two individual titles and Heather Nail winning one individual title. Led by Vickie Orr, the high school has two girls basketball championships in 1984 and 1985. The wrestling program has won two team state championships. Hartselle football, girls basketball and volleyball have one state championship each. Sissy McClung is the only individual state champion in girls tennis.

== See also ==
- Morgan County Schools (Alabama)
