= Armon Williams =

American football player (born 1973)

No. 42, 46
- Position: Defensive back

Personal information
- Born: August 13, 1973 (age 53); Chandler, Arizona, U.S.
- Listed height: 6 ft 1 in (1.85 m)
- Listed weight: 221 lb (100 kg)

Career information
- High school: Valley Christian (Chandler)
- College: Arizona
- NFL draft: 1997: 7th round, 216th overall pick

Career history
- Tennessee Oilers (1997); Barcelona Dragons (1998); New Orleans Saints (1999)*
- * Offseason or practice squad member only

Awards and highlights
- First-team All-Pac-10 (1996)
- Stats at Pro Football Reference

Armon Williams (born August 13, 1973) is an American former professional football player who was a defensive back for the Tennessee Oilers of the National Football League (NFL). He played college football for the Arizona Wildcats. He was selected in the seventh round of the 1997 NFL draft with the 216th overall pick.
