= Dennis Stallings =

American football player (born 1974)

No. 59
- Position: Linebacker

Personal information
- Born: May 25, 1974 (age 52); East St. Louis, Illinois, U.S.
- Listed height: 6 ft 0 in (1.83 m)
- Listed weight: 240 lb (109 kg)

Career information
- High school: East St. Louis Senior
- College: Illinois
- NFL draft: 1997: 6th round, 181st overall pick

Career history
- Tennessee Oilers / Tennessee Titans (1997–1999); Baltimore Ravens (2000)*
- * Offseason or practice squad member only

Career NFL statistics
- Tackles: 2
- Stats at Pro Football Reference

Dennis Stallings (born May 25, 1974) is an American former professional football player who was a linebacker in the National Football League (NFL). He played college football for the Illinois Fighting Illini and was selected in the sixth round of the 1997 NFL draft with the 181st overall pick. He played in the NFL for the Tennessee Oilers from 1997 to 1998, and spent the 1999 season on the injured reserve list.
