= Jason Layman =

American football player (born 1973)

No. 66
- Position: Offensive lineman

Personal information
- Born: July 29, 1973 (age 53); Sevierville, Tennessee, U.S.
- Listed height: 6 ft 5 in (1.96 m)
- Listed weight: 310 lb (141 kg)

Career information
- High school: Sevier Co. (Sevierville)
- College: Tennessee
- NFL draft: 1996: 2nd round, 48th overall pick

Career history
- Houston Oilers / Tennessee Oilers / Tennessee Titans (1996–1999)

Awards and highlights
- Second-team All-American (1995); First-team All-SEC (1995); Second-team All-SEC (1994)

Career NFL statistics
- Games played: 61
- Games started: 16
- Fumble recoveries: 1
- Stats at Pro Football Reference

Jason Layman (born July 29, 1973) is an American former professional football player who was an offensive lineman in the National Football League (NFL). He was selected by the Houston Oilers in the second round of the 1996 NFL draft. He played college football for the Tennessee Volunteers. Layman started 39 consecutive games for the Tennessee Vols between 1992 and 1995. He was named team captain his senior year in 1995. Layman played with two top five draft picks at quarterback in Heath Shuler and Peyton Manning. In 1999, the Titans made it to Super Bowl XXXIV in which Layman appeared as a substitute. However, they lost to the Kurt Warner-led St. Louis Rams 23–16.
