= Terry Killens =

American football player and official (born 1974)

No. 50, 56, 52
- Position: Linebacker

Personal information
- Born: March 24, 1974 (age 52); Cincinnati, Ohio, U.S.
- Listed height: 6 ft 1 in (1.85 m)
- Listed weight: 235 lb (107 kg)

Career information
- High school: Purcell Marian (Cincinnati)
- College: Penn State
- NFL draft: 1996: 3rd round, 74th overall pick

Career history
- Houston Oilers/Tennessee Titans (1996–2000); San Francisco 49ers (2001); Denver Broncos (2002)*; Seattle Seahawks (2002); San Francisco 49ers (2003)*
- * Offseason or practice squad member only

Awards and highlights
- Second-team All-Big Ten (1995)

Career NFL statistics
- Tackles: 83
- Sacks: 1
- Fumble recoveries: 1
- Stats at Pro Football Reference

Terry Deleon Killens (born March 24, 1974) is an American football official and former linebacker. He played seven seasons in the National Football League (NFL) for the Houston Oilers/Tennessee Titans, the San Francisco 49ers, and the Seattle Seahawks. He was drafted in the third round of the 1996 NFL draft. In the 1999 season, the Titans made it to Super Bowl XXXIV, in which Killens appeared as a substitute; however, they lost to the Kurt Warner-led St. Louis Rams.

Killens has been a football official since at least 2013, working in the American Athletic Conference (AAC). In 2019, Killens was also an official in the Alliance of American Football (AAF), working as an umpire on the crew led by referee Tra Blake.

It was announced in April 2019 that Killens would be joining the NFL officiating staff for the 2019 season. He wears uniform number 77, which was previously worn by three-time Super Bowl referee Terry McAulay (and before that, Mike Pereira). Killens works at the umpire position, as he did in the AAC and AAF.

Killens was the umpire for Super Bowl LVIII in 2024, making him the first person to both play in and officiate a Super Bowl.
