= James Ritchey =

American football player (born 1973)

No. 7, 16
- Position: Quarterback

Personal information
- Born: July 10, 1973 (age 53); Honolulu, Hawaii, U.S.
- Listed height: 6 ft 2 in (1.88 m)
- Listed weight: 220 lb (100 kg)

Career information
- High school: Copperas Cove (Copperas Cove, Texas)
- College: Stephen F. Austin
- NFL draft: 1996: undrafted

Career history
- Houston/Tennessee Oilers (1996–1997); Barcelona Dragons (1998)

Awards and highlights
- Southland passing leader (1995)

Career NFL statistics
- Passing yards: 15
- Passer rating: 97.9
- Stats at Pro Football Reference

James Alan Ritchey (born July 10, 1973) is an American former professional football player who was a quarterback in the National Football League (NFL). He was signed by the Houston Oilers as an undrafted free agent in 1996 and was also a member of the Barcelona Dragons. Ritchey played college football for the Stephen F. Austin Lumberjacks, finishing his career ranked third in school history with 5,436 passing yards and 5,851 yards total offense.
