= Mike Halapin =

American football player (born 1973)

No. 93, 79
- Positions: Defensive tackle, offensive guard

Personal information
- Born: July 1, 1973 (age 53); New Kensington, Pennsylvania, U.S.
- Listed height: 6 ft 5 in (1.96 m)
- Listed weight: 310 lb (141 kg)

Career information
- High school: The Kiski School (Saltsburg, Pennsylvania)
- College: Pittsburgh
- NFL draft: 1996: undrafted

Career history
- Houston/Tennessee Oilers (1996–1997); Rhein Fire (1999); New Orleans Saints (1999–2000)
- Stats at Pro Football Reference

Mike Halapin (born July 1, 1973) is an American former professional football player who was a defensive tackle and offensive guard in the National Football League (NFL). He played college football for the Pittsburgh Panthers. He played defensive tackle for the NFL's Houston Oilers in 1996 and the Tennessee Oilers in 1997. He played offensive guard in NFL Europe for the Rhein Fire in 1999 and in the NFL for the New Orleans Saints in 1999 and 2000.
