= Rayna Stewart =

American football player and coach (born 1973)

Tennessee Titans
- Title: Assistant special teams coordinator

Personal information
- Born: June 18, 1973 (age 53); Oklahoma City, Oklahoma, U.S.
- Listed height: 5 ft 10 in (1.78 m)
- Listed weight: 202 lb (92 kg)

Career information
- Position: Safety (No. 26, 21)
- High school: Chatsworth (CA)
- College: Northern Arizona
- NFL draft: 1996: 5th round, 143rd overall pick

Career history

Playing
- Houston/Tennessee Oilers (1996–1997); Miami Dolphins (1998); Jacksonville Jaguars (1999–2000)

Coaching
- Northwestern (2007–2008) Graduate assistant; Tennessee Titans (2009–2010) Defensive quality control coach; Vanderbilt (2015–2018); Director of player development (2015–2017); Special teams quality control coach (2018); Green Bay Packers (2019–2021); Special teams quality control coach (2019–2020); Assistant special teams coach (2021); Dallas Cowboys (2022–2024) Assistant special teams coach; Tennessee Titans (2025–present) Assistant special teams coach

Career NFL statistics
- Tackles: 86
- Sacks: 0.5
- Interceptions: 2
- Stats at Pro Football Reference

Rayna Cottrell Stewart II (born June 18, 1973) is an American professional football coach and former safety who is the assistant special teams coach for the Tennessee Titans of the National Football League (NFL).

Pre-draft measurables
Height	Weight	Arm length	Hand span	40-yard dash	10-yard split	20-yard split	20-yard shuttle	Vertical jump	Broad jump	Bench press
5 ft 9 7/8 in (1.77 m)	197 lb (89 kg)	30 5/8 in (0.78 m)	9 1/8 in (0.23 m)	4.68 s	1.63 s	2.67 s	4.10 s	34.0 in (0.86 m)	9 ft 1 in (2.77 m)	19 reps
All values from NFL Combine

He played five seasons for the Houston/Tennessee Oilers, Miami Dolphins, and Jacksonville Jaguars. He was selected by the Houston Oilers in the fifth round of the 1996 NFL draft with the 143rd overall pick.

== Coaching career ==
=== Northwestern Wildcats ===
Stewart served as a graduate assistant at Northwestern University under Pat Fitzgerald from 2007 through 2009.

=== Tennessee Titans ===
On February 24, 2009, Stewart was hired the Tennessee Titans as a defensive quality control coach under head coach Jeff Fisher. This would be his first coaching position in the NFL. Following the 2010 season and Fisher's choice to leave the Titans, Stewart was not retained by new head coach, Mike Munchak.

=== Vanderbilt Commodores ===
In June 2015, Vanderbilt head coach Derek Mason hired Stewart as Director of High School Relations. Mason and Stewart were teammates while playing at Northern Arizona University. In 2018, he switched to a special teams assistant coach on Mason's staff.

=== Green Bay Packers ===
On February 7, 2019, head coach Matt LaFleur hired Stewart as a special teams quality control coach for the Green Bay Packers. On March 1, 2021, he was promoted to assistant special teams coach.

=== Dallas Cowboys ===
On March 25, 2022, the Dallas Cowboys hired Stewart as their assistant special teams coordinator reporting to John Fassel and head coach Mike McCarthy.

=== Tennessee Titans (second stint) ===
On January 27, 2025, Stewart joined Fassel and left the Cowboys to join the Tennessee Titans as their new assistant special teams coordinator and special teams coordinator, respectively, on head coach Brian Callahan's staff. Following the firing of Callahan and the end of the 2025 season, new head coach Robert Saleh chose to keep Stewart on his staff.
