= John Henry Mills =

American football player (born 1969)

No. 48, 55, 87, 44, 45
- Position: Linebacker

Personal information
- Born: October 31, 1969 (age 57); Jacksonville, Florida, U.S.
- Listed height: 6 ft 0 in (1.83 m)
- Listed weight: 226 lb (103 kg)

Career information
- High school: Amos P. Godby (Tallahassee, Florida)
- College: Wake Forest
- NFL draft: 1993: 5th round, 131st overall pick

Career history
- Houston Oilers (1993–1996); Oakland Raiders (1997–1998); Cleveland Browns (1999)*; Minnesota Vikings (1999)
- * Offseason or practice squad member only

Awards and highlights
- Pro Bowl (1996); 3× First-team All-ACC (1990, 1991, 1992)

Career NFL statistics
- Fumble recoveries: 2
- Receptions: 4
- Receiving yards: 34
- Stats at Pro Football Reference

John Henry Mills (born October 31, 1969) is an American former professional football player who was a running back, linebacker and tight end in the National Football League (NFL) for the Houston Oilers, Oakland Raiders and the Minnesota Vikings. Mills was selected to the Pro Bowl after the 1996 season as a special teams captain. He played college football for Wake Forest Demon Deacons, where he was an Alpha Sigma Phi. Mills is currently an outside linebacker coach for Clear Lake High School, in Houston, Texas. John Henry Mills was a four-year letterman at tight end under head coach Bill Dooley. Mills is Wake's all-time leading receiver among tight ends with 142 receptions for 1,652 yards. A three-time All-ACC first-team selection from 1990 through 1992, he finished third in the ACC in receptions in 1990 with 46 and led the league in 1991 with 51. Against Duke in 1990, he caught 12 passes for 230 yards, still the second-most receiving yards in a game in school history. Mills is also announced in the 2008 ACC Football Championship Game Legends Class. A fifth-round pick of the Houston Oilers in the 1993 NFL Draft, Mills played seven seasons in the NFL with Houston, Oakland and Minnesota. In 1996, while with the Oilers, he earned All-Pro honors as a special teams player.
