= Melvin Hayes =

American football player (born 1973)

No. 79
- Position: Offensive Tackle

Personal information
- Born: April 28, 1973 (age 53); New Orleans, Louisiana, U.S.
- Listed height: 6 ft 6 in (1.98 m)
- Listed weight: 328 lb (149 kg)

Career information
- High school: River Ridge (LA) John Curtis Christian
- College: Mississippi State
- NFL draft: 1995: 4th round, 106th overall pick

Career history
- New York Jets (1995–1996); Houston Oilers (1996); Tennessee Oilers (1997)

Career NFL statistics
- Games played: 4
- Stats at Pro Football Reference

Melvin Anthony Hayes (born April 28, 1973) is an American former professional football player who was an offensive tackle for the New York Jets of the National Football League (NFL) from 1995 to 1996. He played college football for the Mississippi State Bulldogs.
