= Roderick Lewis =

American football player (born 1971)

No. 49, 88
- Position: Tight end

Personal information
- Born: June 9, 1971 (age 55); Washington, D.C., U.S.
- Listed height: 6 ft 5 in (1.96 m)
- Listed weight: 254 lb (115 kg)

Career information
- High school: Bishop Dunne (Dallas, Texas)
- College: Arizona (1989–1993)
- NFL draft: 1994: 5th round, 157th overall pick

Career history
- Houston/Tennessee Oilers (1994–1997); San Diego Chargers (1998)*
- * Offseason or practice squad member only

Career NFL statistics
- Receptions: 28
- Receiving yards: 221
- Touchdowns: 0
- Stats at Pro Football Reference

Roderick Albert Lewis (born June 9, 1971) is an American former professional football player who was a tight end for four seasons with the Houston/Tennessee Oilers of the National Football League (NFL). He was selected by the Oilers in the fifth round of the 1994 NFL draft after playing college football for the Arizona Wildcats.

== Early life and college ==
Roderick Albert Lewis was born on June 9, 1971, in Washington, D.C. He attended Bishop Dunne Catholic School in Dallas, Texas.

Lewis played college football for the Wildcats of the University of Arizona. He was redshirted in 1989 and was a four-year letterman from 1990 to 1993. He caught two passes for 20 yards and one touchdown in 1992 and six passes for 74 yards in 1993.

== Professional career ==
Lewis was selected by the Houston Oilers in the fifth round, with the 157th overall pick, of the 1994 NFL draft. He officially signed with the team on July 16. He played in three games, starting one, in 1994, recording four receptions for 48 yards on six targets. Lewis appeared in all 16 games, starting nine, during the 1995 season, catching 16 passes for 116 yards on 21 targets. He played in all 16 games for the second consecutive year, starting seven, in 1996, totaling seven receptions for 50 yards on ten targets. He became a free agent after season and re-signed with the newly-renamed Tennessee Oilers on July 10, 1997. Lewis appeared in ten games, starting one, in 1997, recording one reception for seven yards on three targets. He became a free agent after the 1997 season.

Lewis signed with the San Diego Chargers on June 11, 1998. He was released on August 24, 1998.
