= James McKeehan =

American football player (born 1973)

No. 87
- Position: Tight end

Personal information
- Born: August 9, 1973 (age 53); Houston, Texas, U.S.
- Listed height: 6 ft 3 in (1.91 m)
- Listed weight: 251 lb (114 kg)

Career information
- High school: Willis (TX)
- College: Texas A&M
- NFL draft: 1995: undrafted

Career history
- Seattle Seahawks (1995)*; Houston/Tennessee Oilers (1995–1997)
- * Offseason or practice squad member only

Awards and highlights
- Second-team All-SWC (1994)

Career NFL statistics
- Return yards: 6
- Stats at Pro Football Reference

James McKeehan (born August 9, 1973) is an American former professional football player who was a tight end in the National Football League (NFL). He played college football for the Texas A&M Aggies. He played in the NFL for the Houston Oilers in 1996 and Tennessee Oilers in 1997.
