= Erik Norgard =

American football player (born 1965)

No. 64, 52
- Positions: Guard, center

Personal information
- Born: November 4, 1965 (age 61); Bellevue, Washington, U.S.
- Listed height: 6 ft 1 in (1.85 m)
- Listed weight: 282 lb (128 kg)

Career information
- High school: Arlington (Arlington, Washington)
- College: Western Washington; Colorado
- NFL draft: 1989: undrafted

Career history
- Houston Oilers (1989–1994); → San Antonio Riders (1992); Atlanta Falcons (1995)*; Houston Oilers/Tennessee Oilers (1995–1998); New York Jets (1999)*
- * Offseason or practice squad member only

Awards and highlights
- Second-team All-Big Eight (1988)

Career NFL statistics
- Games played: 108
- Games started: 12
- Fumble recoveries: 2
- Stats at Pro Football Reference

Erik Norgard (born November 4, 1965) is an American former professional football player who played in the National Football League as a center from 1989 to 1999.
