= Josh Evans (defensive lineman) =

American football player (1972–2021)

No. 91
- Position: Defensive tackle

Personal information
- Born: September 6, 1972; Langdale, Alabama, U.S.
- Died: February 4, 2021 (aged 48); Fayetteville, Georgia, U.S.
- Listed height: 6 ft 3 in (1.91 m)
- Listed weight: 280 lb (127 kg)

Career information
- High school: Lanett West (AL)
- College: UAB
- NFL draft: 1995: undrafted

Career history
- Dallas Cowboys (1995)*; Houston Oilers/Tennessee Oilers/Tennessee Titans (1995–2001); New York Jets (2002–2004)
- * Offseason or practice squad member only

Career NFL statistics
- Tackles: 141
- Sacks: 21.5
- Fumble recoveries: 5
- Stats at Pro Football Reference

Mijoshki Antwon Evans (September 6, 1972 – February 4, 2021) was an American professional football player.

== Career ==
Evans played collegiately at the University of Alabama at Birmingham in Birmingham, Alabama with whom he was a four-year starter. Evans was signed as an undrafted free agent in 1995 by the Houston Oilers and stayed with them during the franchise's move to Tennessee. During the 1999 AFC Championship Game against the Jacksonville Jaguars, Evans tackled quarterback Mark Brunell in the end zone for a safety. The Titans then made it to Super Bowl XXXIV, in which Evans started. However, they lost to the Kurt Warner-led St. Louis Rams. In 2000, Evans served a one-year suspension for violating the league's substance abuse policy. In 2002, Evans signed with The New York Jets with whom he spent the last three seasons of his NFL career.

Evans died in February 2021 at the age of 48 after a battle with kidney cancer.
