= 2000 Tennessee Titans season =

41st season in franchise history

- Owner: Bud Adams
- General manager: Floyd Reese
- Head coach: Jeff Fisher
- Offensive coordinator: Mike Heimerdinger
- Defensive coordinator: Gregg Williams
- Home stadium: Adelphia Coliseum

Results
- Record: 13–3
- Division place: 1st AFC Central
- Playoffs: Lost Divisional Playoffs (vs. Ravens) 10–24
- Pro Bowlers: RB Eddie George; T Brad Hopkins; LG Bruce Matthews; TE Frank Wycheck; DE Jevon Kearse; CB Samari Rolle; S Blaine Bishop; KR Derrick Mason

The 2000 Tennessee Titans season was the franchise’s 41st season and their 31st in the National Football League (NFL). It was the team’s second as the “Titans.” The team entered the season as the defending AFC Champions, having narrowly lost Super Bowl XXXIV to the St. Louis Rams.

Tennessee’s 13–3 record was the best in the NFL in 2000, and earned the Titans a first-round bye and home-field advantage throughout the playoffs. In the Titans’ first playoff game, however, they were upset by their pre-realignment division rivals, fourth-seeded Baltimore Ravens, who would go on to win the Super Bowl.

The 2000 Titans are best remembered for their elite defensive squad, which allowed a mere 191 points during the regular season, the third-lowest of any team in the 16-game season era from 1978 to 2021, after only the 1986 Chicago Bears, and the 2000 Baltimore Ravens, the team that Tennessee would fall to in the divisional round of the playoffs.

The 2006 edition of Pro Football Prospectus, listed the 2000 Titans as one of their “Heartbreak Seasons”, in which teams “dominated the entire regular season only to falter in the playoffs, unable to close the deal.”

Said Pro Football Prospectus of the 2000 Titans,

Only one of the last eight teams to lose the Super Bowl has made the playoffs the next season: the 2000 Tennessee Titans. (Note: Ranging from 1998 to 2005) The Titans did not just make the playoffs; they waltzed in with the highest efficiency rating in the league and a 13–3 record. The three losses had come by a combined seven points.

The Titans first playoff game came against their bitter division rivals, the Baltimore Ravens,

Pro Football Prospectus continued

Clearly prepared for a rematch with Baltimore’s stifling defense, the Titans outgained the Ravens 317 yards to 134. They converted 23 first downs to the Ravens’ 6. They had a time of possession advantage of 40:29–19:31. And they lost the game 24–10.

== Offseason ==
Additions	Subtractions
WR Carl Pickens (Bengals)	T Jon Runyan (Eagles)
LB Randall Godfrey (Cowboys)	LB Doug Colman (Browns)
T Fred Miller (Rams)	LB Barron Wortham (Cowboys)
	LB Joe Bowden (Cowboys)
	TE Jackie Harris (Cowboys)
	S Anthony Dorsett (Raiders)

=== NFL draft ===
2000 Tennessee Titans draft
Round	Pick	Player	Position	College	Notes
1	30	Keith Bulluck *	Linebacker	Syracuse	
3	68	Erron Kinney	Tight end	Florida	
3	93	Byron Frisch	Defensive end	BYU	
4	124	Bobby Myers	Safety	Wisconsin	
4	128	Peter Sirmon	Linebacker	Oregon	
5	135	Aric Morris	Safety	Michigan State	
5	160	Frank Chamberlin	Linebacker	Boston College	
6	197	Robaire Smith	Defensive End	Michigan State	
7	213	Mike Green	Running back	Houston	
7	237	Wes Shivers	Guard	Mississippi State	
Made roster * Made at least one Pro Bowl during career

=== Undrafted free agents ===
2000 undrafted free agents of note
Player	Position	College
Demario Brown	Running back	Utah State
Kareem Clark	Cornerback	Arizona State
Chris Coleman	Wide receiver	NC State
Wade Davis	Cornerback	Weber State

== Personnel ==
=== Staff ===
2000 Tennessee Titans staff
Front office: Founder/owner/chairman of the board/CEO – Bud Adams; President/chief operating officer – Jeff Diamond; Executive vice president/general manager – Floyd Reese; Director of player personnel – Rich Snead; Head coaches: Executive vice president/head coach – Jeff Fisher; Assistant head coach/offense – George Henshaw; Offensive coaches: Offensive coordinator – Mike Heimerdinger; Running backs – Sherman Smith; Wide receivers – Steve Walters; Offensive line – Mike Munchak; Offensive assistant/quality control – Craig Johnson	Defensive coaches: Defensive coordinator – Gregg Williams; Defensive line – Jim Washburn; Linebackers/third down package – Jim Schwartz; Defensive backs – Jerry Gray; Defensive assistant/quality control – Ronnie Vinklarek; Special teams coaches: Special teams – Alan Lowry; Strength and conditioning: Strength and conditioning – Steve Watterson

=== Roster ===
2000 Tennessee Titans roster
Quarterbacks (QB): 9 Steve McNair; 14 Neil O'Donnell; 12 Billy Volek; Running backs (RB): 27 Eddie George; 20 Mike Green; 41 Lorenzo Neal FB; 22 Rodney Thomas; Wide receivers (WR): 17 Chris Coleman; 85 Derrick Mason KR/PR; 86 Carl Pickens; 81 Chris Sanders; 82 Yancey Thigpen; Tight ends (TE): 88 Erron Kinney; 83 Mike Leach; 89 Frank Wycheck	Offensive linemen (OL): 66 Gennaro DiNapoli C/G; 72 Brad Hopkins T; 60 Kevin Long C; 76 Jason Mathews T; 74 Bruce Matthews G/LS; 71 Fred Miller T; 75 Benji Olson G; 69 Zach Piller G; 73 Scott Sanderson G/T; Defensive linemen (DL): 96 Keith Embray DE; 97 Jason Fisk DT; 92 Henry Ford DE/DT; 93 Byron Frisch DE; 99 Kenny Holmes DE; 90 Jevon Kearse DE; 95 Joe Salave'a DT; 98 Robaire Smith DE/DT; 78 John Thornton DT; 77 Rod Walker DT	Linebackers (LB): 53 Keith Bulluck OLB; 57 Frank Chamberlin MLB; 51 Greg Favors OLB; 56 Randall Godfrey MLB; 50 Terry Killens OLB; 55 Eddie Robinson OLB; 59 Peter Sirmon OLB; Defensive backs (DB): 23 Blaine Bishop SS; 33 Michael Booker CB; 38 George McCullough CB; 28 Aric Morris FS/SS; 32 Bobby Myers FS; 35 Perry Phenix SS; 31 Marcus Robertson FS; 21 Samari Rolle CB; 37 Dainon Sidney CB; 25 Denard Walker CB; Special teams (ST): 3 Al Del Greco K; 15 Craig Hentrich P	Practice squad: 48 James Dearth LS; 16 Andy McCullough WR; 67 Ian Rafferty T; 84 Bashir Yamini WR; Reserve: 24 DeMario Brown RB (IR); -- Larry Brown TE (PUP); 87 Kevin Dyson WR (IR); -- Chris Jackson WR (IR); 40 Brandon McLemore RB (IR); 30 Donald Mitchell CB (IR); 80 Michael Roan TE (IR); 36 Brad Ware S (PUP); 18 Lenny Ware WR (PUP); Rookies in italics 53 active, 9 reserve, 4 practice squad

== Schedule ==
=== Preseason ===
Week	Date	Opponent	Result	Record
1	August 5	Kansas City Chiefs	W 14–10	1–0
2	August 14	St. Louis Rams	W 30–3	2–0
3	August 18	at Philadelphia Eagles	L 32–34	2–1
4	August 25	at Chicago Bears	W 34–28	3–1

=== Regular season ===
Week	Date	Opponent	Result	Venue	Attendance	Record
1	September 3	at Buffalo Bills	L 13–16	Ralph Wilson Stadium	72,492	0–1
2	September 10	Kansas City Chiefs	W 17–14 (OT)	Adelphia Coliseum	68,203	1–1
3	Bye					
4	September 24	at Pittsburgh Steelers	W 23–20	Three Rivers Stadium	51,769	2–1
5	October 1	New York Giants	W 28–14	Adelphia Coliseum	68,341	3–1
6	October 8	at Cincinnati Bengals	W 23–14	Paul Brown Stadium	63,406	4–1
7	October 16	Jacksonville Jaguars	W 27–13	Adelphia Coliseum	68,498	5–1
8	October 22	at Baltimore Ravens	W 14–6	PSINet Stadium	69,200	6–1
9	October 30	at Washington Redskins	W 27–21	FedExField	83,472	7–1
10	November 5	Pittsburgh Steelers	W 9–7	Adelphia Coliseum	68,498	8–1
11	November 12	Baltimore Ravens	L 23–24	Adelphia Coliseum	68,490	8–2
12	November 19	Cleveland Browns	W 24–10	Adelphia Coliseum	68,498	9–2
13	November 26	at Jacksonville Jaguars	L 13–16	Alltel Stadium	65,454	9–3
14	December 3	at Philadelphia Eagles	W 15–13	Veterans Stadium	65,639	10–3
15	December 10	Cincinnati Bengals	W 35–3	Adelphia Coliseum	68,498	11–3
16	December 17	at Cleveland Browns	W 24–0	Cleveland Browns Stadium	72,318	12–3
17	December 25	Dallas Cowboys	W 31–0	Adelphia Coliseum	68,498	13–3

=== Week 14 @ Philadelphia Eagles ===
The Titans defeated the Eagles for the first time in franchise history, as they were 0-6 against the team when they were the Houston Oilers. Houston's current NFL team is 0-6 against the Eagles as of 2024.

== Standings ==
AFC Central
	W	L	T	PCT	PF	PA	STK
^{(1)} Tennessee Titans	13	3	0	.813	346	191	W4
^{(4)} Baltimore Ravens	12	4	0	.750	333	165	W7
Pittsburgh Steelers	9	7	0	.563	321	255	W2
Jacksonville Jaguars	7	9	0	.438	367	327	L2
Cincinnati Bengals	4	12	0	.250	185	359	L1
Cleveland Browns	3	13	0	.188	161	419	L5

== Playoffs ==
=== AFC Divisional Playoff ===
Baltimore Ravens 24, Tennessee Titans 10

Quarter	1	2	3	4	Total
Ravens	0	7	3	14	24
Titans	7	0	3	0	10

at Adelphia Coliseum, Nashville, Tennessee

- Game time: 12:30 p.m. EST/11:30 a.m. CST
- Game weather: 55 °F (12.8 °C), cloudy
- Game attendance: 68,527
- Referee: Bernie Kukar
- TV announcers (CBS): Dick Enberg, Dan Dierdorf, and Bonnie Bernstein

Despite having only 134 yards of total offense, six first downs, and two punts blocked by Chris Coleman, the Ravens broke a 10–10 tie in the fourth quarter with Anthony Mitchell's 90-yard touchdown return of a blocked Al Del Greco field goal and then added seven more with a 50-yard interception return by Ray Lewis.

== Awards and records ==
- Led NFL, Average Time of Possession (33 minutes, 48 seconds per game)
- Led NFL, Pass Defense
- Led NFL, Total Defense
- Eddie George, PFW/PFWA All-Pro Team
- Derrick Mason, Associated Press All-Pro
- Derrick Mason, All-NFL Team (as selected by the Associated Press, Pro Football Weekly, and the Pro Football Writers of America)
- Derrick Mason, NFL Special Teams Player of the Month, October
- Derrick Mason, Pro Football Writers of America All-Pro Team
- Bruce Matthews, All-NFL Team (as selected by the Associated Press, Pro Football Weekly, and the Pro Football Writers of America)
- Bruce Matthews, Associated Press All-Pro
- Bruce Matthews, PFW/PFWA All-Pro Team
- Samari Rolle, Associated Press All-Pro
- Samari Rolle, All-NFL Team (as selected by the Associated Press, Pro Football Weekly, and the Pro Football Writers of America)
- Samari Rolle, Pro Football Writers of America All-Pro Team
