= 1998 Tennessee Oilers season =

39th season in franchise history, last with the Oilers name

- Owner: Bud Adams
- General manager: Floyd Reese
- Head coach: Jeff Fisher
- Home stadium: Vanderbilt Stadium

Results
- Record: 8–8
- Division place: 2nd AFC Central
- Playoffs: Did not qualify
- Pro Bowlers: RB Eddie George; G Bruce Matthews; P Craig Hentrich

Uniform
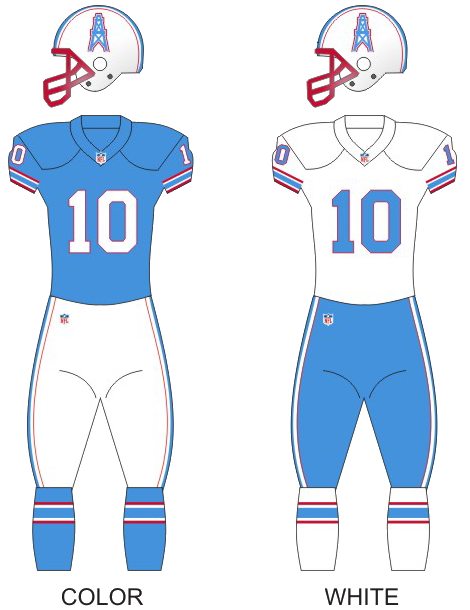

The 1998 Tennessee Oilers season was the franchise's 39th season overall, 29th with the National Football League (NFL), and their final season as the Oilers; they would be renamed the Titans the following year.

The team matched their previous season's output of 8–8, marking their third straight season with exactly eight wins. The Oilers failed to qualify for the playoffs for the fifth consecutive year.

The 1998 season was the only year the Oilers would play in Vanderbilt Stadium, an undersized stadium that was used as a temporary stopgap until the team's new permanent stadium could be constructed. The Oilers, who had originally intended to stay in Houston until the stadium was finished, were 'forced out' of Houston due to poor attendance in 1996, and were again forced out of their "Plan B," Liberty Bowl Memorial Stadium in Memphis, after attendance was even worse there in 1997.

== Offseason ==
=== NFL draft ===
1998 Tennessee Oilers draft
Round	Pick	Player	Position	College	Notes
1	16	Kevin Dyson	Wide receiver	Utah	
2	46	Samari Rolle *	Cornerback	Florida State	
3	77	Dainon Sidney	Cornerback	UAB	
4	107	Joe Salave'a	Defensive tackle	Arizona	
5	139	Benji Olson	Guard	Washington	
6	168	Lee Wiggins	Defensive back	South Carolina	
7	205	Jimmy Sprotte	Linebacker	Arizona	
7	229	Kevin Long	Center	Florida State	
Made roster * Made at least one Pro Bowl during career

== Personnel ==
=== Staff ===
1998 Tennessee Oilers staff
Front office: Owner/chairman of the board/president – Bud Adams; Executive vice-president/general manager – Floyd Reese; Director of player personnel – Rich Snead; Director of college scouting – Glenn Cumbee; Director of Regional Scouting – Mike Holovak; Head coaches: Head coach – Jeff Fisher; Offensive coaches: Offensive coordinator – Les Steckel; Running backs – Sherman Smith; Wide receivers – Alan Lowry; Offensive line/tight ends – George Henshaw; Offensive line – Mike Munchak; Offensive assistant/quarterbacks – Bart Andrus	Defensive coaches: Defensive coordinator – Gregg Williams; Defensive line – Rex Norris; Linebackers – O'Neill Gilbert; Defensive backs – Greg Brown; Defensive assistant/Nickel – Jerry Gray; Special teams coaches: Special teams – Russ Purnell; Strength and conditioning: Strength and conditioning – Steve Watterson

=== Roster ===
1998 Tennessee Oilers roster
Quarterbacks (QB): 17 Dave Krieg; 11 Steve Matthews; 9 Steve McNair; Running backs (RB): 22 Mike Archie; 27 Eddie George; 20 Rodney Thomas; Wide receivers (WR): 83 Isaac Byrd; 86 Willie Davis; 87 Kevin Dyson; 86 Joey Kent; 82 Derrick Mason; 81 Chris Sanders; 82 Yancey Thigpen; Tight ends (TE): 88 Jackie Harris; 80 Michael Roan; 89 Frank Wycheck	Offensive linemen (OL): 72 Brad Hopkins T; 66 Jason Layman G; 60 Kevin Long C; 76 Jason Mathews T; 74 Bruce Matthews G; 75 Benji Olson G; 61 Evan Pilgrim G; 69 Jon Runyan T; 73 Scott Sanderson T; 53 Mark Stepnoski C; Defensive linemen (DL): 91 Josh Evans DT; 92 Henry Ford DT; 99 Kenny Holmes DE; 98 Pratt Lyons DE; 90 James Roberson DE; 95 Joe Salave'a DT; 93 Mike Sutton DE; 96 Gary Walker DT	Linebackers (LB): 58 Joe Bowden MLB; 57 Lenoy Jones OLB; 50 Terry Killens OLB; 51 Lonnie Marts OLB; 55 Eddie Robinson OLB; 59 Dennis Stallings MLB; 52 Barron Wortham MLB; Defensive backs (DB): 23 Blaine Bishop SS; 30 Anthony Dorsett CB/S; 24 Steve Jackson FS; 29 Darryll Lewis CB; 28 George McCullough CB; 35 Perry Phenix SS; 31 Marcus Robertson FS; 21 Samari Rolle CB; 37 Dainon Sidney CB; 25 Denard Walker CB; Special teams (ST): 3 Al Del Greco K; 15 Craig Hentrich P	Practice squad: 49 Josh Bradley TE; 26 Spencer George RB; 62 Lonnie Gilbert G; 18 Isaiah Mustafa WR; 94 Chris Ward DE; Reserve: 78 Anthony Cook DE (IR); 64 Erik Norgard C (IR); 53 active, 2 inactive, 5 practice squad Rookies in italics

== Schedule ==
=== Preseason ===
Week	Date	Opponent	Result	Record	Venue	Recap
1	August 7	at Atlanta Falcons	**W** 31–16	1–0	Georgia Dome	Recap
2	August 15	Washington Redskins	**L** 24–27	1–1	Vanderbilt Stadium	Recap
3	August 22	at New Orleans Saints	**W** 26–24	2–1	Louisiana Superdome	Recap
4	August 29	Denver Broncos	**W** 16–13	3–1	Vanderbilt Stadium	Recap

=== Regular season ===
Week	Date	Opponent	Result	Record	Venue	Recap
1	September 6	at **Cincinnati Bengals**	**W** 23–14	1–0	Cinergy Field	Recap
2	September 13	San Diego Chargers	**L** 7–13	1–1	Vanderbilt Stadium	Recap
3	September 20	at New England Patriots	**L** 16–27	1–2	Foxboro Stadium	Recap
4	September 27	**Jacksonville Jaguars**	**L** 22–27	1–3	Vanderbilt Stadium	Recap
5	Bye					
6	October 11	at **Baltimore Ravens**	**W** 12–8	2–3	Ravens Stadium at Camden Yards	Recap
7	October 18	**Cincinnati Bengals**	**W** 44–14	3–3	Vanderbilt Stadium	Recap
8	October 25	Chicago Bears	**L** 20–23	3–4	Vanderbilt Stadium	Recap
9	November 1	at **Pittsburgh Steelers**	**W** 41–31	4–4	Three Rivers Stadium	Recap
10	November 8	at Tampa Bay Buccaneers	**W** 31–22	5–4	Raymond James Stadium	Recap
11	November 15	**Pittsburgh Steelers**	**W** 23–14	6–4	Vanderbilt Stadium	Recap
12	November 22	New York Jets	**L** 3–24	6–5	Vanderbilt Stadium	Recap
13	November 29	at Seattle Seahawks	**L** 18–20	6–6	Kingdome	Recap
14	December 6	**Baltimore Ravens**	**W** 16–14	7–6	Vanderbilt Stadium	Recap
15	December 13	at **Jacksonville Jaguars**	**W** 16–13	8–6	Alltel Stadium	Recap
16	December 20	at Green Bay Packers	**L** 22–30	8–7	Lambeau Field	Recap
17	December 26	Minnesota Vikings	**L** 16–26	8–8	Vanderbilt Stadium	Recap
Note: Intra-division opponents are in **bold** text.

=== Game summaries ===
==== Week 1: at Cincinnati Bengals ====
Week One: Tennessee Oilers at Cincinnati Bengals – Game summary

Quarter	1	2	3	4	Total
**Oilers**	3	7	7	6	**23**
Bengals	7	0	7	0	**14**

at Cinergy Field, Cincinnati, Ohio

- Date: September 6
- Game time: 12:00 p.m. CDT/1:00 p.m. EDT
- Game weather: 81 °F (27 °C)
- Game attendance: 55,848
- Referee: Gerry Austin
- TV announcers (CBS): Craig Bolerjack & John Dockery
- Box score

Game information

**First quarter**

- TEN – Al Del Greco 38-yard field goal. Oilers 3–0.
- CIN – Darnay Scott 23-yard pass from Neil O'Donnell (Doug Pelfrey kick). Bengals 7–3.

**Second quarter**

- TEN – Willie Davis 8-yard pass from Steve McNair (Al Del Greco kick). Oilers 10–7.

**Third quarter**

- TEN – Eddie George 3-yard run (Al Del Greco kick). Oilers 17–7.
- CIN – Corey Dillon 3-yard run (Doug Pelfrey kick). Oilers 17–14.

**Fourth quarter**

- TEN – Al Del Greco 31-yard field goal. Oilers 20–14.
- TEN – Al Del Greco 48-yard field goal. Oilers 23–14.

**Top passers**

- TEN – Steve McNair – 10/21, 135 yards, TD
- CIN – Neil O'Donnell – 24/32, 200 yards, TD INT

**Top rushers**

- TEN – Eddie George – 25 rushes, 86 yards, TD
- CIN – Corey Dillon – 19 rushes, 91 yards, TD

**Top receivers**

- TEN – Yancey Thigpen – 4 receptions, 87 yards
- CIN – Carl Pickens – 5 receptions, 69 yards

Steve McNair completed ten passes and a touchdown to Willie Davis but did not play in the second half with an elbow issue; Dave Krieg led three drives ending in points and a 23-14 Oilers win. Neil O’Donnell, joining the Bengals off two tumultuous seasons with the NY Jets, completed twenty-four passes and a touchdown to Darnay Scott in the first quarter but was intercepted in the fourth.

==== Week 2: vs. San Diego Chargers ====
Week Two: San Diego Chargers at Tennessee Oilers – Game summary

Quarter	1	2	3	4	Total
**Chargers**	3	3	7	0	**13**
Oilers	0	7	0	0	**7**

at Vanderbilt Stadium, Nashville, Tennessee

- Date: September 13
- Game time: 12:00 p.m. CDT
- Game weather: 76 °F (24 °C)
- Game attendance: 41,089
- Referee: Tom White
- TV announcers (CBS): Kevin Harlan and Sam Wyche
- Box score

Game information

**First quarter**

- SD – John Carney 48-yard field goal. Chargers 3–0.

**Second quarter**

- SD – John Carney 23-yard field goal. Chargers 6–0.
- TEN – Frank Wycheck 15-yard pass from Steve McNair (Al Del Greco kick). Oilers 7–6.

**Third quarter**

- SD – Natrone Means 1-yard run (John Carney kick). Chargers 13–7.

**Fourth quarter**

- No scoring plays

**Top passers**

- SD – Ryan Leaf – 13/24, 179 yards
- TEN – Steve McNair – 20/34, 193 yards, TD

**Top rushers**

- SD – Natrone Means – 23 rushes, 87 yards, TD
- TEN – Steve McNair – 3 rushes, 31 yards

**Top receivers**

- SD – Bryan Still – 3 receptions, 59 yards
- TEN – Frank Wycheck – 7 receptions, 55 yards, TD

Former Oilers offensive coordinator Kevin Gilbride had been hired as Chargers head coach after Bobby Ross left for the Lions and with rookie Ryan Leaf he led the Chargers to Vanderbilt Stadium (three and a half miles from where Tennessee’s new stadium was being built), a trip ending in a 13-7 Chargers win. Tennessee’s only score was McNair’s fifteen yard strike to Frank Wycheck at the end of the second quarter.

==== Week 3: at New England Patriots ====
Week Three: Tennessee Oilers at New England Patriots – Game summary

Quarter	1	2	3	4	Total
Oilers	3	3	7	3	**16**
**Patriots**	3	3	7	14	**27**

at Foxboro Stadium, Foxboro, Massachusetts

- Date: September 20
- Game time: 12:00 p.m. CDT/1:00 p.m. EDT
- Game weather: 68 °F (20 °C)
- Game attendance: 59,973
- Referee: Bernie Kukar
- TV announcers (CBS): Gus Johnson & Steve Tasker
- Box score

Game information

**First quarter**

- TEN – Al Del Greco 34-yard field goal. Oilers 3–0.
- NE – Adam Vinatieri 43-yard field goal. Tied 3–3.

**Second quarter**

- TEN – Al Del Greco 26-yard field goal. Oilers 6–3.
- NE – Adam Vinatieri 41-yard field goal. Tied 6–6.

**Third quarter**

- TEN – Eddie George 22-yard pass from Steve McNair (Al Del Greco kick). Oilers 13–6.
- NE – Robert Edwards 7-yard run (Adam Vinatieri kick). Tied 13–13.

**Fourth quarter**

- TEN – Al Del Greco 45-yard field goal. Oilers 16–13.
- NE – Terry Glenn 51-yard pass from Drew Bledsoe (Adam Vinatieri kick). Patriots 20–16.
- NE – Lawyer Milloy 30-yard interception return (Adam Vinatieri kick). Patriots 27–16.

**Top passers**

- TEN – Steve McNair – 28/32, 202 yards, TD, 2 INT
- NE – Drew Bledsoe – 18/30, 250 yards, TD

**Top rushers**

- TEN – Eddie George – 23 rushes, 100 yards
- NE – Robert Edwards – 12 rushes, 92 yards, TD

**Top receivers**

- TEN – Eddie George – 4 receptions, 60 yards, TD
- NE – Terry Glenn – 4 receptions, 102 yards, TD

The Oilers faced the Patriots for the first time since their ill-fated 1993 season and the ensuing game became a highly competitive affair. The lead tied or changed seven times as McNair led three field goal drives and completed a twenty-two yard score to Eddie George, but following Drew Bledsoe’s 51-yard score to Terry Glenn (a Bledsoe interception in the second quarter was erased on back to back encroachment penalties) McNair was intercepted by Lawyer Milloy for another Patriots touchdown and 27-16 final.

==== Week 4: vs. Jacksonville Jaguars ====
Week Four: Jacksonville Jaguars at Tennessee Oilers – Game summary

Quarter	1	2	3	4	Total
**Jaguars**	7	7	7	6	**27**
Oilers	10	9	3	0	**22**

at Vanderbilt Stadium, Nashville, Tennessee

- Date: September 27
- Game time: 12:00 p.m. CDT
- Game weather: 81 °F (27 °C)
- Game attendance: 34,656
- Referee: Dick Hantak
- TV announcers (CBS): Gus Johnson & Steve Tasker
- Box score

Game information

**First quarter**

- TEN – Al Del Greco 34-yard field goal. Oilers 3–0.
- JAC – Damon Jones 5-yard pass from Mark Brunell (Mike Hollis kick). Jaguars 7–3.
- TEN – Yancey Thigpen 38-yard pass from Steve McNair (Al Del Greco kick). Oilers 10–7.

**Second quarter**

- TEN – Al Del Greco 32-yard field goal. Oilers 13–7.
- TEN – Yancey Thigpen 18-yard pass from Steve McNair (run failed). Oilers 19–7.
- JAC – Keenan McCardell 7-yard pass from Mark Brunell (Mike Hollis kick). Oilers 19–14.

**Third quarter**

- JAC – Fred Taylor 1-yard run (Mike Hollis kick). Jaguars 21–19.
- TEN – Al Del Greco 32-yard field goal. Oilers 22–21.

**Fourth quarter**

- JAC – Mike Hollis 18-yard field goal. Jaguars 24–22.
- JAC – Mike Hollis 36-yard field goal. Jaguars 27–22.

**Top passers**

- JAC – Mark Brunell – 17/28, 155 yards, 2 TD, 2 INT
- TEN – Steve McNair – 16/30, 198 yards, 2 TD, 2 INT

**Top rushers**

- JAC – Fred Taylor – 25 rushes, 116 yards, TD
- TEN – Eddie George – 14 rushes, 25 yards

**Top receivers**

- JAC – Keenan McCardell – 6 receptions, 68 yards, TD
- TEN – Yancey Thigpen – 6 receptions, 102 yards, 2 TD

The unbeaten Jaguars stayed that way 27-22 in a game where the lead changed five times, three times in the second half. McNair was intercepted twice and following the two minute warning Dave Krieg was put in but completed just one pass.

==== Week 6: at Baltimore Ravens ====
Week Six: Tennessee Oilers at Baltimore Ravens – Game summary

Quarter	1	2	3	4	Total
**Oilers**	6	3	3	0	**12**
Ravens	2	0	3	3	**8**

at Ravens Stadium at Camden Yards, Baltimore, Maryland

- Date: October 11
- Game time: 12:00 p.m. CDT/1:00 p.m. EDT
- Game weather: 61 °F (16 °C)
- Game attendance: 68,561
- Referee: Tony Corrente
- TV announcers (CBS): Gus Johnson & Steve Tasker
- Box score

Game information

**First quarter**

- BAL – Steve McNair sacked in own end zone by Rob Burnett. Ravens 2–0.
- TEN – Steve McNair 40-yard run (run failed). Oilers 6–2.

**Second quarter**

- TEN – Al Del Greco 29-yard field goal. Oilers 9–2.

**Third quarter**

- TEN – Al Del Greco 29-yard field goal. Oilers 12–2.
- BAL – Matt Stover 21-yard field goal. Oilers 12–5.

**Fourth quarter**

- BAL – Matt Stover 45-yard field goal. Oilers 12–8.

**Top passers**

- TEN – Steve McNair – 17/29, 207 yards, INT
- BAL – Eric Zeier – 25/44, 249 yards, INT

**Top rushers**

- TEN – Eddie George – 30 rushes, 121 yards
- BAL – Priest Holmes – 14 rushes, 29 yards

**Top receivers**

- TEN – Willie Davis – 3 receptions, 49 yards
- BAL – Priest Holmes – 13 receptions, 98 yards

In the third ever game at the future M&T Bank Stadium the Ravens opened by sacking Steve McNair for a safety, but after three straight punts McNair answered by running in a 40-yard touchdown. Two subsequent field goals were enough to offset two Ravens field goals and a 12-6 Oilers win.

==== Week 7: vs. Cincinnati Bengals ====
Week Seven: Cincinnati Bengals at Tennessee Oilers – Game summary

Quarter	1	2	3	4	Total
Bengals	0	0	7	7	**14**
**Oilers**	7	13	17	7	**44**

at Vanderbilt Stadium, Nashville, Tennessee

- Date: October 18
- Game time: 12:00 p.m. p.m. CDT
- Game weather: 69 °F (21 °C)
- Game attendance: 33,288
- Referee: Phil Luckett
- TV announcers (CBS): Gus Johnson & Steve Tasker
- Box score

Game information

**First quarter**

- TEN – Jackie Harris 18-yard pass from Mike Archie (Al Del Greco kick). Oilers 7–0.

**Second quarter**

- TEN – Al Del Greco 35-yard field goal. Oilers 10–0.
- TEN – Steve McNair 1-yard run (Al Del Greco kick). Oilers 17–0.
- TEN – Al Del Greco 38-yard field goal. Oilers 20–0.

**Third quarter**

- TEN – Al Del Greco 42-yard field goal. Oilers 23–0.
- TEN – Joe Bowden 12-yard fumble return (Al Del Greco kick). Oilers 30–0.
- CIN – Corey Dillon 12-yard run (Doug Pelfrey kick). Oilers 30–7.
- TEN – Kevin Dyson 45-yard pass from Steve McNair (Al Del Greco kick). Oilers 37–14.

**Fourth quarter**

- CIN – Damon Gibson 76-yard pass from Neil O'Donnell (Doug Pelfrey kick). Oilers 37–14.
- TEN – Rodney Thomas 1-yard run (Al Del Greco kick). Oilers 44–14.

**Top passers**

- CIN – Neil O'Donnell – 11/22, 192 yards, TD
- TEN – Steve McNair – 16/21, 277 yards, TD

**Top rushers**

- CIN – Corey Dillon – 14 rushes, 124 yards, TD
- TEN – Eddie George – 25 rushes, 107 yards

**Top receivers**

- CIN – Damon Gibson – 1 receptions, 76 yards, TD
- TEN – Chris Sanders – 3 receptions, 101 yards

The Oilers got their first home victory by erupting to 515 yards of offense (304 of them in the first half outclassing the Bengals by 232 yards) and 44 points in a 44-14 slaughter of Cincinnati. Running back Mike Archie opened scoring when he made the Bengals look like meatheads on an 18-yard touchdown to Jackie Harris. Steve McNair completed sixteen passes for 277 yards and a 45-yard score to Kevin Dyson while scoring also on a one-yard sneak.

==== Week 8: vs. Chicago Bears ====
Week Eight: Chicago Bears at Tennessee Oilers – Game summary

Quarter	1	2	3	4	Total
**Bears**	7	3	10	3	**23**
Oilers	0	10	0	10	**20**

at Vanderbilt Stadium, Nashville, Tennessee

- Date: October 25
- Game time: 3:05 p.m. CST
- Game weather: 57 °F (14 °C)
- Game attendance: 40,089
- Referee: Ron Winter
- TV announcers (Fox): Ray Bentley & Ron Pitts
- Box score

Game information

**First quarter**

- CHI – Robert Chancey 1-yard run (Jeff Jaeger kick). Bears 7–0.

**Second quarter**

- TEN – Al Del Greco 29-yard field goal. Bears 7–3.
- CHI – Jeff Jaeger 39-yard field goal. Bears 10–3.
- TEN – Derrick Mason 13-yard pass from Steve McNair (Al Del Greco kick). Tied 10–10.

**Third quarter**

- CHI – Ty Hallock 1-yard (Jeff Jaeger kick). Bears 17–10.
- CHI – Jeff Jaeger 26-yard field goal. Bears 20–10.

**Fourth quarter**

- TEN – Al Del Greco 19-yard field goal. Bears 20–13.
- TEN – Rodney Thomas 7-yard run (Al Del Greco kick). Tied 20–20.
- CHI – Jeff Jaeger 33-yard field goal. Bears 23–20.

**Top passers**

- CHI – Erik Kramer – 13/24, 144 yards
- TEN – Steve McNair – 18/29, 187 yards, TD, INT

**Top rushers**

- CHI – Curtis Enis – 21 rushes, 85 yards
- TEN – Eddie George – 21 rushes, 137 yards

**Top receivers**

- CHI – Curtis Conway – 4 receptions, 51 yards
- TEN – Jackie Harris – 6 receptions, 53 yards

Jeff Fisher faced his former team and his Oilers had a struggle. Fumbles on a double handoff in the first quarter and on the second half opening kick return led to a Bears lead but the Oilers erased a 20-10 gap to tie the game. A Jeff Jaeger field goal with 1:07 to go put the Bears up 23-20 and the Oilers responded by driving to the Bears 31 yard line where the Craig Hentrich field goal kick was blocked for the Bears win.

==== Week 9: at Pittsburgh Steelers ====
Week Nine: Tennessee Oilers at Pittsburgh Steelers – Game summary

Quarter	1	2	3	4	Total
**Oilers**	3	14	10	14	**41**
Steelers	0	7	0	24	**31**

at Three Rivers Stadium, Pittsburgh, Pennsylvania

- Date: November 1
- Game time: 12:00 p.m. CST/1:00 p.m. EST
- Game weather: 47 °F (8 °C)
- Game attendance: 58,222
- Referee: Mike Carey
- TV announcers (CBS): Ian Eagle and Mark May
- Box score

Game information

**First quarter**

- TEN – Al Del Greco 43-yard field goal. Oilers 3–0.

**Second quarter**

- TEN – Frank Wycheck 2-yard pass from Steve McNair (Al Del Greco kick). Oilers 10–0.
- PIT – Charles Johnson 9-yard pass from Kordell Stewart (Norm Johnson kick). Oilers 10–7.
- TEN – Kevin Dyson 6-yard pass from Steve McNair (Al Del Greco kick). Oilers 17–7.

**Third quarter**

- TEN – Al Del Greco 32-yard field goal. Oilers 20–7.
- TEN – Eddie George 37-yard run (Al Del Greco kick). Oilers 27–7.

**Fourth quarter**

- TEN – Willie Davis 29-yard pass from Steve McNair (Al Del Greco kick). Oilers 34–7.
- PIT – Courtney Hawkins 3-yard pass from Kordell Stewart (Kordell Stewart pass to Charles Johnson). Oilers 34–15.
- TEN – Lonnie Marts 27-yard interception return (Al Del Greco kick). Oilers 41–15.
- PIT – Charles Johnson 37-yard pass from Mike Tomczak (Mike Tomczak pass to Charles Johnson). Oilers 41–23.
- PIT – Charles Johnson 2-yard pass from Mike Tomczak (Mike Tomczak pass to Will Blackwell). Oilers 41–31.

**Top passers**

- TEN – Steve McNair – 13/21, 167 yards, 3 TD
- PIT – Kordell Stewart – 23/32, 230 yards, 2 TD, 3 INT

**Top rushers**

- TEN – Eddie George – 34 rushes, 153 yards, TD
- PIT – Jerome Bettis – 11 rushes, 26 yards

**Top receivers**

- TEN – Willie Davis – 5 receptions, 88 yards, TD
- PIT – Charles Johnson – 9 receptions, 115 yards, 3 TD

The Oilers intercepted Kordell Stewart three times while Steve McNair threw three touchdowns as they raced to a 34-7 lead and won 41-31; Mike Tomczak replaced Stewart and threw two late touchdowns.

==== Week 10: at Tampa Bay Buccaneers ====
Week Ten: Tennessee Oilers at Tampa Bay Buccaneers – Game summary

Quarter	1	2	3	4	Total
**Oilers**	3	0	14	14	**31**
Buccaneers	3	13	0	6	**22**

at Raymond James Stadium, Tampa, Florida

- Date: November 8
- Game time: 7:20 p.m. CST/8:20 p.m. EST
- Game weather: 68 °F (20 °C)
- Game attendance: 65,054
- Referee: Larry Nemmers
- TV announcers (ESPN): Mike Patrick, Joe Theismann and Solomon Wilcots
- Box score

Game information

**First quarter**

- TB – Michael Husted 46-yard field goal. Buccaneers 3–0.
- TEN – Al Del Greco 45-yard field goal. Tied 3–3.

**Second quarter**

- TB – Michael Husted 30-yard field goal. Buccaneers 6–3.
- TB – Bert Emanuel 58-yard pass from Trent Dilfer (Michael Husted kick). Buccaneers 13–3.
- TB – Michael Husted 24-yard field goal. Buccaneers 16–3.

**Third quarter**

- TEN – Eddie George 14-yard run (Al Del Greco kick). Buccaneers 16–10.
- TEN – Mike Archie 7-yard run (Al Del Greco kick). Oilers 17–16.

**Fourth quarter**

- TEN – Joe Bowden 1-yard interception return (Al Del Greco kick). Oilers 24–16.
- TB – Reidel Anthony 10-yard pass from Trent Dilfer (pass failed). Oilers 24–22.
- TEN – Steve McNair 71-yard run (Al Del Greco kick). Oilers 31–22.

**Top passers**

- TEN – Steve McNair – 9/16, 123 yards
- TB – Trent Dilfer – 20/38, 294 yards, 2 TD, INT

**Top rushers**

- TEN – Eddie George – 27 rushes, 134 yards, TD
- TB – Warrick Dunn – 14 rushes, 49 yards

**Top receivers**

- TEN – Frank Wycheck – 4 receptions, 66 yards
- TB – Bert Emanuel – 5 receptions, 106 yards, TD

Future Indianapolis Colts head coach Tony Dungy faced the future Tennessee Titans with official announcement of the Titans name adoption pending within the week. The Bucs led 16-3 at the half but the Oilers outscored them 28-6 from there, highlighted by Steve McNair’s 71-yard run at the two minute warning.

==== Week 11: vs. Pittsburgh Steelers ====
Week Eleven: Pittsburgh Steelers at Tennessee Oilers – Game summary

Quarter	1	2	3	4	Total
Steelers	0	14	0	0	**14**
**Oilers**	3	10	0	10	**23**

at Vanderbilt Stadium, Nashville, Tennessee

- Date: November 15
- Game time: 12:00 p.m. CST
- Game weather: 58 °F (14 °C)
- Game attendance: 41,104
- Referee: Johnny Grier
- TV announcers (CBS): Craig Bolerjack and John Dockery
- Box score

Game information

**First quarter**

- TEN – Al Del Greco 46-yard field goal. Oilers 3–0.

**Second quarter**

- PIT – Mark Bruener 10-yard pass from Kordell Stewart (Matt George kick). Steelers 7–3.
- TEN – Willie Davis 25-yard pass from Steve McNair (Al Del Greco kick). Oilers 10–7.
- PIT – Chris Fuamatu-Ma'afala 26-yard pass from Kordell Stewart (Matt George kick). Steelers 14–10.
- TEN – Al Del Greco 24-yard field goal. Steelers 14–13.

**Third quarter**

- No scoring plays

**Fourth quarter**

- TEN – Al Del Greco 22-yard field goal. Oilers 16–14.
- TEN – Michael Roan fumble recovery in end zone (Al Del Greco kick). Oilers 23–14.

**Top passers**

- PIT – Kordell Stewart – 22/28, 239 yards, 2 TD
- TEN – Steve McNair – 19/31, 234 yards, TD, INT

**Top rushers**

- PIT – Jerome Bettis – 14 rushes, 29 yards
- TEN – Eddie George – 25 rushes, 79 yards

**Top receivers**

- PIT – Courtney Hawkins – 4 receptions, 62 yards
- TEN – Willie Davis – 6 receptions, 90 yards, TD

The Oilers change to Titans had become public entering this game and against the future Titans the Steelers led 14-13 at the half on two Kordell Stewart touchdowns (overcoming a failed fourth down conversion on the opening drive). The game was stalemated from there; twice fourth down attempts by the Titans failed, but after a fourth down failure by Stewart in the final five minutes (the attempt called because coach Bill Cowher mistrusted kicker Matt George after a blocked field goal attempt on Pittsburgh’s second possession) McNair completed three passes for a net of 54 yards before the Al Del Greco field goal with three seconds to go. But scoring wasn’t completed as Steelers laterals on the kickoff were driven into their own end zone and a final Tennessee touchdown.

==== Week 12: vs New York Jets ====
Week Twelve: New York Jets at Tennessee Oilers – Game summary

Quarter	1	2	3	4	Total
**Jets**	0	3	7	14	**24**
Oilers	0	3	0	0	**3**

at Vanderbilt Stadium, Nashville, Tennessee

- Date: November 22
- Game time: 3:15 p.m. CST
- Game weather: 44 °F (7 °C)
- Game attendance: 37,084
- Referee: Ron Blum
- TV announcers (CBS): Ian Eagle & Mark May
- Box score

Game information

**First quarter**

- No scoring plays

**Second quarter**

- NYJ – John Hall 43-yard field goal. Jets 3–0.
- TEN – Al Del Greco 34-yard field goal. Tied 3–3.

**Third quarter**

- NYJ – Keyshawn Johnson 3-yard pass from Vinny Testaverde (John Hall kick). Jets 10–3.

**Fourth quarter**

- NYJ – Keith Byars 2-yard pass from Vinny Testaverde (John Hall kick). Jets 17–3.
- NYJ – Curtis Martin 31-yard run (John Hall kick). Jets 24–3.

**Top passers**

- NYJ – Vinny Testaverde – 21/33, 237 yards, 2 TD
- TEN – Steve McNair – 13/24, 137 yards

**Top rushers**

- NYJ – Curtis Martin – 27 rushes, 123 yards, TD
- TEN – Eddie George – 20 rushes, 72 yards

**Top receivers**

- NYJ – Keyshawn Johnson – 10 receptions, 112 yards, TD
- TEN – Frank Wycheck – 5 receptions, 61 yards

With the Titans name adoption now official the Oilers hosted the former New York Titans (a former division rival) and the game was tied 3-3 at the half. From there the Jets scored 21 unanswered points and reached 7-4 with the Oilers falling to 6-5

==== Week 13: at Seattle Seahawks ====
Week Thirteen: Tennessee Oilers at Seattle Seahawks – Game summary

Quarter	1	2	3	4	Total
Oilers	3	3	0	12	**18**
**Seahawks**	0	3	7	10	**20**

at Kingdome, Seattle, Washington

- Date: November 29
- Game time: 3:05 p.m. CST/1:05 p.m.PST
- Game weather: None (indoor stadium)
- Game attendance: 59,048
- Referee: Dick Hantak
- TV announcers (CBS): Gus Johnson and Steve Tasker
- Box score

Game information

**First quarter**

- TEN – Al Del Greco 26-yard field goal. Oilers 3–0.

**Second quarter**

- TEN – Al Del Greco 30-yard field goal. Oilers 6–0.
- SEA – Todd Peterson 50-yard field goal. Oilers 6–3.

**Third quarter**

- SEA – Joey Galloway 7-yard pass from Jon Kitna (Todd Peterson kick). Seahawks 10–6.

**Fourth quarter**

- TEN – Al Del Greco 43-yard field goal. Seahawks 10–9.
- SEA – James McKnight 55-yard pass from Jon Kitna (Todd Peterson kick). Seahawks 17–9.
- TEN – Steve McNair 3-yard run (run failed). Seahawks 17–15.
- TEN – Al Del Greco 42-yard field goal. Oilers 18–17.
- SEA – Todd Peterson 48-yard field goal. Seahawks 20–18.

**Top passers**

- TEN – Steve McNair – 18/34, 199 yards
- SEA – Jon Kitna – 24/39, 298 yards, 2 TD, INT

**Top rushers**

- TEN – Eddie George – 19 rushes, 76 yards
- SEA – Ricky Watters – 14 rushes, 63 yards

**Top receivers**

- TEN – Eddie George – 5 receptions, 64 yards
- SEA – James McKnight – 5 receptions, 113 yards, TD

Former Oiler Warren Moon suited up but did not play for the Seahawks as Seattle clawed to a 17-9 lead, but McNair drove to a touchdown run; Eddie George’s two point run was ruled not to have crossed the goal line plane, so the score was 17-15. After sacking Jon Kitna on the Seahawks drive the Oilers got the ball back and Al Del Greco’s field goal put Tennessee up 18-17. Kitna completed a deep pass to James McKnight and a roughing penalty added fifteen more yards; it ended on Todd Peterson’s 48-yard field goal and 20-18 Seahawks win.

==== Week 14: vs. Baltimore Ravens ====
Week Fourteen: Baltimore Ravens at Tennessee Oilers – Game summary

Quarter	1	2	3	4	Total
Ravens	0	0	7	7	**14**
**Oilers**	10	3	0	3	**16**

at Vanderbilt Stadium, Nashville, Tennessee

- Date: December 6
- Game time: 3:15 p.m. CST
- Game weather: 65 °F (18 °C)
- Game attendance: 31,124
- Referee: Ed Hochuli
- TV announcers (CBS): Tim Brando, Craig James & Lou Holtz
- Box score

Game information

**First quarter**

- TEN – Al Del Greco 48-yard field goal. Oilers 3–0.
- TEN – Eddie George 2-yard run (Al Del Greco kick). Oilers 10–0.

**Second quarter**

- TEN – Al Del Greco 48-yard field goal. Oilers 13–0.

**Third quarter**

- BAL – Floyd Turner 66-yard pass from Jim Harbaugh (Matt Stover kick). Oilers 13–7.

**Fourth quarter**

- TEN – Al Del Greco 33-yard field goal. Oilers 16–7.
- BAL – Floyd Turner 20-yard pass from Jim Harbaugh (Matt Stover kick). Oilers 16–14.

**Top passers**

- BAL – Jim Harbaugh – 15/28, 214 yards, 2 TD, INT
- TEN – Steve McNair – 25/43, 213 yards, INT

**Top rushers**

- BAL – Priest Holmes – 11 rushes, 27 yards
- TEN – Eddie George – 27 rushes, 63 yards, TD

**Top receivers**

- BAL – Floyd Turner – 4 receptions, 108 yards, 2 TD
- TEN – Frank Wycheck – 7 receptions, 74 yards

Hosting the Ravens the Titans ground out a 16-14 win in which the budding bitterness of the rivalry spilled into several incidents including a Brad Hopkins roughness penalty late in the second quarter and a hit out of bounds by the Titans on Ravens quarterback Jim Harbaugh. Harbaugh got the ball back with 1:18 to go but his pass into traffic was intercepted.

==== Week 15: at Jacksonville Jaguars ====
Week Fifteen: Tennessee Oilers at Jacksonville Jaguars – Game summary

Quarter	1	2	3	4	Total
**Oilers**	0	10	0	6	**16**
Jaguars	10	0	0	3	**13**

at Alltel Stadium, Jacksonville, Florida

- Date: December 13
- Game time: 12:00 p.m. CST/1:00 p.m. EST
- Game weather: 73 °F (23 °C)
- Game attendance: 65,657
- Referee: Phil Luckett
- TV announcers (CBS): Gus Johnson & Steve Tasker
- Box score

Game information

**First quarter**

- JAC – Mike Hollis 21-yard field goal. Jaguars 3–0.
- JAC – Fred Taylor 1-yard run (Mike Hollis kick). Jaguars 10–0.

**Second quarter**

- TEN – Jackie Harris 4-yard pass from Steve McNair (Al Del Greco kick). Jaguars 10–7.
- TEN – Al Del Greco 28-yard field goal. Tied 10–10.

**Third quarter**

- No scoring plays

**Fourth quarter**

- TEN – Al Del Greco 30-yard field goal. Oilers 13–10.
- JAC – Mike Hollis 29-yard field goal. Tied 13–13.
- TEN – Al Del Greco 41-yard field goal. Oilers 16–13.

**Top passers**

- TEN – Steve McNair – 22/39, 232 yards, TD, INT
- JAC – Jonathan Quinn – 12/18, 107 yards, INT

**Top rushers**

- TEN – Steve McNair – 11 rushes, 81 yards
- JAC – Fred Taylor – 20 rushes, 42 yards, TD

**Top receivers**

- TEN – Yancey Thigpen – 5 receptions, 68 yards
- JAC – Jimmy Smith – 6 receptions, 103 yards

With the Jaguars surging to their first AFC Central title they started Jamie Martin instead of Mark Brunell and clawed to a 10-0 lead but the Oilers scored thirteen straight points; Jonathan Quinn replaced Martin in the second half; he was intercepted at the Titans goal line but led a drive ending in a tying field goal with seven minutes to go. After an exchange of punts McNair in the final two and a half minutes completed three passes for 33 yards and ran three times for eighteen more and the winning Del Greco field goal.

==== Week 16: at Green Bay Packers ====
Week Sixteen: Tennessee Oilers at Green Bay Packers – Game summary

Quarter	1	2	3	4	Total
Oilers	0	7	7	8	**22**
**Packers**	14	7	3	6	**30**

at Lambeau Field, Green Bay, Wisconsin

- Date: December 20
- Game time: 1:00 p.m. CST
- Game weather: 25 °F (−4 °C)
- Game attendance: 59,888
- Referee: Bill Carollo
- TV announcers (CBS): Verne Lundquist & Randy Cross
- Box score

Game information

**First quarter**

- GB – Antonio Freeman 57-yard pass from Brett Favre (Ryan Longwell kick). Packers 7–0.
- GB – Antonio Freeman 68-yard pass from Brett Favre (Ryan Longwell kick). Packers 14–0.

**Second quarter**

- TEN – Derrick Mason 25-yard pass from Steve McNair (Al Del Greco kick). Packers 14–7.
- GB – Antonio Freeman 32-yard pass from Brett Favre (Ryan Longwell kick). Packers 21–7.

**Third quarter**

- GB – Ryan Longwell 38-yard field goal. Packers 24–7.
- TEN – Yancey Thigpen 30-yard pass from Steve McNair (Al Del Greco kick). Packers 24–14.

**Fourth quarter**

- GB – Ryan Longwell 40-yard field goal. Packers 27–14.
- GB – Ryan Longwell 40-yard field goal. Packers 30–14.
- TEN – Derrick Mason 3-yard pass from Steve McNair (Eddie George run). Packers 30–22.

**Top passers**

- TEN – Steve McNair – 29/49, 263 yards, 3 TD, INT
- GB – Brett Favre – 14/22, 253 yards, 3 TD

**Top rushers**

- TEN – Steve McNair – 9 rushes, 49 yards
- GB – Dorsey Levens – 26 rushes, 70 yards

**Top receivers**

- TEN – Yancey Thigpen – 8 receptions, 90 yards, TD
- GB – Antonio Freeman – 7 receptions, 186 yards, 3 TD

The Packers led wire to wire on three Brett Favre touchdowns winning 30-22 despite three touchdowns by Steve McNair. The Oilers’ inability to win outside the AFC Central (now just 1-6 outside the division) was thus looming as denying a playoff spot.

==== Week 17: vs Minnesota Vikings ====
Week Seventeen: Minnesota Vikings at Tennessee Oilers – Game summary

Quarter	1	2	3	4	Total
**Vikings**	2	6	15	3	**26**
Oilers	3	10	3	0	**16**

at Vanderbilt Stadium, Nashville, Tennessee

- Date: December 26
- Game time: 12:30 p.m. CST
- Game weather: 31 °F (−1 °C)
- Game attendance: 41,121
- Referee: Tom White
- TV announcers (Fox): Dick Stockton & Matt Millen
- Box score

Game information

**First quarter**

- MIN – Steve McNair intentional grounding in own end zone. Vikings 2–0.
- TEN – Al Del Greco 36-yard field goal. Oilers 3–2.

**Second quarter**

- MIN – Gary Anderson 39-yard field goal. Vikings 5–3.
- TEN – Al Del Greco 33-yard field goal. Oilers 6–5.
- TEN – Eddie George 2-yard run (Al Del Greco kick). Oilers 13–5.
- MIN – Gary Anderson 23-yard field goal. Oilers 13–8.

**Third quarter**

- MIN – Randy Moss 5-yard pass from Randall Cunningham (Randall Cunningham pass to Randy Moss). Vikings 16–13.
- TEN – Al Del Greco 45-yard field goal. Tied 16–16.
- MIN – Cris Carter 38-yard pass from Randall Cunningham (Gary Anderson kick). Vikings 23–16.

**Fourth quarter**

- MIN – Gary Anderson 30-yard field goal. Vikings 26–16.

**Top passers**

- MIN – Randall Cunningham – 23/35, 235 yards, 2 TD, INT
- TEN – Steve McNair – 16/33, 261 yards

**Top rushers**

- MIN – Robert Smith – 15 rushes, 73 yards
- TEN – Eddie George – 14 rushes, 54 yards, TD

**Top receivers**

- MIN – Cris Carter – 6 receptions, 78 yards, TD
- TEN – Jackie Harris – 4 receptions, 83 yards

The Oilers officially ended as such in a 26-16 loss to the 15-1 Vikings. The Oilers led 13-5 before Randall Cunningham erupted with two touchdown throws, securing Minnesota’s run to the NFC Central title and playoff bye, while leaving the Titans to rest and regroup for next season.

=== Standings ===
AFC Central
	W	L	T	PCT	PF	PA	STK
^{(3)} Jacksonville Jaguars	11	5	0	.688	392	338	W1
Tennessee Oilers	8	8	0	.500	330	320	L2
Pittsburgh Steelers	7	9	0	.438	263	303	L5
Baltimore Ravens	6	10	0	.375	269	335	W1
Cincinnati Bengals	3	13	0	.188	268	452	L1
