= KPBA =

KPBA may refer to:

- KPBA (FM), a radio station (99.3 FM) licensed to serve Pine Bluff, Arkansas, United States
- KDPX (FM), a radio station (101.3 FM) licensed to serve Pine Bluff, Arkansas, which held the call sign KPBA from 2015 to 2018
- KPBA (1270 AM), a defunct radio station (1270 AM) formerly licensed to serve Pine Bluff
- KYDE, a defunct radio station (1590 AM) formerly licensed to serve Pine Bluff, which held the call sign KPBA from 1957 to 1976
- KPBA ("El Chupacabra"), a fictional radio station in Reno 911!
