= 1999 Tennessee Titans season =

40th season in franchise history, renamed "Titans", first Super Bowl appearance

- Owner: Bud Adams
- General manager: Floyd Reese
- Head coach: Jeff Fisher
- Offensive coordinator: Les Steckel
- Defensive coordinator: Gregg Williams
- Home stadium: Adelphia Coliseum

Results
- Record: 13–3
- Division place: 2nd AFC Central
- Playoffs: Won Wild Card Playoffs (vs. Bills) 22–16; Won Divisional Playoffs (at Colts) 19–16; Won AFC Championship (at Jaguars) 33–14; Lost Super Bowl XXXIV (vs. Rams) 16–23
- Pro Bowlers: G Bruce Matthews; TE Frank Wycheck; RB Eddie George; DE Jevon Kearse

The 1999 Tennessee Titans season was the franchise's 40th season and their 30th in the National Football League (NFL). It was the first year for the team under the name "Titans", while the nickname "Oilers" was retired by the NFL. The Titans qualified for the playoffs for the first time since 1993, and their first since relocating from Houston, as well as their first playoff victory since 1991. They became the seventh Wild Card team to qualify for the Super Bowl. However, after defeating the Bills, Colts, and Jaguars in the postseason, they lost the Super Bowl to the St. Louis Rams, 23–16 on a famous last-second tackle made by Rams defender Mike Jones at the goal line that prevented Titans receiver Kevin Dyson from scoring a potential game-tying touchdown.

The highlight of the season was the Wild Card game against the Buffalo Bills, dubbed the Music City Miracle. In the game's closing seconds, Kevin Dyson caught a lateral on a kickoff and ran all the way down the sidelines for a touchdown. Also notable is the fact that the Titans were the only team to beat the Jaguars in 1999, as the latter finished 14–2 and lost both games to them, and lost the AFC Championship Game to the Titans as well. It was the franchise's first appearance in the AFC Championship Game in 20 years. The Titans also finished undefeated at home for the first time in franchise history.

With the sixteenth pick of the 1999 NFL draft, the Titans selected defensive end Jevon Kearse of Florida; he had his best years in Tennessee, being named to three consecutive Pro Bowls (1999–2001) and winning the NFL Defensive Rookie of the Year Award.

== Offseason ==
=== 1999 expansion draft ===
Titans selected during the expansion draft
| Pick | Name | Position | Expansion team |
|---|---|---|---|
| 10 | Lenoy Jones | Linebacker | Cleveland Browns |

=== NFL draft ===
1999 Tennessee Titans draft
| Round | Pick | Player | Position | College | Notes |
| 1 | 16 | Jevon Kearse * | Defensive end | Florida | |
| 2 | 52 | John Thornton | Defensive tackle | West Virginia | |
| 3 | 81 | Zach Piller | Guard | Florida | |
| 4 | 114 | Brad Ware | Defensive back | Auburn | |
| 4 | 117 | Donald Mitchell | Defensive back | SMU | |
| 5 | 151 | Kevin Daft | Quarterback | UC Davis | |
| 6 | 186 | Darran Hall | Wide receiver | Colorado State | |
| 7 | 222 | Phil Glover | Linebacker | Utah | |
Made roster * Made at least one Pro Bowl during career

== Personnel ==
=== Staff ===
1999 Tennessee Titans staff
| Front office: Founder/owner/chairman of the board/CEO – Bud Adams; President/chief operating officer – Jeff Diamond; Executive vice president/general manager – Floyd Reese; Director of player personnel – Rich Snead; Head coaches: Head coach – Jeff Fisher; Assistant head coach/running game – George Henshaw; Offensive coaches: Offensive coordinator – Les Steckel; Quarterbacks – Bart Andrus; Running backs – Sherman Smith; Wide receivers – Steve Walters; Offensive line – Mike Munchak | Defensive coaches: Defensive coordinator – Gregg Williams; Defensive line – Jim Washburn; Linebackers – O'Neill Gilbert; Defensive backs – Jerry Gray; Defensive assistant/quality control – Jim Schwartz; Special teams coaches: Special teams – Alan Lowry; Strength and conditioning: Strength and conditioning – Steve Watterson |

=== Roster ===
1999 Tennessee Titans roster
| Quarterbacks (QB): 13 Kevin Daft; 9 Steve McNair; 14 Neil O'Donnell; Running backs (RB): 27 Eddie George; 26 Spencer George; 41 Lorenzo Neal FB; 20 Rodney Thomas; Wide receivers (WR): 83 Isaac Byrd; 87 Kevin Dyson; 86 Joey Kent; 85 Derrick Mason; 81 Chris Sanders; 82 Yancey Thigpen; Tight ends (TE): 84 Larry Brown; 88 Jackie Harris; 80 Michael Roan; 89 Frank Wycheck | Offensive linemen (OL): 72 Brad Hopkins T; 66 Jason Layman G; 60 Kevin Long C; 76 Jason Mathews T; 74 Bruce Matthews C/G; 75 Benji Olson G; 71 Zach Piller G; 69 Jon Runyan T; Defensive linemen (DL): 91 Josh Evans DT; 97 Jason Fisk DT; 92 Henry Ford DE; 94 Mike Frederick DE; 99 Kenny Holmes DE; 96 Mike Jones DT; 90 Jevon Kearse DE; 95 Joe Salave'a DT; 78 John Thornton DT | Linebackers (LB): 58 Joe Bowden OLB; 59 Doug Colman MLB; 51 Greg Favors OLB; 54 Phil Glover MLB; 50 Terry Killens OLB; 55 Eddie Robinson OLB; 52 Barron Wortham MLB; Defensive backs (DB): 23 Blaine Bishop SS; 33 Anthony Dorsett FS; 24 Steve Jackson CB/S; 38 George McCullough CB; 30 Donald Mitchell CB; 35 Perry Phenix SS; 31 Marcus Robertson FS; 21 Samari Rolle CB; 37 Dainon Sidney CB; 25 Denard Walker CB; Special teams (ST): 3 Al Del Greco K; 15 Craig Hentrich P | Practice squad: 64 Keith Embray DE; 45 Garett Gould FB; 62 Craig Page C; 77 Rod Walker DT; 36 Brad Ware S; Reserve: 53 Jason Gamble G; 98 Pratt Lyons DT (NF-Inj.); 73 Scott Sanderson G (IR); 56 Dennis Stallings LB (IR); Rookies in italics 53 active, 4 reserve, 5 practice squad |

== Preseason ==
=== Schedule ===
| Week | Date | Opponent | Result | Record | Venue | Recap |
|---|---|---|---|---|---|---|
| 1 | August 15 | at Kansas City Chiefs | L 20–22 | 0–1 | Arrowhead Stadium | Recap |
| 2 | August 20 | at Arizona Cardinals | L 17–27 | 0–2 | Sun Devil Stadium | Recap |
| 3 | August 27 | Atlanta Falcons | W 17–3 | 1–2 | Adelphia Coliseum | Recap |
| 4 | September 2 | New Orleans Saints | L 11–12 | 1–3 | Adelphia Coliseum | Recap |

== Regular season ==
=== Schedule ===
| Week | Date | Opponent | Result | Record | Venue | Recap |
|---|---|---|---|---|---|---|
| 1 | September 12 | **Cincinnati Bengals** | **W** 36–35 | 1–0 | Adelphia Coliseum | Recap |
| 2 | September 19 | **Cleveland Browns** | **W** 26–9 | 2–0 | Adelphia Coliseum | Recap |
| 3 | September 26 | at **Jacksonville Jaguars** | **W** 20–19 | 3–0 | Alltel Stadium | Recap |
| 4 | October 3 | at San Francisco 49ers | **L** 22–24 | 3–1 | 3Com Park | Recap |
| 5 | October 10 | **Baltimore Ravens** | **W** 14–11 | 4–1 | Adelphia Coliseum | Recap |
| 6 | October 17 | at New Orleans Saints | **W** 24–21 | 5–1 | Louisiana Superdome | Recap |
| 7 | Bye | | | | | |
| 8 | October 31 | St. Louis Rams | **W** 24–21 | 6–1 | Adelphia Coliseum | Recap |
| 9 | November 7 | at Miami Dolphins | **L** 0–17 | 6–2 | Pro Player Stadium | Recap |
| 10 | November 14 | at **Cincinnati Bengals** | **W** 24–14 | 7–2 | Cinergy Field | Recap |
| 11 | November 21 | **Pittsburgh Steelers** | **W** 16–10 | 8–2 | Adelphia Coliseum | Recap |
| 12 | November 28 | at **Cleveland Browns** | **W** 33–21 | 9–2 | Cleveland Browns Stadium | Recap |
| 13 | December 5 | at **Baltimore Ravens** | **L** 14–41 | 9–3 | PSINet Stadium | Recap |
| 14 | December 9 | Oakland Raiders | **W** 21–14 | 10–3 | Adelphia Coliseum | Recap |
| 15 | December 19 | Atlanta Falcons | **W** 30–17 | 11–3 | Adelphia Coliseum | Recap |
| 16 | December 26 | **Jacksonville Jaguars** | **W** 41–14 | 12–3 | Adelphia Coliseum | Recap |
| 17 | January 2, 2000 | at **Pittsburgh Steelers** | **W** 47–36 | 13–3 | Three Rivers Stadium | Recap |
Note: Intra-division opponents are in **bold** text.

=== Standings ===
AFC Central
| | W | L | T | PCT | PF | PA | STK |
|---|---|---|---|---|---|---|---|
| ^{(1)} Jacksonville Jaguars | 14 | 2 | 0 | .875 | 396 | 217 | W1 |
| ^{(4)} Tennessee Titans | 13 | 3 | 0 | .813 | 392 | 324 | W4 |
| Baltimore Ravens | 8 | 8 | 0 | .500 | 324 | 277 | L1 |
| Pittsburgh Steelers | 6 | 10 | 0 | .375 | 317 | 320 | L1 |
| Cincinnati Bengals | 4 | 12 | 0 | .250 | 283 | 460 | L2 |
| Cleveland Browns | 2 | 14 | 0 | .125 | 217 | 437 | L6 |

=== Game summaries ===
==== Week 1 vs. Cincinnati Bengals ====
Tennessee Titans 36, Cincinnati Bengals 35

| Quarter | 1 | 2 | 3 | 4 | Total |
|---|---|---|---|---|---|
| Bengals | 7 | 14 | 8 | 6 | **35** |
| **Titans** | 14 | 12 | 0 | 10 | **36** |

at Adelphia Coliseum, Nashville, Tennessee

- Game time: 1:03 p.m. EDT/12:03 p.m. CDT
- Game weather: 89 °F (31.7 °C), sunny, wind 10 miles per hour (16 km/h; 8.7 kn)
- Game attendance: 65,272
- Referee: Mike Carey
- TV announcers (CBS): Don Criqui, Steve Tasker

In the team's inaugural game as the “Titans”, Steve McNair threw two touchdowns and ran in a third for a 26–15 lead with 2:55 left in the first half, but a Jeff Blake touchdown left the halftime score 26–21 Titans. The Bengals stormed to a 35–26 lead in the fourth before McNair connected with Eddie George for a 17-yard touchdown with 4:30 left in the fourth, then Al Del Greco kicked the game-winning 33-yard field goal of a 36–35 Titans final.

==== Week 2 vs. Cleveland Browns ====
Tennessee Titans 26, Cleveland Browns 9

| Quarter | 1 | 2 | 3 | 4 | Total |
|---|---|---|---|---|---|
| Browns | 0 | 3 | 6 | 0 | **9** |
| **Titans** | 2 | 14 | 3 | 7 | **26** |

at Adelphia Coliseum, Nashville, Tennessee

- Game time: 4:15 p.m. EDT/3:15 p.m. CDT
- Game weather: 86 °F (30 °C), sunny, wind 10 miles per hour (16 km/h; 8.7 kn)
- Game attendance: 65,904
- Referee: Ed Hochuli
- TV announcers (CBS): Bill Macatee, Beasley Reece

==== Week 3 at Jacksonville Jaguars ====
Tennessee Titans 20, Jacksonville Jaguars 19

| Quarter | 1 | 2 | 3 | 4 | Total |
|---|---|---|---|---|---|
| **Titans** | 0 | 0 | 7 | 13 | **20** |
| Jaguars | 3 | 0 | 14 | 2 | **19** |

at Alltel Stadium, Jacksonville, Florida

- Game time: 4:05 p.m. EDT/3:05 p.m. CDT
- Game weather: Rain 75 °F (23.9 °C), wind 9 miles per hour (14 km/h; 7.8 kn)
- Game attendance: 61,502
- Referee: Ron Winter
- TV announcers (CBS): Verne Lundquist, Dan Dierdorf

Neil O'Donnell was forced to start, and he threw a third-quarter touchdown to Eddie George, but an Aaron Beasley interception became a 35-yard Jaguars score and a 17–7 Jacksonville lead. O'Donnell rebounded with a fourth-quarter score to Michael Roan and a 20–19 Titans win as Tennessee surrendered a safety on the game's final play.

==== Week 4 at San Francisco 49ers ====
San Francisco 49ers 24, Tennessee Titans 22

| Quarter | 1 | 2 | 3 | 4 | Total |
|---|---|---|---|---|---|
| Titans | 3 | 7 | 3 | 9 | **22** |
| **49ers** | 0 | 14 | 0 | 10 | **24** |

at 3Com Park, San Francisco

- Game time: 4:15 p.m. EDT/1:15 p.m. PDT
- Game weather: 64 °F (17.8 °C), wind 5 miles per hour (8.0 km/h; 4.3 kn)
- Game attendance: 67,447
- Referee: Gerry Austin
- TV announcers (CBS): Kevin Harlan, Sam Wyche

Tennessee suffered its first loss of the year as Jeff Garcia ran in a one-yard touchdown, then connected with Terrell Owens in the fourth quarter. The Titans trailed 24–16 when O'Donnell hit Yancey Thigpen in the end zone with 2:48 left in regulation; the two-point try was stopped, however, and the Niners ran out the clock for a 24–22 Titans loss.

==== Week 5 vs. Baltimore Ravens ====
Tennessee Titans 14, Baltimore Ravens 11

| Quarter | 1 | 2 | 3 | 4 | Total |
|---|---|---|---|---|---|
| Ravens | 3 | 3 | 5 | 0 | **11** |
| **Titans** | 7 | 0 | 7 | 0 | **14** |

at Adelphia Coliseum, Nashville, Tennessee

- Game time: 4:15 p.m. EDT/3:15 p.m. CDT
- Game weather: 75 °F (23.9 °C), mostly cloudy, wind 9 miles per hour (14 km/h; 7.8 kn)
- Game attendance: 65,486
- Referee: Dick Hantak
- TV announcers (CBS): Bill Macatee, Beasley Reece

The Titans committed the highest penalty yardage in league history to that point with fifteen fouls eating up 212 yards; the Ravens, under first-year coach Brian Billick, didn't fare much better with nine penalties for 81 yards. Titans starter Neil O'Donnell completed 24 of 35 passes for 216 yards and a 27-yard score to Yancey Thigpen while Eddie George was limited to just 55 rushing yards.

==== Week 8 vs. St. Louis Rams ====
Tennessee Titans 24, St. Louis Rams 21

| Quarter | 1 | 2 | 3 | 4 | Total |
|---|---|---|---|---|---|
| Rams | 0 | 0 | 14 | 7 | **21** |
| **Titans** | 21 | 0 | 3 | 0 | **24** |

at Adelphia Coliseum, Nashville, Tennessee

- Game time: 1:03 p.m. EDT/12:03 p.m. CDT
- Game weather: 78 °F (25.6 °C), cloudy, wind 10 miles per hour (16 km/h; 8.7 kn)
- Game attendance: 66,415
- Referee: Bob McElwee
- TV announcers (FOX): Dick Stockton, Matt Millen, Pam Oliver

In a Super Bowl XXXIV precursor, Steve McNair threw two touchdowns and ran in a third in the first quarter, then the Titans sweated out three Kurt Warner touchdown throws for a 24–21 win. The Rams coughed up three fumbles to the Titans.

==== Week 11 vs. Pittsburgh Steelers ====
Tennessee Titans 16, Pittsburgh Steelers 10

| Quarter | 1 | 2 | 3 | 4 | Total |
|---|---|---|---|---|---|
| Steelers | 7 | 0 | 0 | 3 | **10** |
| **Titans** | 14 | 0 | 2 | 0 | **16** |

at Adelphia Coliseum, Nashville, Tennessee

- Game time: 1:03 p.m. EST/12:03 p.m. CST
- Game weather: 66 °F (18.9 °C), cloudy, wind 10 miles per hour (16 km/h; 8.7 kn)
- Game attendance: 66,619
- Referee: Mike Carey
- TV announcers (CBS): Don Criqui, Steve Tasker

==== Week 14 vs. Oakland Raiders ====
Tennessee Titans 21, Oakland Raiders 14

| Quarter | 1 | 2 | 3 | 4 | Total |
|---|---|---|---|---|---|
| Raiders | 0 | 0 | 7 | 7 | **14** |
| **Titans** | 0 | 0 | 7 | 14 | **21** |

at Adelphia Coliseum, Nashville, Tennessee

- Game time: 8:20 p.m. EST
- Game weather: 60 °F (15.6 °C), cloudy, wind 13 miles per hour (21 km/h; 11 kn)
- Game attendance: 66,357
- Referee: Phil Luckett
- TV announcers (ESPN): Mike Patrick, Paul Maguire, Joe Theismann, Solomon Wilcots

==== Week 15 vs. Atlanta Falcons ====
Tennessee Titans 30, Atlanta Falcons 17

| Quarter | 1 | 2 | 3 | 4 | Total |
|---|---|---|---|---|---|
| Falcons | 7 | 7 | 3 | 0 | **17** |
| **Titans** | 14 | 6 | 0 | 10 | **30** |

at Adelphia Coliseum, Nashville, Tennessee

- Game time: 12:03 p.m. EST
- Game weather: 57 °F (13.9 °C), cloudy, wind 3 miles per hour (4.8 km/h; 2.6 kn)
- Game attendance: 66,357
- Referee: Bill Carollo
- TV announcers (FOX): Kenny Albert, Tim Green, Mike Ferreri

==== Week 16 vs. Jacksonville Jaguars ====
Tennessee Titans 41, Jacksonville Jaguars 14

| Quarter | 1 | 2 | 3 | 4 | Total |
|---|---|---|---|---|---|
| Jaguars | 0 | 7 | 7 | 0 | **14** |
| **Titans** | 7 | 17 | 14 | 3 | **41** |

at Adelphia Coliseum, Nashville, Tennessee

- Game time: 12:03 p.m. EST
- Game weather: 51 °F (10.6 °C), cloudy, wind 13 miles per hour (21 km/h; 11 kn)
- Game attendance: 66,641
- Referee: Bill Carollo
- TV announcers (CBS): Kevin Harlan, Sam Wyche

The Jaguars had beaten every team on their 1999 slate except the Titans, but the Titans finished a season sweep with a 41–14 rout. Steve McNair exploded to five touchdowns and 328 passing yards while Eddie George ran wild with 102 rushing yards. The Titans defense limited Jaguars quarterbacks Mark Brunell and Jay Fiedler to 196 combined yards and three interceptions.

==== Week 17 at Pittsburgh Steelers ====
Tennessee Titans 47, Pittsburgh Steelers 36

| Quarter | 1 | 2 | 3 | 4 | Total |
|---|---|---|---|---|---|
| **Titans** | 7 | 24 | 9 | 7 | **47** |
| Steelers | 7 | 0 | 22 | 7 | **36** |

at Three Rivers Stadium, Pittsburgh, Pennsylvania

- Game time: 4:15 p.m. EST
- Game weather: 70 °F (21.1 °C), wind 23 miles per hour (37 km/h; 20 kn)
- Game attendance: 48,025
- Referee: Tom White
- TV announcers (CBS): Don Criqui, Steve Tasker

The Titans erupted to six touchdowns, a 42-yard Al Del Greco field goal, and a safety after sacking Mike Tomczak in the Pittsburgh end zone for a 47–36 triumph. Jevon Kearse and Denard Walker scored off Steeler fumbles while Steve McNair and former Steeler Neil O'Donnell combined for 203 passing yards and three touchdowns. Tomczak had two touchdown throws while Jerome Bettis and Richard Huntley each ran in a Pittsburgh touchdown.

== Playoffs ==
=== AFC Wild Card ===
Tennessee Titans 22, Buffalo Bills 16

| Quarter | 1 | 2 | 3 | 4 | Total |
|---|---|---|---|---|---|
| Bills | 0 | 0 | 7 | 9 | 16 |
| Titans | 0 | 12 | 0 | 10 | 22 |

at Adelphia Coliseum, Nashville, Tennessee

- Game time: 12:30 p.m. EST/11:30 a.m. CST
- Game weather: 58 °F (14.4 °C), cloudy
- Game attendance: 66,672
- Referee: Phil Luckett
- TV announcers (ABC): Mike Patrick (play-by-play), Joe Theismann and Paul Maguire (color commentators), and Solomon Wilcots (sideline reporter)

==== Music City Miracle ====
The Music City Miracle is a famous play in the NFL Wild Card Playoffs involving the Titans and Buffalo Bills that took place on January 8, 2000 (following the 1999 regular season) at Adelphia Coliseum in Nashville, Tennessee.

Going into the game, Bills coach Wade Phillips created a stir by starting quarterback Rob Johnson, rather than Doug Flutie, who had started 15 games, and who had led the team to the playoffs. Late in the fourth quarter, the stage was set for an exciting finish. Tennessee received the ball with 6:15 remaining. Titans receiver Isaac Byrd’s 16-yard punt return and five carries from Eddie George for 17 yards set up a wobbly 36-yard field goal by kicker Al Del Greco. The Titans took a 15–13 lead with 1:48 to go.

On the ensuing drive, with no timeouts remaining, Bills quarterback Johnson led the Bills on a five-play, 37-yard drive to the Titans' 24-yard line. On the last two plays from scrimmage, Johnson played with only one shoe on, as he had lost one during a scramble, and had no time to put it back on, with the clock running out. With only 16 seconds remaining in the game, Steve Christie, the Bills' kicker, made a 41-yard field goal to put Buffalo in the lead, 16–15.

Moments later, Christie kicked off, and Titans fullback Lorenzo Neal received. Neal handed the ball off to Titans tight end Frank Wycheck, who then lateraled the ball across the field to another Titans player, Kevin Dyson, who then ran down the sidelines for a 75-yard touchdown. The play was named Home Run Throwback by the Titans and was developed by Special Teams Coordinator Alan Lowry.

- Official review

Per the instant replay rules, the play was reviewed by referee Phil Luckett since it was uncertain if the ball had been a forward pass, which is illegal on a kickoff return. However, the call on the field was upheld as a touchdown, and the Titans won the game 22–16. After the game, however, many Bills players and fans continued to insist that it was indeed an illegal forward pass.

=== AFC Divisional Playoff ===
Tennessee Titans 19, Indianapolis Colts 16

| Quarter | 1 | 2 | 3 | 4 | Total |
|---|---|---|---|---|---|
| Titans | 0 | 6 | 7 | 6 | 19 |
| Colts | 3 | 6 | 0 | 7 | 16 |

at RCA Dome, Indianapolis

- Game time: 4:00 p.m. EST
- Game weather: Played indoors, domed stadium
- Game attendance: 60,314
- Referee: Johnny Grier
- TV announcers (CBS): Greg Gumbel (play-by-play), Phil Simms (color commentator), and Armen Keteyian (sideline reporter)

Although the Indianapolis Colts, behind second year quarterback Peyton Manning, had posted some gaudy numbers (3rd in points scored compared to Tennessee's 7th) en route to a sterling 13–3 regular season record, the upstart Titans paid them little respect. Running back Eddie George rushed for a team playoff-record 162 yards, including a 68-yard touchdown, to help lead the Titans to victory. Manning completed only 19 of 43 passes in the loss for the Colts.

=== AFC Championship game ===
Tennessee Titans 33, Jacksonville Jaguars 14

| Quarter | 1 | 2 | 3 | 4 | Total |
|---|---|---|---|---|---|
| Titans | 7 | 3 | 16 | 7 | 33 |
| Jaguars | 7 | 7 | 0 | 0 | 14 |

at Alltel Stadium, Jacksonville, Florida

- Game time: 12:30 p.m. EST
- Game weather: 75 °F (23.9 °C), partly cloudy
- Game attendance: 75,206
- Referee: Bernie Kukar
- TV announcers (CBS): Greg Gumbel (play-by-play), Phil Simms (color commentator), Armen Keteyian, and Bonnie Bernstein (sideline reporters)

The Jacksonville Jaguars had been one of the NFL's best teams in the 1999 season; they were 6th in scoring and first in fewest points allowed while pacing the AFC with a 14–2 record. However, both of those losses came at the hands of their opponents in the AFC Championship game, the Tennessee Titans. The Titans would prove up to the task of beating their division rival once again as the Titans scored a resounding 33–14 victory; the game was at times a chaotic affair as the Titans forced six turnovers and an end zone sack for a safety, all despite giving up four turnovers themselves; the Jaguars also committed nine penalties for 100 yards. The Titans advanced to the first Super Bowl in team history.

=== Super Bowl XXXIV ===
The Titans took over the ball at their own 10-yard line with 1:54 left in the game after committing a holding penalty on the ensuing kickoff. McNair started out the drive with a pair of completions to Mason and Wycheck for gains of 9 and 7 yards to reach the 28-yard line. Then after throwing an incompletion, defensive back Dre' Bly’s 15-yard facemask penalty while tackling McNair on a 12-yard scramble gave the Titans a first down at the St. Louis 45-yard line. On the next play, St. Louis was penalized 5 yards for being offsides, moving the ball to the 40-yard line with 59 seconds left. McNair then ran for 2 yards, followed by a 7-yard completion to wide receiver Kevin Dyson. Three plays later, with the Titans facing 3rd down and 5 to go, McNair was hit by two Rams' defenders, but he escaped and completed a 16-yard pass to Dyson to gain a first down at the Rams 10-yard line. Tennessee then used up their final timeout with just 6 seconds left in the game, giving them a chance for one last play. McNair threw a short pass to Kevin Dyson down the middle, which looked certain to tie up the game, until Rams linebacker Mike Jones tackled Dyson at the one-yard line as time expired. Dyson tried to stretch his arm and the football across the goal line, but he had already gone down, so it was too late. This final play has gone down in NFL history as simply "The Tackle".

After the game, many sports writers commented on Warner’s rise from an unknown backup to a Super Bowl MVP, but Warner himself wasn't impressed by it. "How can you be in awe of something that you expect yourself to do?" Warner pointed out. "People think this season is the first time I touched a football; they don't realize I've been doing this for years – just not on this level, because I never got the chance. Sure, I had my tough times, but you don't sit there and say, 'Wow, I was stocking groceries five years ago, and look at me now.' You don't think about it, and when you do achieve something, you know luck has nothing to do with it."

==== Scoring summary ====
- STL – FG: Jeff Wilkins 27 yards 3–0 STL
- STL – FG: Jeff Wilkins 29 yards 6–0 STL
- STL – FG: Jeff Wilkins 28 yards 9–0 STL
- STL – TD: Torry Holt, 9-yard pass from Warner (Jeff Wilkins kick) 16–0 STL
- TEN – TD: Eddie George 1-yard run (2-pt conv: pass failed) 16–6 STL
- TEN – TD: Eddie George 2-yard run (Al Del Greco kick) 16–13 STL
- TEN – FG: Al Del Greco 43 yards 16–16 tie
- STL – TD: Isaac Bruce 73-yard pass from Kurt Warner (Jeff Wilkins kick) 23–16 STL
