= Jason Fisk =

American football player (born 1972)

No. 72, 97, 92, 95, 96
- Position: Defensive tackle

Personal information
- Born: September 4, 1972 (age 54); Davis, California, U.S.
- Listed height: 6 ft 3 in (1.91 m)
- Listed weight: 295 lb (134 kg)

Career information
- High school: Davis
- College: Stanford
- NFL draft: 1995: 7th round, 243rd overall pick

Career history
- Minnesota Vikings (1995–1998); Tennessee Titans (1999–2001); San Diego Chargers (2002–2004); Cleveland Browns (2005); St. Louis Rams (2006)

Awards and highlights
- Second-team All-Pac-10 (1994)

Career NFL statistics
- Tackles: 394
- Sacks: 19
- Forced fumbles: 4
- Interceptions: 3
- Stats at Pro Football Reference

Jason Fisk (born September 4, 1972) is an American former professional football player who was a defensive tackle in the National Football League (NFL). He played high school football at Davis High School, and college football for the Stanford Cardinal, lettering four years. He was a member of the Delta Tau Delta fraternity and earned degrees in biology and psychology while at Stanford.

== Career ==
=== Professional career ===
Fisk was selected by the Minnesota Vikings with the 35th pick in the seventh round (243rd out of 249 overall) of the 1995 NFL draft. He played for the Vikings (1995–1998), Tennessee Titans (1999–2001), San Diego Chargers (2002–2004), Cleveland Browns (2005) and St. Louis Rams (2006). While with the Titans, he played in Super Bowl XXXIV, where he recorded a sack of MVP Kurt Warner. Fisk retired following the 2006 season.

=== Coaching career ===
Fisk previously coached for his high school football team, the Davis High School Blue Devils, and then coached at UC Davis. He is currently a science teacher at Chartwell High School in Seaside, California.

== NFL career statistics ==
Legend
	Led the league
**Bold**	Career high

=== Regular season ===
Year	Team	Games		Tackles				Interceptions				Fumbles			
Year	Team	GP	GS	Comb	Solo	Ast	Sck	Int	Yds	TD	Lng	FF	FR	Yds	TD
1995	MIN	8	0	0	0	0	0.0	0	0	0	0	0	0	0	0
1996	MIN	16	6	31	22	9	1.0	**1**	0	0	0	0	**1**	0	0
1997	MIN	16	10	28	20	8	3.0	**1**	1	0	1	**1**	**1**	0	0
1998	MIN	16	0	17	12	5	1.5	0	0	0	0	**1**	**1**	0	0
1999	TEN	16	16	48	35	13	**4.0**	**1**	**17**	0	**17**	0	0	0	0
2000	TEN	15	15	40	30	10	2.0	0	0	0	0	**1**	0	0	0
2001	TEN	16	16	42	26	**16**	2.5	0	0	0	0	**1**	**1**	0	0
2002	SD	16	13	38	28	10	3.0	0	0	0	0	0	0	0	0
2003	SD	16	16	**51**	**41**	10	1.0	0	0	0	0	0	**1**	0	0
2004	SD	15	1	30	19	11	1.0	0	0	0	0	0	0	0	0
2005	CLE	16	14	39	23	**16**	0.0	0	0	0	0	0	0	0	0
2006	STL	16	0	30	28	2	0.0	0	0	0	0	0	0	0	0
		182	107	394	284	110	19.0	3	18	0	17	4	5	0	0

=== Postseason ===
Year	Team	Games		Tackles				Interceptions				Fumbles			
Year	Team	GP	GS	Comb	Solo	Ast	Sck	Int	Yds	TD	Lng	FF	FR	Yds	TD
1996	MIN	1	1	**8**	**8**	0	0.0	0	0	0	0	0	0	0	0
1997	MIN	2	0	2	2	0	1.0	0	0	0	0	0	0	0	0
1998	MIN	2	0	2	1	1	2.0	0	0	0	0	0	0	0	0
1999	TEN	4	4	**8**	4	**4**	**2.5**	0	0	0	0	0	**1**	0	0
2000	TEN	1	1	2	2	0	1.0	0	0	0	0	0	0	0	0
2004	SD	1	0	6	3	3	0.0	0	0	0	0	0	0	0	0
		11	6	28	20	8	6.5	0	0	0	0	0	1	0	0

== Personal life ==
Fisk is married with three children. His son Tucker is a tight end for the Los Angeles Chargers.
