= Davis Senior High School (California) =

Public high school in California, United States

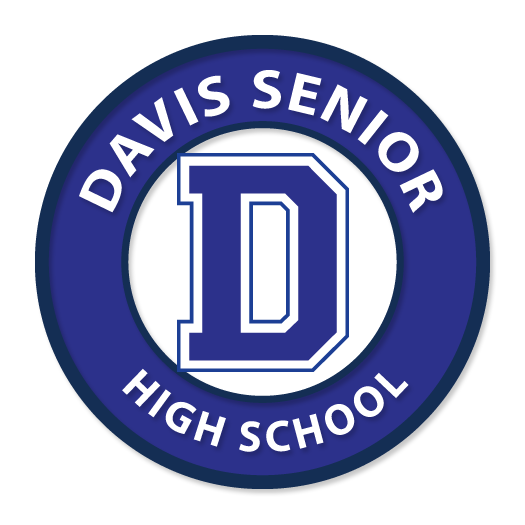

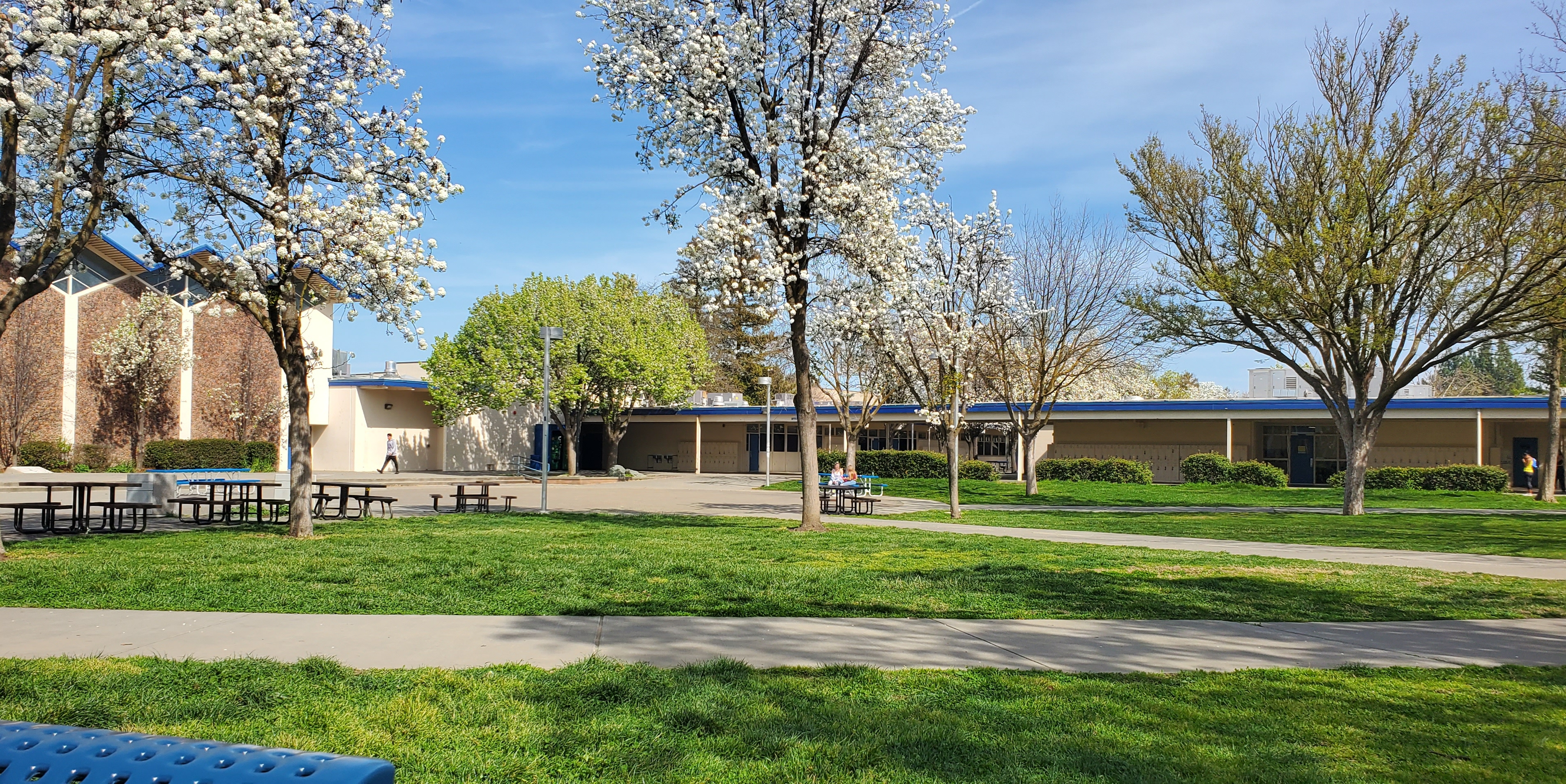
- The quad at DSHS

Location
- 315 West 14th Street; Davis, California 95616; United States; 38.557°N 121.751°W

Information
- Other name: Davis High
- Type: Public secondary school
- Established
- School district: Davis Joint Unified School District
- NCES District ID: 0610620
- NCES School ID: 061062001176
- Principal: Bryce Geigle
- Staff: 84
- Grades: 10–12
- Enrollment: 1,789 (2023–2024)
  - Grade 10: 604
  - Grade 11: 580
  - Grade 12: 605
- Average class size: 28
- Language: English
- Campus type: Suburban
- Colors: Blue and White
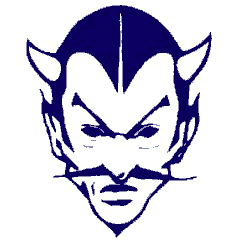
- Mascot: Blue Devil
- Team name: Blue Devils
- USNWR ranking: 824
- Newspaper: www.bluedevilhub.com
- Website: dshs.djusd.net

Davis Senior High School (also known as Davis High, DHS, or DSHS) is one of four high schools located in Davis, California. DHS is a WASC accredited, 3-year, public comprehensive high school covering grades 10–12. The campus opened its current location in 1961; the previous high school location is now Davis City Hall. Enrollment for school year 2017–2018 was 1,749 students. The school's mascot is the Blue Devil, from the nickname for the popular WWI French Les Chasseurs Alpins Army Division.

== Academics ==
- The average SAT score at Davis High in 2018 was 1778 out of 2400 in the 2015–2016 school year.
- Davis High offers 22 Advanced Placement Program courses, with 93.2% of test takers earning a passing grade of 3 or above in 2016.
- 9 students were named National Merit Scholar semifinalists in 2018.
- Student rankings are not maintained.

== Demographics ==
White	Hispanic	Asian	African American	Pacific Islander	American Indian	Two or More Races
55%	18%	20%	2%	0.1%	0.4%	5%

According to U.S. News & World Report in 2016, 45% of Davis Senior's student body is minority with 15% of the student body coming from an economically disadvantaged household, determined by student eligibility for California's Reduced-price meal program.

== Athletics ==
Davis High School is a Division I member of the CIF Sac-Joaquin Section's Delta League. The school has earned 143 team championships as of 2018, more than any other team in the section. They have more titles in boys' and girls' water polo, girls' swimming, and girls' cross country than any other team in the section as of 2018.

=== Cross Country ===
In the 2006–2007 school year, the Davis High boys' cross-country team finished third in Division I at the California State Meet, the best result ever recorded at the state meet by a Davis High cross-country team. They narrowly missed a bid to the national championships. In the 2007–2008 school year, Laurynne Chetelat, a Davis High senior on the girls' team, won the Division I race at the State Meet. Continuing the winning tradition established in the middle of the decade, both the boys' and girls' cross country teams won Sac-Joaquin Section Championships in 2008, led by the strong performances of standouts Matt Petersen and Christine Bowlus. Matt Petersen went on to complete one of Davis High's most impressive performances at the California Cross Country State Meet, completing the 5K course in 15:17 and placing 7th. In 2013, Fiona O'Keeffe, a sophomore on the Davis High girls' team, won the Division I State Meet race. As a junior in 2014, O'Keeffe successfully defended her title. Both years she went on to compete at Nike Cross Nationals and placed 4th in 2013 as well as in 2014. In 2015 and 2016, The team qualified for Nike Cross Nationals after consecutive 2nd-place finishes at the State Meet. In 2016, Olivia O'Keeffe claimed the individual Division 1 State Title, following in her sister's footsteps. They later went on to mirror their performance once again as they earned runner-up honors at Nike Cross Nationals both years. Also in 2016, Michael Vernau placed second at the Division One State Meet after running 14:56, one of the fastest times in meet history.

=== Track and Field ===
Davis athletes have historically performed well at both the Sac-Joaquin Section and CIF State Meets. In 2008, Laurynne Chetelat followed up her state champion cross country season with a stellar season on the track, finishing second in the 3200 meter run at the State Meet Finals to Jordan Hasay with a time of 9:52.51. Fiona O'Keeffe won the 3200m State Championship in 2016, as well as placing second in 2015.

=== Swimming ===
The Davis High women's swim team has a rich history, with notable alumni, including past and current members of USA Swimming's National Team. More recently, in 2018 the girls won their twentieth section title, and went on to the CIF State Meet. There the 200 Medley Relay team, made up of Zoe Cosgrove, Natalie Bercutt, Mia Motekaitis and Cody Hargadon, won the state title and took the state record with them. The relay was fourth in the nation and received NICSA All-America Status.

Davis High's principal athletic rivals are Woodland High School, Elk Grove High School, and Jesuit High School.

== Events ==
On May 4, 1983, Vietnamese-American student Thong Hy Huynh was stabbed to death by James “Jay” Pierman on campus after Huynh was coming to the aid of a friend who was being taunted by a group of white students. The student who fatally stabbed Huynh was sentenced to 6 years in the California Youth Authority.

In July 2012, SOLARGUARD solar panels were installed over the main student parking lot at Davis Senior High School. The total consumption (kWh) and total output (kWh) is tracked by SolarCity, a California solar energy company.

== Notable alumni ==
This is a partial list of notable alumni of Davis Senior High School.

=== Sports ===
- Jalil Anibaba - Class of 2007 - professional soccer player
- Eric Beavers - Class of 1982 - professional football player, University of Nevada quarterback
- Nate Boyden - Class of 2001 - professional soccer player for the Seattle Sounders.
- Steve Brown (baseball) - Class of 1974 - major league baseball player, pitcher for California Angels, pitcher for UC Davis Aggies
- Ron Bryant - professional baseball player, pitcher for San Francisco Giants
- Joe Chambers - Class of 2001, wheelchair basketball player
- Gerad Christian-Lichtenhan – Class of 2020 – college football offensive lineman
- Denise Curry - Class of 1977- basketball player, all-time leading scorer and rebounder at UCLA, gold medalist at 1984 Summer Olympics, played nine years professionally and was elected to Basketball Hall of Fame
- Malachi Davis - Class of 1996 - ran in 400-meter and 4x400-meter at 2004 Summer Olympics and 2005 World Championships in Athletics – Men's 4 × 400 metres relay for United Kingdom team
- Maya Doms - soccer player
- Jason Fisk - Class of 1990 - twelve-year NFL defensive tackle, played in Super Bowl XXXIV
- Brendan Gregg - distance runner
- Ryan Kreidler - Class of 2016 - MLB player for the Detroit Tigers. Played college baseball at UCLA from 2017 to 2019
- Gina Miles - equestrian silver medalist in individual eventing at 2008 Summer Olympics
- Fiona O'Keeffe (born 1998) – American long-distance runner
- Thretton Palamo - Class of 2006 - professional rugby player
- Sam Reynolds - Class of 2000- professional soccer player Miami FC, Toronto FC
- Dave Scott - triathlete, six-time Ironman triathlon world champion
- Chelsea Sodaro - Currently a professional triathlete won the Ironman World Championship in 2022. Ran as a professional runner, winning the USA 10 km road championships in 2012 as well as USATF indoor championships in the 3000m.
- Nick Watney - Class of 1997- PGA Tour golfer
- Craig Wilson - professional water polo goalie, US Olympian in 1984, 1988, and 1992
- Paul Wulff - football assistant coach with California State University, Sacramento and San Francisco 49ers, former head coach at Washington State
- Tucker Fisk - Class of 2017 - football player for the Los Angeles Chargers

=== Entertainment ===
- Sara Albert - Class of 2001 - contestant on America's Next Top Model , Cycle 6. One of the final 4 contestants.
- Elinor Armer - Class of 1957 - composer, performer, and music educator
- Butterscotch - Class of 2006 - reached final round of America's Got Talent as beatboxer, singer, pianist (performed for DHS in early 2008)
- Cayucas (Ben and Zach Yudin), - Class of 2000 - Indie pop duo.
- Tony Fields - Class of 1977 - Broadway performer, played Alan DeLuca in 1985 movie version of A Chorus Line
- Michael Franti - musician and peace activist
- Anna Holmes - founder of the Gawker Media owned website Jezebel
- Hasan Minhaj - Class of 2003 - Indian-American comedian; co-creator and host of Netflix show Patriot Act with Hasan Minhaj; former correspondent for The Daily Show
- Paul Scheuring - Class of 1987 - creator and executive producer of Prison Break (Fox)
- Cole Stratton - co-founder of SF Sketchfest, San Francisco Comedy Festival, co-host of Pop My Culture Podcast on Nerdist network

=== Science ===
- Carol Greider - recipient of Nobel Prize for Physiology or Medicine (2009)
- David Valentine - Class of 1991 - environmental scientist, featured in the documentary Out of Plain Sight
- Brian Nosek - social-cognitive psychologist, co-founder and Director Center for Open Science

=== Other ===
- Elle Bisgaard-Church (born 1990/1991) - political adviser
- David Daleiden - anti-abortion activist
- Gabe Newell - co-founder of Valve
