= Aric Morris =

American football player (born 1977)

No. 28, 29
- Position: Safety

Personal information
- Born: July 22, 1977 (age 49); Winston-Salem, North Carolina, U.S.

Career information
- High school: Berkley (Berkley, Michigan)
- College: Michigan State
- NFL draft: 2000: 5th round, 135th overall pick

Career history
- Tennessee Titans (2000–2002); New England Patriots (2003)

Awards and highlights
- Super Bowl champion (XXXVIII); Second-team All-Big Ten (1999)

Career NFL statistics
- Tackles: 96
- Interceptions: 1
- Sacks: 1.5
- Stats at Pro Football Reference

Aric Termain Morris (born July 22, 1977) is an American former professional football player who was a safety in the National Football League (NFL). He played college football for the Michigan State Spartans and was selected by the Tennessee Titans in the fifth round of the 2000 NFL draft. He played four seasons in the NFL for the Titans and New England Patriots. Morris played four games during the Patriots' 2003 season which culminated in them winning Super Bowl XXXVIII.

Morris played high school football at Berkley High School in Berkley, Michigan.

== NFL career statistics ==
Legend
**Bold**	Career high

=== Regular season ===
Year	Team	Games		Tackles					Interceptions					Fumbles			
Year	Team	GP	GS	Cmb	Solo	Ast	Sck	TFL	Int	Yds	TD	Lng	PD	FF	FR	Yds	TD
2000	TEN	15	0	12	11	1	0.0	0	0	0	0	0	0	0	**1**	0	0
2001	TEN	**16**	**10**	**51**	**36**	**15**	**1.5**	**3**	0	0	0	0	**2**	0	0	0	0
2002	TEN	**16**	0	25	20	5	0.0	1	0	0	0	0	0	0	0	0	0
2003	NWE	4	0	8	6	2	0.0	0	**1**	**33**	0	**33**	1	0	0	0	0
Career		51	10	96	73	23	1.5	4	1	33	0	33	3	0	1	0	0

=== Playoffs ===
Year	Team	Games		Tackles					Interceptions					Fumbles			
Year	Team	GP	GS	Cmb	Solo	Ast	Sck	TFL	Int	Yds	TD	Lng	PD	FF	FR	Yds	TD
2000	TEN	1	0	1	1	0	0.0	0	0	0	0	0	0	0	0	0	0
2002	TEN	**2**	0	**8**	**5**	**3**	0.0	0	0	0	0	0	0	0	0	0	0
Career		3	0	9	6	3	0.0	0	0	0	0	0	0	0	0	0	0
