= 1996 All-Pacific-10 Conference football team =

The 1996 All-Pacific-10 Conference football team consists of American football players chosen by various organizations for All-Pacific-10 Conference teams for the 1996 Pacific-10 Conference football season.

== Offensive selections ==
=== Quarterbacks ===
- Jake Plummer, Arizona St. (Coaches-1)
- Pat Barnes, California (Coaches-2)

=== Running backs ===
- Corey Dillon, Washington (Coaches-1)
- Terry Battle, Arizona St. (Coaches-1)
- Michael Black, Washington St. (Coaches-2)
- Skip Hicks, UCLA (Coaches-2)

=== Wide receivers ===
- Keith Poole, Arizona St. (Coaches-1)
- Bobby Shaw, California (Coaches-1)
- Jerome Pathon, Washington (Coaches-2)
- Damon Griffin, Oregon (Coaches-2)

=== Tight ends ===
- Tony Gonzalez, California (Coaches-1)
- John Allred, USC (Coaches-2)

=== Offensive linemen ===
- Scott Sanderson, Washington St. (Coaches-1)
- Juan Roque, Arizona St. (Coaches-1)
- Tarik Glenn, California (Coaches-1)
- Olin Kreutz, Washington (Coaches-1)
- Benji Olson, Washington (Coaches-1)
- Brad Badger, Stanford (Coaches-2)
- Paul Wiggins, Oregon (Coaches-2)
- Kyle Murphy, Arizona St. (Coaches-2)
- Frank Middleton, Arizona (Coaches-2)
- Mark Gregg, Oregon (Coaches-2)

== Defensive selections ==
=== Defensive linemen ===
- Jason Chorak, Washington (Coaches-1)
- Derrick Rodgers, Arizona St. (Coaches-1)
- Darrell Russell, USC (Coaches-1)
- Kailee Wong, Stanford (Coaches-1)
- Joe Salave'a, Arizona (Coaches-2)
- Brandon Whiting, California (Coaches-2)
- Dorian Boose, Washington St. (Coaches-2)
- David Richie, Washington (Coaches-2)

=== Linebackers ===
- Ink Aleaga, Washington (Coaches-1)
- James Darling, Washington St. (Coaches-1)
- Sammy Knight, USC (Coaches-1)
- Chris Draft, Stanford (Coaches-2)
- Pat Tillman, Arizona St. (Coaches-2)
- Chester Burnett, Arizona (Coaches-2)
- John Fiala, Washington (Coaches-2)

=== Defensive backs ===
- Daylon McCutcheon, USC (Coaches-1)
- Kenny Wheaton, Oregon (Coaches-1)
- Chris McAlister, Arizona (Coaches-1)
- Tony Parrish, Washington (Coaches-1)
- Marc Williams, Oregon St. (Coaches-2)
- Shad Hinchen, Washington St. (Coaches-2)
- Mitchell Freedman, Arizona St. (Coaches-2)
- Abdul McCullough, UCLA (Coaches-2)

== Special teams ==
=== Placekickers ===
- Bjorn Merten, UCLA (Coaches-1)
- Ryan Longwell, California (Coaches-2)

=== Punters ===
- Ryan Longwell, California (Coaches-1)
- Matt Peyton, Arizona (Coaches-2)

=== Return specialists/All purpose ===
- Shawn Tims, Washington St. (Coaches-1)
- Armon Williams, Arizona (Coaches-1)
- Jerome Pathon, Washington (Coaches-2)
- Marques Hairston, Washington (Coaches-2)

== Key ==
Coaches = selected by the conference coaches

== See also ==
- 1996 College Football All-America Team
