= Samari Rolle =

American football player (born 1976)

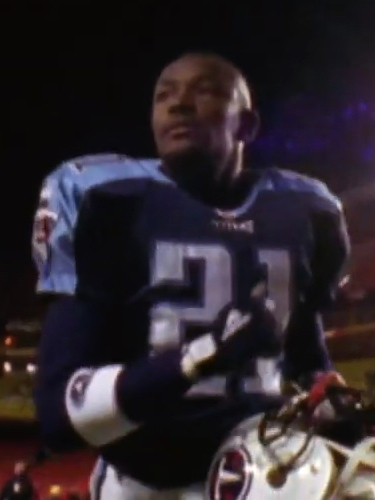
- Rolle with the Tennessee Titans in 2000

No. 21, 22
- Position: Cornerback

Personal information
- Born: August 10, 1976 (age 50); Miami, Florida, U.S.
- Listed height: 6 ft 0 in (1.83 m)
- Listed weight: 175 lb (79 kg)

Career information
- High school: Miami Beach Senior (Miami Beach, Florida)
- College: Florida State
- NFL draft: 1998: 2nd round, 46th overall pick

Career history
- Tennessee Oilers / Titans (1998–2004); Baltimore Ravens (2005–2009)

Awards and highlights
- First-team All-Pro (2000); Pro Bowl (2000); First-team All-ACC (1997)

Career NFL statistics
- Tackles: 435
- Sacks: 9.5
- Forced fumbles: 4
- Fumble recoveries: 8
- Interceptions: 31
- Defensive touchdowns: 2
- Stats at Pro Football Reference

Samari Toure Rolle (born August 10, 1976) is an American former professional football player who was a cornerback in the National Football League (NFL). He played college football for the Florida State Seminoles and was selected by the Tennessee Oilers in the second round of the 1998 NFL draft.

Rolle also played for the Baltimore Ravens. He was selected to the Pro Bowl in 2000.

== Early life ==
Rolle attended Miami Beach Senior High School in Miami Beach, Florida, where he was named Super Prep Dixie Defensive Player of the Year and was a Dream Team selection by Blue Chip Illustrated. As a senior, he tallied 62 tackles and six interceptions on defense, and threw for 1,217 yards and eight touchdowns at quarterback, he also rushed for 402 yards and returned three punts for touchdowns. He was a teammate of future pro bowler Duane Starks. He then played in the Super 24 Florida-Georgia All-Star Game.

== College career ==
Rolle played College football at Florida State University. He played in 38 games with 24 starts and made 12 interceptions and 111 tackles in his four-year career. In his senior season he was named First-Team All-ACC and Football News Third-Team All-America. Four of his 12 career interceptions came against rival Miami Hurricanes.

== Professional career ==
Pre-draft measurables
Height	Weight	Arm length	Hand span
5 ft 11 in (1.80 m)	173 lb (78 kg)	32 3/4 in (0.83 m)	9 in (0.23 m)

=== Tennessee Oilers/Titans ===
Samari Rolle was selected by the Tennessee Oilers in the second round (46th overall) of the 1998 NFL draft. In his rookie season he played in 15 games and finished the campaign with 30 tackles. The following year, he recorded 69 tackles, three sacks and four interceptions. He shares the franchise record with three interceptions in one game in 1999 against the Jacksonville Jaguars. In 1999, the Titans made it to Super Bowl XXXIV in which Rolle started, however they lost to the Kurt Warner-led St. Louis Rams. He was selected to the 2000 Pro Bowl after recording a seven interception season, one of which he returned for a touchdown. In 2001, he made 56 tackles and three interceptions. The following season, he started in every game and finished the season with 48 tackles and two interceptions. In 2003, he only played in 13 games after dislocating his elbow, but finished the season with 31 tackles and six interceptions. He was released by Tennessee at the end of the 2004 season for salary cap reasons and finished the campaign with 28 tackles.

=== Baltimore Ravens ===
Rolle signed for the Baltimore Ravens as an unrestricted free agent on March 7, 2005. His first year in Baltimore was decent as he recorded 41 tackles, 2 forced fumbles, 1 interception and 11 pass deflections. However, in 2006 he struggled against the deep ball in several early games, most notably in week 6 against the Panthers where Rolle gave up two long touchdowns to Drew Carter and Steve Smith. However Rolle rebounded and played relatively well in the second half of the season. He finished the season with 52 tackles and three interceptions.

Through week 10 of the 2007 NFL season, Rolle missed five games due to an undisclosed illness. On November 14, 2007, talk show hosts filling in on the Anita Marks show on Baltimore ESPN Radio 1300AM mentioned that Rolle was being treated for seizures, but no further elaboration was provided. On November 21, 2007, Rolle disclosed that the illness was epilepsy due to years of giving and receiving crushing hits during his football career. He finished the season playing in only six games and ended the campaign with 22 tackles and one interception and won the "Ed Block Courage Award"..

Even though he made ten regular season starts with three interceptions in 2008, Rolle's injuries continued to limit his playing time. He missed six games with shoulder and neck problems, and was inactive for the AFC championship playoff contest against the Pittsburgh Steelers due to a groin injury. He got an interception as a starter in the other two postseason matches. It came in a 13–10 win against Tennessee, his former team.

Rolle was released by the team on March 18, 2009, only to be re-signed by the team on April 6. He was released again on April 13, 2010.

== NFL career statistics ==
Year	Team	Games	Combined Tackles	Solo Tackles	Assisted Tackles	Sacks	Forced Fumbles	Fumble Recoveries	Fumble return yards	Interceptions	Interception return yards	Yards per interception return	Longest interception return	Interceptions returned for touchdown	Passes defended
1998	TEN	15	25	21	4	2.0	1	0	0	0	0	0	0	0	6
1999	TEN	16	69	57	12	3.0	1	1	0	4	65	16	30	0	14
2000	TEN	15	39	35	4	1.5	0	1	0	7	140	20	81	1	18
2001	TEN	14	55	51	4	2.0	0	2	0	3	3	1	3	0	14
2002	TEN	16	48	39	9	0.0	0	0	0	2	0	0	0	0	13
2003	TEN	13	31	23	8	0.0	0	2	0	6	141	24	52	0	17
2004	TEN	11	28	27	1	0.0	0	1	0	1	0	0	0	0	7
2005	BAL	16	39	37	2	0.0	2	0	0	1	11	11	11	0	11
2006	BAL	16	52	48	4	1.0	0	0	0	3	60	20	44	0	11
2007	BAL	6	22	21	1	0.0	0	0	0	1	0	0	0	0	4
2008	BAL	10	23	21	2	0.0	1	0	0	3	5	2	3	0	8
2009	BAL	0	Did not play due to injury												
Career		148	431	380	51	9.5	5	7	0	31	425	14	81	1	123

== Personal life ==
Rolle wore the number #22 as a tribute to his high school teammate and former Ravens cornerback Duane Starks.

On June 13, 2007, Rolle was in South Africa on board a small commuter airplane returning from a safari when the door at the back of the plane flew off. Rolle was on the plane with his wife along with then-Philadelphia Eagles cornerback Lito Sheppard, then-Jacksonville Jaguars running back Fred Taylor, their respective wives and three other people. However, no one was seriously hurt and the flight landed safely.

His name "Samari" means strength. He is of Bahamian and Cuban descent. Along with his wife, Danisha, and the Samari Rolle Foundation, in 2002, he kicked off a bowling tournament featuring his Titans teammates, members of the media and corporate sponsors. Rolle and Danisha have 2 daughters, Samara, 20 and Amari, 14 and a son, Jamir, 15

On May 7, 2010, Rolle announced his retirement from the NFL after 12 seasons citing neck injuries as the main reason.

Rolle is currently an assistant football coach at Atlantic Community High School in Delray Beach, Florida.
