= Denard Walker =

American football player (born 1973)

No. 25, 27, 26
- Position: Safety

Personal information
- Born: August 9, 1973 (age 53); Dallas, Texas, U.S.
- Listed height: 6 ft 1 in (1.85 m)
- Listed weight: 190 lb (86 kg)

Career information
- High school: South Garland (Garland, Texas)
- College: LSU
- NFL draft: 1997: 3rd round, 75th overall pick

Career history
- Tennessee Oilers / Titans (1997–2000); Denver Broncos (2001–2002); Minnesota Vikings (2003); Oakland Raiders (2004–2005)

Career NFL statistics
- Tackles: 464
- Interceptions: 13
- Touchdowns: 2
- Stats at Pro Football Reference

Denard Antuan Walker (born August 9, 1973) is an American former professional football player who was a cornerback in the National Football League (NFL). Walker was selected by the Tennessee Oilers in the 1997 NFL draft out of Louisiana State University.

== Professional career ==
On October 26, 1997, Walker recorded his first career pick-six, which came from off of Arizona Cardinals quarterback Jake Plummer.

On January 30, 2000, the Titans made it to Super Bowl XXXIV in which Walker started. The team lost to the St. Louis Rams.

On October 28, 2001, as a member of the Denver Broncos, Walker recorded his second career pick-six, which came off of quarterback Tom Brady. The interception recorded late in the fourth quarter and helped the Broncos defeat the New England Patriots.

== NFL career statistics ==
Legend
	Led the league
**Bold**	Career high

=== Regular season ===
Year	Team	Games		Tackles				Interceptions				Fumbles			
Year	Team	GP	GS	Comb	Solo	Ast	Sck	Int	Yds	TD	Lng	FF	FR	Yds	TD
1997	TEN	15	11	68	56	12	0.0	2	53	**1**	39	0	0	0	0
1998	TEN	16	16	**83**	**68**	**15**	0.0	2	6	0	6	0	0	0	0
1999	TEN	15	14	47	39	8	0.0	1	27	0	27	0	**1**	**83**	**1**
2000	TEN	15	14	45	44	1	0.0	2	4	0	4	0	0	0	0
2001	DEN	16	15	56	51	5	0.0	**3**	**60**	**1**	39	0	**1**	0	0
2002	DEN	16	16	64	56	8	0.0	1	8	0	8	0	0	0	0
2003	MIN	16	8	53	48	5	0.0	1	0	0	0	0	0	0	0
2004	OAK	16	5	45	43	2	0.0	1	45	0	**45**	0	**1**	28	0
2005	OAK	9	0	3	2	1	0.0	0	0	0	0	0	0	0	0
		134	99	464	407	57	0.0	13	203	2	45	0	3	111	1

=== Playoffs ===
Year	Team	Games		Tackles				Interceptions				Fumbles			
Year	Team	GP	GS	Comb	Solo	Ast	Sck	Int	Yds	TD	Lng	FF	FR	Yds	TD
1999	TEN	4	4	**15**	**15**	0	0.0	0	0	0	0	0	**3**	**4**	0
2000	TEN	1	1	2	2	0	0.0	0	0	0	0	0	0	0	0
		5	5	17	17	0	0.0	0	0	0	0	0	3	4	0
