= Frank Chamberlin =

American football player (1978–2013)

No. 57, 55, 59
- Position: Linebacker

Personal information
- Born: January 2, 1978; Mahwah, New Jersey, U.S.
- Died: November 17, 2013 (aged 35); Ridgewood, New Jersey, U.S.
- Listed height: 6 ft 1 in (1.85 m)
- Listed weight: 235 lb (107 kg)

Career information
- College: Boston College
- NFL draft: 2000: 5th round, 160th overall pick

Career history
- Tennessee Titans (2000–2002); Cincinnati Bengals (2003–2004); Houston Texans (2005)

Career NFL statistics
- Games: 57
- Tackles: 55
- Sacks: 1
- Stats at Pro Football Reference

Frank Jacob Chamberlin (January 2, 1978 – November 17, 2013) was an American professional football linebacker. Chamberlin attended Mahwah High School, in Mahwah, New Jersey. He was a four-year letterman and two-year starter for Boston College who made 126 tackles as a senior, earning second-team All-Big East honors. He also won the team's Scanlan Award, the highest honor for a B.C. football player.

Chamberlin was drafted by the Tennessee Titans in the fifth round (160th overall) of the 2000 NFL draft. He played in 43 games for the Titans from 2000 to 2002. He later played for the Cincinnati Bengals (2003) and Houston Texans (2005). He played a total of 57 games in the NFL, making a total of 45 combined tackles, one sack and two forced fumbles. He died on November 17, 2013, aged 35, after a year-long battle against brain cancer.

== NFL career statistics ==
Legend
**Bold**	Career high

=== Regular season ===
Year	Team	Games		Tackles					Interceptions					Fumbles			
Year	Team	GP	GS	Cmb	Solo	Ast	Sck	TFL	Int	Yds	TD	Lng	PD	FF	FR	Yds	TD
2000	TEN	12	0	11	9	2	0.0	0	0	0	0	0	0	0	0	0	0
2001	TEN	**16**	0	18	13	5	**1.0**	**1**	0	0	0	0	**1**	**1**	0	0	0
2002	TEN	15	**3**	**22**	**16**	**6**	0.0	0	0	0	0	0	**1**	0	**1**	**8**	0
2003	CIN	5	0	1	1	0	0.0	0	0	0	0	0	0	0	0	0	0
2005	HOU	9	0	3	1	2	0.0	0	0	0	0	0	0	0	0	0	0
		57	3	55	40	15	1.0	1	0	0	0	0	2	1	1	8	0

=== Playoffs ===
Year	Team	Games		Tackles					Interceptions					Fumbles			
Year	Team	GP	GS	Cmb	Solo	Ast	Sck	TFL	Int	Yds	TD	Lng	PD	FF	FR	Yds	TD
2000	TEN	1	0	0	0	0	0.0	0	0	0	0	0	0	0	0	0	0
2002	TEN	**2**	0	**2**	**2**	0	0.0	**1**	0	0	0	0	0	0	0	0	0
		3	0	2	2	0	0.0	1	0	0	0	0	0	0	0	0	0
