= Chester Burnett (American football) =

American football player (born 1975)

No. 56, 54
- Position: Linebacker

Personal information
- Born: April 15, 1975 (age 51); Denver, Colorado, U.S.
- Listed height: 5 ft 10 in (1.78 m)
- Listed weight: 230 lb (104 kg)

Career information
- High school: Mullen (Denver)
- College: Arizona
- NFL draft: 1998: 7th round, 208th overall pick

Career history
- Minnesota Vikings (1998)*; Washington Redskins (1998); Jacksonville Jaguars (1999); Cleveland Browns (2000)
- * Offseason or practice squad member only

Awards and highlights
- Second-team All-Pac-10 (1996)

Career NFL statistics
- Tackles: 4
- Stats at Pro Football Reference

Chester Dean Burnett (born April 15, 1975) is an American former professional football player who was a linebacker in the National Football League (NFL) for the Washington Redskins, Jacksonville Jaguars, and Cleveland Browns. He played college football for the Arizona Wildcats and was selected by the Minnesota Vikings in the seventh round of the 1998 NFL draft.

== Personal life ==
Burnett is married to his wife, Jeena, with whom he has three children. His eldest son, Keyan, plays tight end at Arizona.
