= Redemption Church =

- Location: San Jose, California
- Country: United States
- Denomination: Non-denominational church

History
- Former name: Jubilee Worship Center
- Founded: 1980
- Founder: Dick Bernal

Redemption Church, led by Ron Carpenter, is the largest non-denominational church in San Jose, California, United States. The original church has 14,000 members, with lesser numbers attending its five "branch" churches.

== History ==
The church was founded in 1980 as Jubilee Christian Center by Dick Bernal. In 1998, the church moved in a new building. In 2000, they began a hip-hop worship service.

In 2015 it was announced that Bishop Michael Pitts would be holding monthly revival meetings at the Church. He has known Pastor Dick Bernal since 1998 when he first preached at the annual "Thunder In the Bay" conference. Formally known as Jubilee Worship Center, Dick Bernal was the founding pastor until 2018, when the Church changed its name to Redemption Church and Ron Carpenter became the Senior pastor.

In 2018, Carpenter announced that Pastors John and Aventer Gray, formerly of Lakewood Church would be taking over as Lead Pastors of Redemption's Greenville, South Carolina campus. In a surprising move, the Gray family announced shortly after that they were moving away from the Redemption brand and were renaming their church, with the Gray's as the senior pastors.

This set in motion a level of turmoil between Gray, Carpenter and their respective churches. In 2020, Carpenter and Redemption Church sought to evict Relentless Church from the church building due to Gray and his church not fulfilling the financial obligations of their lease of the building, at the time still owned by Redemption. The matter was eventually confidentially settled out of court, but questions of ownership of the Greenville building are still with the courts.
