= Jackie Harris =

American football player (born 1968)

No. 80, 81, 88
- Position: Tight end

Personal information
- Born: January 4, 1968 (age 58); Pine Bluff, Arkansas, U.S.
- Listed height: 6 ft 4 in (1.93 m)
- Listed weight: 250 lb (113 kg)

Career information
- High school: Pine Bluff
- College: Northeast Louisiana
- NFL draft: 1990: 4th round, 102nd overall pick

Career history
- Green Bay Packers (1990–1993); Tampa Bay Buccaneers (1994–1997); Tennessee Oilers / Titans (1998–1999); Dallas Cowboys (2000–2001)

Awards and highlights
- Second-team All-Pro (1992); Division I-AA All-American (1989); All-SLC (1989); Second-team All-SLC (1987)

Career NFL statistics
- Receptions: 393
- Receiving yards: 4,410
- Receiving touchdowns: 25
- Stats at Pro Football Reference

Jackie Bernard Harris (born January 4, 1968) is an American former professional football player who was a tight end in the National Football League (NFL) for the Green Bay Packers, Tampa Bay Buccaneers, Tennessee Oilers / Titans and Dallas Cowboys. He played college football at what is now known as the University of Louisiana at Monroe.

== Early life ==
Harris attended Dollarway High School, where he played football and basketball, and ran track. He was a two-way player at wide receiver and defensive back. As a senior, he helped lead the team to the state finals and earned all-state honors.

Harris accepted a football scholarship from the Northeast Louisiana Indians (now the University of Louisiana at Monroe). As a sophomore, he became a starter at tight end, catching passes from future NFL quarterback Stan Humphries. They were members of the team that won the 1987 NCAA Division I-AA Football Championship Game. As a junior, Harris missed half the season with a knee injury, posting 43 receptions for 512 yards and two touchdowns. He had a school and conference record with 16 receptions against Lamar University. As a senior, he collected 54 receptions for 661 yards and seven touchdowns. He finished as the school's all-time leading receiver with 147 receptions for 2,107 yards and 14 touchdowns.

== Professional career ==
=== Green Bay Packers ===
Harris was selected by the Green Bay Packers in the fourth round (102nd overall) of the 1990 NFL draft. In 1991, he was fourth on the team with 24 receptions for 264 yards and three touchdowns while making 6 starts in two tight end formations.

In 1992, he became a full-time starter until the seventh game of the season and still registered 55 receptions, which ranked second on the team and second in the NFL for tight ends. He received NFC Offensive Player of the Week after tallying 5 catches for 128 yards (team record for tight ends), including a career-long 66-yard touchdown, against the Denver Broncos.

The next year despite missing 4 games with a left meniscus tear, he tallied 42 receptions, finishing second on the team in receiving behind Sterling Sharpe for the second year in a row. His knee injury forced him to miss 2 playoff games.

On June 22, 1994, Harris signed a 4-year, $7.6 million contract with the Tampa Bay Buccaneers as a restricted free agent, becoming the NFL's highest-paid tight end by annual average salary. Although the Packers had the option, they eventually decided not to match the offer.

=== Tampa Bay Buccaneers ===
In 1994, he was limited to only 9 games, after suffering a shoulder subluxation against the Chicago Bears and being placed on the injured reserve list on November 22. At the time of his injury, he was second in receptions among NFC tight ends.

In 1995, he started 16 games for the first time in his career, recording career-highs with 62 receptions (team record for tight ends) for 751 yards. Against the Green Bay Packers, he established a new club record for receptions by a tight end with 10 catches for 122 yards.

In 1996, Tony Dungy became the team's new head coach and installed a run-oriented offense, which caused his production to decline over the next two years.

In 1997, he missed four games with a groin injury, returning in the playoffs against the Detroit Lions. He was placed on the injured reserve list before the divisional playoff game against the Green Bay Packers, due to complications from his recent hernia surgery.

=== Tennessee Oilers / Titans ===
On March 11, 1998, he signed as a free agent with the Tennessee Oilers, finishing second on the team with 43 receptions for 412 yards and 2 touchdowns.

In 1999, his 14 postseason receptions for a team-high 117 yards, tied for the team lead in postseason receptions. Harris started in a 2 tight end formation in Super Bowl XXXIV, although they would lose to the Kurt Warner-led St. Louis Rams.

=== Dallas Cowboys ===
Harris signed with the Dallas Cowboys as a free agent on March 17, 2000. He was given Michael Irvin old number #88. Although he was just expected to replace backup Eric Bjornson and complement tight end David LaFleur, after wide receivers Joey Galloway and Raghib Ismail were lost for the season, Harris became an integral part of the offense, lining up at different positions, while finishing first on the team in touchdown catches (5), second in receptions (39) and third in receiving yards (306). In 2001, LaFleur was waived injured and he became the team's starter at tight end.

After completing two years of a four-year contract, Harris was released by the team on February 28, 2002 to "create salary cap room", effectively ending his NFL career.

== NFL career statistics ==
Legend
**Bold**	Career high

=== Regular season ===
Year	Team	Games		Receiving				
Year	Team	GP	GS	Rec	Yds	Avg	Lng	TD
1990	GNB	**16**	3	12	157	13.1	26	0
1991	GNB	**16**	6	24	264	11.0	35	3
1992	GNB	**16**	11	55	595	10.8	40	2
1993	GNB	12	12	42	604	**14.4**	**66**	4
1994	TAM	9	9	26	337	13.0	48	3
1995	TAM	**16**	**16**	**62**	**751**	12.1	33	1
1996	TAM	13	12	30	349	11.6	36	1
1997	TAM	12	11	19	197	10.4	39	1
1998	TEN	**16**	**16**	43	412	9.6	32	2
1999	TEN	12	1	26	297	11.4	62	1
2000	DAL	**16**	7	39	306	7.8	21	**5**
2001	DAL	13	12	15	141	9.4	28	2
		167	116	393	4,410	11.2	66	25

=== Playoffs ===
Year	Team	Games		Receiving				
Year	Team	GP	GS	Rec	Yds	Avg	Lng	TD
1997	TAM	1	0	1	4	4.0	4	0
1999	TEN	**4**	**2**	**14**	**117**	**8.4**	**21**	0
		5	2	15	121	8.1	21	0

== Personal life ==
In October 1996, Harris purchased KPBA (1270 AM), a Christian radio station operated by a local Baptist church. By 1999, he would expand his media holdings to three radio stations, all playing a Christian radio format.

In June 2001, Jackie Harris and his wife Letrece were honored for their "commitment to downtown Pine Bluff" as Small Business Persons of the Year by the Greater Pine Bluff Chamber of Commerce.
