= Tucker Fisk =

American football player (born 1999)

Profile
- Position: Tight end

Personal information
- Born: January 19, 1999 (age 27); Edina, Minnesota, U.S.
- Listed height: 6 ft 4 in (1.93 m)
- Listed weight: 285 lb (129 kg)

Career information
- High school: Davis Senior (Davis, California)
- College: Stanford (2018–2021)
- NFL draft: 2022: undrafted

Career history
- Atlanta Falcons (2022–2023); Los Angeles Chargers (2024–2025)

Career NFL statistics as of Week 18, 2024
- Receptions: 8
- Receiving yards: 48
- Stats at Pro Football Reference

Tucker Davies Fisk (born January 19, 1999) is an American professional football tight end. He played college football for the Stanford Cardinal, before signing as an undrafted free agent with the Atlanta Falcons in 2022.

== Early life ==
Fisk attended and played high school football at Davis Senior High School.

== College career ==
Fisk played college football for the Stanford Cardinal from 2017 to 2021.

== Professional career ==
Pre-draft measurables
Height	Weight	Arm length	Hand span	40-yard dash	10-yard split	20-yard split	20-yard shuttle	Three-cone drill	Vertical jump	Broad jump	Bench press
6 ft 3 1/2 in (1.92 m)	287 lb (130 kg)	32 1/8 in (0.82 m)	10 3/4 in (0.27 m)	5.22 s	1.81 s	3.01 s	4.59 s	7.33 s	30.5 in (0.77 m)	9 ft 0 in (2.74 m)	21 reps
All values from Pro Day

=== Atlanta Falcons ===
On May 16, 2022, Fisk signed with the Atlanta Falcons as an undrafted free agent. On January 9, 2023, Fisk signed a futures/reserve contract with the Falcons. He made his NFL debut for the Falcons in Week 7 of the 2023 season. He was signed to the active roster on December 23.

On May 22, 2024, Fisk was released by the Falcons.

=== Los Angeles Chargers ===
On August 14, 2024, Fisk signed with the Los Angeles Chargers. He was waived on August 27, and re-signed to the practice squad. Fisk was promoted to the active roster on November 9. He made nine appearances (five starts) for Los Angeles, recording seven receptions for 39 yards.

On April 21, 2025, Fisk re-signed with the Chargers. In 10 appearances (seven starts) for the team, he logged two receptions for 19 scoreless yards. On December 8, Fisk was placed on injured reserve due to an ankle injury. He was activated on January 10, 2026, ahead of the team's Wild Card matchup against the New England Patriots.
