= Chris Coleman (wide receiver, born 1977) =

American football player (born 1977)

No. 17, 80
- Position: Wide receiver

Personal information
- Born: May 8, 1977 (age 49); Shelby, North Carolina, U.S.
- Listed height: 6 ft 0 in (1.83 m)
- Listed weight: 202 lb (92 kg)

Career information
- High school: Crest (Shelby)
- College: NC State (1996–1999)
- NFL draft: 2000: undrafted

Career history
- Tennessee Titans (2000)*; Green Bay Packers (2000)*; Tennessee Titans (2000–2001); → Amsterdam Admirals (2001); Orlando Predators (2003); Montreal Alouettes (2003)
- * Offseason or practice squad member only

Awards and highlights
- All-NFL Europe (2001)
- Stats at Pro Football Reference

Christopher Tyrone Coleman (born May 8, 1977) is an American former professional football wide receiver who played two seasons with the Tennessee Titans of the National Football League (NFL). He played college football at NC State. He also played for the Amsterdam Admirals of NFL Europe and the Montreal Alouettes of the Canadian Football League (CFL).

== Early life ==
Christopher Tyrone Coleman was born on May 8, 1977, in Shelby, North Carolina. He attended Crest High School in Shelby.

== College career ==
Coleman was a four-year letterman for the NC State Wolfpack from 1996 to 1999. He caught 15 passes for 284 yards and one touchdown in 1996 while also returning one punt 47 yards for a touchdown. He recorded 14 receptions for 262 yards and one touchdown in 1997. As a junior in 1998, Coleman totaled 52 catches for 876 yards and five touchdowns, and one punt return for 30 yards and a touchdown. He caught 41 passes for 487 yards and one touchdown his senior year in 1999 while also returning seven punts for 46 yards.

== Professional career ==
After going undrafted in the 2000 NFL draft, Coleman signed with the Tennessee Titans on April 28. He was waived on August 22, 2000.

Coleman was claimed off waivers by the Green Bay Packers on August 23, 2000, but was soon waived on August 25, 2000.

He was signed to the Titans' practice squad on August 29, 2000. He was waived again on September 5 but signed to the practice squad again on September 8. He was promoted to the active roster on September 29 and played in 13 games for the Titans during the 2000 season, recording eight solo tackles, three assisted tackles, and two kick returns for 54 yards. On January 7, 2001, Coleman blocked two punts in a 24–10 playoff loss to the Baltimore Ravens. He was allocated to NFL Europe to play for the Amsterdam Admirals in 2001. He started all ten games for the Admirals during the 2001 NFL Europe season, accumulating 51 receptions for 710 yards and eight touchdowns, two tackles, and one blocked kick. He earned All-NFL Europe honors. Coleman appeared in all 16 games for the Titans in 2001, totaling one reception for 19 yards on four targets, 11 kick returns for 251 yards, and five solo tackles. He was released on September 1, 2002.

Coleman was signed by the Orlando Predators of the Arena Football League on November 16, 2002. He was placed on injured reserve on January 28, 2003, and was waived on February 19, 2003.

He played in five games for the Montreal Alouettes of the Canadian Football League in 2003, recording nine catches for 120 yards.

== Post-playing career ==
Coleman spent time working as a real estate broker after his playing career. He graduated from the University of Phoenix with a Masters in Business Administration.

He has spent time as an assistant coach at Lenoir–Rhyne University and Southern University. He was also a coaching intern with the St. Louis Rams.
