= KYDE =

Radio station in Pine Bluff, Arkansas (1957–1998)

- Pine Bluff, Arkansas; United States
- Frequency: 1590 kHz

Programming
- Format: Defunct

Ownership
- Owner: Southwest Communications, Inc.

History
- First air date: October 16, 1957
- Last air date: circa 1998
- Former call signs: KPBA (1957–1976)

Technical information
- Facility ID: 61453
- Power: 5,000 watts day 500 watts night
- Transmitter coordinates: 34°14′45.6″N 92°0′57.6″W

KYDE was a radio station on 1590 kHz in Pine Bluff, Arkansas.

== History ==
KPBA signed on October 16, 1957, beginning commercial operation on October 22. The station was owned by W. L. Kent, trading as Radio Pine Bluff, and operated during the daytime with 1,000 watts. Four days in, on October 25, it played the same record over and over for six hours, drawing hundreds to the new station and prompting over 8,000 phone calls, before revealing the stunt was designed to promote KPBA as mostly music. Kent held a majority stake in KPBA until 1964, when Bruce Gresham and J.C. Noble bought the station for $27,500. Gresham bought out Noble's share in KPBA in 1973 for $10,000.

In 1975, KPBA, Inc., owned by owners mostly from Mississippi, acquired the station for $155,000. The new ownership changed the call letters to KYDE on March 8, 1976. Under the new call letters, the outlet was sold again in 1978 to Smith, Davis and Shields, Inc., all owners of KGMR in Jacksonville, Arkansas, for $325,000.

The carousel of owners continued into the 1980s, when Southwest Communications purchased the outlet for $307,000. Under Southwest, KYDE was an urban radio station programmed to serve the African American community in Pine Bluff. It also received approval to begin broadcasting at night with 500 watts. Southwest attempted to sell the station in 1985 to Elmer Dancy, owner of an oil company, for $385,000, offering to finance the purchase if the seller could not arrange financing. However, Dancy ultimately could not work financially, and the bank foreclosed on the station; Southwest repurchased the station in 1991 after filing to receive the license from the bankruptcy trustee two years earlier.

In 1997, KYDE aired a black gospel/Southern gospel format. The station's license was deleted in 1998.
