= Joe Salave'a =

American football player and coach (born 1975)

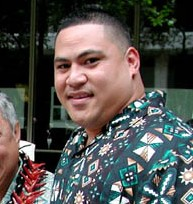

Current position
- Title: Associate head coach, defensive line coach
- Team: Arizona
- Conference: Big 12 Conference

Biographical details
- Born: March 23, 1975 (age 51); Leone, American Samoa

Playing career
- 1994–1997: Arizona
- 1998–2001: Tennessee Oilers/Titans
- 2003: Baltimore Ravens
- 2003: San Diego Chargers
- 2004–2006: Washington Redskins
- Position: Defensive tackle

Coaching career (HC unless noted)
- 2008–2009: San Jose State (DL)
- 2011: Arizona (DL)
- 2012–2016: Washington State (AHC/DL)
- 2017–2021: Oregon (AHC/DL/co-DC)
- 2022–2024: Miami (FL) (AHC/RGC/DL)
- 2025–present: Arizona (AHC/DL)

Accomplishments and honors

Awards
- First-team All-Pac-10 (1997); Second-team All-Pac-10 (1996)

Joe Fagaofe Salave'a (/sɑːləˈveɪ.ə/; born March 23, 1975) is an American football coach and former defensive tackle who is currently the associate head coach, and defensive line coach at the University of Arizona. He previously served as the associate head coach, defensive line coach and co-defensive coordinator at the University of Oregon from 2017 to 2021 and the University of Miami from 2022 to 2024.

Salave'a played college football at the University of Arizona and was drafted by the Tennessee Oilers in the fourth round of the 1998 NFL draft. He played for nine seasons in the NFL with the Tennessee Oilers / Titans, Baltimore Ravens, San Diego Chargers and Washington Redskins. Following the end of his playing career, Salave’a began coaching at San Jose State University as a defensive line coach in 2008. Since then, he has coached at the University of Arizona, Washington State University and the University of Oregon.

== Early life ==
Salave'a attended Widefield High School, located in Security-Widefield, Colorado, 1990. He moved to Oceanside, California near San Diego, in 1991, and graduated from Oceanside High School.

== Playing career ==
=== College ===
Salave'a attended and played college football at the University of Arizona. In football, he was a three-year starter and a two-time All-Pacific-10 Conference selection.

=== National Football League ===
==== Tennessee Oilers / Titans ====
Salave'a was drafted by the Tennessee Oilers in the 1998 NFL draft and would spend five seasons with Tennessee. In 1999, the Titans made it to Super Bowl XXXIV in which Salave'a appeared as a substitute, however they lost to the Kurt Warner-led St. Louis Rams.

==== Baltimore Ravens ====
In 2003, Salave'a was signed by the Baltimore Ravens.

==== San Diego Chargers ====
In 2003, Salave'a was signed by the San Diego Chargers and spent one season with the Chargers.

==== Washington Redskins ====
In 2004, Salave’a signed with the Washington Redskins. Playing primarily as a backup, Salave'a had a breakthrough year in 2004, registering 30 tackles and two sacks for the second-ranked Redskins defense. In 2005, he started 13 games and had 50 tackles, a half-sack, a forced fumble and a fumble recovery, helping to lead the Redskins to their first playoff appearance of the decade.

Salave'a was released by the Redskins on August 28, 2007.

== Coaching career ==
=== San Jose State ===
In April 2008, Salave'a began his coaching career at San Jose State University as their defensive line coach under head coach Dick Tomey.

=== Arizona ===
On December 16, 2010, Salave’a was named the defensive line coach at the University of Arizona. When Rich Rodriguez was hired as head coach at Arizona for the 2012 season, Salave'a was not retained.

=== Washington State ===
In 2012, Salave'a joined Washington State University as their defensive line coach under head coach Mike Leach. Salave’a was later promoted to assistant head coach and defensive line coach.

=== Oregon ===
In January 2017, Salave'a was hired as the associate head coach, defensive line coach and co-defensive coordinator at the University of Oregon under head coach Mario Cristobal.

=== Miami ===
On January 7, 2022, Salave'a was hired as the associate head coach, run game coordinator and defensive line coach at the University of Miami following head coach Mario Cristobal.

== Personal life ==
Salave'a's older brother, Okland Salave'a, played football at Colorado from 1987 to 1989. Salave'a also has his own foundation—the Joe Salave'a foundation.
