= Scott Sanderson (American football) =

American football player (born 1974)

No. 73, 74
- Position: Tackle

Personal information
- Born: July 25, 1974 (age 52); Walnut Creek, California, U.S.
- Listed height: 6 ft 6 in (1.98 m)
- Listed weight: 295 lb (134 kg)

Career information
- High school: Clayton Valley (Concord, California)
- College: Washington State
- NFL draft: 1997: 3rd round, 81st overall pick

Career history
- Tennessee Titans (1997–2000); Cleveland Browns (2001)*; New Orleans Saints (2001–2002); Chicago Bears (2003)
- * Offseason or practice squad member only

Awards and highlights
- First-team All-American (1996); First-team All-Pac-10 (1996); Second-team All-Pac-10 (1995)

Career NFL statistics
- Games played: 45
- Games started: 6
- Stats at Pro Football Reference

Scott Michael Sanderson (born July 25, 1974) is an American former professional football player who was an offensive lineman in the National Football League (NFL). He played college football at Washington State University in Pullman, where he was an All-American in 1996 under head coach Mike Price. Sanderson was selected in the third round of the 1997 NFL draft by the Tennessee Oilers, and appeared mostly on special teams. He later played for the New Orleans Saints and Chicago Bears.
