= McCoy (surname) =

- Language: Gaelic

Origin
- Meaning: "son of Aodh"
- Region of origin: Kintyre, Scotland and Connacht, Ireland

Other names
- Variant forms: McKay, McKoy, McKey, McKee, McCay, McKie, McGee, Mac Aoidh, McHugh, Hughes, Hayes

McCoy is a common surname of unrelated Scottish and Irish origin. It was anglicized into the Scottish name from the Irish McGee and McHugh surnames in Irish Mac Aodha. It is an Anglicisation of its Irish form Mac Aodha, meaning son of Aodh (a name of a deity in Irish mythology and an Irish word for "fire"). The first bearers of the surname Mac Aodha were the grandsons of Aodh (died 1033), who was a son of Ruaidhrí mac Coscraigh, King of South Connacht, Ireland. The surname McCoy in Ulster however, particularly in Northern Ireland, is from the Scottish MacKays that arrived later in the 17th and 18th centuries in the Ulster plantations and became McCoys.

== People ==
- One of the families in the 19th century Hatfield-McCoy feud in Kentucky/West Virginia

=== A ===
- Al McCoy (born 1933), American sports broadcaster
- Al McCoy (1894–1966), middleweight champion boxer
- Alban McCoy (born 1951), British priest and writer, former Catholic Chaplain of Cambridge University
- Alfred McCoy (1899–1990), American college sports coach
- Alfred W. McCoy (born 1945), American author and scholar of the Asian heroin drug trade
- Alice McCoy (born 1948), member of the South Dakota House of Representatives
- Andy McCoy (born 1962), Finnish guitarist of Hanoi Rocks

=== B ===
- Barry M. McCoy (born 1940), American physicist
- Bob McCoy (1934–2016), American basketball player and coach
- Brian McCoy (1943–1975), Irish musician, trumpet player

=== C ===
- Carl McCoy (born 1963), musician
- Charlie McCoy (born 1941), American musician
- Clyde McCoy (1903–1990), American jazz trumpeter
- Colt McCoy (born 1986), American football quarterback

=== D ===
- Dave McCoy (1915–2020), American businessman and skier

=== E ===
- Elaine McCoy (1946–2020), Canadian senator
- Elijah McCoy (1844–1929), Canadian inventor and engineer
- Elin McCoy, American wine critic
- Erik McCoy (born 1997), American football player
- Ernie McCoy (1904–1980), American collegiate athletic director
- Ernie McCoy (1921–2001), Formula One driver
- Ethel Bergstresser McCoy (1893–1980), of New York City

=== F ===
- Frank Ross McCoy (1874–1954), United States Army officer
- Freddie McCoy (1932–2009), American soul-jazz vibraphonist
- Frederick McCoy (1823–1899), British palaeontologist

=== G ===
- Garry McCoy (born 1972), Australian motorcycle racer
- George McCoy (born 1948), author of a guide to sexual services in Britain
- George Walter McCoy (1876–1952), American physician
- Gerald McCoy (born 1988), American football player
- Gerry McCoy (born 1960), Scottish football player

=== H ===
- Horace McCoy (1897–1955), American writer

=== J ===
- Jack D. McCoy (1928–2020), American racing driver
- Jack E. McCoy (1929–2014), American politician
- Jack McCoy (1937–2009), American racing driver
- Jake McCoy (1942–2021), American hockey player
- Janet J. McCoy (1916–1995), American administrator and politician
- Jason McCoy (born 1970), Canadian singer/songwriter
- Jason L. McCoy (born 1971), Attorney, Mayor of the Town of Vernon, Connecticut Politician
- Javante McCoy (born 1998), American basketball player
- Jelani McCoy (born 1977), American basketball player
- Jeremy McCoy, (born 1963), American-Canadian double bassist with Metropolitan Opera Orchestra
- Jermod McCoy (born 2005), American football player
- John McCoy (disambiguation), many people
- Joseph McCoy (1837–1913), 19th-century cattle baron
- Joseph H. McCoy (died 1897), Black American lynching victim

=== K ===
- Kansas Joe McCoy (1905–1950), American musician
- Kellen McCoy (born 1987), American basketball player and coach
- Kevin McCoy (born 1967), American artist
- Kevin McCoy (born 1954), rector of the Pontifical North American College
- Kid McCoy (1872–1940), boxer (born Norman Selby)

=== L ===
- LeRon McCoy (born 1982), American football wide receiver
- LeSean McCoy (born 1988), American football running back
- LisaRaye McCoy (born 1967), American actress

=== M ===
- Maimie McCoy (born 1979), English actress
- Mark McCoy (born 1975), American musician
- Marvin McCoy (born 1988), professional footballer
- Mary Eleanora McCoy (1846–1923), American philanthropist, organizer, and clubwoman
- Matt McCoy (born 1958), American actor
- Matt McCoy (born 1982), American football linebacker
- Matt McCoy (born 1966), member of the Iowa Senate
- Mike McCoy (disambiguation), multiple people

=== N ===
- Neal McCoy (born 1958), American country music singer
- Neal Henry McCoy (1905–2001), American mathematician

=== O ===
- Obed McCoy (born 1997) West Indies cricket player

=== P ===
- Papa Charlie McCoy (1909–1950), American musician
- Paul McCoy, American musician

=== R ===
- Randolph McCoy (1825–1914) of the Hatfield–McCoy feud, also called Randolph "Ole Ran'l" McCoy.
- Richard McCoy Jr. (1942–1974), airplane hijacker
- Richard McCoy (1863–1942), Australian politician
- Richard B. McCoy (died 1902), American politician
- Rico McCoy (born 1987), American football player
- Robert McCoy (disambiguation), multiple people
- Rose Marie McCoy (1922–2015), American songwriter

=== S ===
- Simon McCoy (born 1961), British journalist and newsreader
- Stephen McCoy (1948–1989), American serial killer
- Steve McCoy, radio morning show host
- Sylvester McCoy (born 1943), Scottish actor

=== T ===
- Tim McCoy (1891–1978), American actor
- Tim McCoy (footballer) (1921–2015), English footballer
- Timothy McCoy (1955–1972), American murder victim who was killed by John Wayne Gacy
- Tony McCoy (born 1974), Irish National Hunt jockey
- Travis McCoy (born 1981), member of the hip-hop group Gym Class Heroes

=== V ===
- Van McCoy (1940–1979), music producer and songwriter

=== W ===
- Walter McCoy (disambiguation), multiple people
- William D. McCoy (1853–1893), American diplomat
- William S. McCoy (1877–1948), American rum–runner
- Wilson McCoy (1902–1961), American artist and cartoonist

== Fictional characters ==
- Danny McCoy, in the American TV series Las Vegas
- Ebenezar McCoy, in the book series The Dresden Files
- Jack McCoy, in the Law & Order franchise
- Josie McCoy, in the Josie and the Pussycats franchise

== See also ==
- McCoy (disambiguation)
- General McCoy (disambiguation)
- Senator McCoy (disambiguation)
- The real McCoy
- Hatfield–McCoy feud
