= Bob Ross (racing driver) =

American racing driver (1914–1974)

- Born: September 20, 1914; Lakewood, California, U.S.
- Died: March 20, 1974 (aged 59)
- Awards: West Coast Stock Car Hall of Fame (2003)

NASCAR Cup Series career
- 17 races run over 7 years
- Best finish: 60th (1957)
- First race: 1956 Race 24 (Merced)
- Last race: 1963 Golden State 400 (Riverside)
Wins	Top tens	Poles
0	10	1

ARCA Menards Series career
- 2 races run over 2 years
- Best finish: N/A (1959, 1960)
- First race: 1959 Race 9 (Williams Grove)
- Last race: 1960 Race 4 (Gardena)
Wins	Top tens	Poles
0	2	0

ARCA Menards Series West career
- 56 races run over 9 years
- Best finish: 1st (1959)
- First race: 1956 Race 11 (Merced)
- Last race: 1964 Race 29 (Gardena)
- First win: 1956 Race 21 (Gardena)
- Last win: 1964 Sacramento 100 (Sacramento)
Wins	Top tens	Poles
4	42	9
- Statistics up to date as of October 8, 2026.

Bob Ross (September 20, 1914 – March 20, 1974) was an American professional stock car racing driver. He competed in the NASCAR Grand National Series and NASCAR Pacific Coast Late Model Division, winning the 1959 title in the latter series.

== Racing career ==
Ross ran a Pacific Racing Association Hard Top Division race at Culver City Speedway in 1951, finishing third.

He began competing in the NASCAR Pacific Coast Late Model Division in 1956, running at least sixteen races, where he scored five poles and fourteen top-tens as well as scoring two wins at Gardena Stadium. One of these wins was a combination race with the NASCAR Short Track Division. Three of his Pacific Late Model Division starts were combination races with the NASCAR Grand National Series, where he scored two top-tens.

Ross made at least eleven Pacific Coast Late Model starts in 1957, scoring ten top-tens with a best finish of second at Contra Costa Speedway. He made a standalone Grand National start at Willow Springs Speedway, finishing sixth, and finished top-ten in both combination races he ran. He also made at least ten NASCAR Short Track Division starts, mostly combination races with the Pacific Coast Late Model Division, although he did score a standalone win at Gardena Stadium.

Ross ran at least six Pacific Coast Late Model races in 1958, scoring three top-tens with a best finish of second at the California State Fairgrounds Race Track. He made two Grand National combination race starts, finishing 39th at Riverside International Raceway and second in the aforementioned California State Fairgrounds race. He also made four NASCAR Short Track Division starts in combination races.

In 1959, Ross ran all seven races in the Pacific Coast Late Model season and finished top-five in all of them. Despite going winless during the season, he secured his first and only championship in the series. He finished fourth in both combination races with the Grand National Series. Six of the season's seven races were also in combination with the Short Track Division. He also made his first USAC Stock Car Series starts, finishing eighth at Williams Grove Speedway and Ascot Park. The races were in combination with the MARC Racing Series, with Williams Grove counting for the 1959 season and Ascot Park for the 1960 season.

Ross ran at least five Pacific Coast Late Model races in 1960, finishing second in the season opener at Ascot Park. Three of these races were combination races, where he scored a best finish of eleventh.

Ross made at least three Pacific Coast Late Model starts in 1961, with his only known results coming in the combination races; he scored his lone Grand National pole at Marchbanks Speedway and finishing second at the California State Fairgrounds.

He made at least three Pacific Coast Late Model starts in 1962 with a best finish of sixth at the California State Fairgrounds. He also made three USAC Stock Car starts with a best finish of twelfth at Ascot Park.

Ross again made at least three Pacific Coast Late Model starts in 1963, scoring a win in his only standalone start at the California State Fairgrounds and finishing fourteenth and ninth in the Riverside combination races. These were his final Grand National starts.

He made his final Pacific Coast Late Model starts in 1964, winning at the California State Fairgrounds and possibly finishing second in the season finale at Ascot Park; a conflicting version of the race results has Ron Hornaday as the second-place finisher. He also made his final USAC Stock Car start at Ascot Park, finishing eleventh.

His final recorded race is the 1967 Hillbilly 100 at Pennsboro Speedway, a dirt late model race, where he finished 28th.
