= Jack McCoy (disambiguation) =

Jack McCoy is a fictional district attorney from the TV series Law & Order. Jack McCoy may also refer to:

- Jack E. McCoy (1929–2014), American politician and labor activist
- Jack McCoy (footballer) (1911–1976), Australian rules footballer
- Jack McCoy (racing driver, born 1928) (1928–2020), American stock car racing driver
- Jack McCoy (racing driver, born 1937) (1937–2009), American stock car racing driver

== See also ==
- John McCoy (disambiguation)
