= History of the Tennessee Titans =

The Tennessee Titans are a professional American football team based in Nashville, Tennessee. They are members of the South Division of the American Football Conference (AFC) in the National Football League (NFL). Previously known as the Houston Oilers, the then Houston, Texas, team began play in 1960 as a charter member of the American Football League (AFL). The Houston Oilers won the first two AFL championships before later joining the NFL as part of the AFL–NFL merger. In 1999 , the Tennessee Titans played their most memorable season since joining the NFL, when they made it all the way to Super Bowl XXXIV, but they fell, at the 1 yard line, to the Kurt Warner-led St. Louis Rams. ( now the Los Angeles Rams)

== Franchise history ==
=== Houston Oilers (1960–1996) ===
The Titans were originally formed as the Houston Oilers, one of the eight charter members of the American Football League (AFL). They became a part of the National Football League in 1970 as part of the AFL–NFL merger and have remained a member of the NFL ever since. They played in Houston through the end of the 1996 season. They were part of the AFL's Eastern Division for their first ten years and became part of the American Football Conference upon their joining the NFL. They were placed in the AFC's Central Division, which they were part of until 2002.

=== Tennessee Oilers era (1997–1998) ===
After the 1995 season, Bud Adams announced the move to Tennessee, causing fan support in Houston to collapse for the 1996 season. They intended to play at a new stadium in Nashville, but it would not be ready until 1999. The largest stadium in Nashville at the time, Vanderbilt Stadium on the campus of Vanderbilt University, seated only 41,000 – a capacity considerably smaller than the NFL minimum of 50,000 seats. Vanderbilt was also unwilling to permit alcohol sales.

At the time, the state had two football stadiums that met NFL capacity requirements. The state's largest stadium, the University of Tennessee's Neyland Stadium in Knoxville, was quickly ruled out. Playing at Neyland would have put a transient NFL team in direct competition with the long-established Tennessee Volunteers for ticket sales, and with 102,000 seats it was widely acknowledged NFL games in Knoxville would have been all but impossible to sell out in time to avoid local blackouts on television. As a result, Adams announced that the renamed Tennessee Oilers would play the next two seasons at the 62,000 seat Liberty Bowl Memorial Stadium in Memphis. The team would be based in Nashville, practicing there and commuting to Memphis only for games. The arrangement thus made the Oilers for all intents and purposes a traveling team that was to play 32 road games over the next two years.

Even though this arrangement was acceptable to the NFL and the Oilers at the time, few people in either Memphis or Nashville were happy about it. After numerous attempts to get an NFL team over the last three decades, Memphians wanted nothing to do with a team that would be lost in only two years—especially to longtime rival Nashville. Conversely, Nashvillians showed little inclination to drive over 200 miles (320 km) to see "their" team. At the time, Interstate 40 was in the midst of major reconstruction in the Memphis area, lengthening the normal three-hour drive between Nashville and Memphis to five hours.

In Memphis, attendance was even worse than it had been in the team's final season in Houston. The Oilers played before some of the smallest NFL crowds since the 1950s, with none of the first seven games of the season attracting crowds larger than 27,000, with two crowds of less than 18,000. The few fans there were usually indifferent, and often those that attended were fans of the opposing team. Attendance was smaller than what the USFL's Memphis Showboats had drawn and what the XFL's Memphis Maniax would draw to the same stadium. It appeared that only large contingents of fans supporting the Oilers' opponents kept average attendance from dropping below what it had been for the CFL's Memphis Mad Dogs.

Despite drawing crowds averaging barely half of Vanderbilt's capacity, Adams had every intention of playing in Memphis the next season. That changed after the final game of the 1997 season. The Oilers faced the Pittsburgh Steelers in front of 50,677 fans. It was the only crowd that could not have been reasonably accommodated at Vanderbilt, however, Steeler fans made up the great majority of the crowd (at least three-fourths, by one estimate). Adams was so embarrassed that he abandoned plans to play the 1998 season in Memphis and secured a special exemption from the NFL to play one season at the undersized Vanderbilt. The team rebounded that season, and was in playoff contention until losing their last two games for another 8–8 record. The Oilers had gone 6–2 in Nashville while going 2–6 on the road. The Titans have maintained both radio and preseason television affiliates in the Memphis area.

=== Tennessee Titans era (1999–present) ===
==== Name change ====
On July 29, 1998, Adams announced that in response to fan requests, he was changing the Oilers' name to coincide with the opening of their new stadium and to better connect with Nashville. In doing so, Adams made clear that the renamed team would retain the Oilers' heritage (including the rights to the Oilers name and team records) as had most other relocated teams (the sole exception being the Browns/Ravens) and that there would be a Hall of Fame honoring the greatest players from both eras. At the time, unlike the case with Cleveland, there was no commitment from the NFL to return to Houston and a widely held expectation that the NFL would add its 32nd team in Los Angeles after the Browns' reactivation. Ultimately, and to the surprise of many, the NFL awarded a team to Houston instead, with that city's new team, the Texans, becoming division rivals of the Titans, the former Houston Oilers.

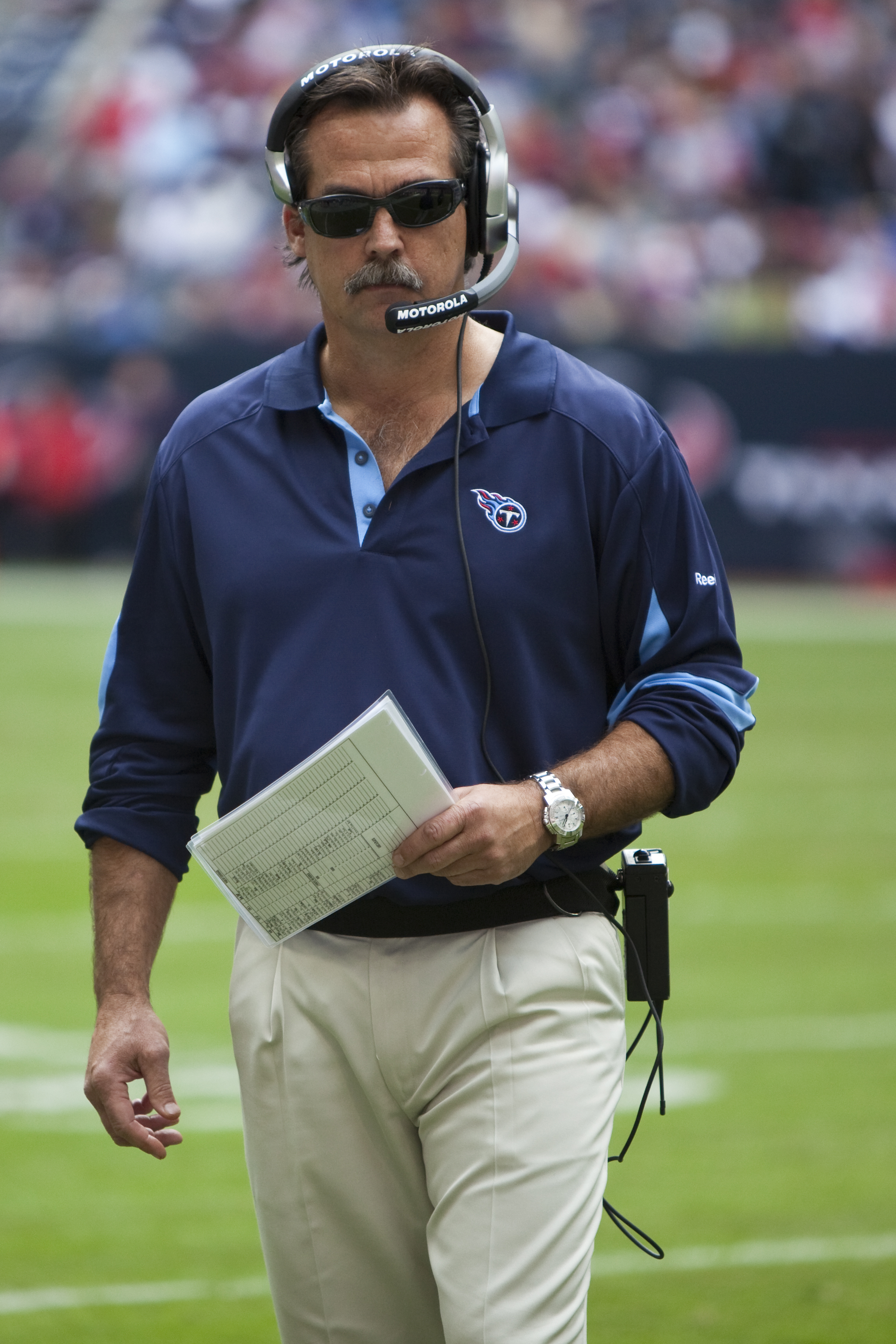
Jeff Fisher coached the Titans for nearly 17 seasons, taking over in November 1994 and staying through the 2010 season

Adams appointed an advisory committee to decide on a new name. He let it be known that the new name should reflect power, strength, leadership and other heroic qualities. A naming contest produced names such as Tornadoes, Copperheads, South Stars, and Wranglers among others. On November 14, 1998, Adams announced that the Oilers would be known as the Tennessee Titans starting in 1999. The new name met all of Adams' requirements, and also served as a nod to Nashville's nickname of "The Athens of the South" (for its large number of higher-learning institutions, Classical architecture, and its full-scale replica of the Parthenon). The team's new logo and colors were unveiled on December 22, 1998.

==== 1999: Super Bowl run ====
In 1999, Adelphia Coliseum, now known as Nissan Stadium, was completed and the newly christened Titans had a grand season, finishing with a 13–3 record – the best season in franchise history. They won their first game as the "Titans," defeating the Bengals before a sold out stadium (Every game since the Titans moved to Nashville has been sold out). They did not lose a game at home and finished one game behind the Jacksonville Jaguars for the AFC Central title. Tennessee then won their first round playoff game over the Buffalo Bills on a designed play, known as "Home Run Throwback" in the Titans playbook, that is commonly referred to as the "Music City Miracle": Tight-end Frank Wycheck made a lateral pass to Kevin Dyson on a kickoff return with 16 seconds left in the game and the Titans trailing by one point; Dyson returned the pass 75 yards for a touchdown to win the game. After replay review, the call on the field was upheld as a touchdown. The original play did not call for Dyson to be on the field and he was only involved due to an injury of another player, Derrick Mason. The Titans went on to defeat the Indianapolis Colts in Indianapolis, and then defeated the Jaguars in Jacksonville in the AFC Championship Game. The Titans' magnificent season led to a trip to Super Bowl XXXIV, where they lost to the St. Louis Rams when Kevin Dyson was tackled one yard short of the end zone (preserving a 23–16 Rams' lead) as regulation time expired, in a play known as "The Tackle."

==== 2000–2003: Continued success ====
In 2000, the Titans finished with an NFL-best 13–3 record and won their third AFC Central title—their first division title as the Tennessee Titans. They won Central division titles in 1991 and 1993 while still in Houston as the Oilers. The Titans went on to lose their home Divisional playoff game to the eventual Super Bowl champion Baltimore Ravens.

In 2001, the Titans collapsed to a 7–9 record and missed the playoffs.

In 2002, the Titans were moved to the newly created AFC South division, as part of a major divisional realignment caused by the league's return to the Titans' former city. Despite starting the season 1–4 the Titans finished the season 11–5 and made it to the AFC Championship Game but lost to the Oakland Raiders 41–24.

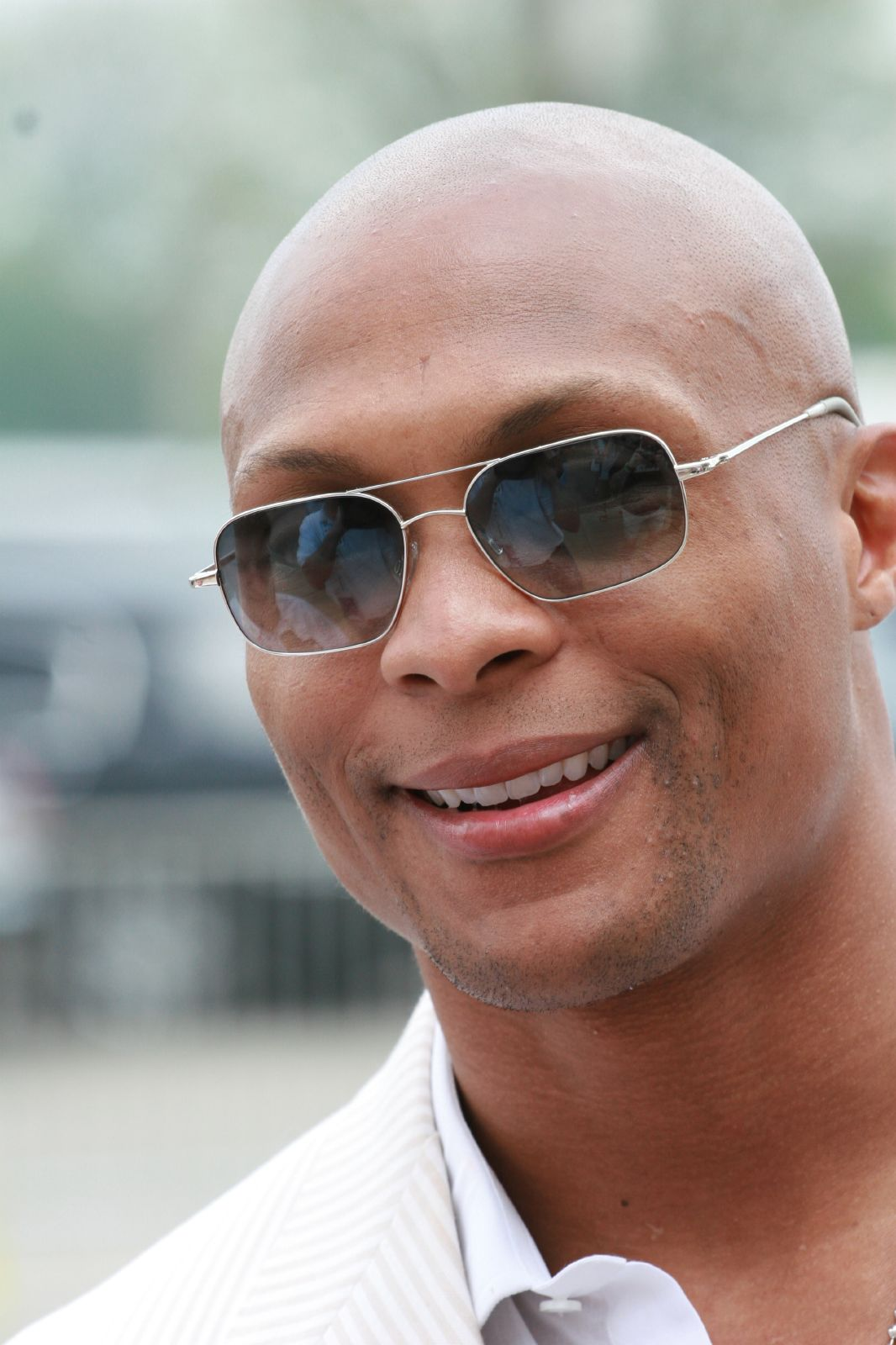
Eddie George was a hard-nosed runningback whose physical play greatly helped his team. The Titans had to release him after the 2003 season due to salary cap problems.

The Titans went 12–4 and made the 2003 playoffs, winning their wild card game over the Baltimore Ravens and losing in the AFC divisionals to the New England Patriots who went on to win Super Bowl XXXVIII. In 2003, quarterback Steve McNair won the MVP award, sharing it with Peyton Manning.

==== 2004–2010: Decline of Jeff Fisher ====
The 2004 season created an unusual number of injuries to key players for the Titans. Their 5–11 record turned out to be their third-worst record ever since the Houston/Tennessee Oilers became the Tennessee Titans. Numerous key players were cut or traded by the Titans front office during the off season, including Derrick Mason, Samari Rolle, Kevin Carter and others. This was done due to the Titans being well over the salary cap.

In 2005, the Titans took the field with the youngest team in the NFL. Several rookies made the 2005 team, including first-round pick, cornerback Adam "Pacman" Jones, offensive tackle Michael Roos, and three wide receivers, Brandon Jones, Courtney Roby and Roydell Williams. After losing their first game of the season on the road to the Pittsburgh Steelers 34–7 and then winning their Week 2 home-opener against the Baltimore Ravens 25–10, the Titans began the season 1–1, but quickly fell out of contention. They lost on the road to the St. Louis Rams 31–27 and lost to their division rival, the Colts 31–10. After getting some redemption on the road against their new division rival, the Houston Texans 34–20, they lost five-straight games to the Cincinnati Bengals (31–23), the Arizona Cardinals (20–10), the Oakland Raiders (34–25), the Cleveland Browns (20–14), and then (coming off of their Week 10 bye), their division rival, the Jacksonville Jaguars 31–28. The Titans won at home against the San Francisco 49ers 33–22, but then went on the road and were swept by the Colts 35–3. The Titans defeated the luckless Texans 13–10 at home, but that was their last win of the year, as they lost their remaining three games to the Seattle Seahawks (28–24), the Miami Dolphins (24–10) and the Jacksonville Jaguars (40–13). Their record for the season was 4–12.

In 2006, The team finished at 8–8, a definite improvement over the previous year's mark of 4–12. The year saw Vince Young lead the team to an 8–5 record as the starting quarterback. That span also included six straight victories. The team's chances of making the postseason at 9–7 ended at the hands of New England in a 40–23 defeat. Floyd Reese resigned as the franchise's executive vice president/general manager on January 5, 2007, after thirteen seasons at the helm. He was replaced by Mike Reinfeldt on February 12 of the same year.

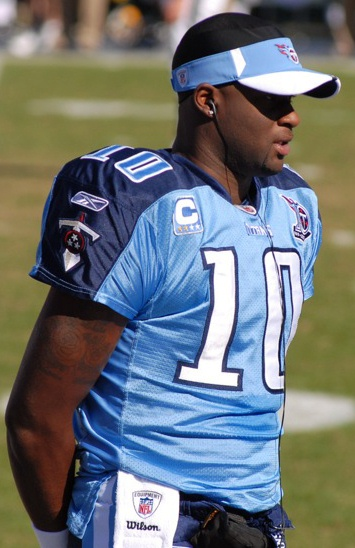
Quarterback Vince Young started 47 games between 2006 and 2010.

In 2007, after starting a promising 6–2, the Titans lost four of their next five games to fall to 7–6. They then won their next three games, including a must-win game against the Indianapolis Colts. They were tied for the final playoff spot with the Cleveland Browns, but they won the tiebreaker and made the playoffs at 10–6. In the wild card round they lost to the San Diego Chargers, 17–6.

The 2008 season began with the Titans selecting Chris Johnson out of East Carolina University in the first round of the NFL draft, and subsequently acquired former Titan (most recently Eagle) DE Jevon Kearse and former Falcons TE Alge Crumpler. After a Week 1 injury to Vince Young, Kerry Collins took over the starting quarterback position and led the Titans to a 10–0 record before their first defeat at the hands of the New York Jets on November 23.

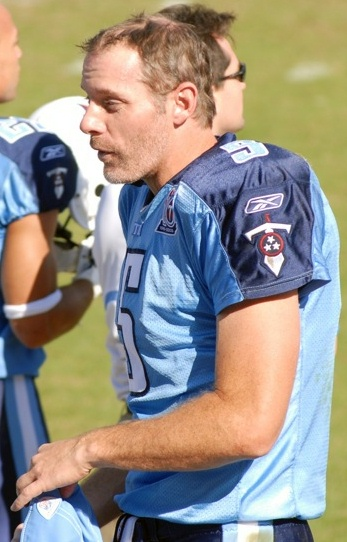
Veteran quarterback Kerry Collins started 43 games from 2006 to 2010.

The Titans followed up the 34–13 loss by defeating the winless Lions on Thanksgiving, by a score of 47–10. In week 14, Tennessee clinched its second AFC South title with a 28–9 victory over the Cleveland Browns. In the week 14 game against the Browns, rookie Chris Johnson rushed 19 times for 136 yards and one touchdown and LenDale White rushed for 99 yards and one touchdown. They later clinched a first round playoff bye with a loss of the New York Jets. On December 21, 2008, the Titans played the Pittsburgh Steelers in a contest to decide the number one seed in the AFC. The Titans won 31–14 and clinched home field advantage throughout the playoffs. Their final record was 13–3, which ties their franchise record for most wins. On Saturday, January 10, they lost their home playoff game 13–10 to the Baltimore Ravens, who had previously won their Wildcard game at Miami on January 4. The playoff game against Baltimore included three red zone turnovers and 12 penalties by the Titans.

After their successful 2008 season, the Titans looked to be very promising in 2009. However, the opening game against Pittsburgh resulted in a 13–10 overtime loss and things disintegrated from there as they dropped the next five matches. This losing streak culminated in a catastrophic 59–0 defeat at the hands of New England. After the bye week, it was decided that Vince Young would succeed Kerry Collins as the starting quarterback. The team began recovering and won five in a row including a game against the defending NFC Champion Arizona Cardinals, on a 99-yard game-winning drive by Vince Young, culminating in a touchdown pass on fourth down with 6 seconds left from the 10-yard line to Kenny Britt.

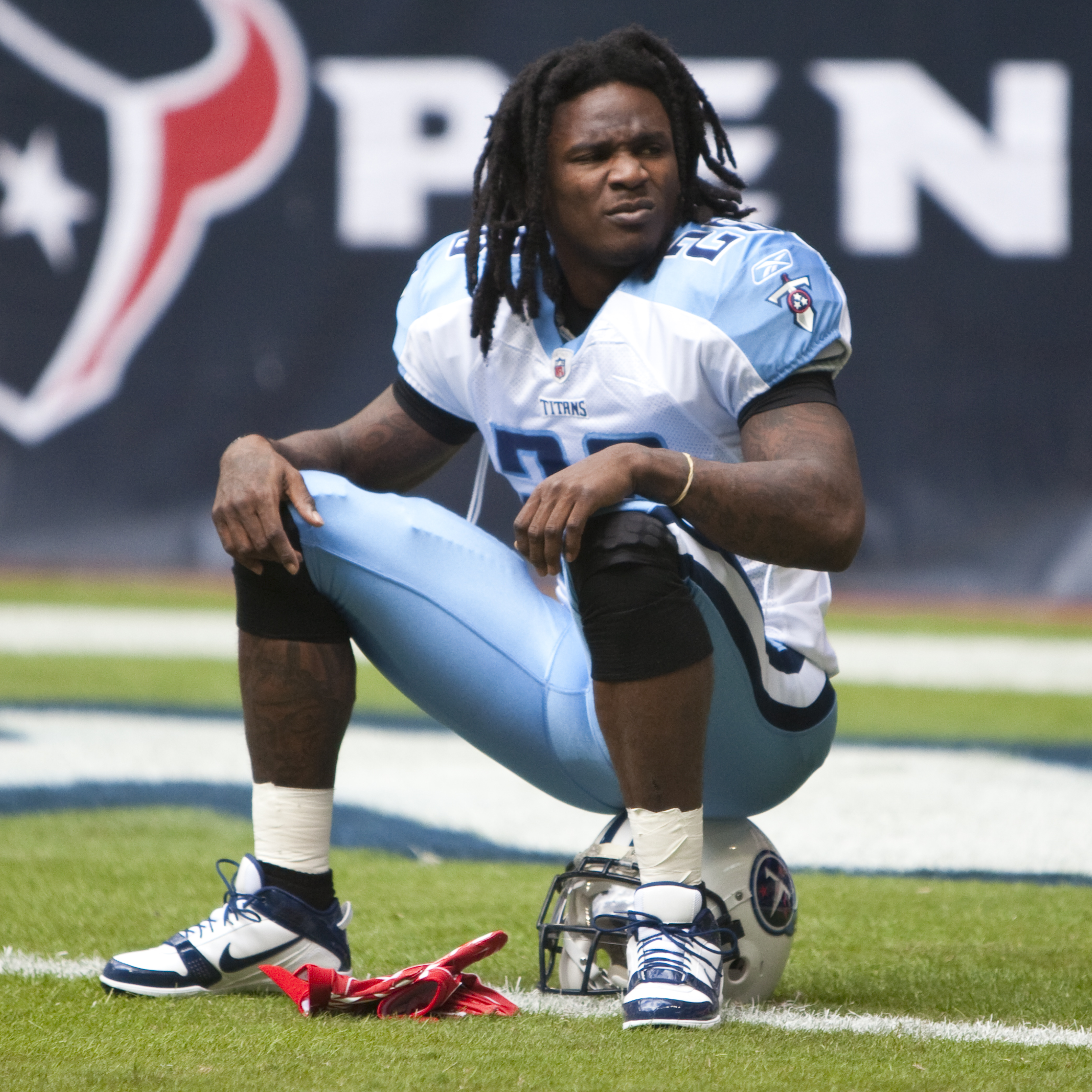
Titans running back Chris Johnson was known for his speed, which enabled him to rush for 2,006 yards in 2009, plus make himself a valuable receiver.

During the Week 10 home game against Buffalo, Bud Adams was seen making an obscene gesture towards the Bills bench, and NFL commissioner Roger Goodell (who was also attending the game) fined him $250,000. Afterwards, the Titans sustained a defeat against Indianapolis, wins over St. Louis and Miami, a loss to San Diego, and finally a victory in Seattle to end the season at 8–8. Not only did the Tennessee Titans have a great 8–2 finish, but along the way, running back Chris Johnson became only the sixth player in NFL history to rush for over 2,000 yards (2,006), surpassing Marshall Faulk's record for the most yards from scrimmage during a season with over 2,500 total yards.

The Titans started 2010 with alternating wins and losses. They crushed Oakland at home in Week 1 and then were beaten, 19–11, by the Steelers in Week 2. In Week 3, Tennessee beat the Giants 29–10 in the New Meadowlands. In week 4, Tennessee lost 26–20 to Denver, and finally won 34–27 in Dallas to reach a 3–2 record by Week 5. The following game was a MNF rout of Jacksonville (30–3). In Week 7, they beat Philadelphia 37–19 in a come-from- behind win that included scoring 27 points in the fourth quarter. Wide receiver Kenny Britt had a break out performance with 225 reception yards, 3 touchdowns and 7 receptions. However, after a loss to the Chargers in Week 8, they were the only team to submit in a claim for the recently waived Randy Moss. Even after this widely publicized claim, the team was still unable to beat the Dolphins after their bye week, 29–17. In Week 11, at home against the Washington Redskins, the Titans lost Young to a thumb injury in-game and they snapped their NFL-leading interconference win streak at 14 games, losing to Washington 19–16 in overtime. After the game, Young had a highly publicized meltdown in the locker room because he believed he could play through the injury and walked out on Fisher, causing him to not only be promptly put on injured reserve, but also essentially guaranteeing his release from the team in the offseason. Losses continued to mount for the Titans, until a week 15 win against the Houston Texans kept their season alive at 6–8. Needing a miracle to get into the playoffs, this nonetheless happened with consequent losses against the Chiefs and Colts. The Titans' season ended at 6–10.

In the week following the Titans' final loss to the Colts, the generally pro-Young Bud Adams agreed that it would be best for the team to release or trade Young. On January 7, 2011, Adams released a statement announcing he was retaining head coach Jeff Fisher, as Fisher was under contract for the next season. Adams also stated that he hoped to extend Fisher's contract following the 2011 season, but that an extension would be contingent upon the team's performance. Despite these initial proclamations, it was announced on January 27, 2011, that Fisher and the Titans had mutually agreed to part ways. This ended Fisher's tenure as head coach, a tenure which lasted more than 17 seasons (54% winning percentage), spanned three cities (Houston, Memphis and Nashville), and saw three different incarnations of the team (Houston Oilers, Tennessee Oilers, Tennessee Titans).

==== 2011–2015: Hard times ====
Following the departure of former head coach Jeff Fisher, Mike Munchak was named head coach of the Titans on February 7, 2011. During the 2011 NFL draft the Titans took Washington quarterback Jake Locker with the 8th pick overall. Meanwhile, 15-year veteran Kerry Collins retired from the NFL in July (unretiring a month later to join the Indianapolis Colts). On July 29, 2011, veteran Seahawks quarterback Matt Hasselbeck signed a 3-year, $21 million deal to play for the Tennessee Titans. During the summer training camp prior to the 2011 season, Chris Johnson did not show up to camp, pending contract negotiations. Johnson felt he was due a considerably larger sum of money. As the leading rusher since 2008 (4,598 yards) he was set to make $1.065 million in 2011, under current contract terms. On September 1, Johnson became the highest paid running back, agreeing to a four-year, $53.5 million contract extension, including $30 million guaranteed, with the Titans, ending his holdout.

With Hasselbeck starting, the Titans won three of their first four games, but afterwards saw a bumpy series of wins and losses. They finally finished the season 9–7, failing again to reach the playoffs, but remaining in contention to Week 17.

In 2012, the Titans finished 6–10, failing to reach the playoffs.

In 2013, after three seasons as head coach, Mike Munchak was fired after finishing the season 7–9. Bud Adams, who was the owner of the Tennessee Titans, died on October 21.

The 2014 season was the first for head coach Ken Whisenhunt. The Titans finished the season 2–14, their worst record in Tennessee Titans history, tying the Tampa Bay Buccaneers for the league's worst record, and their worse since 1994 when they were the Houston Oilers.

In 2015, the Titans had the second pick of the NFL draft. They selected quarterback Marcus Mariota, one of the best prospects of the 2015 class. It was Ken Whisenhunt's second season as head coach. Whisenhunt was fired on November 3 due to a 1–6 start, and Mike Mularkey was tabbed as the interim head coach. The Titans finished the season 3–13, tied with the Cleveland Browns for the league's worst record. After the season, the Titans fired general manager Ruston Webster. Controlling owner Amy Adams Strunk announced that the Titans had hired former Buccaneers Director of Player Personnel Jon Robinson for the open general manager job, and were going to take the interim tag off of Mularkey, making him the head coach. The Titans had the first pick in the 2016 draft, which Robinson traded to the Los Angeles Rams.

==== 2016–2021: Six straight winning seasons ====
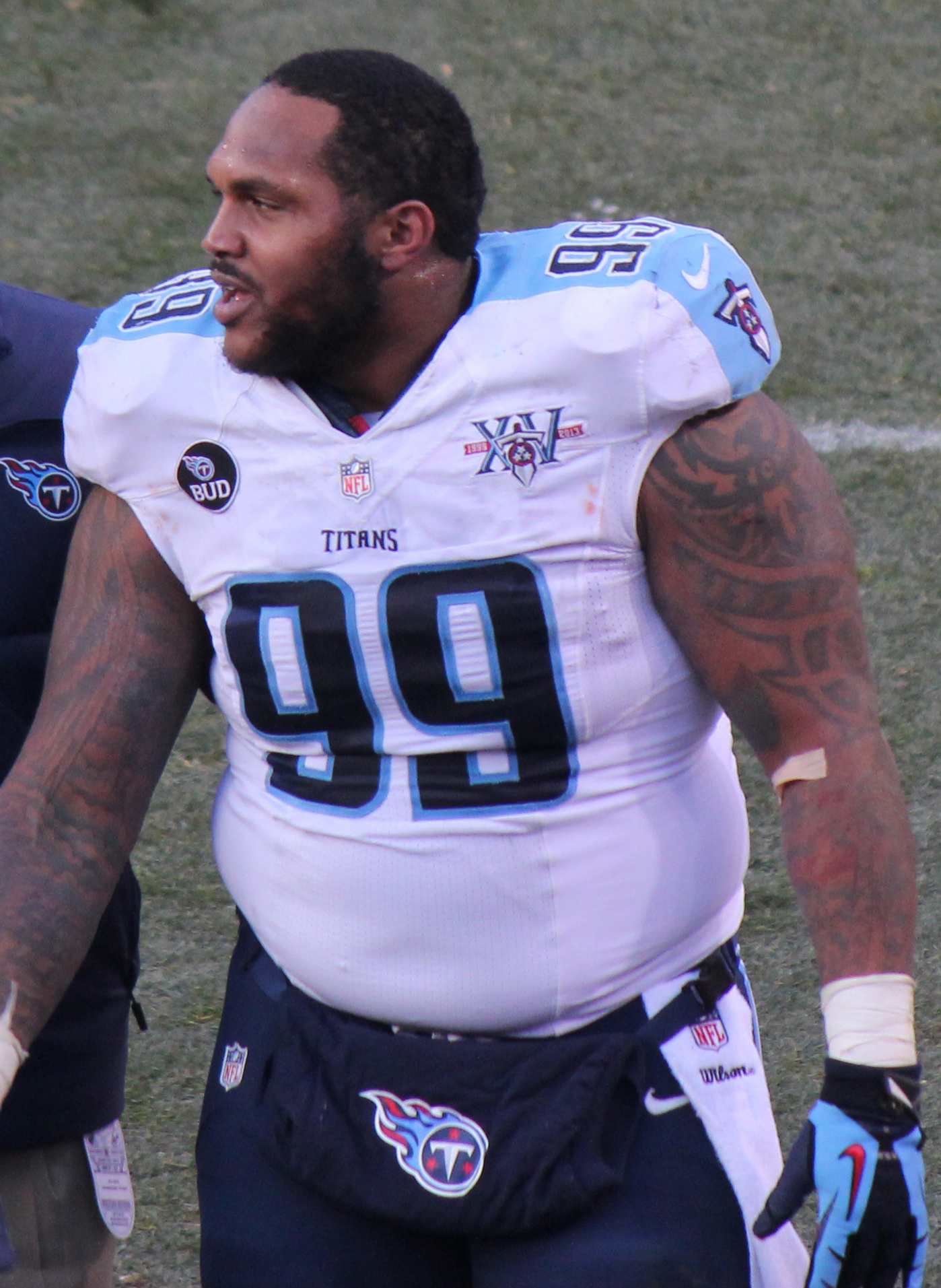
Defensive lineman Jurrell Casey made five straight Pro Bowls from 2015 to 2019.

The 2016 season was Mike Mularkey's first full season as head coach. Leading up to week 16, the Titans were tied with the Texans atop the AFC South at 8–6, with the Colts one game behind at 7–7. The Titans had lost to the Texans in week 4, and were scheduled to play them again in week 17. With the Titans thus unable to win a potential head-to-head tiebreaker with the Texans, mathematically unable to even tie the Texans in divisional record, and having already lost twice to the Colts, the Titans were not going to win the South on tiebreakers. The only chance for the Titans to win the division was to finish with a better record than the Texans and Colts. However, with the hapless 2–12 Jaguars on tap for the Titans in week 16, it seemed as though a dramatic week 17 "win-and-in" bout against the Texans was a real possibility for the Titans. However, the Titans lost to the Jaguars 38–17, as Mariota suffered a broken fibula in the third quarter, ending his season. The Texans hung on to beat the Bengals 12–10 later that day on "SNF," as Bengals kicker Randy Bullock missed a potential go-ahead 43-yard field goal with 5 seconds left in the game. The Texans thus clinched the AFC South title (the Colts had also lost earlier that day to the Raiders), rendering the Titans' week 17 game (which they nonetheless won) meaningless for their playoff hopes. The Titans finished the season 9–7, the same record as the Texans, losing the tiebreaker due to record against divisional opponents, by three games (the Titans were 2–4, the Texans were 5–1).

The 2017 season was Mike Mularkey's second full season as the Titans' head coach. In Week 17, the team defeated the Jacksonville Jaguars 15–10 to clinch one of the AFC wild card slots for the playoffs. It marked the franchise's first playoff berth since 2008. In the wild-card round, the Titans traveled to Arrowhead Stadium to face the Chiefs. The Titans looked outmatched in the first half, after which they trailed 21–3. However, the Titans ended up staging a second-half-comeback, storming back to win 22–21. The playoff run ended in the divisional round, with a 35–14 loss to the AFC No. 1 seed and eventual super bowl participant Patriots. Despite another 9–7 record & a playoff appearance, this was Mike Mularkey's final season as head coach, with Mularkey and team brass mutually agreeing to part ways after losing 35–14 in the divisional round against the New England Patriots.

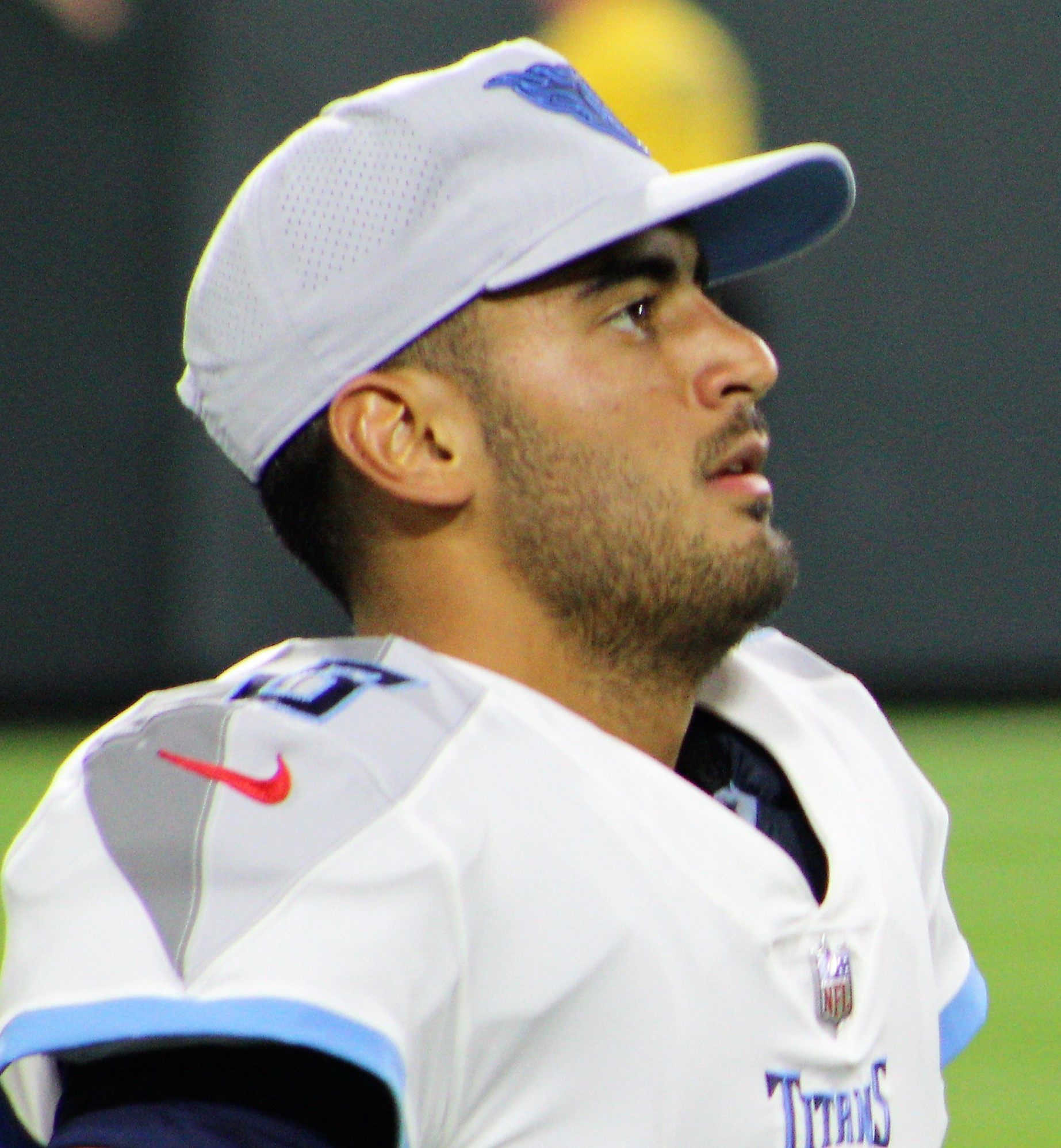
Quarterback Marcus Mariota led the Titans to the playoffs for the first time in nearly ten years in 2017.

The 2018 season was the first season under new head coach Mike Vrabel, also a welcoming of new uniforms and helmets. After making the playoffs in 2017 for the first time in nine years, the team had high hopes for 2018, expecting to make the playoffs for the second year in a row; the season was not as expected, losing the "important games" to the Buffalo Bills 12–13 in Week 5 and the Los Angeles Chargers 19–20 in Week 7, though they notably routed the New England Patriots, Vrabel's former team while playing, 34–10 in Week 10. During a Thursday Night Football game against the Jaguars in Week 14, running back Derrick Henry ran for a 99-yard touchdown, tying an NFL record with Tony Dorsett, and rushed for 238 yards and three more touchdowns in the 30–9 victory. They played the Indianapolis Colts in Week 17, needing a win to clinch the final Wild Card spot in the playoffs, but lost 33–17. Starting quarterback Marcus Mariota had been injured with a 'stinger' the week before vs the Washington Redskins, sitting out the last game of the season due to a 'risk of permanent damage', as backup Blaine Gabbert played in his place. The Titans finished the season 9–7 for the third year in a row.

The 2019 season was the 100th season of the NFL, while the 60th for the Titans. Mike Vrabel returned for his second season and Mariota for his fifth. The Titans opened up the season with a 43–13 blowout against the Cleveland Browns, with Mariota passing for three touchdowns and the defense logging three interceptions. During halftime of the 19–17 Week 2 loss against the Indianapolis Colts, the Titans retired the jersey numbers of running back Eddie George and quarterback Steve McNair. After starting the year 2–4, Mariota was benched during Week 6 in favor of backup Ryan Tannehill, who they traded for in the offseason. Tannehill would go on to win the next 7 out of 10 games, with the Titans finishing 9–7. They would make the playoffs following a 35–14 Week 17 victory over the Texans. Derrick Henry had a career year, leading the NFL in rushing yards with 1,540 and tying for the most rushing touchdowns with 16. In the playoffs, the Titans upset the defending Super Bowl champion New England Patriots at Gillette Stadium winning 20–13 in the Wildcard Round, with Henry rushing for 182 yards and a touchdown on 34 carries. The Titans then beat the heavily favored top-seeded Baltimore Ravens at M&T Bank Stadium 28–12 in the divisional round, with Henry running for 195 yards on 30 carries and throwing a touchdown. The Titans reached their first AFC Championship since 2002, and the first sixth-seed to do so since the 2010 Green Bay Packers. The Titans would lose, however, to the Kansas City Chiefs, 35–24, at Arrowhead Stadium.

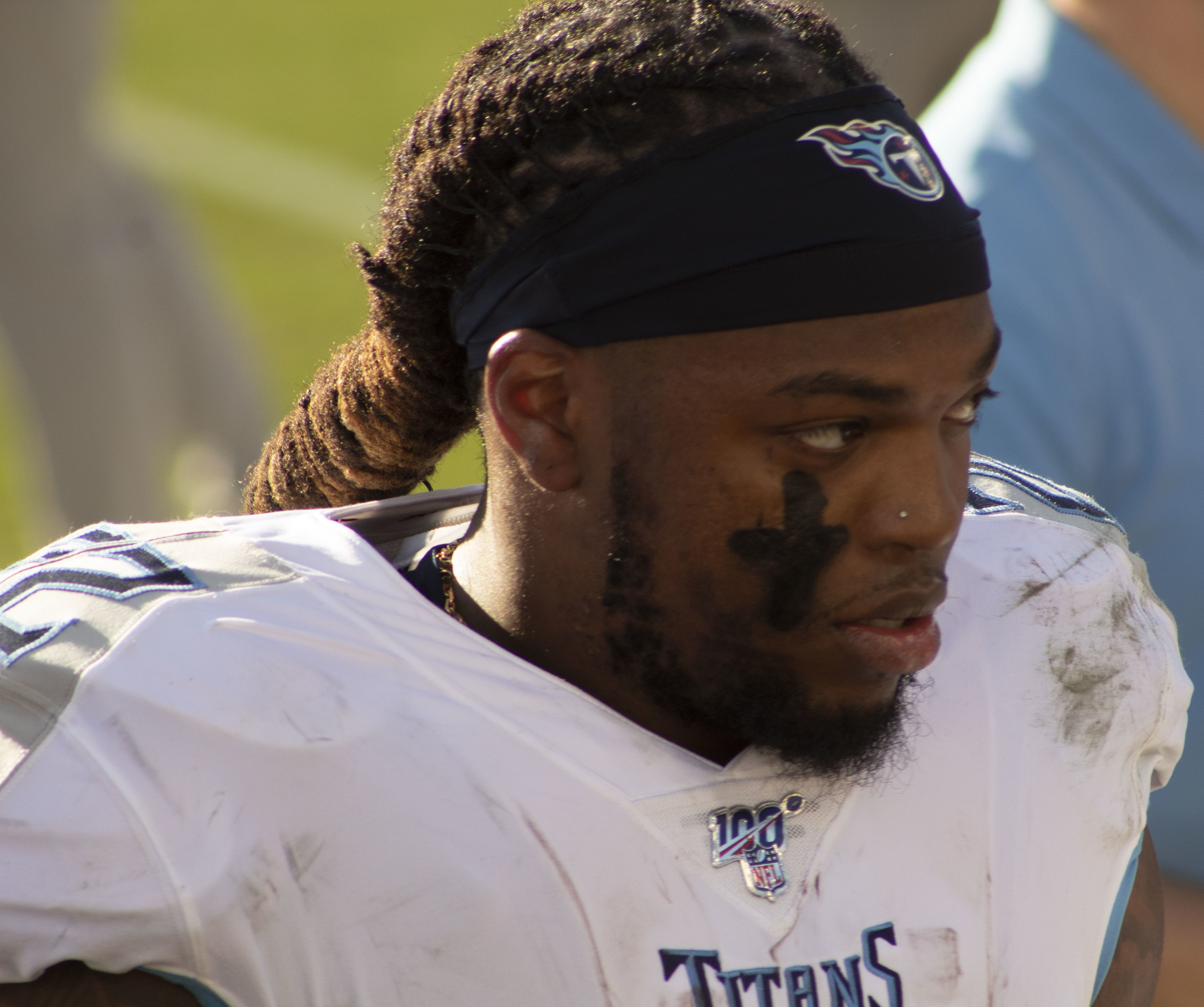
Running back Derrick Henry lead the NFL in rushing yards and rushing touchdowns back-to-back in 2019 and 2020, rushing for 2,027 yards in 2020.

The 2020 season was the 61st season for the Titans and the third under head coach Mike Vrabel. The Titans put on one of their best offensive performances in franchise history, led by Ryan Tannehill and Derrick Henry. The Titans started the season 5–0 for the first time since 2008. They then lost their next three of four and sat at 6–3 before heading into Week 11. The Titans continued their earlier success, however, and won their last five of seven games to finish 11–5. Their 46–25 victory over the Detroit Lions in Week 15 gave them their first double-digit winning season since 2008 and their first time not going 9–7 in five seasons. The Titans beat the Houston Texans 41–38 on January 3, 2021, in Week 17 to win their first division championship since 2008. In the Week 17 game, Derrick Henry rushed 35 times for 250 yards and two touchdowns, breaking 2,000 yards on the season. Henry became one of only eight players to do so, joining Chris Johnson, and made the Titans the only franchise in NFL history with two 2,000-yard rushers. Henry also led the NFL in rushing yards once again with a total of 2,027 yards, becoming the first player to win back-to-back rushing titles since LaDainian Tomlinson in 2006 and 2007. Henry also lead the league in rushing touchdowns back-to-back with 17, becoming the first player to do so since Marshawn Lynch in 2013 and 2014. A. J. Brown finished with 1,075 receiving yards for his second-straight 1,000-yard season. On January 10, 2021, the Titans hosted the Ravens at Nissan Stadium for their first home playoff game in 12 years. The Titans lost in a low-scoring 20–13 Wildcard Round to the Ravens with Derrick Henry rushing 18 times for only 40 yards and Ryan Tannehill throwing a crucial late-game interception.

The 2021 season was the Tennessee Titans' 52nd season in the National Football League, their 62nd overall, their 25th in the state of Tennessee, and their fourth under head coach Mike Vrabel. After a 34–3 win over the Miami Dolphins in Week 17, the Titans clinched the AFC South for the second consecutive season. This would be the first time since 1960–1962 that the franchise would win their division in back-to-back seasons. The Titans finished 12–5, improving on their 11–5 record from the prior year and earning the AFC's No. 1 seed in the playoffs for the first time since 2008. However, their season ended with a 19–16 loss to the eventual AFC champion Cincinnati Bengals, their third-straight playoff loss dating back three seasons.

==== 2022–present: Collapse of winning streak ====
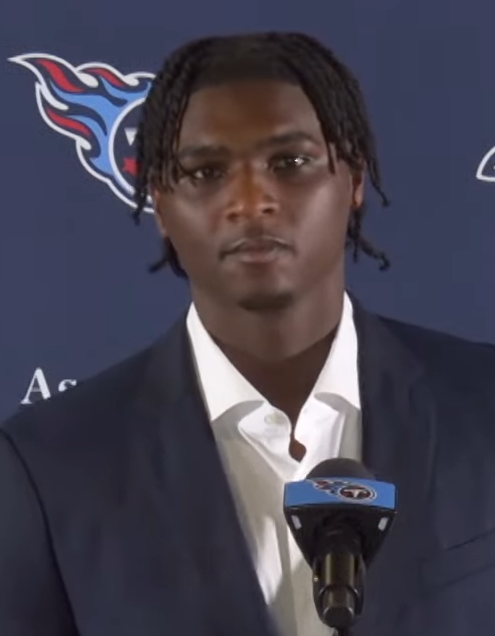
During the 2025 NFL draft, Cam Ward became the first quarterback ever selected by the Titans with the first overall pick, as well as the franchise's highest selection since the Houston Oilers drafted Earl Campbell first overall in 1978.

The Titans selected quarterback Malik Willis from Liberty in the third round of the 2022 NFL draft, the highest quarterback picked by the team since Marcus Mariota in the 2015 NFL draft. Starting quarterback Ryan Tannehill started 12 games, Willis started three as his backup, and journeyman backup Joshua Dobbs started the final two after Willis underperformed. After racing out to a 7–3 start in 2022, the Titans suffered a late-season collapse. They ended the season on a brutal seven-game losing streak, their worst losing streak since 2015. The Titans failed to improve on their 12–5 record from last season. They also suffered their first losing season since 2015 and missed the playoffs for the first time since 2018 after a loss to the Jacksonville Jaguars in the final week of the season. It was the fourth time in franchise history they missed the playoffs after having a first-round bye in the playoffs the previous season (1994, 2001, and 2009). Inconsistent play and a number of key injuries hindered the Titans throughout the season, including injuries to Tannehill who missed five games, Taylor Lewan who missed 15 games, and Harold Landry who missed the entire season. The Titans finished the season with a league-high 23 players on injured reserve.

During the 2023 NFL draft, the Titans selected quarterback Will Levis from Kentucky in the second round. Ryan Tannehill began the season as the team's starting quarterback, starting the first eight games. However, Levis took over after an injury to Tannehill, starting the final nine games. After a disappointing ending to 2022, the Titans had a worst year in 2023 as they finished at last place in the AFC South for the first time since 2015 as they went on the finish with a 6–11 record. Two highlights include their 28–27 comeback win over the eventual playoff bound Miami Dolphins after trailing 13–27 with less than 3 minutes left in the game and knocking the Jacksonville Jaguars out of the playoffs in the season finale. However, on January 9, 2024, the Titans fired Mike Vrabel after six seasons being with the team.

On January 22, 2024, the Titans hired Cincinnati Bengals offensive coordinator Brian Callahan as the team's next head coach.The team finished the 2024 season with a record of 3-14, earning them the first overall pick in the 2025 NFL draft.

With the first overall pick in the 2025 NFL draft, the Titans selected quarterback Cam Ward from Miami. In July 2025, previous starting quarterback and 2023 second-round draft pick, Will Levis, announced he would undergo season-ending surgery on his throwing shoulder.Ward was subsequently named the starter for the season. The Titans lost five of their first six games, resulting in the firing of Brian Callahan on October 13th. Mike McCoy was named interim head coach as the team once again finished 3-14.

On January 20, 2026, the Titans hired San Francisco 49ers defensive coordinator and former New York Jets head coach Robert Saleh as their next head coach. Former New York Giants head coach Brian Daboll was later hired as offensive coordinator.

== Records ==
=== Retired numbers ===
Tennessee Titans retired numbers
No.	Player	Position	Years played	Retired
9	Steve McNair	QB	1995–2005*	September 15, 2019
27	Eddie George	RB	1996–2003*	September 15, 2019
74	Bruce Matthews	OT	1983–2001*	December 8, 2002

(*)Began his tenure in Houston

=== Pro Football Hall of Fame members ===
Tennessee Titans Hall of Famers
No.	Inductee	Class	Position	Seasons
74	Bruce Matthews	2007	OT	1983–2001*
63	Mike Munchak	2001	OG; Coach	2011–13
84	Randy Moss	2018	WR	2010
68	Kevin Mawae	2019	C	2006–09
73	Steve Hutchinson	2020	OG	2012
81	Andre Johnson	2024	WR	2016

(*) Indicates Player and/or coach began their tenure with the Houston Oilers

=== Titans Hall of Fame ===
Bud Adams established the Titans/Oilers Hall of Fame after the 40th season of the franchise to honor past players and management

Elected to the Pro Football Hall of Fame

Titans Hall of Fame
No.	Name	Position	Years	Inducted
74	Bruce Matthews	OL	1983–2001*	December 8, 2002
—	Bud Adams	Owner/founder	1959–2013*	September 7, 2008
27	Eddie George	RB	1996–2003*	October 27, 2008
9	Steve McNair	QB	1995–2005*	October 27, 2008
41/89	Frank Wycheck	TE	1995–2003*	October 27, 2008

(*) Indicates This Player or Coach Began Their Tenure in Houston

=== Seasons ===
AFL Champions (1960–1969)	Super Bowl champions (1970–present)	Conference champions	Division champions	Wild card berth

Season	Team	League	Conference	Division	Regular season				Postseason Results	Awards	Head coaches
Season	Team	League	Conference	Division	Finish	Wins	Losses	Ties	Postseason Results	Awards	Head coaches
Tennessee Oilers
1997	1997	NFL	AFC	Central	3rd	8	8	0			Jeff Fisher
1998	1998	NFL	AFC	Central	2nd	8	8	0			Jeff Fisher
Tennessee Titans
1999	1999	NFL	AFC	Central	2nd	13	3	0	Won Wild Card Playoffs (Bills) 22–16; Won Divisional Playoffs (at Colts) 19–16; Won AFC Championship (at Jaguars) 33–14; Lost Super Bowl XXXIV (vs. Rams) 16–23	Jevon Kearse (DROY)	Jeff Fisher
2000	2000	NFL	AFC	Central	1st	13	3	0	Lost Divisional Playoffs (Ravens) 10–24		Jeff Fisher
2001	2001	NFL	AFC	Central	4th	7	9	0			Jeff Fisher
2002	2002	NFL	AFC	South	1st	11	5	0	Won Divisional Playoffs (Steelers) 34–31 (OT); Lost AFC Championship (at Raiders) 24–41		Jeff Fisher
2003	2003	NFL	AFC	South	2nd	12	4	0	Won Wild Card Playoffs (at Ravens) 20–17; Lost Divisional Playoffs (at Patriots) 14–17	Steve McNair (MVP)	Jeff Fisher
2004	2004	NFL	AFC	South	4th	5	11	0			Jeff Fisher
2005	2005	NFL	AFC	South	3rd	4	12	0			Jeff Fisher
2006	2006	NFL	AFC	South	2nd	8	8	0		Vince Young (OROY)	Jeff Fisher
2007	2007	NFL	AFC	South	3rd	10	6	0	Lost Wild Card Playoffs (at Chargers) 6–17		Jeff Fisher
2008	2008	NFL	AFC	South	1st	13	3	0	Lost Divisional Playoffs (Ravens) 10–13		Jeff Fisher
2009	2009	NFL	AFC	South	3rd	8	8	0		Chris Johnson (OPOY)	Jeff Fisher
2010	2010	NFL	AFC	South	4th	6	10	0			Jeff Fisher
2011	2011	NFL	AFC	South	2nd	9	7	0			Mike Munchak
2012	2012	NFL	AFC	South	3rd	6	10	0			Mike Munchak
2013	2013	NFL	AFC	South	2nd	7	9	0			Mike Munchak
2014	2014	NFL	AFC	South	4th	2	14	0			Ken Whisenhunt
2015	2015	NFL	AFC	South	4th	3	13	0			Ken Whisenhunt (1–6); Mike Mularkey (2–7)
2016	2016	NFL	AFC	South	2nd	9	7	0			Mike Mularkey
2017	2017	NFL	AFC	South	2nd	9	7	0	Won Wild Card Playoffs (at Chiefs) 22–21; Lost Divisional Playoffs (at Patriots) 14–35		Mike Mularkey
2018	2018	NFL	AFC	South	3rd	9	7	0			Mike Vrabel
2019	2019	NFL	AFC	South	2nd	9	7	0	Won Wild Card Playoffs (at Patriots) 20–13; Won Divisional Playoffs (at Ravens) 28–12; Lost AFC Championship (at Chiefs) 24–35	Ryan Tannehill (CPOY)	Mike Vrabel
2020	2020	NFL	AFC	South	1st	11	5	0	Lost Wild Card Playoffs (Ravens) 13–20	Derrick Henry (OPOY)	Mike Vrabel
Total						200	184	0	(1997–2020, includes only regular season)		
Total						8	9	0	(1997–2020, includes only playoffs)		
Total						208	193	0	(1997–2020, includes both regular season and playoffs)		
