= Manilla Powers =

American actress

Manilla Powers was an American actress. She was a star of variety shows, revues, vaudeville, and musical comedies in the 1920s and 1930s. She was born and raised in Janesville, Wisconsin.

== Early aptitude ==
Manilla was one of six siblings born to Michael Powers, a harness maker, and his wife, Josephine, a dressmaker. In 1915, Manilla, aged 17, was selected as one of six female students chosen to represent Janesville High School in a triangular girl's debating league. She was class vice-president as a high school sophomore, won a recorder medal as a junior and graduated in 1916.

Her first appearance as an entertainer was in March 1915. During the afternoon program of a meeting of the Janesville, Wisconsin Summer Club of Home Economics, she gave two songs. Powers sang Echoes of Love and Roses After Rain before an audience that was very receptive. She participated in the recital of Marguerite O'Brien in Rockford, Illinois the following November. Powers returned to Janesville from Chicago, Illinois in September 1917. She had studied music for several months under the tutelage of Karlton Hackett.

In November 1918 Powers and Alice Thomas performed songs at a bazaar in Janesville. It was organized to raise money for the Fatherless Children of France. In August 1919 Powers came back to her hometown, this time from New York City. She gave the second part of a program at the Janesville Country Club. Her teacher in New York forecast a bright future for Powers. She sang The Lord Is My Light during a service at the Janesville Baptist Church in 1919.

== Stage entertainer ==
Powers was in Artists and Models at the Winter Garden Theater in New York City in November 1927. The program was a revue in two acts with twenty-six scenes. The principals included Ted Lewis and the German comedian Jack Pearl. Powers was among the 100 Winter Garden Girls-100 which Lewis assembled along with his musical clowns. In September 1931 she replaced Alice McKenzie as "Sonia" in The Merry Widow. The production was staged at Erlanger's Theater on Broadway. Erlanger's was built by Warren and Wetmore for the Theatrical Syndicate in 1927. Powers performed in The Red Robe (1928) at the Shubert Theater, New Haven, Connecticut. Joining her in the comedy show were Gloria Foy, Peggy Dolan, and John Goldsworthy.

Powers traveled with a troupe of vaudeville actors to Forest Park (St. Louis) in 1932. They staged a romance of 20th century turkey, The Rose of Stamboul. George Hassell, Barbara Newberry, Harry K. Morton, and Leonard Ceeley were in the cast. Nothing is known of Powers' life after this point, or when and where she died.
