= John McCoy =

John McCoy may refer to:

- John McCoy (musician) (born 1950), British bass guitarist
- John McCoy (Irish politician) (born 1940), Irish Progressive Democrats politician 1987–1989
- John B. McCoy (born 1943), American businessman
- John Calvin McCoy (1811–1889), American businessman and pioneer
- John W. McCoy (1910–1989), American artist
- John McCoy (American politician) (1943–2023), American Indian Washington State Senator
- John E. McCoy, United States National Guard general

== Fictional characters ==
- Jack McCoy (John James McCoy), fictional district attorney in the television drama Law & Order

== See also ==
- Jack McCoy (disambiguation)
