= Eliza Eubanks Peterson Johnson =

American temperance leader and suffragist (1874–1966)

- Born: December 12, 1874; Waskom, Texas
- Died: May 31, 1966 (aged 91); Philadelphia, Pennsylvania

Eliza Eubanks Peterson Johnson (1874–1966) was an American leader in the woman's temperance movement and suffragist.

Johnson was born on December 12, 1874, in Waskom, Texas. The child of an alcoholic father, Johnson became active in the Colored Division of the Woman's Christian Temperance Union (WTCU) in Texas. She served as state president of the segregated African American division of the Texas and went on to become superintendent of the national Colored Division of the WTCU after Lucy Thurman stepped down from the post. Johnson was an advocate of women's suffrage primarily as a way to help the passage of the Eighteenth Amendment to the United States Constitution (prohibition of alcohol).

Johnson was married twice. She married her second husband, insurance broker Christopher Johnson, in 1919 and the couple settled in Mobile, Alabama.

Johnson died om May 31, 1966, in Philadelphia, Pennsylvania.
