= Joseph A. Craig High School =

Public school in Wisconsin, US

Location
- 401 S Randall St; Janesville, Wisconsin; United States; 42.68152°N 89.00074°W

Information
- Type: Public
- Established: 1923
- Oversight: Janesville School District
- Principal: Alison Bjoin
- Teaching staff: 107.14 (FTE)
- Grades: 9–12
- Enrollment: 1,467 (2023–2024)
- Student to teacher ratio: 13.69
- Colors: Blue & White
- Athletics conference: WIAA Big Eight Conference
- Nickname: Big Blue
- Team name: Cougars
- Rival: George S. Parker High School
- Newspaper: The Criterion
- Yearbook: The Phoenix
- Website: Craig High School

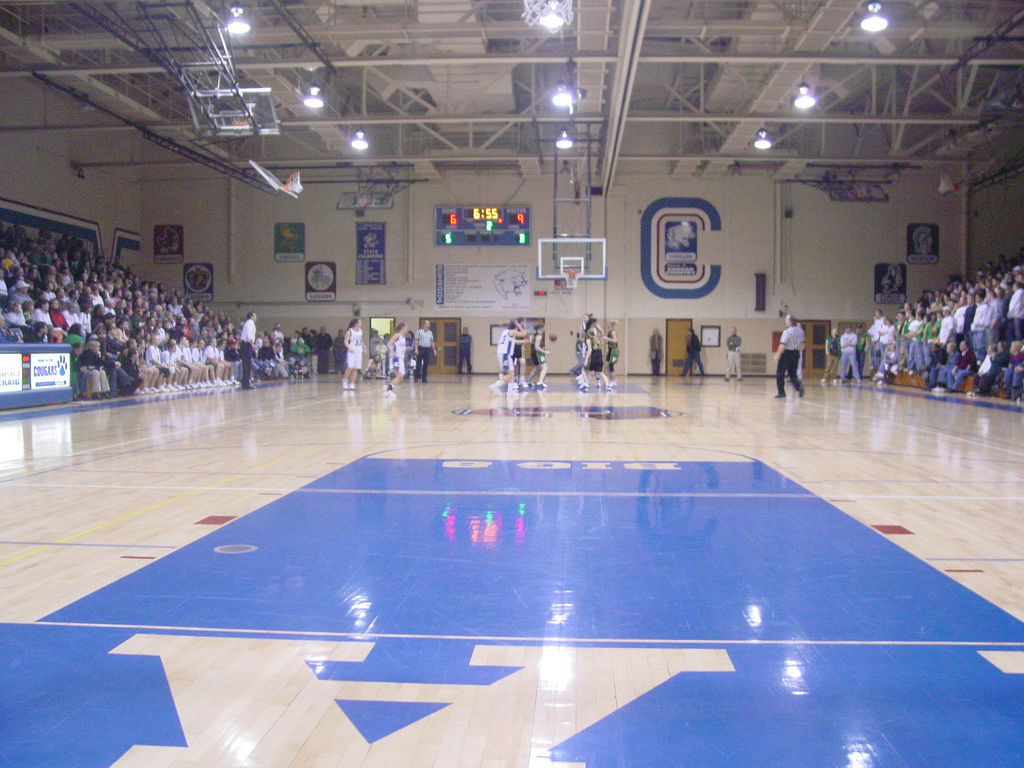
Girls' basketball game with crosstown rival Parker during the 2004–2005 season

Joseph A. Craig High School is a public high school located in the city of Janesville, Wisconsin. Craig, a part of the School District of Janesville, has a student enrollment of approximately 1,800. Located on the east side of Janesville, it is named after Joseph A. Craig, who was instrumental in attracting the General Motors Janesville Assembly Plant to the city.

== History ==
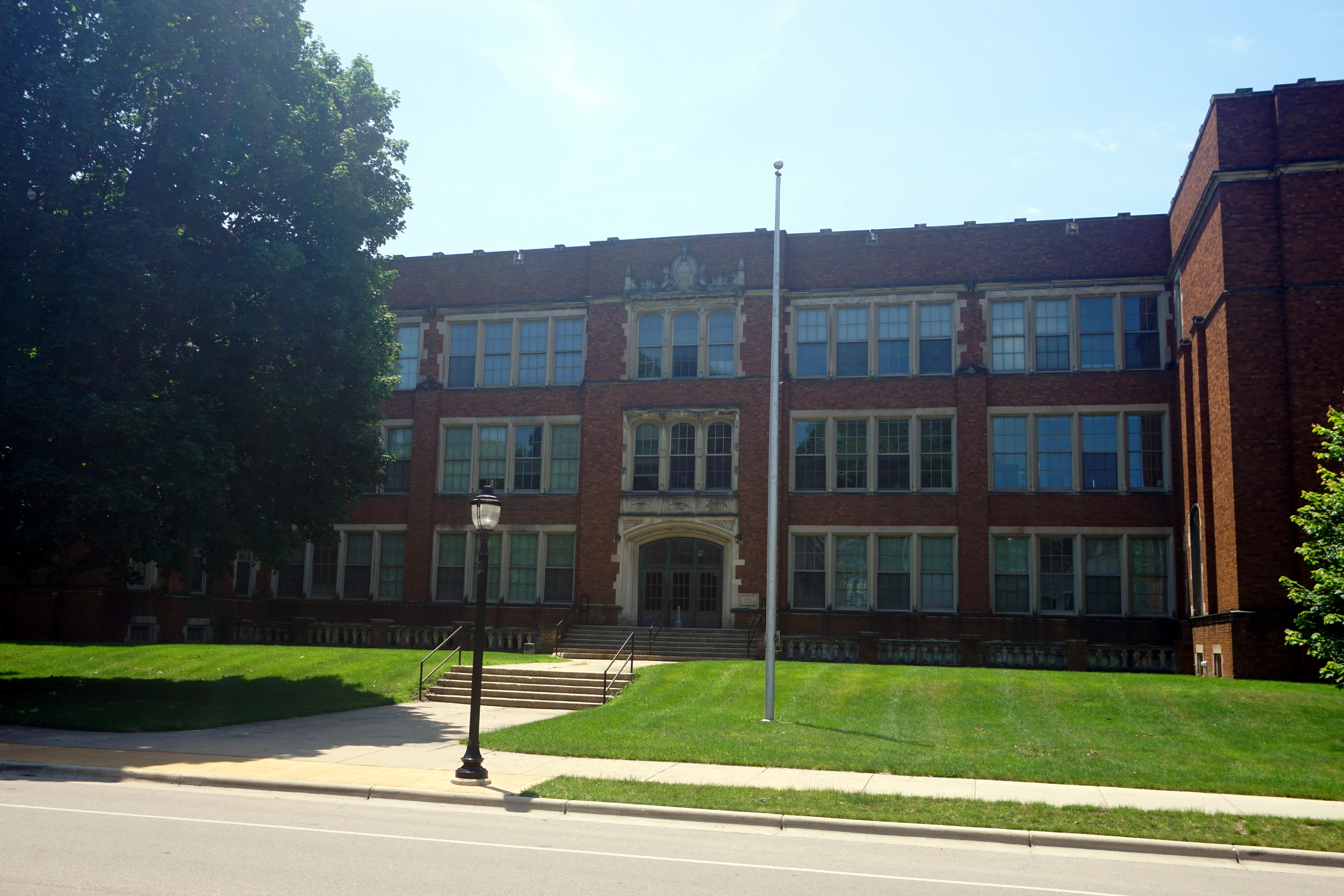
The original Janesville High School, built in 1923.

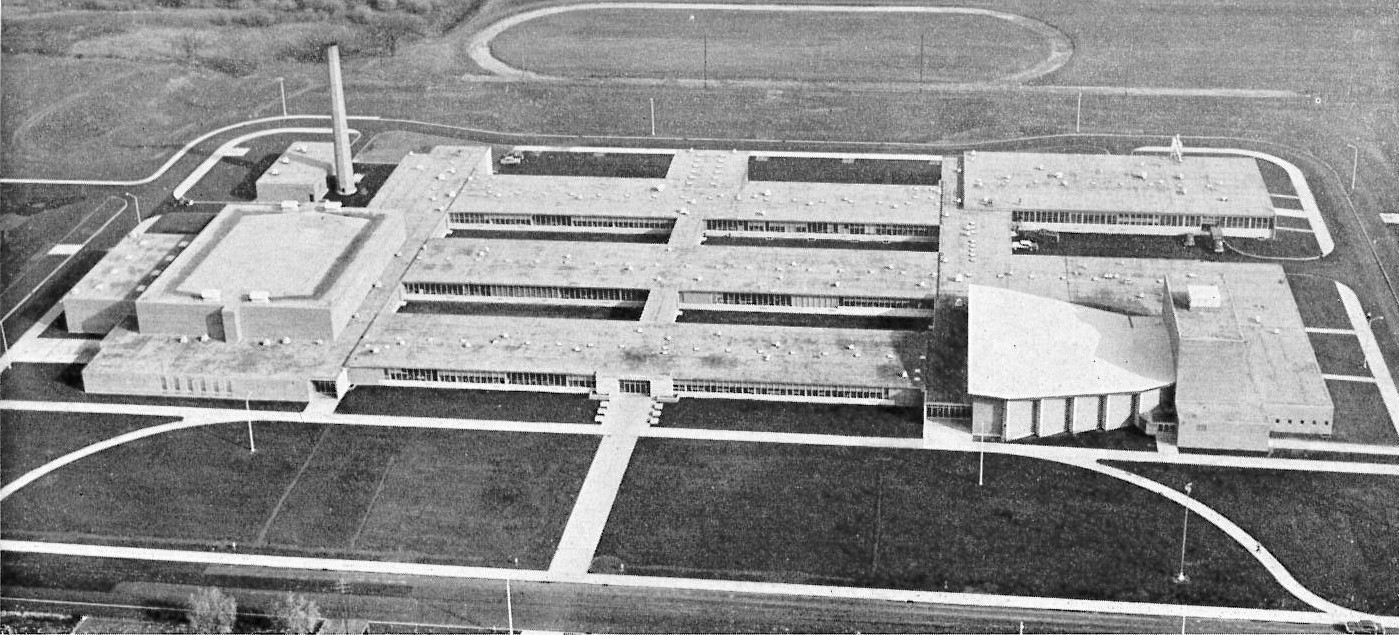
Janesville Senior High School, 1955

The original Janesville High School opened up in 1923 downtown at the corner of Main and Racine Streets. The current building opened in 1955, with the former high school becoming a middle school until 1999, when it was adapted into apartment use. The school was later renamed Joseph A. Craig High School in 1967 with the opening of George S. Parker High School on the west side of Janesville.

== Athletics ==
The school sports teams compete in the Big Eight Conference. State level competition is governed by the Wisconsin Interscholastic Athletic Association (WIAA).

=== State championships ===
- Baseball: 1983, 1984, 1998, 2015
- Cross country (girls): 1991

==== as Janesville High School ====
- Cross country (boys): 1950, 1961, 1962
- Golf (boys): 1951, 1953, 1963
- Swimming & diving (boys): 1955, 1961
- Wrestling: 1955 (co-state champion with Madison East)

=== Conference affiliation history ===
- Big Six Conference (1925–1929)
- Big Seven Conference (1929–1930)
- Big Eight Conference (1930–present)

== Performing arts ==
Craig has a varsity-level competitive show choirs, the "Spotlighters". The choir also hosts their own competition, the Spotlight Spectacular. Spotlighters have a history of placing well at competitions, even winning some championships.

== Notable alumni ==
- Keeanu Benton, NFL nose tackle for the Pittsburgh Steelers
- Sue Conley, Wisconsin state legislator
- Edward Creutz, physicist
- Russ Feingold, United States Senator (1993–2011)
- Carol Sorenson Flenniken, amateur golfer
- Tucker Fredricks, speed skater
- Israel Hanukoglu, biochemist
- Tom Klawitter, professional baseball player
- Tad Kubler, lead guitarist for rock band The Hold Steady
- Pete Lee, stand-up comedian
- Kerwin Mathews, actor
- Max Maxfield, Wyoming State Auditor (1999–2007) and 20th Secretary of State of Wyoming (2007–2015)
- John E. McCoy, Major General, Air National Guard
- Erin Murphy, majority Leader of the Minnesota Senate, District 64 Representative
- Andrew Poppas, General, Army
- Manilla Powers, actress, vaudevillian
- Paul Ryan, 54th Speaker of the United States House of Representatives (2015–2019) and U.S. Representative (1999–2019)
- Bryan Steil, member of the U.S. House of Representatives (2019 to present)
- Bob Strampe, professional baseball player
- Randy Udell, Wisconsin state legislator
- Clay Weatherly, Indy car driver
