= General McCoy =

General McCoy may refer to:

- Frank Ross McCoy (1874–1954), U.S. Army major general
- John E. McCoy (fl. 1970s–2010s), U.S. Air National Guard major general
- Robert Bruce McCoy (1867–1926), U.S. Army National Guard major general
