= Mary Eleanora McCoy =

American philanthropist (1846–1923)

- Born: Mary Eleanora Delaney; January 26, 1846; Lawrenceburg, Indiana, US
- Died: November 17, 1923 (aged 77); Detroit, Michigan, US
- Spouse: Elijah McCoy (m. 1873)

Mary Eleanora McCoy (née Delaney; January 26, 1846 – November 17, 1923) was an American philanthropist, organizer, and clubwoman. She is known for organizing the Michigan State Association of Colored Women, a chapter of the National Association of Colored Women (NACW).

== Biography ==
McCoy née Delaney was born in 1846 in Lawrenceburg, Indiana. Sources differ on her exact birth date: January 26, 1846 or perhaps January 7, 1846. She was born in an Underground Railroad station, with one source naming her parents as "Jacob C. and Eliza Ann (Montgomery) Delaney, perhaps escaped slaves". She married twice, first to Henry Brownlow and then to Elijah McCoy. Elijah McCoy was an inventor and the subject of the phrase the real McCoy.

The McCoys settled in Detroit in the early 1880s. Mary McCoy was an active clubwoman. She was a member of the Twentieth Century Club of Detroit, the National Association for the Advancement of Colored People (NAACP), the Lydian Association of Detroit, and the Willing Workers. With Lucy Thurman, she organized the Michigan State Association of Colored Women (a chapter of the National Association of Colored Women (NACW)). Her philanthropy included participation in the establishment of the Sojourner Truth Memorial Association of Michigan which provided University of Michigan scholarships to children of former slaves. She served as vice president. She also funded the McCoy Home for Colored Children, and established the Phyllis Wheatley Home for Aged Colored Women in Detroit, serving as president.

By the early 1900s, McCoy was working for women's suffrage. She was a member of the Independent Women Voters and advocated for suffrage through her ongoing association with the NACW. In 1901, she was elected to the board of directs of the Phyllis Wheatley Home for Aged Colored Women. She marched in the 1913 Woman Suffrage Parade in Washington D.C. In 1920, she attended the National American Woman Suffrage Association's Victory Convention in Chicago.

== Personal Challenges ==
McCoy never raised a child of her own. According to the 1900 census, she had given birth to a baby who died soon after. McCoy also dealt with domestic violence. According to the Detroit Free Press, she filed charges against her husband for abuse, but he was later acquitted. The charitable home she founded and ran, which provided shelter for children of working mothers who were abandoned by their fathers, also faced foreclosure.

However, despite these difficulties, she persisted and her work for women rights continued. In 1915, McCoy took part in the celebration of the half centennial of the Emancipation Proclamation in Chicago, and in 1916, she represented the Michigan State Federation of Colored Women's Clubs at a meeting in Chicago.

== Death ==
McCoy died on November 17, 1923, in Detroit in a car accident. In 2012, she was inducted into the Michigan Women's Hall of Fame and in 2016 the Mary E. McCoy Post Office Building was dedicated in Detroit.
