= 1964 NASCAR Pacific Coast Late Model Division =

11th season of the NASCAR Pacific Coast Late Model Division

Seasons
- ← 1963 1965 →

The 1964 NASCAR Pacific Coast Late Model Division was the 11th season of the series. The title was won by Ron Hornaday Sr., his second in the series and second in succession.

== Schedule and results ==
The 1964 season included 29 individual races, although Ascot Park hosted six races, Portland Speedway hosted four races, and Evergreen Speedway and Jantzen Beach Arena hosted two races each. The race at Riverside International Raceway was in combination with the NASCAR Grand National Series.

Date	Name	Racetrack	Location	Winner
November 17, 1963	†	Clovis Speedway	Clovis, California	Don Noel
January 19	Motor Trend 500	Riverside International Raceway	Riverside, California	Dan Gurney
March 15	†	San Jose Speedway	San Jose, California	Carl Joiner
March 29	†	Portland Speedway	Portland, Oregon	Bill Amick
April 19	Evergreen 200	Evergreen Speedway	Monroe, Washington	Dick Bown
April 26	†	Yakima Speedway	Yakima, Washington	Bill Amick
May 3	PCLM 50 Miles	Eugene Speedway	Eugene, Oregon	Dick Bown
May 17	Cotati Challenge	Cotati Raceway	Cotati, California	Darel Dieringer
May 24	Portland 150 Laps	Portland Speedway	Portland, Oregon	Bill Amick
May 30	†	Redwood Acres Speedway	Eureka, California	Bill Amick
June 6	Ascot Park 200 Lappers	Ascot Park	Gardena, California	Bill Amick
June 14	†	Tacoma Speedway	Tacoma, Washington	Bill Amick
June 20	†	Salem Speedway	Salem, Oregon	Jack D. McCoy
June 21	†	Portland Speedway	Portland, Oregon	Ron Hornaday
July 4	†	Jantzen Beach Arena	Portland, Oregon	Bill Amick
July 12	†	Evergreen Speedway	Monroe, Washington	Bill Amick
July 17	†	Saugus Speedway	Saugus, California	Ron Hornaday
July 18	†	Bakersfield Speedway	Oildale, California	Bill Amick
August 1	Ascot 200	Ascot Park	Gardena, California	Marvin Porter
August 9	†	Oregon International Raceway	Goshen, Oregon	Ron Hornaday
August 15	Ascot 100	Ascot Park	Gardena, California	Bob Perry
August 23	†	Southwest Washington Fairgrounds	Chehalis, Washington	Ron Hornaday
September 6	†	Jantzen Beach Arena	Portland, Oregon	Jack D. McCoy
September 7	†	Ascot Park	Gardena, California	Bill Amick
September 19	†	Ascot Park	Gardena, California	Ron Hornaday
September 27	†	Portland Speedway	Portland, Oregon	Jack D. McCoy
October 4	Sacramento 100	California State Fairgrounds Race Track	Sacramento, California	Bob Ross
October 17	Ascot Park 200	Ascot Park	Gardena, California	Dick Bown

† This race was not given a name
