= Carl Joiner =

American racing driver (1924–2000)

- Born: Carl Imes Joiner; December 5, 1924; Portland, Oregon, U.S.
- Died: March 16, 2000 (aged 75)

NASCAR Cup Series career
- 17 races run over 12 years
- Best finish: 77th (1972)
- First race: 1957 Race 31 (Portland)
- Last race: 1977 Winston Western 500 (Riverside)
Wins	Top tens	Poles
0	3	0

ARCA Menards Series West career
- 103 races run over 18 years
- Best finish: 6th (1964)
- First race: 1957 Race 18 (Portland)
- Last race: 1977 Winston Western 500 (Riverside)
- First win: 1964 Race 3 (San Jose)
- Last win: 1971 Medford 100 (Medford)
Wins	Top tens	Poles
2	57	6
- Statistics up to date as of September 14, 2026.

Carl Imes Joiner (December 5, 1924 – March 16, 2000) was an American professional stock car racing driver. He competed in the NASCAR Winston Cup Series and NASCAR Winston West Series between 1957 and 1977.

== Racing career ==
Joiner made his NASCAR Grand National Series and NASCAR Pacific Coast Late Model Division in a combination race at Portland Speedway in 1957, finishing 16th.

Joiner made three Pacific Coast Late Model Division starts in 1961, scoring two top-tens. Two of these races were in combination with the Grand National Series, with Joiner's ninth-place finish at the California State Fairgrounds Race Track being his first top-ten in the series.

Joiner made two Pacific Coast Late Model starts in 1962, scoring a best result of 13th.

Joiner's only NASCAR start of 1963 was the combination race at Riverside International Raceway, where he crashed out and finished 26th.

Joiner made eighteen starts in the Pacific Coast Late Model Division in 1964, scoring his first career win in his first start of the season at San Jose Speedway and thirteen total top-tens. He finished a career best sixth in points. Joiner also made his USAC Stock Car Series debut in 1964, finishing eighth at Hanford Motor Speedway.

In 1965, Joiner made nine Pacific Coast Late Model starts, scoring six top-tens and his first career pole. He also returned to the USAC Stock Car Series at Hanford, finishing eleventh.

In seven Pacific Coast Late Model races in 1966, Joiner scored five more top-tens and another pole. This included a combination race at Riverside, where he finished 33rd.

Joiner made five Pacific Coast Late Model starts in 1967, scoring two consecutive poles and four top-tens.

Joiner made five starts again in 1968, scoring three top-tens. He also ran the Grand National race at Riverside but would retire with overheating issues after three laps and finish 41st.

Joiner made five Pacific Coast Late Model attempts in 1969, failing to qualify at Jantzen Beach Arena and scoring one top-ten at Douglas County Speedway.

Joiner made seven starts in the renamed Grand National West in 1970, scoring three top-tens. He finished 37th in the combination race at Riverside due to rear end issues.

Joiner made fourteen starts in the renamed Winston West Series in 1971, scoring his second and final career win at Medford Speedway and eight top-tens. His Winston West schedule included three combination races with the renamed Winston Cup Series, where he finished eighth and 31st at Riverside and 15th at Ontario Motor Speedway.

Joiner made thirteem Winston West starts in 1972, scoring eight top-tens. He finished twelfth in the first Riverside combination race and scored his lone Winston Cup top-five in the second, finishing fifth; he failed to qualify at Ontario.

Joiner made six Winston West starts in 1973, scoring two top-tens. He finished 33rd in the Winston Cup season opener at Riverside.

In 1974, Joiner made two Winston West starts, scoring his final top-five with a third-place finish at Evergreen Speedway and scoring his final pole the following race at Portland.

Joiner's lone standalone West Series start of 1975 came at Portland, where he scored his final top-ten with a seventh-place result. He finished 22nd in the combination race at Riverside.

Joiner made two NASCAR starts in 1976, both combination races, where he finished 20th at Riverside and 31st at Ontario.

Joiner's final start came in 1977, where he finished 31st in the season-opening Riverside combination race.
