= Lucy Thurman =

American temperance activist

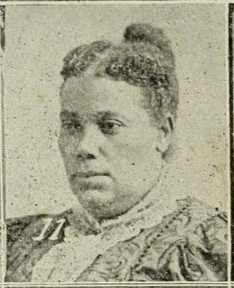
Lucy Thurman, in a 1902 publication

Lucy Thurman (October 22, 1849 – March 29, 1918) was a national temperance lecturer from Jackson, Michigan.

== Biography ==
Lucinda "Lucy" Smith was born on October 22, 1849, in Oshawa, Ontario, Canada to Nehemiah Henry Smith and Katherine Campbell. In 1866, she left home at 17 when she met Frederick Douglass and Dr. William Wells Brown in Rochester, New York. With their help, she began teaching at a school in Maryland. She moved to Jackson, Michigan in 1869 and married Henry William Simpson. She remarried after Simpson's death to Frank Thurman in 1883.

In 1873, she began advocating for the development temperance work for black people at the Women's Temperance Crusade in Toledo, Ohio. When the Woman's Christian Temperance Union (WCTU) was formed a year later, she became its only black founding member. In 1883, she successfully convinced the WCTU to establish a National Department of Colored Work. In 1893, Thurman became the national superintendent of "Colored Work" at the WCTU. She was succeeded by Eliza Eubanks Peterson Johnson. In 1898, she cofounded the Michigan Association of Colored Women's Clubs with friend Mary Eleanora McCoy and served as its first president. The new organization was under the umbrella of the National Association of Colored Women's Clubs (NACWC) and was dedicated to welfare, rights, and education of black women and families.

She was elected as the third national president (1904-1908) of the NACW, succeeding Josephine Silone Yates. Under her leadership, she helped to establish a Temperance Department, passed resolutions and actively worked in support of anti-lynching campaigns, juvenile courts, and the National Association for the Protection of Colored Women and Girls.

== Death and legacy ==
Thurman died in Jackson, Michigan on March 29, 1918.

The Lucy Thurman Young Women's Christian Association Building in Detroit is named for her and opened in 1933. The building received a state historical designation in 1993.

In 1992, she was inducted into the Michigan Women's Hall of Fame.

== In popular culture ==
A portrait of Thurman, painted by Detroit artist Telitha Cumi Bowens, was included in the 1988/89 exhibit Ain't I A Woman at the Museum of African American History, Detroit. The exhibit featured a dozen prominent Black women from the state of Michigan, including the Honorable Cora M. Brown, Ethelene Jones Crockett, M.D., and musician Madame Emma Azalia Hackley.
