= The real McCoy =

Idiom and metaphor in the English language

"The real McCoy" is an idiom and metaphor used in much of the English-speaking world to mean "the real thing" or "the genuine article", e.g. "he's the real McCoy". The phrase has been the subject of numerous false etymologies.

== History ==
The phrase "The real McCoy" may be a corruption of the Scots "The real MacKay", first recorded in 1856 as: "A drappie o' the real MacKay" ("a drop of the real MacKay"). This appeared in a poem, "Deil's Hallowe'en", published in Glasgow and is widely accepted as the phrase's origin. A letter written by the Scottish author Robert Louis Stevenson in 1883 contains the phrase, "He's the real Mackay". In 1935, New Zealand mystery writer Ngaio Marsh presented a character in Enter a Murderer who muses whether gun cartridges used in a play were "the real Mackay."

In 1881, the expression was used in James S. Bond's The Rise and Fall of the 'Union Club'; Or, Boy Life in Canada. A character says, "By jingo! yes; so it will be. It's the 'real McCoy,' as Jim Hicks says. Nobody but a devil can find us there."

The expression has also been associated with Elijah McCoy's oil-drip cup invention, patented in 1872. One theory is that railroad engineers looking to avoid inferior copies would request it by name, inquiring if a locomotive was fitted with "the real McCoy system". This possible origin is mentioned in Elijah McCoy's biography at the National Inventors Hall of Fame. The original appearance of this claim in print can be traced to an advertisement which appeared in the December 1966 issue of Ebony. The ad, for Old Taylor Bourbon whiskey, ends with the tag line: "...but the most famous legacy McCoy left his country was his name."

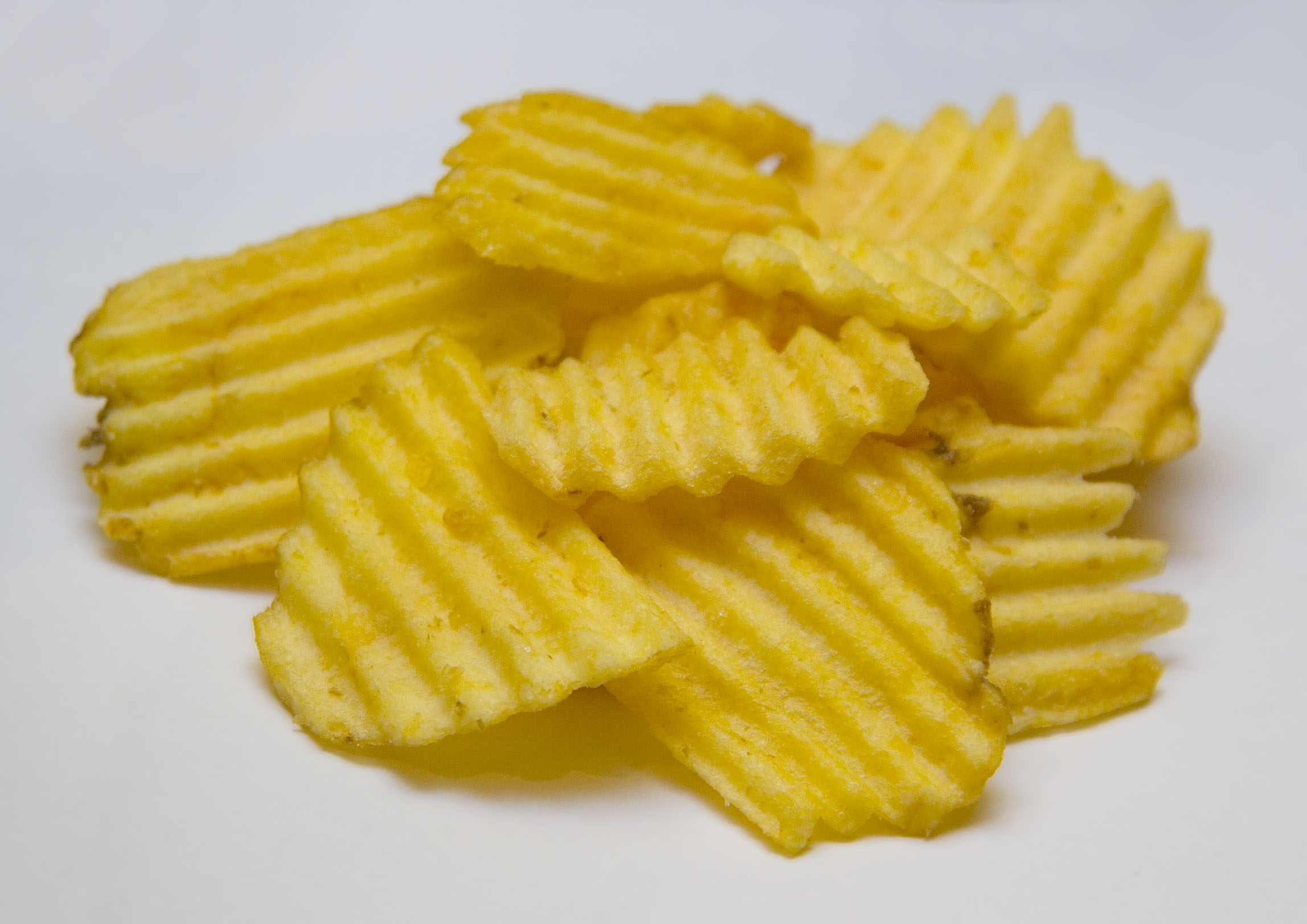
McCoy's crinkle-cut crisps, produced in the UK since 1985, were marketed under the slogan "The Real McCoy's – Accept No Imitations"

In January of 1920, during the U.S. prohibition of alcohol, famous rum-runner William McCoy became the first to fill a boat with alcohol in the Caribbean, sail it up to New York City, and legally act as a floating liquor store three miles off shore. McCoy was careful to always stay outside the three mile limit, which was international waters in the early days of U.S. Prohibition. McCoy made a name for himself because he never adulterated the alcohol. While copy-cat rum runners would dilute their alcohol with chemicals like turpentine, wood alcohol and prune juice, McCoy never did. The sullied products were nicknamed "Booze," "Hooch" and "Rot Gut," while McCoy’s quality spirits became known as "The Real McCoy."

In the 1996 documentary The Line King, caricaturist Al Hirschfeld attributed the phrase to his friend, 1930s pioneer radio host George Braidwood McCoy, who proved he could live off the land without paying for food or rent. During the 1939 World's Fair he ate free food from the exhibitions, slept for free at the Royal Scot, shaved using the new electric shavers at the display exhibits, and earned spending money by selling his story to Life. During the Second World War, McCoy could be heard broadcasting his radio show in 1944 Rome, where he would sign off saying: "This is Sergeant George (The Real) McCoy folding his microphone and silently stealing away."

Alternative attributions include:

- A dispute between two branches of the Scots Clan Mackay over who was rightful leader. Lord Reay headed one branch and he came to be known as the Reay Mackay which migrated to 'the real McCoy'. See Huistean Du Mackay, 13th of Strathnaver for information about the dispute.
- Joseph McCoy (1837–1915) was mayor of Abilene, Kansas and styled himself 'the real McCoy'.
- The Hatfield–McCoy feud

=== Kid McCoy ===
In the United States, the phrase became associated with boxer Kid McCoy (1872 - 1940). One writer suggested that "It looks very much – without being able to say for sure – as though the term was originally the real Mackay, but became converted to the real McCoy in the U.S., either under the influence of Kid McCoy, or for some other reason."

=== Pearl Harbor ===
On December 7th 1941 at or around 9:00 a.m. local time, KGMB station manager Webley Edwards was the first to broadcast the attack on Pearl Harbor by the Japanese including this phrase:

"Alright now, listen carefully. The island of Oahu is being attacked by enemy planes. The center of this attack is Pearl Harbor, but the planes are attacking airfields as well. We are under attack. There seems to be no doubt about it. Do not go out on the streets. Keep under cover and keep calm. Some of you may think that this is just another military maneuver. This is not a maneuver. This is the real McCoy! I repeat, we have been attacked by enemy planes. The mark of the rising sun has been seen on the wings of these planes and they are attacking Pearl Harbor at this moment. Now keep your radio on and tell your neighbor to do the same. Keep off the streets and highways unless you have a duty to perform. Please don’t use your telephone unless you absolutely have to do so. All of these phone facilities are needed for emergency calls. Now standby all military personnel and all police -- police regulars and reserves. Report for duty at once. I repeat, we are under attack by enemy planes. The mark of the rising sun has been seen on these planes. Many of you have been asking if this is a maneuver. This is not a maneuver. This is the real McCoy."

== See also ==
- No true Scotsman
- True Scotsman
