= Pete Lee (comedian) =

American comedian

Lee in 2026

Peter Lee is an American stand-up comedian.

== Early life ==
Lee was born in Janesville, Wisconsin. He graduated from Janesville Craig High School in 1995 before attending the University of Minnesota. Following college, Lee remained in Minneapolis for several years.

== Career ==
He is a regular performer and guest on The Tonight Show Starring Jimmy Fallon. Lee has also been featured on Comedy Central Presents and This Week at the Comedy Cellar. In July 2021, his special, Pete Lee: Tall, Dark and Pleasant, premiered on Showtime.

== Personal life ==
Lee was previously in a relationship with fellow comedian Nikki Glaser. In 2025, Lee lost his home in the Palisades Fire.
