= Jack McCoy (footballer) =

Australian rules footballer, born 1910

Personal information
- Full name: John McCoy
- Nickname: Tim
- Born: 30 November 1911; Collingwood, Victoria
- Died: 1 April 1976 (aged 64); Moe, Victoria
- Original team: Collingwood Seconds / Yarram
- Height: 183 cm (6 ft 0 in)
- Weight: 76 kg (168 lb)

Playing career^{1}
Years	Club	Games (Goals)
1934–35	St Kilda	9 (0)
1936	Launceston	
1937–38	Sandringham (VFA)	31 (0)
- ^{1} Playing statistics correct to the end of 1938.

John McCoy (30 November 1911 – 1 April 1976) was an Australian rules footballer who played with St Kilda in the Victorian Football League (VFL).

He later served in the Australian Army during World War II.
