= Jack McCoy (racing driver, born 1928) =

American racing driver (1928–2020)

Jack D. McCoy
- Born: Jack Dwight McCoy; January 11, 1928; Tacoma, Washington, U.S.
- Died: June 24, 2020 (aged 92); Milwaukie, Oregon, U.S.
- Cause of death: Illness

NASCAR Cup Series career
- 10 races run over 5 years
- Best finish: 54th (1958)
- First race: 1956 Race 5 (Phoenix)
- Last race: 1963 Golden State 400 (Riverside)
Wins	Top tens	Poles
0	2	0

ARCA Menards Series West career
- 34 races run over 7 years
- Best finish: 5th (1964)
- First race: 1956 Race 2 (Phoenix)
- Last race: 1966 Firestone 200 (Portland)
- First win: 1964 Race 13 (Salem)
- Last win: 1964 Race 27 (Portland)
Wins	Top tens	Poles
3	16	3
- Statistics up to date as of October 22, 2026.

Jack Dwight McCoy (January 11, 1928 – June 24, 2020) was an American professional stock car racing driver. He competed in the NASCAR Grand National Series and NASCAR Pacific Coast Late Model Division between 1956 and 1966.

== Racing career ==
McCoy began racing cars and motorcycles in 1949. He primarily raced in the Pacific Northwest and California but also competed in the Circuit of Champions convertible division for a season in the 1950s, traveling all over the East. He first competed in NASCAR in 1956, where he finished twentieth in a NASCAR Grand National Series and NASCAR Pacific Coast Late Model Division combination race at the Arizona State Fairgrounds.

McCoy ran seven Pacific Coast Late Model races in 1957, five of which were combination races with the Grand National Series; he scored a best finish of fifth at Portland Speedway. He also made his USAC Stock Car Series debut at Riverside International Raceway, where he finished fourteenth.

McCoy's only NASCAR starts of 1958 were two combination races, where he finished sixth at Riverside International Raceway and 25th at the California State Fairgrounds Race Track. He also ran the first two races of the USAC Stock Car season, finishing fifteenth at the Arizona State Fairgrounds and 23rd in his final series start at the Los Angeles Fairgrounds. McCoy ran two IMCA Stock Car Series races, finishing third at Wausau Fairgrounds and fourteenth at Sedalia Speedway.

In two known Pacific Coast Late Model starts in 1959, McCoy finished seventeenth at the California State Fairgrounds and sixteenth at Kearney Bowl. The race at the California State Fairgrounds was a combination race with the Grand National Series.

McCoy did not return to NASCAR until 1963, when he ran at least three Pacific Coast Late Model races, finishing fourth and sixth in the standalone races at Ascot Park and Riverside respectively. In the 1963 Golden State 400 at Riverside, a combination race and his final Grand National start, McCoy finished 38th due to differential issues on the second lap.

In 1964, McCoy ran at least eighteen Pacific Coast Late Model races, scoring twelve top-tens, including three wins coming Salem Speedway, Jantzen Beach Arena, and Portland Speedway. These would be his only wins in the series and he finished a career-best fifth in the standings.

After not competing in the series in 1965, McCoy returned for his final Pacific Coast Late Model attempts at Portland in 1966, failing to qualify for the sixth race of the season and finishing fifteenth in his final start. He won the Oregon Auto Racing Association modified stock car championship.

McCoy set a new track record at a race in Elma, Washington at age 70.

== Personal life ==
McCoy was born in Tacoma, Washington in 1928. He married Pat Schammerhorn in 1948, and the couple was married for 21 years before divorcing; McCoy later married Jan Mitchell, who he remained married to until his death. He worked several years driving trucks for Ober Logging, owned by Mike Ober, McCoy's car owner in NASCAR for multiple seasons. He later owned and operated Jack D. McCoy Trucking.

== Death ==
Following a brief illness, McCoy died on June 24, 2020 in Milwaukie, Oregon at the age of 92.
