= 1963 Golden State 400 =

Auto race held at Riverside International Raceway in 1963

Race details
- Race 55 of 55 in the 1963 NASCAR Grand National Series season
- Layout of Riverside International Raceway
- Date: November 3, 1963
- Official name: Golden State 400
- Location: Riverside International Raceway, Riverside, California
- Course: Permanent racing facility
- Course length: 2.620 miles (4.216 km)
- Distance: 153 laps, 400.9 mi (645.1 km)
- Weather: Temperatures of 66.9 °F (19.4 °C); wind speeds of 9.9 miles per hour (15.9 km/h)
- Average speed: 91.645 mph (147.488 km/h)
- Attendance: 20,000

Pole position
Driver	Dan Gurney	Wood Brothers Racing
- Time: 96.190 seconds

Most laps led
Driver	Dave MacDonald	Wood Brothers Racing
- Laps: 92

Winner
No. 16	Darel Dieringer	Bill Stroppe

Television in the United States
- Network: untelevised
- Announcers: none

The 1963 Golden State 400 was a NASCAR Grand National Series event that was held on November 3, 1963, at Riverside International Raceway in Riverside, California.

== Background ==
Riverside International Raceway a race track or road course in Moreno Valley, California. The track was in operation from September 22, 1957, to July 2, 1989. The original course design proved to be dangerous, and it was partially reconfigured in 1969.

The track was built to accommodate several different configurations, depending on the type of car and race length. The three options on Riverside Raceway were the long course (3.27 miles (5.26 km)), the short course (2.5 miles (4.0 km)), and the NASCAR (2.62 miles (4.22 km)) course. The original racetrack had a 1.1-mile (1.8 km) backstretch from 1957 to 1968. When the track was redesigned in 1969, Turn 9 was reconfigured with a wider radius and a dogleg approach added to reduce strain on the cars' brakes.

== Race report ==
This event took four hours and twenty-one seconds; Darel Dieringer defeated Dave MacDonald by one lap. MacDonald led most of this race until he lost 3rd gear.

More than 32000 people would watch the 148-lap race on a road course spanning 2.700 miles (4.345 km) and speeds averaging 91.465 miles per hour (147.199 km/h). Dan Gurney won the pole position at a speed of 101.050 miles per hour (162.624 km/h) but Marvin Panch substituted for him on the day of the race. Only one caution was waved for the entire race. Forty-one American-born racers would qualify and Bruce Worrell would finish in last place due to an engine problem on the first lap of the race. This would end up becoming the only 1963 race of 300 miles or more where a Holman-Moody Ford failed to secure a place in the top two.

Fred Lorenzen only ran just over half the races, focusing on the super speedways, and finished third in points by a good margin over Ned Jarrett, who ran nearly all of them. Lorenzen had a good run going early as he led 20 laps at the start before the transmission failed in his #28 Ford.

Ken Miles, a legendary sports car racer with the Ford GT40 program, made his only NASCAR start and finished just outside the top-10 despite obtaining a considerable amount of damage during the race. Miles was a test driver for Carroll Shelby and he wasn't the only Shelby-connected competitor in this race as Pete Brock, the designer of the iconic Shelby Daytona Coupe, made his only NASCAR Cup start and brought home the #211 Kraco Safety Belts Mercury with a top-20 despite being sidelined by fuel problems. The race purse would add up to $33,780 ($355,241 when adjusted for inflation); with the winner receiving $7,875 ($82,816 when adjusted for inflation) and the last place finisher receiving $200 ($2,103 when adjusted for inflation).

Joe Weatherly would go on to win the 1963 title over Richard Petty, who overshadowed Weatherly in nearly every statistical category that year. The points were paid per the "importance" of each race. Superspeedway races were paid a certain higher amount. 250 mile major short track races were paid a little lower and short track races of less than 250 miles were paid the lowest amount.

Notable crew chiefs in the race were Herb Nab, Bradley Denis, Mario Rossi, and Louis Clements. Richard Petty attempted to drive this race using an automatic transmission but his transmission failed only five laps into the race. He would go on to become a replacement driver for Junior Johnson; although Johnson got credit for the fifth-place finish.

=== Qualifying ===
Grid	No.	Driver	Manufacturer	Qualifying time	Speed	Owner
1	121	Dan Gurney	'63 Ford	1:36.190	101.050	Wood Brothers
2	22	Fireball Roberts	'63 Ford	1:37.810	99.376	Holman-Moody
3	16	Darel Dieringer	'63 Mercury	1:38.110	99.072	Bill Stroppe
4	28	Fred Lorenzen	'63 Ford	1:38.160	99.022	Holman-Moody
5	4	Rex White	'63 Mercury	1:38.210	98.971	Rex White
6	21	Dave MacDonald	'63 Ford	1:38.400	98.780	Wood Brothers
7	11	Ned Jarrett	'63 Ford	1:38.420	98.760	Charles Robinson
8	33	Clem Proctor	'63 Pontiac	1:38.850	98.330	Clem Proctor
9	8	Joe Weatherly	'63 Mercury	1:39.980	97.219	Bud Moore
10	281	Ken Miles	'63 Ford	1:40.310	96.899	Holman-Moody

Failed to qualify: Danny Weinberg (#3), A. J. Foyt, Parnelli Jones, Rodger Ward, Roger Penske
Driver change: Dan Gurney (#121) replaced by Marvin Panch

== Top 10 finishers ==
Pos	Grid	No.	Driver	Manufacturer	Laps	Winnings	Laps led	Time/Status
1	3	16	Darel Dieringer	Mercury	148	$7,845	35	4:21:37
2	6	21	Dave MacDonald	Ford	147	$4,655	92	+1 lap
3	1	121	Marvin Panch	Ford	147	$2,860	1	+1 lap
4	2	22	Fireball Roberts	Ford	147	$1,775	0	+1 lap
5	19	26	Junior Johnson	Mercury	145	$1,300	0	+3 laps
6	15	47	Jack Smith	Plymouth	144	$1,175	0	+4 laps
7	9	8	Joe Weatherly	Mercury	143	$1,475	0	+5 laps
8	22	62	Bill Amick	Mercury	142	$1,000	0	+6 laps
9	40	18	Bob Ross	Mercury	140	$950	0	+8 laps
10	33	97	Ron Hornaday	Ford	140	$850	0	+8 laps

== Timeline ==
Section reference:

- Start of race: Fred Lorenzen leaves the start/finish line as the lead driver.
- Lap 1: Rex White had a terminal crash, forcing him to retire from the race.
- Lap 22: Dave MacDonald takes over the lead from Fred Lorenzen.
- Lap 42: Paul Goldsmith had a terminal crash, forcing him out of the race.
- Lap 44: Bob Bondurant had a terminal crash, forcing him out of the race.
- Lap 67: Scotty Cain fell out with engine failure.
- Lap 74: Chuck Shove fell out with engine failure.
- Lap 77: Darel Dieringer takes over the lead from Dave MacDonald.
- Lap 80: Dave MacDonald takes over the lead from Darel Dieringer.
- Lap 116: Darel Dieringer takes over the lead from Dave MacDonald.
- Lap 117: Jimmy Pardue's vehicle had a major case of transmission issues.
- Lap 118: Dave MacDonald takes over the lead from Darel Dieringer.
- Lap 119: Darel Dieringer takes over the lead from Dave MacDonald.
- Lap 133: Jim Cook had a terminal crash, forcing himself to exit the race prematurely.
- Lap 134: Pete Brock managed to run out of fuel while racing.
- Finish: Darel Dieringer was officially declared the winner of the event.

Preceded by 1963 untitled race at Orange Speedway	NASCAR Grand National Races; 1963-64	Succeeded by 1964 Textile 250
