= Walter McCoy =

Walter McCoy may refer to:

- Walter I. McCoy (1859–1933), American Democratic Party politician from New Jersey
- Walter R. McCoy (1880–1952), advocate of the hobby of stamp collecting
- Walter McCoy (sprinter) (born 1958), American former sprinter
- Walter McCoy (baseball) (1923–2015), Negro leagues and Minor League Baseball pitcher
