= Robert McCoy =

Robert McCoy may refer to:

- Robert McCoy (politician) (died 1849), congressman from Pennsylvania
- Robert Bruce McCoy (1867–1926), American general
- Robert Nighthawk (1909–1967), also known as Robert Lee McCoy, American musician
- Bob McCoy (Robert McCoy, 1934–2016), American basketball player and coach
- Robert McCoy, accused in McCoy v. Louisiana
- Rob McCoy, American baseball coach
- Robert Anthony McCoy (born 1987), American football tight end
- Robert Wilson McCoy (1902–1961), American illustrator and painter
