= Senator McCoy =

Senator McCoy may refer to:

- Beau McCoy (born 1980), Nebraska State Senate
- John McCoy (American politician) (1943–2023), Washington State Senate
- Matt McCoy (politician) (born 1966), Iowa State Senate
- Scott McCoy (born 1970), Utah State Senate
- Vernon McCoy (1908–1988), West Virginia State Senate
- William McCoy (Oregon politician) (1921–1996), Oregon State Senate
