= Elijah McCoy =

Canadian inventor and engineer (1844–1929)

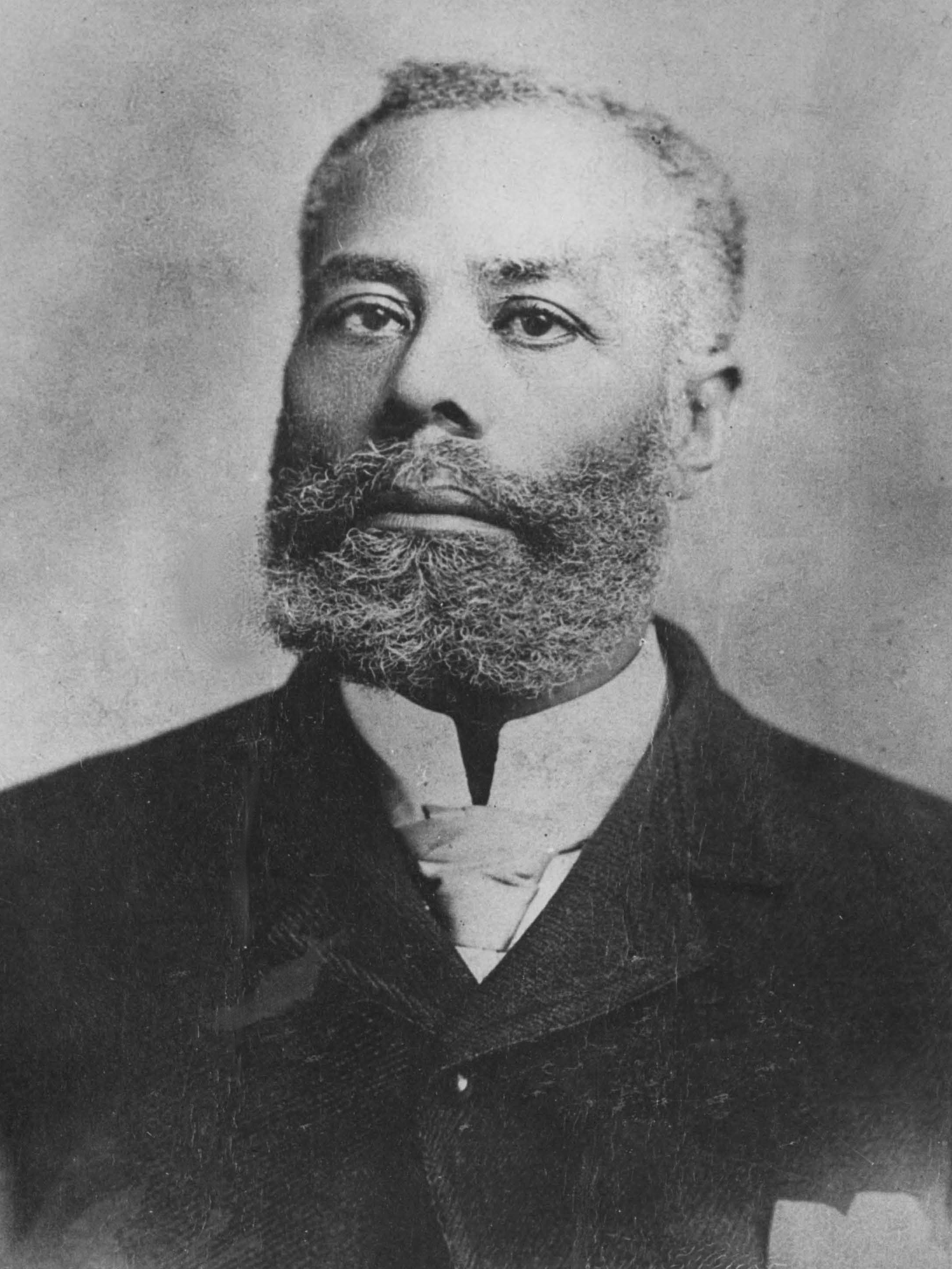
- McCoy c. 1895
- Born: May 2, 1844; Colchester, Ontario, Canada West, Province of Canada
- Died: October 10, 1929 (aged 85); Detroit, Michigan, US
- Resting place: Detroit Memorial Park East in Warren, Michigan, U.S.
- Education: University of Edinburgh
- Occupations: Engineer, inventor, tribologist, railroad fireman and oiler
- Known for: Invention of a steam engine automatic lubricator
- Spouses: Ann Elizabeth Stewart; Mary Eleanora Delaney (m. 1873; died 1923)

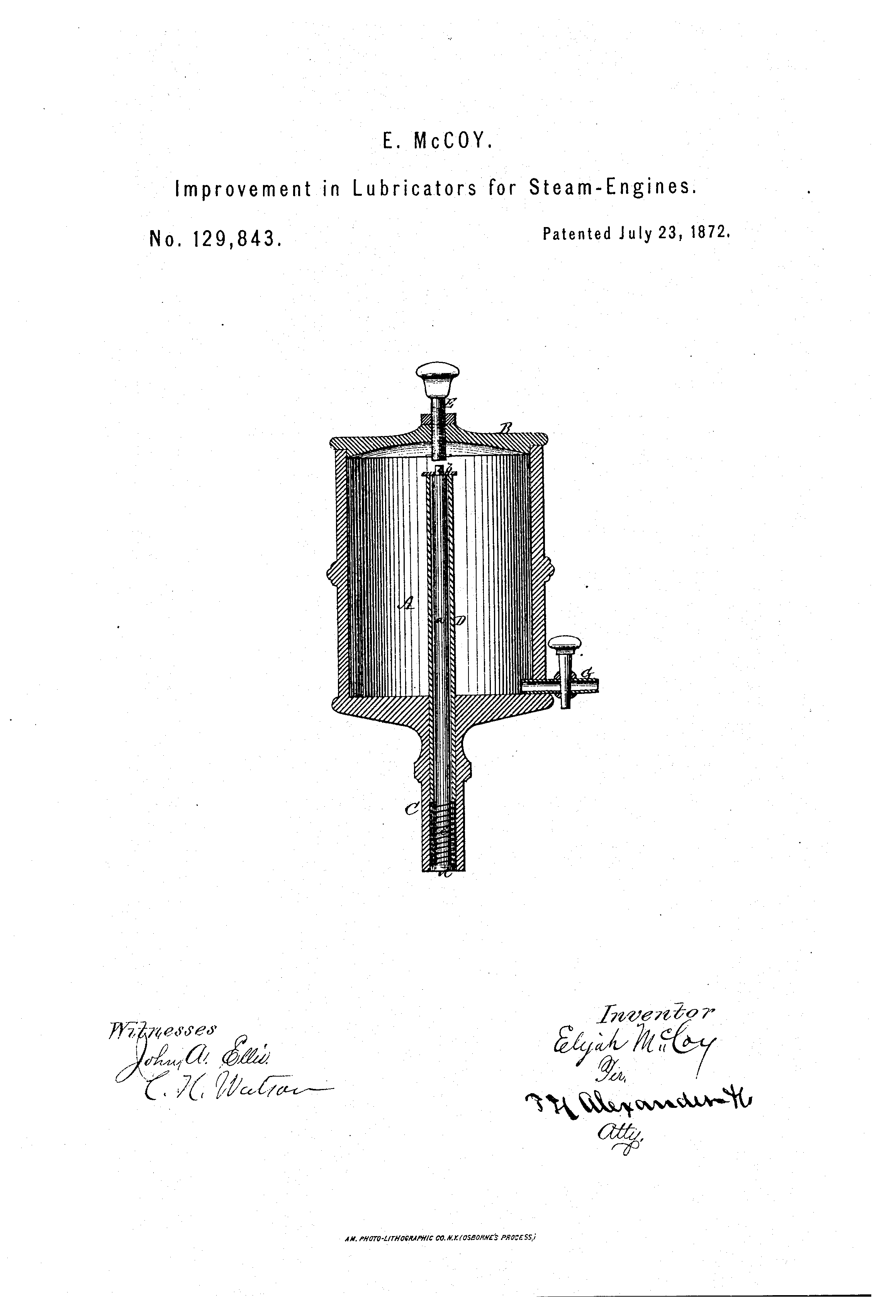
First page of US patent 129,843 for Improvement in Lubricators for Steam-Engines

Elijah J. McCoy (May 2, 1844 (Note: Sources give his birthdate as May 2, 1843; May 2, 1844; or less commonly March 27, 1843.) – October 10, 1929) was a Canadian-American engineer of African-American descent who invented lubrication systems for steam engines. Born free on the Ontario shore of Lake Erie to parents who fled enslavement in Kentucky, he traveled to the United States as a young child when his family returned in 1847, becoming a U.S. resident and citizen. His inventions and accomplishments were honored in 2012 when the United States Patent and Trademark Office named its first regional office, in Detroit, Michigan, the "Elijah J. McCoy Midwest Regional Patent Office".

== Early life ==
Elijah McCoy was born in 1844 in Colchester, Ontario, to George and Mildred Goins McCoy. At the time, they were fugitive slaves who had escaped from Kentucky to Ontario via helpers through the Underground Railroad. George and Mildred arrived in Colchester Township, Essex County, in what was then called Upper Canada in 1837 via Detroit. Elijah McCoy had eleven siblings. Ten of the children were born in Ontario from Alfred (1836) to William (1859).

Upper Canadian schools were segregated under the Common Schools Act as amended in 1850, and McCoy was educated in black schools of Colchester Township. At the age of 15, in 1859, Elijah McCoy was sent to Scotland. While there he was apprenticed and, after studying at the University of Edinburgh, certified as a mechanical engineer. Based on 1860 Tax Assessment Rolls, land deeds of sale, and the 1870 US Census it can be determined George McCoy's family moved to Ypsilanti, Michigan in the United States in 1859–60; by the time Elijah returned, his family had established themselves on the farm of John and Maryann Starkweather in Ypsilanti. George used his skills as a tobacconist in order to establish a tobacco and cigar business.

== Career ==
When Elijah McCoy arrived in Michigan, he could find work only as a fireman and oiler at the Michigan Central Railroad. In a home-based machine shop in Ypsilanti, McCoy also did more highly skilled work, such as developing improvements and inventions. He invented an automatic lubricator for oiling the steam engines of locomotives and ships, patenting it in 1872 as "Improvement in Lubricators for Steam-Engines" (U.S. patent 129,843).

Similar automatic oilers had been patented previously; one is the displacement lubricator, which had already attained widespread use and whose technological descendants continued to be widely used into the 20th century. Lubricators were a boon for railroads, as they enabled trains to run faster and more profitably with less need to stop for lubrication and maintenance. By 1899, the Michigan Bureau of Labor and Industrial Statistics reported that the McCoy lubricator was in use on almost all North American railroads.

McCoy continued to refine his devices and design new ones, and was noted in periodicals of the time, including the Railroad Gazette. Most of his patents dealt with lubricating systems, including a further patent in 1898 which added a glass 'sight-feed' tube to monitor the rate of lubricant delivery (U.S. patent 614,307).

After the turn of the century, he attracted notice among his Black contemporaries. Booker T. Washington, in Story of the Negro (1909), recognized him as having produced more patents than any other Black inventor up to that time. This creativity gave McCoy an honored status in the Black community that has persisted to this day. He continued to invent until late in life, obtaining as many as 57 patents; most related to lubrication, but others also included a folding ironing board and a lawn sprinkler. Lacking the capital with which to manufacture his lubricators in large numbers, he usually assigned his patent rights to his employers or sold them to investors. In 1920, near the end of his career, he formed the Elijah McCoy Manufacturing Company.

== Regarding the phrase "The real McCoy" ==
This popular expression, typically meaning the real thing, has, in a false etymology been incorrectly attributed to Elijah McCoy's oil-drip cup invention. The false etymology claims that railroad engineers looking to avoid inferior copies would request it by name, and inquire if a locomotive was fitted with "the real McCoy system". This theory is mentioned in Elijah McCoy's biography at the National Inventors Hall of Fame. The December 1966 issue of Ebony, in an advertisement for Old Taylor Bourbon made the first mention of Elijah McCoy in this context: "But the most famous legacy McCoy left his country was his name."

The phrase 'the real McCoy' actually originates from Scotland and its origin has nothing to do with Elijah McCoy. It has undoubtedly been applied as an epithet to many other McCoys.

== Marriage and death ==
McCoy married for the second time in 1873 to Mary Eleanora Delaney. The couple moved to Detroit when McCoy found work there. Mary McCoy (died 1923) helped found the Phillis Wheatley Home for Aged Colored Men in 1898. Elijah McCoy died in the Eloise Infirmary in Nankin Township, now Westland, Michigan, on 10 October 1929, at the age of 85, as a result of injuries suffered in a car accident seven years earlier in which his wife Mary died. He is buried in Detroit Memorial Park East in Warren, Michigan.

== In popular culture ==
- 1966, an ad for Old Taylor bourbon cited Elijah McCoy with a photo and the expression "the real McCoy", ending with the tag line: "But the most famous legacy McCoy left his country was his name."
- 2006, Canadian playwright Andrew Moodie's The Real McCoy portrayed McCoy's life, the challenges he faced as an African American, and the development of his inventions. It was first produced in Toronto and has also been produced in the United States, for example in Saint Louis, Missouri, in 2011, where it was performed by the Black Rep Theatre.
- In her 2001 novel Noughts & Crosses, Malorie Blackman describes a racial dystopia in which the roles of black and white people are reversed; Elijah McCoy is among the black scientists, inventors, and pioneers mentioned in a history class that Blackman "never learned about in school".
- A 1945 song by Richard Rodgers and Oscar Hammerstein II, "Isn't it Kinda Fun", from the musical State Fair, includes the lyrical phrase "...this is the real McCoy."

== Legacy ==
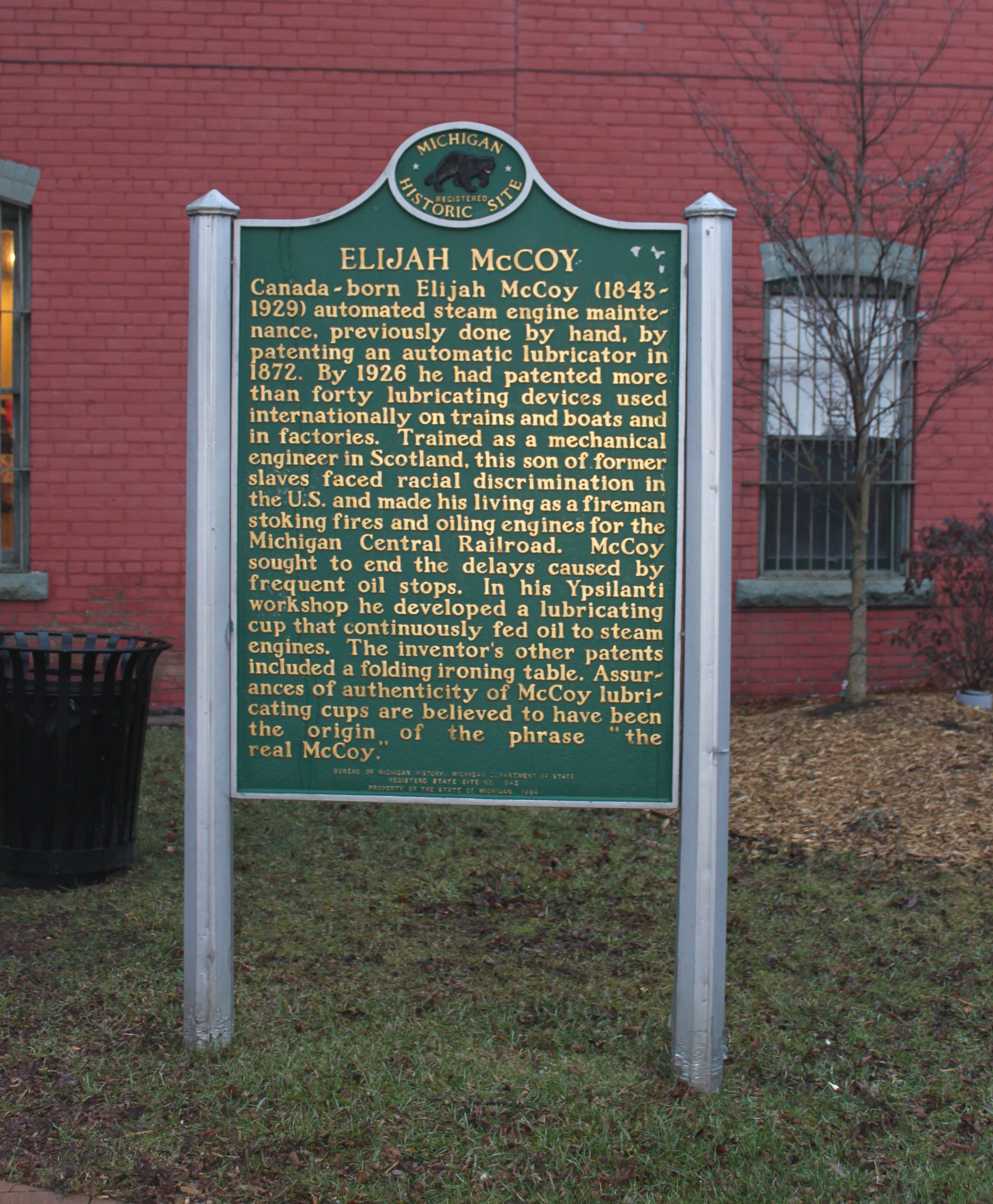
McCoy historical marker, Ypsilanti

- In 1974, the state of Michigan put a historical marker (P25170) at the McCoys' former home at 5720 Lincoln Avenue, and at his gravesite.
- In 1975, Detroit celebrated Elijah McCoy Day by placing a historic marker at the site of his home. The city also named a nearby street for him.
- In 1994, Michigan installed a historical marker (S0642) at his first workshop in Ypsilanti, Michigan.
- In 2001, McCoy was inducted into the National Inventors Hall of Fame in Alexandria, Virginia.
- In 2012, The Elijah J. McCoy Midwest Regional U.S. Patent and Trademark Office (the first USPTO satellite office) was opened in Detroit, Michigan. (Note: "And the people of Detroit have time and again been they very sort of pioneers who shape our country with innovative audacity. Near the end of the 19th century, an inventor named Elijah McCoy came to this city, drawn by its potential, and history was made-with more than 57 U.S. patents by the end of his remarkable life, Elijah's vision transformed the railroad system, and with it our trade economy. That's the story of American possibility, realized through the power of the American patent-and I can think of no more fitting name to adorn the walls of this new office than the "Real McCoy" himself.")
- In 2022, a Google Doodle appeared in Canada and the U.S. marking his 178th birthday on May 2.
