= Michael McCoy (disambiguation) =

Michael McCoy is an American industrial designer and educator .

Michael or Mike McCoy may also refer to:

== Sports ==
=== American football ===
- Mike McCoy (American football coach) (born 1972), American football coach
- Mike McCoy (cornerback) (1953–2016), American football defensive back
- Mike McCoy (defensive tackle) (born 1948), former American football defensive lineman

=== Other sports ===
- Mike McCoy (baseball) (born 1981), American baseball player
- Mike McCoy (golfer) (born 1962), American golfer

== Others ==
- Mike McCoy (businessman), oil and gas businessman
- Mike McCoy (filmmaker) (born 1969), American film director
- Mike McCoy, stunt rider and competitor in the Baja 1000
- Mike McCoy, member of The Brothers Four
- Michael N.W. McCoy, United States Air Force colonel, after whom McCoy Air Force Base was named
