= Ron Hornaday Sr. =

American racing driver (1931–2008)

- Born: Ronald Lee Hornaday; January 13, 1931; San Fernando, California, U.S.
- Died: December 21, 2008 (age 77)
- Achievements: NASCAR Pacific Coast Late Model Division champion (1963, 1964)
- Awards: West Coast Stock Car Hall of Fame (2002 - Inaugural Class)

NASCAR Cup Series career
- 17 races run over 10 years
- Best finish: 45th (1955)
- First race: 1955 Race 13 (Phoenix)
- Last race: 1973 Tuborg 400 (Riverside)
Wins	Top tens	Poles
0	4	0

ARCA Menards Series West career
- 78 races run over 14 years
- Best finish: 1st (1963, 1964)
- First race: 1955 Race 1 (Phoenix)
- Last race: 1971 Miller High Life 500 (Ontario)
- First win: 1961 Race 7 (Gardena)
- Last win: 1968 Saugus 100 (Saugus)
Wins	Top tens	Poles
13	49	13
- Statistics up to date as of June 2, 2026.

Ronald Lee Hornaday Sr. (January 13, 1931 – December 21, 2008) was an American racer from San Fernando, California. He was the father of NASCAR Camping World Truck Series champion Ron Hornaday Jr. and the grandfather of Ronnie Hornaday. Hornaday was inducted in the West Coast Stock Car Hall of Fame in its first class in 2002. He made 17 NASCAR Cup Series starts between 1955 and 1973; mainly on the West Coast.

== Racing career ==
Hornaday began racing at Saugus Speedway and later Ascot Park, driving the No. 97 Galpin Motors Ford. His weekly occupation was working as the parts and service manager for Galpin Motors, and he received sponsorship from his employer throughout his career. Hornaday made his first NASCAR Grand National start in 1955 at the Arizona State Fairgrounds. He finished 14th in a 29 car field to earn $25. He started racing in the NASCAR Pacific Coast Late Model Division (now the ARCA Menards Series West) in 1956. He began winning races a few years later, and he finished second in the 1962 season championship behind Eddie Gray.

Hornaday won the season points championship in 1963, and he repeated as champion in 1964. In his Pacific Coast Late Model career he had 13 victories.

== Death ==
Hornaday died in California from cancer on December 21, 2008. His son Ron commented on his website, "Our father was the inspiration to all of us and was a true champion to the very end. We will miss him so very much but it is a comfort to know that he is now with his beloved wife and our mother, Helen, where he wanted to be."

Achievements
Preceded by Eddie Gray	NASCAR Pacific Coast Late Model Division champion 1963–1964	Succeeded by Bill Amick
