= John E. McCoy =

United States Air Force general

John E. McCoy is a major general in the United States National Guard and is the Air National Guard Assistant to the Commander of Air Education and Training Command.

== Biography ==
McCoy graduated from Joseph A. Craig High School in Janesville, Wisconsin, before obtaining a B.S. from the University of Wisconsin-Madison and a M.S. from Cardinal Stritch University. He resides in Stoughton, Wisconsin.

== Career ==
McCoy originally enlisted in the Wisconsin Army National Guard in 1979 before transferring to the Wisconsin Air National Guard in 1984 and was later commissioned a second lieutenant. He is a graduate of the Air War College and National Defense University and is a member of the National Guard Association of the United States and the Military Officers Association of America.

Awards he has received include the Meritorious Service Medal with oak leaf cluster, the Air Force Commendation Medal with two oak leaf clusters, the Army Commendation Medal, the Air Force Achievement Medal, the Air Force Outstanding Unit Award with three oak leaf clusters, the Air Force Organizational Excellence Award, the National Defense Service Medal with two service stars, the Global War on Terrorism Service Medal, the Armed Forces Service Medal with service star, the Air Force Longevity Service Award with one silver oak leaf cluster and one bronze oak leaf cluster, the Armed Forces Reserve Medal with gold hourglass device, the Small Arms Expert Marksmanship Ribbon with service star, the Air Force Training Ribbon, and the Army Service Ribbon.
