= List of Miami Marlins first-round draft picks =

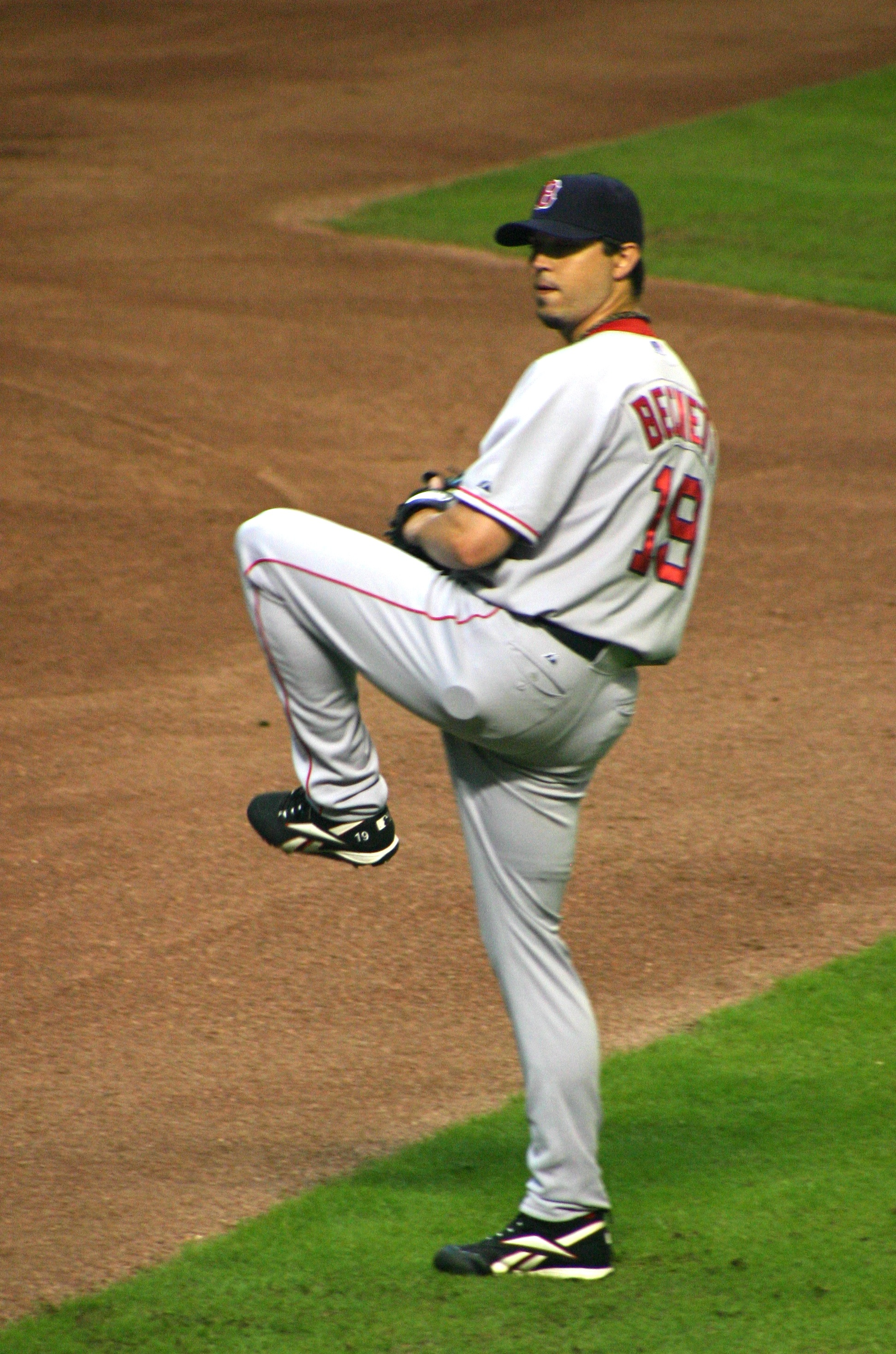
Josh Beckett (1999) won a World Series ring with the Marlins in 2003 and then with the Boston Red Sox in 2007.

The Miami Marlins are a Major League Baseball (MLB) franchise based in Miami, Florida. They play in the National League East division. Since the franchise was established in 1993 as the Florida Marlins, the Marlins have selected 35 players in the first round. Officially known as the "First-Year Player Draft", the Rule 4 Draft is MLB's primary mechanism for assigning players from high schools, colleges, and other amateur clubs to its franchises. The draft order is determined based on the previous season's standings, with the team possessing the worst record receiving the first pick. In addition, teams which lost free agents in the previous off-season may be awarded compensatory or supplementary picks. The First-Year Player Draft is unrelated to the 1992 expansion draft in which the Marlins filled their roster.

Of the 35 players picked in the first round by the Marlins, 20 have been pitchers, the most of any position; 11 of these were right-handed, while nine were left-handed. Six outfielders were selected and three players each were taken at first base, third base, and catcher. The Marlins have also drafted one shortstop in the first round, though they have never taken a second baseman. Seven of the players came from high schools or universities in the state of California; Florida and Texas schools each produced four players; and Louisiana schools produced three.

Two of the Marlins' first-round picks have won championships with the franchise. Charles Johnson (1992) won a World Series title on the 1997 championship team and Josh Beckett (1999) won with the 2003 team. Beckett also went on to be a part of the Boston Red Sox 2007 World Series championship team. Chris Coghlan (2006) is the only first-round pick of the Marlins to win the Rookie of the Year Award, taking the honor in 2009. None of their first-round picks have been elected to the Baseball Hall of Fame or won the Most Valuable Player or Cy Young Award. The Marlins have made three selections in the supplemental round of the draft and have made the first overall selection once (2000). They have also had five compensatory picks since their first draft in 1992. These additional picks are provided when a team loses a particularly valuable free agent in the previous off-season,^{[V]} or, more recently, if a team fails to sign a draft pick from the previous year. The Marlins have never failed to sign a first-round pick.

== Key ==
Year	Each year links to an article about that year's Major League Baseball draft.
Position	Indicates the secondary/collegiate position at which the player was drafted, rather than the professional position the player may have gone on to play
Pick	Indicates the number of the pick
§	Indicates a supplemental pick
'97	Player was a member of the Marlins' 1997 championship team
'03	Player was a member of the Marlins' 2003 championship team

== Picks ==
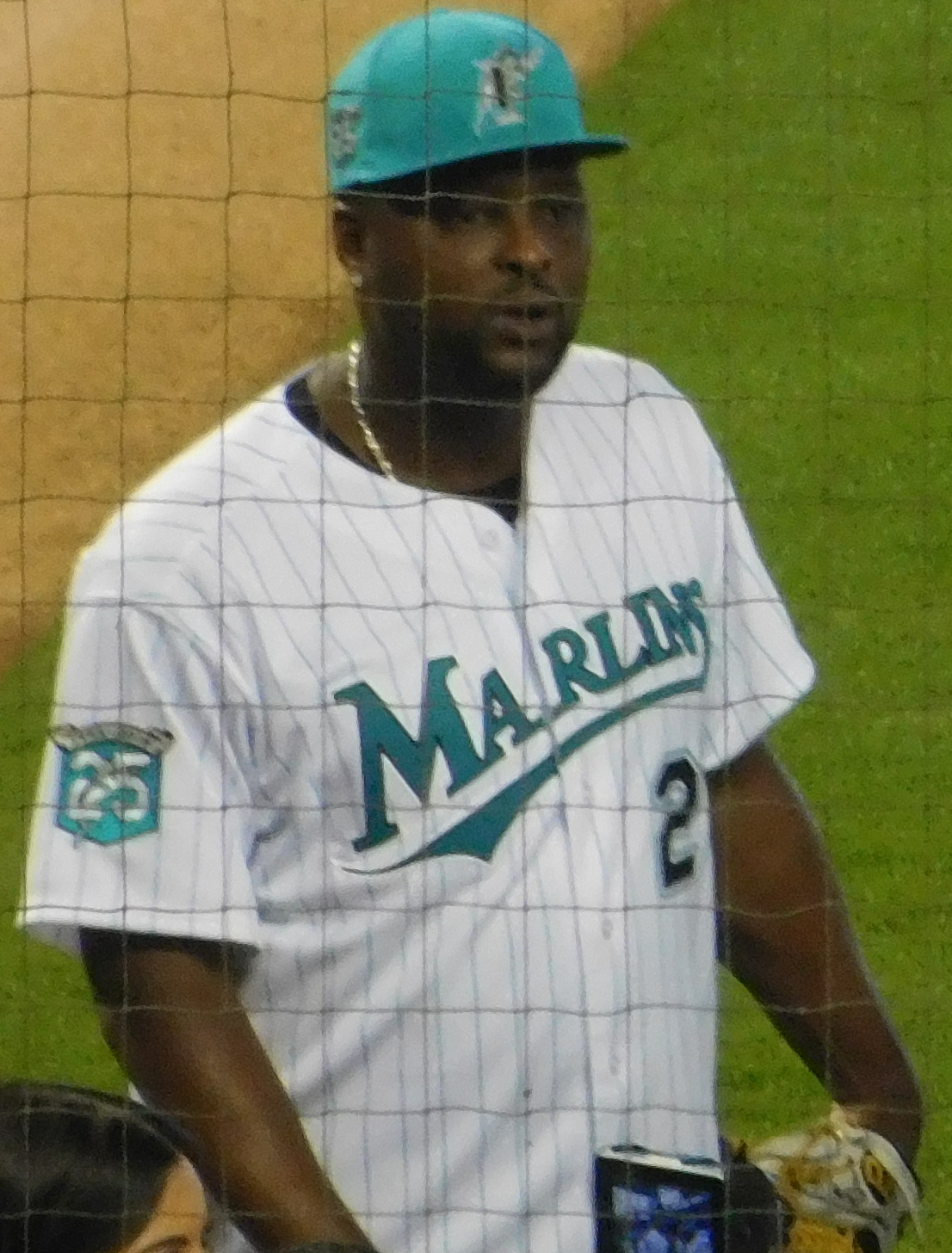
Charles Johnson (1992) was the first draft pick in franchise history.

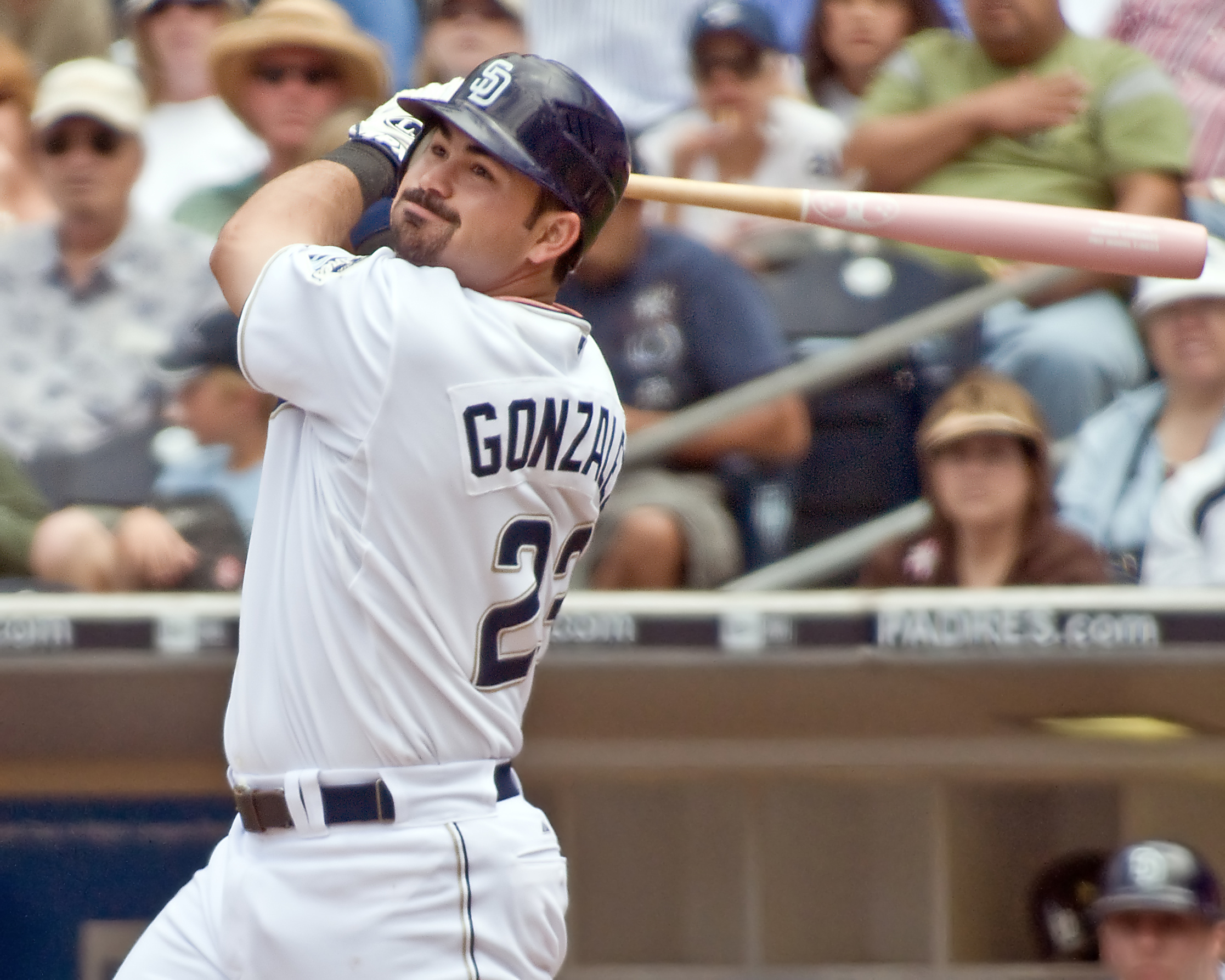
Adrián González (2000) was the franchise's only first-overall pick of the draft.

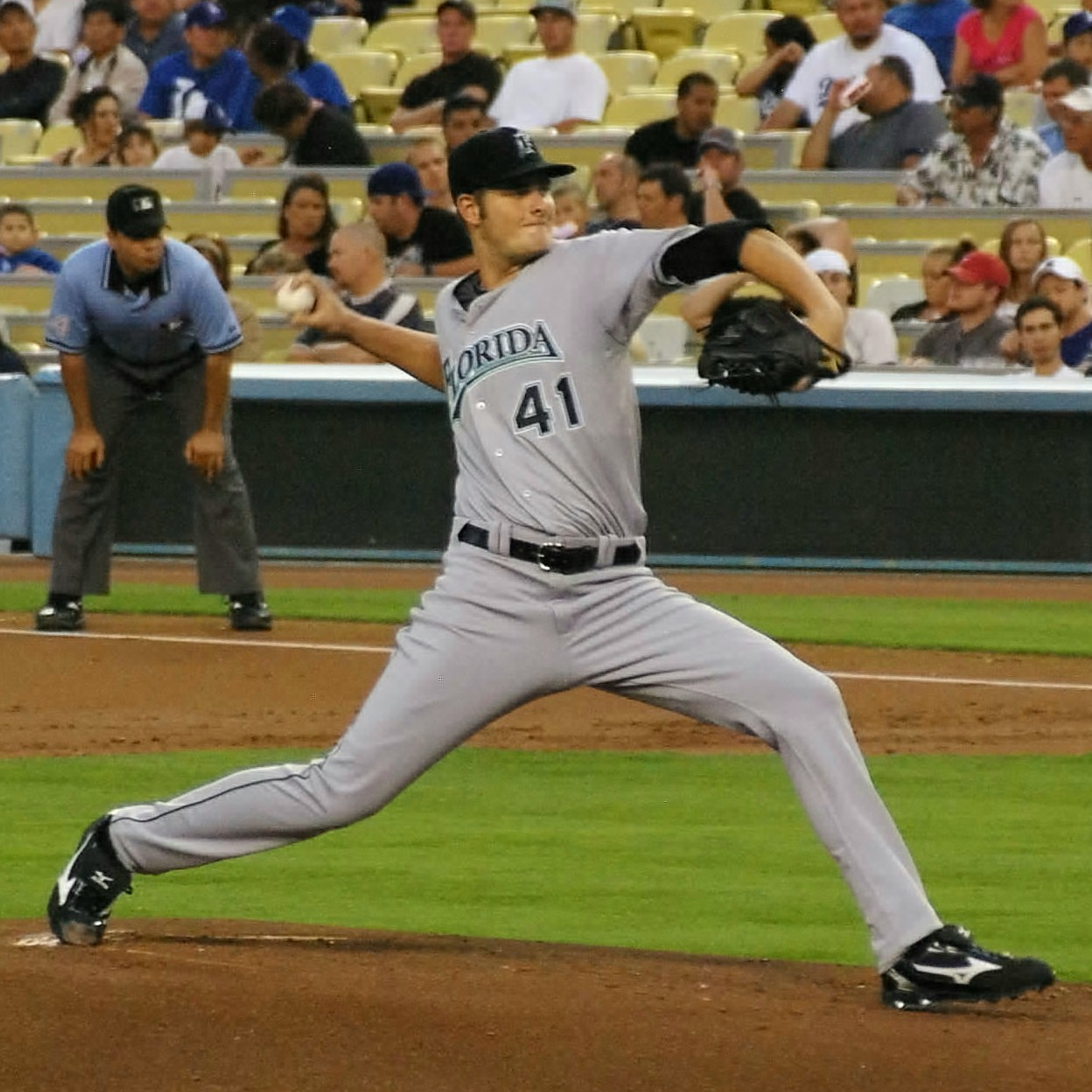
Chris Volstad (2005) was one of eight pitchers taken by the Marlins in the first round from 2003 to 2006.

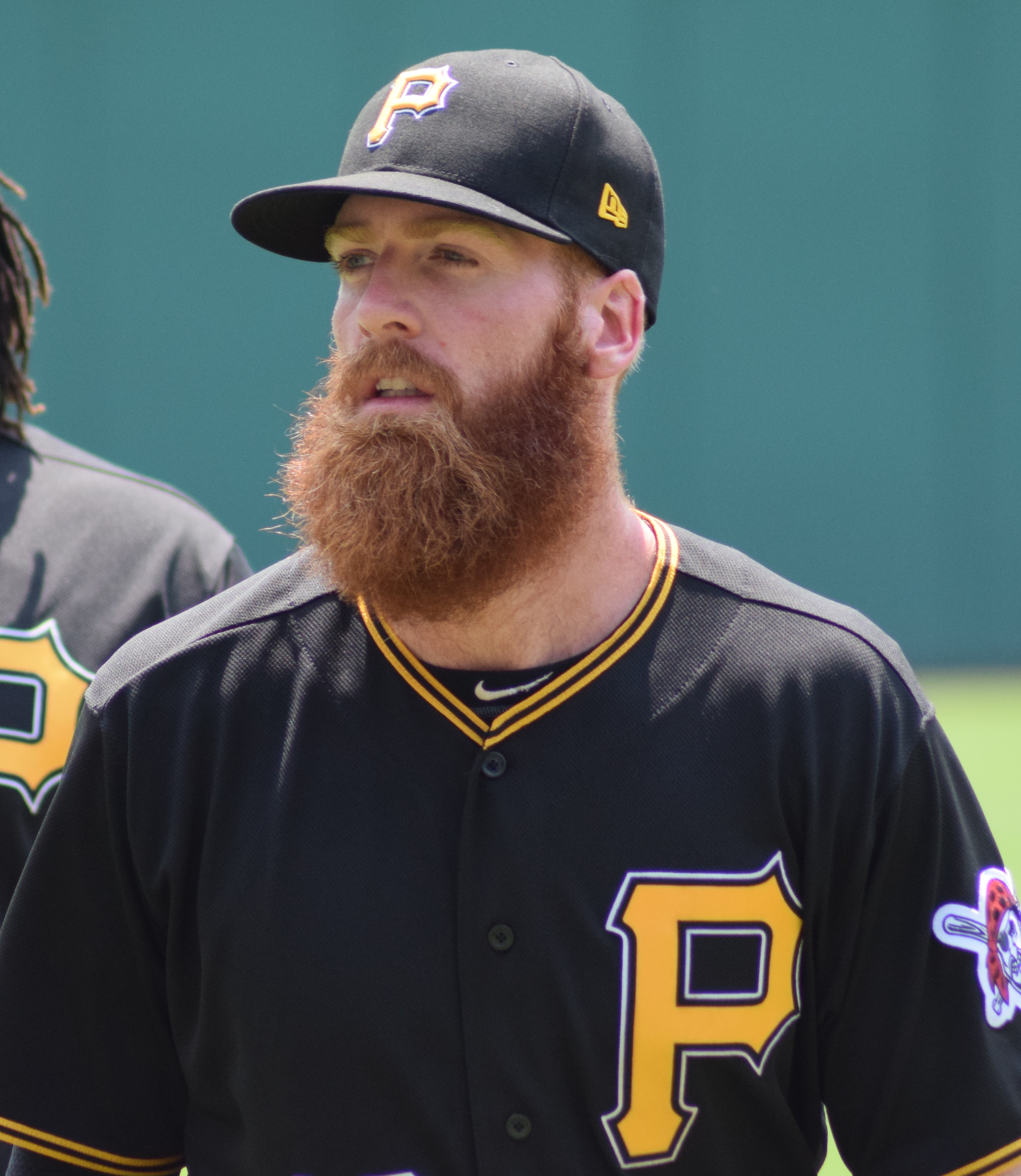
Colin Moran was the first of two North Carolina Tar Heels teammates selected by the Marlins in the first round in 2013.

Year	Name	Position	School (location)	Pick	Ref
1992	Charles Johnson^{'97}	Catcher	University of Miami (Coral Gables, Florida)	28	
1993	Marc Valdes	Right-handed pitcher	University of Florida (Gainesville, Florida)	27	
1994	Josh Booty	Shortstop	Evangel Christian High School (Shreveport, Louisiana)	5	
1995	Jaime Jones	Outfielder	Rancho Bernardo High School (San Diego, California)	6	
1996	Mark Kotsay	Outfielder	California State University, Fullerton (Fullerton, California)	9	
1997	Aaron Akin	Right-handed pitcher	Cowley County CC (Arkansas City, Kansas)	12	
1998	Chip Ambres	Outfielder	West Brook High School (Beaumont, Texas)	27	
1999	Josh Beckett^{'03}	Right-handed pitcher	Spring High School (Spring, Texas)	2	
2000	Adrián González	First baseman	Eastlake High School (Chula Vista, California)	1	
2001	no first-round pick^{[a]}				
2002	Jeremy Hermida	Outfielder	Wheeler High School (Marietta, Georgia)	11	
2003	Jeffrey Allison	Right-handed pitcher	Peabody Veterans Memorial High School (Peabody, Massachusetts)	16	
2004	Taylor Tankersley	Left-handed pitcher	University of Alabama (Tuscaloosa, Alabama)	27	
2005	Chris Volstad	Right-handed pitcher	Palm Beach Gardens High School (Palm Beach, Florida)	16	
2005	Aaron Thompson	Left-handed pitcher	Second Baptist School (Houston, Texas)	22^{[b]}	
2005	Jacob Marceaux	Right-handed pitcher	McNeese State University (Lake Charles, Louisiana)	29^{[c]}	
2005	Ryan Tucker	Right-handed pitcher	Temple City High School (Temple City, California)	34^{§}^{[d]}	
2005	Sean West	Left-handed pitcher	Captain Shreve High School (Shreveport, Louisiana)	44^{§}^{[e]}	
2006	Brett Sinkbeil	Right-handed pitcher	Missouri State University (Springfield, Missouri)	19	
2006	Chris Coghlan	Third baseman	University of Mississippi (Oxford, Mississippi)	36^{§}^{[f]}	
2007	Matt Dominguez	Third baseman	Chatsworth High School (Chatsworth, California)	12	
2008	Kyle Skipworth	Catcher	Patriot High School (Rubidoux, California)	6	
2009	Chad James	Left-handed pitcher	Yukon High School (Yukon, Oklahoma)	18	
2010	Christian Yelich	First baseman	Westlake High School (Westlake Village, California)	23	
2011	José Fernández	Right-handed pitcher	Braulio Alonso High School (Tampa, Florida)	14	
2012	Andrew Heaney	Left-handed pitcher	Oklahoma State University–Stillwater (Stillwater, Oklahoma)	9	
2013	Colin Moran	Third baseman	University of North Carolina at Chapel Hill (Chapel Hill, North Carolina)	6	
2013	Matt Krook	Left-handed pitcher	University of North Carolina at Chapel Hill (Chapel Hill, North Carolina)	35^{§}^{[g]}	
2014	Tyler Kolek	Right-handed pitcher	Shepherd High School (Shepherd, Texas)	2	
2014	Blake Anderson	Catcher	West Lauderdale High School (Collinsville, Mississippi)	36^{§}	
2015	Josh Naylor	First baseman	St. Joan of Arc Catholic Secondary School (Mississauga, Ontario)	12	
2016	Braxton Garrett	Left-handed pitcher	Florence High School (Florence, Alabama)	7	
2017	Trevor Rogers	Left-handed pitcher	Carlsbad High School (Carlsbad, New Mexico)	13	
2018	Connor Scott	Outfielder	Henry B. Plant High School (Tampa, Florida)	13	
2019	J. J. Bleday	Outfielder	Vanderbilt University (Nashville, Tennessee)	4	
2020	Max Meyer	Right-handed pitcher	University of Minnesota (Minneapolis, Minnesota)	3	
2021	Kahlil Watson	Shortstop	Wake Forest High School (Wake Forest, North Carolina)	16	
2021	Joe Mack	Catcher	Williamsville East High School (East Amherst, New York)	31^{§}	
2022	Jacob Berry	Outfielder	LSU (Baton Rouge, Louisiana)	6	
2023	Noble Meyer	Right-Handed pitcher	Jesuit High School (Portland, Oregon)	10	
2023	Thomas White	Left-Handed pitcher	Phillips Academy (Andover, Massachusetts)	35^{§}	
2024	PJ Morlando	Outfielder	Summerville High School (Summerville, South Carolina)	16	
2025	Aiva Arquette	Shortstop	Oregon State University (Corvallis, Oregon)	7	
2025	Cam Cannarella	Outfielder	Clemson University (Clemson, South Carolina)	43^{§}	
2026	Jacob Lombard	Shortstop	Gulliver Preparatory School (Kendall, Florida)	14	

== See also ==
- Miami Marlins minor league players

== Footnotes ==
- ^{V} Through the 2012 draft, free agents were evaluated by the Elias Sports Bureau and rated "Type A", "Type B", or not compensation-eligible. If a team offered arbitration to a player but that player refused and subsequently signed with another team, the original team was able to receive additional draft picks. If a "Type A" free agent left in this way, his previous team received a supplemental pick and a compensatory pick from the team with which he signed. If a "Type B" free agent left in this way, his previous team received only a supplemental pick. Since the 2013 draft, free agents are no longer classified by type; instead, compensatory picks are only awarded if the team offered its free agent a contract worth at least the average of the 125 current richest MLB contracts. However, if the free agent's last team acquired the player in a trade during the last year of his contract, it is ineligible to receive compensatory picks for that player.
- ^{a} The Marlins lost their first-round pick in 2001 to the Chicago White Sox as compensation for signing free agent Charles Johnson.
- ^{b} The Marlins gained a compensatory first-round pick in 2005 from the San Francisco Giants as compensation for losing free agent Armando Benítez.
- ^{c} The Marlins gained a compensatory first-round pick in 2005 from the New York Yankees as compensation for losing free agent Carl Pavano.
- ^{d} The Marlins gained a supplemental first-round pick in 2005 for losing free agent Armando Benítez.
- ^{e} The Marlins gained a supplemental first-round pick in 2005 for losing free agent Carl Pavano.
- ^{f} The Marlins gained a supplemental first-round pick in 2006 for losing free agent A. J. Burnett.
- ^{g} The Marlins received a supplemental first-round pick from the Pittsburgh Pirates, along with outfielder Gorkys Hernández, on July 31, 2012, in exchange for Gaby Sánchez and minor league pitcher Kyle Kaminska. The Pirates received the pick as a result of the 2012 Competitive Balance Lottery.
