= Ian Rafferty =

American football player and coach (born 1976)

No. 75
- Position: Offensive tackle

Personal information
- Born: September 2, 1976 (age 50); Summerville, South Carolina, U.S.
- Listed height: 6 ft 5 in (1.96 m)
- Listed weight: 300 lb (136 kg)

Career information
- High school: Summerville
- College: North Carolina State
- NFL draft: 1999: undrafted

Career history

Playing
- Tennessee Titans (1999)*; New York Jets (1999); Tennessee Titans (2000–2001); Tennessee Titans (2002)*; Amsterdam Admirals (2002)
- * Offseason or practice squad member only

Coaching
- North Charleston (SC) Fort Dorchester (OC/OL, 2004–2020); Summerville Green Wave (SC) Head Coach (2020-Present)

Awards and highlights
- Second-team All-ACC (1998)
- Stats at Pro Football Reference

Ian Rafferty (born September 2, 1976) is an American former professional football player who was an offensive lineman in the National Football League (NFL). He played college football for the NC State Wolfpack. In total, Rafferty played five times for the New York Jets.
