= List of schools in North Charleston, South Carolina =

This is a listing of schools in North Charleston, South Carolina.

== Elementary schools ==
- A.C. Corcoran Elementary School - Charleston County School District (CCSD)
- Chicora Elementary School - CCSD
- Compass Collegiate Academy - SCPCSD
- Eagle Nest Elementary School - Dorchester District 2 (DD2)
- Edmund A. Burns Elementary School - CCSD
- Fort Dorchester Elementary School - DD2
- Ladson Elementary School - CCSD
- Lambs Elementary School - CCSD
- Malcolm C. Hursey Elementary School - CCSD
- Mary Ford Elementary School - CCSD
- Matilda F. Dunston Elementary School - CCSD
- Midland Park Elementary School - CCSD
- North Charleston Elementary School - CCSD
- Oakbrook Elementary School - DD2
- Pepperhill Elementary School - CCSD
- Wendell B. Goodwin Elementary School Elementary School - CCSD
- Windsor Hill Elementary School - DD2

== Middle schools ==
- Compass Collegiate Academy - SCPCSD
- Morningside Middle School - CCSD
- Northwoods Middle School - CCSD
- Oakbrook Middle School - DD2
- River Oaks Middle School - DD2

== High schools ==
- Fort Dorchester High School - DD2
- R. B. Stall High School - CCSD
- North Charleston High School - CCSD

== Special academic programs ==
- Academic Magnet High School (9-12) - CCSD
- Garrett Academy of Technology (9-12) - CCSD
- Greg Mathis Charter High School (9-12) - CCSD
- Jerry Zucker Middle School of Science (6-8) - CCSD
- Liberty Hill Academy (K-12) - CCSD
- Military Magnet Academy (6-12) - CCSD
- Sixth Grade Academy at McNair (6) - CCSD

== Private schools ==
- Cathedral Academy (K-12)
- Charleston County School of the Arts (6-12)
- Eagle Military Academy (3-12)
- Northside Christian School (K-12) 35
- Saint John Catholic School (K-8) - Diocese of Charleston

== Post-secondary education ==
- Charleston Southern University
- Lowcountry Graduate Center
- Trident Technical College
