= Robert Quinn (American football) =

American football player (born 1990)

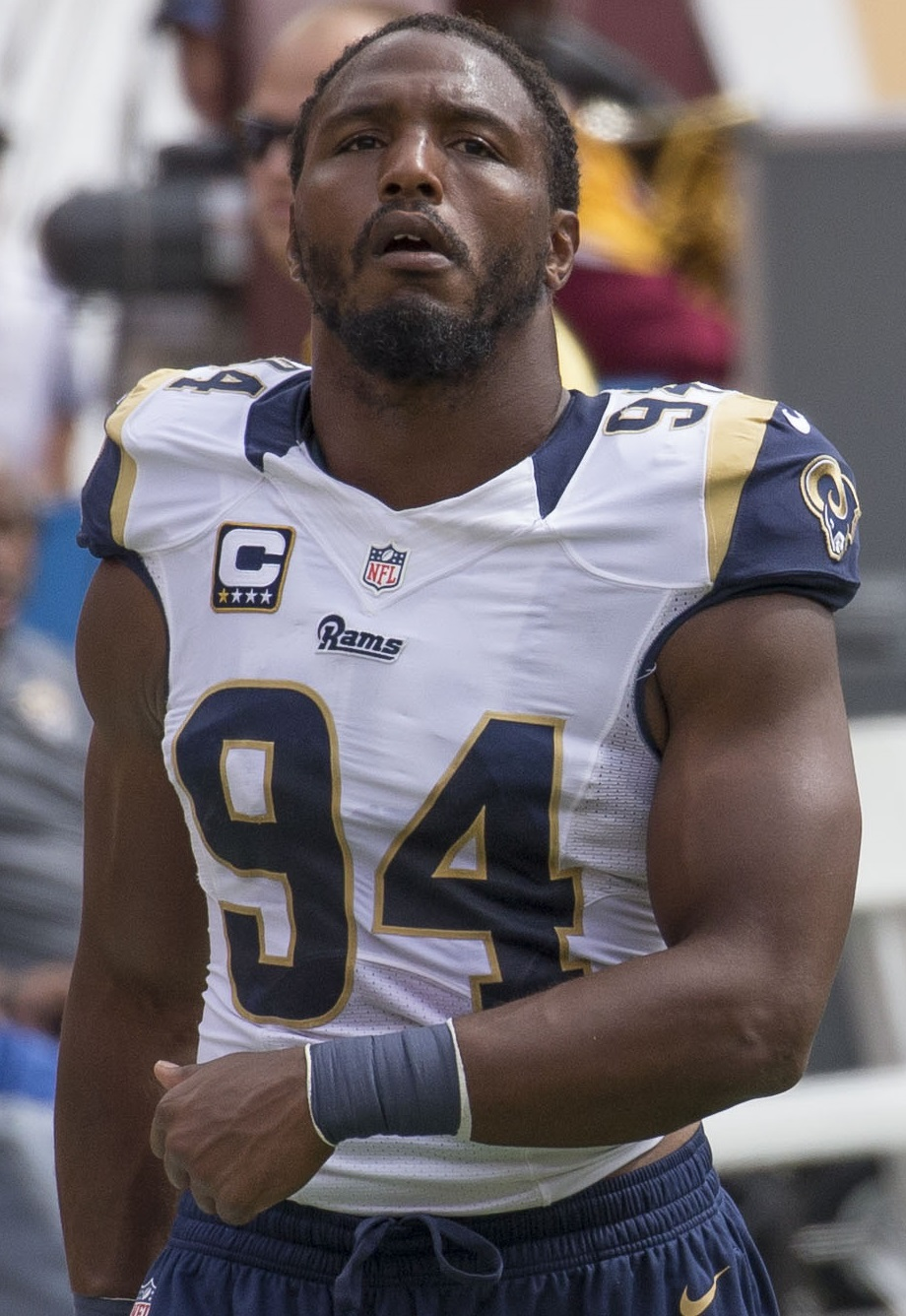
- Quinn with the St. Louis Rams in 2015

No. 94, 58, 98
- Position: Defensive end

Personal information
- Born: May 18, 1990 (age 36); Ladson, South Carolina, U.S.
- Listed height: 6 ft 4 in (1.93 m)
- Listed weight: 245 lb (111 kg)

Career information
- High school: Fort Dorchester (North Charleston, South Carolina)
- College: North Carolina (2008–2010)
- NFL draft: 2011: 1st round, 14th overall pick

Career history
- St. Louis / Los Angeles Rams (2011–2017); Miami Dolphins (2018); Dallas Cowboys (2019); Chicago Bears (2020–2022); Philadelphia Eagles (2022)

Awards and highlights
- First-team All-Pro (2013); Second-team All-Pro (2021); 3× Pro Bowl (2013, 2014, 2021); NFL forced fumbles co-leader (2014); Second-team All-American (2009); First-team All-ACC (2009); Brian Piccolo Award (2008)

Career NFL statistics
- Total tackles: 369
- Sacks: 102
- Forced fumbles: 32
- Fumble recoveries: 3
- Stats at Pro Football Reference

Robert Quinn (born May 18, 1990) is an American former professional football player who was a defensive end in the National Football League (NFL). He played college football for the North Carolina Tar Heels, and was selected by the St. Louis Rams with the 14th pick in the first round of the 2011 NFL draft.

== Early life ==
Quinn attended Fort Dorchester High School in North Charleston, South Carolina, where he played for the Fort Dorchester Patriots high school football team. As a senior, his season was shortened after undergoing brain surgery for a benign tumor. Quinn made a full recovery and was able to resume his football career. He registered 54 tackles, 10 tackles for loss, five sacks, and 21 quarterback hurries before the surgery. He was ranked the 19th best defensive end recruit by Scout.com and the 18th by Rivals.com He played in the 2008 U.S. Army All-American Bowl. He was also a 3-time heavyweight state champ in 4A wrestling.

== College career ==
Quinn attended the University of North Carolina at Chapel Hill, where he played for the North Carolina Tar Heels football team. As a freshman in 2008, Quinn started 12 of 13 games, recording 34 tackles (6.5 for losses) and two quarterback sacks and forced two fumbles. He was also named the ACC's Brian Piccolo Award winner as the league's most courageous player and finished third in the voting for the ACC Defensive Rookie of the Year honors.

As a sophomore in 2009, Quinn had 52 tackles and led the ACC and was 15th in the country in tackles for losses with 19.0 and was second in the league and 16th in the nation in sacks with 11.0 sacks. Additionally, he had three pass breakups and was second in the ACC and fourth in the country with six forced fumbles. For his efforts, he was a First-team All-ACC selection and was a Second-team All-American by CBS. He also finished second in the ACC Defensive Player of the Year voting.

As a junior in 2010, Quinn missed the season after he was ruled ineligible by the NCAA for lying to investigators about receiving travel accommodations and jewelry.

On November 19, 2013, the University of North Carolina sent a permanent disassociation letter to Quinn, Marvin Austin, and Greg Little for the improper benefits taken during their time at the university. The three athletes are prohibited from contacting current North Carolina athletes and are not allowed inside the Kenan Football Center or other athletic facilities on campus.

== Professional career ==
=== Pre-draft ===
Already in April 2010, Quinn was regarded as one of the top prospects for the 2011 NFL draft. Despite sitting out all of his junior season, he was still projected to be a top-10 selection in January 2011. His stock slightly dropped after the combine, projecting him at No. 11 in early March.

Pre-draft measurables
Height	Weight	Arm length	Hand span	Wingspan	40-yard dash	10-yard split	20-yard split	20-yard shuttle	Three-cone drill	Vertical jump	Broad jump	Bench press
6 ft 4 in (1.93 m)	265 lb (120 kg)	34 in (0.86 m)	10 1/8 in (0.26 m)	6 ft 9 7/8 in (2.08 m)	4.60 s	1.64 s	2.74 s	4.31 s	6.99 s	34 in (0.86 m)	10 ft 5 in (3.18 m)	24 reps
All values from NFL Combine or North Carolina Pro Day

=== St. Louis / Los Angeles Rams ===
==== 2011 ====
The St. Louis Rams selected Quinn in the first round (14th overall) of the 2011 NFL draft. Quinn was the second defensive end drafted in 2011 after J. J. Watt (11th overall).

On July 30, 2011, the St. Louis Rams signed Quinn to a fully guaranteed four-year, $9.43 million contract that includes a signing bonus of $4.77 million. Quinn arrived a day late to practice due to the birth of his first son. Throughout training camp, Quinn competed to be a starting defensive end against long time veteran James Hall. Head coach Steve Spagnuolo named Quinn the primary backup defensive end to start the season, behind veterans Chris Long and James Hall.

He made his professional regular season debut in the St. Louis Rams' Week 2 game at the New York Giants and made two solo tackles and recorded his first career sack as the Rams lost 28–16 on Monday Night Football. Quinn made his first career sack on Giants' quarterback Eli Manning for an eight-yard loss during the third quarter. On October 30, 2011, he recorded his second sack and blocked a punt against the New Orleans Saints, earning the NFC Special Teams Player of the Week Award for his effort. In Week 11, Quinn made a season-high five solo tackles and had one sack during a 24–7 loss against the Seattle Seahawks. On December 18, 2011, Quinn earned his first career start after James Hall sustained a knee injury. He recorded one tackle and a pass deflection as the Rams lost 20–13 against the Cincinnati Bengals. Quinn completed his rookie season with 23 combined tackles (20 solo), five sacks, three blocked punts, two pass deflections, and a forced fumble in 16 games and one start.

==== 2012 ====
On January 2, 2012, the St. Louis Rams fired head coach Steve Spagnuolo after they completed the season with a 4–12 record. On January 13, 2012, the St. Louis Rams hired former Tennessee Titans head coach Jeff Fisher. Head coach Jeff Fisher named Quinn and Chris Long the starting defensive ends to begin the regular season. On October 4, 2012, Quinn recorded six combined tackles (four solo) and a season-high three sacks on Kevin Kolb during a 17–3 win against the Arizona Cardinals. He finished the 2012 NFL season with 29 combined tackles (24 solo) and 10.5 sacks in 16 games and 14 starts.

==== 2013 ====
In Week 1 of the 2013 season against the Arizona Cardinals, Quinn tied his career high for sacks in a game with three, causing two fumbles and was also held once by Cardinal left tackle Levi Brown in a 27–24 Rams win in St. Louis. He was named the NFC Defensive Player of the Week on September 11, 2013. In Week 12, against the Chicago Bears, Quinn forced a fumble that was recovered for a touchdown by Chris Long. In Week 16, Quinn recorded three sacks against the Tampa Bay Buccaneers, passing Kevin Carter for the most sacks in a single season by a Ram with 18. Quinn finished with 19 sacks, 57 total tackles, one pass defended, seven forced fumbles, and two fumble recoveries. Quinn was awarded the 2013 PFWA Defensive Player of the Year award; in addition to being a consensus First-team All-Pro. He was ranked 13th by his fellow players on the NFL Top 100 Players of 2014.

==== 2014 ====
On September 13, 2014, Quinn signed a six-year extension with the Rams through the 2019 season. In the 2014 season, he recorded 10.5 sacks, 46 total tackles, six passes defended, and five forced fumbles. He earned a Pro Bowl nomination for the second consecutive year. He was ranked 44th by his fellow players on the NFL Top 100 Players of 2015.

==== 2015 ====
Quinn started out the 2015 season with two sacks in a 34–31 overtime victory over the Seattle Seahawks in Week 1. Due to injury, he appeared in eight games and finished with five sacks, 21 total tackles, three passes defensed, and three forced fumbles.

==== 2016 ====
On December 15, 2016, Quinn was placed on injured reserve with a concussion. In the 2016 season, he appeared in nine games and had four sacks, ten total tackles, two passes defended, and two forced fumbles.

==== 2017 ====
In the 2017 season, Quinn finished with 8.5 sacks, 32 total tackles (21 solo), one pass defensed, and two forced fumbles in 15 games.

=== Miami Dolphins ===
On March 14, 2018, Quinn was traded to the Miami Dolphins in exchange for a 2018 fourth-round draft pick (Brian Allen was selected with the pick) and a swap of sixth-round picks. He started all 16 games, finishing with a team-leading 6.5 sacks, along with 38 combined tackles and two forced fumbles.

=== Dallas Cowboys ===
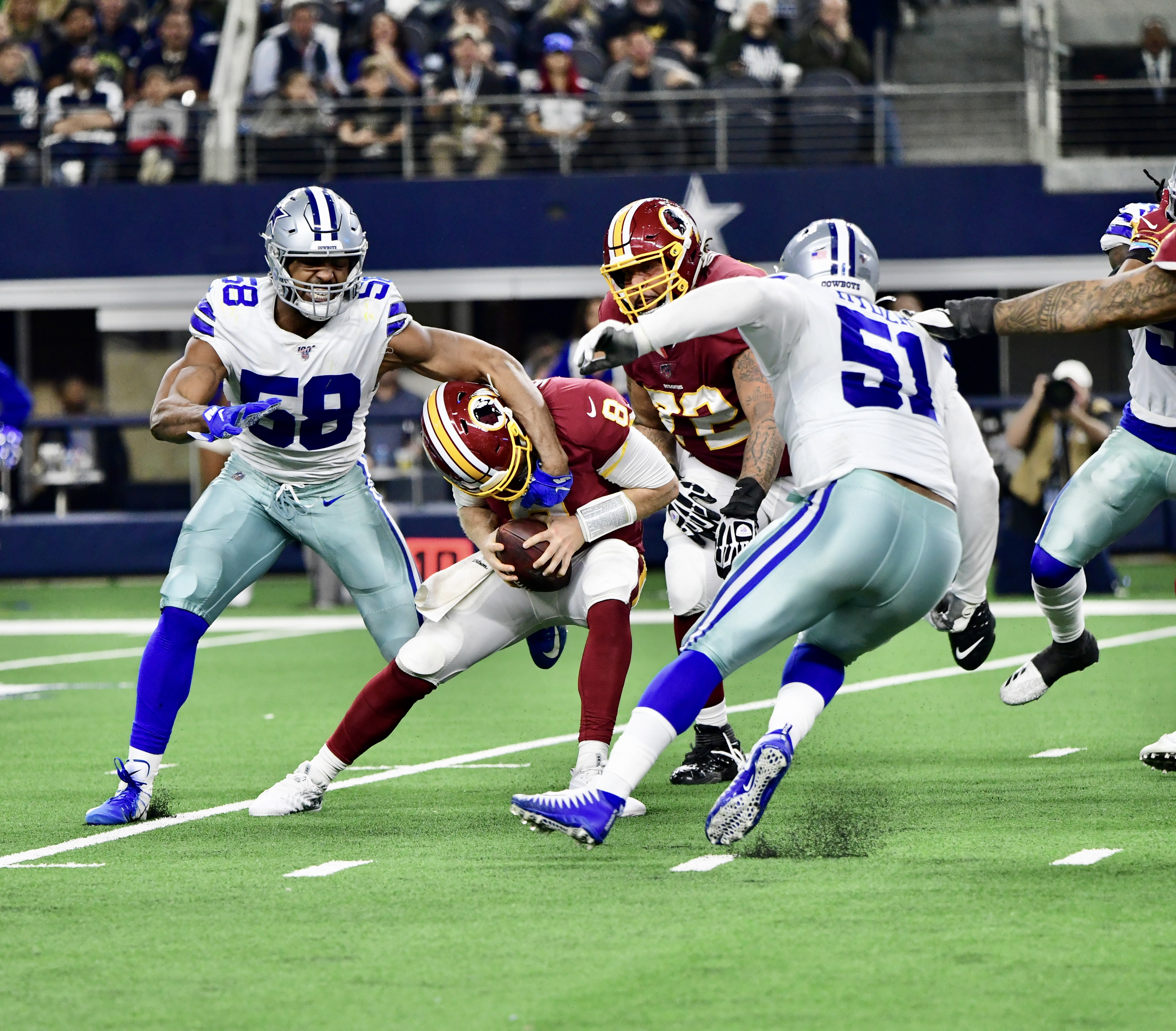
Quinn (left) in a 2019 game against the Washington Redskins

On March 28, 2019, Quinn was traded to the Dallas Cowboys in exchange for a 2020 sixth-round pick (#197–John Penisini). Because the jersey number 94 was taken by Randy Gregory, Quinn changed to jersey number 58 for the Cowboys. On August 6, he fractured his left hand during a training camp practice. On August 8, the league announced that Quinn was suspended the first two games of the 2019 season for a violation of the league's policy on performance-enhancing substances, which he stated was related to his anti-seizure medication. He was reinstated from suspension on September 16 and was named the starter at right defensive end.

In week 4 against the New Orleans Saints, Quinn sacked Teddy Bridgewater twice in the 12–10 loss. In week 6 against the New York Jets, Quinn sacked Sam Darnold twice in the 24–22 loss. In week 7 against the Philadelphia Eagles, Quinn recorded a sack on Carson Wentz before leaving the game with a rib injury. Without Quinn, the Cowboys won 37–10. He finished the season with 25 tackles, 11.5 sacks (led the team), 37 quarterback pressures, three passes defensed and two forced fumbles.

=== Chicago Bears ===
On April 1, 2020, Quinn signed a five-year, $70 million contract with the Chicago Bears.

Quinn switched back to jersey number 94 with the Bears. He made his debut with the Bears in Week 2 against the New York Giants. Quinn missed the previous week's game due to an ankle injury. During the game, Quinn recorded his first sack as a Bear on Daniel Jones in the 17–13 win. Quinn's sack forced Jones to fumble the football which was recovered by teammate Khalil Mack. In Week 7 against his former team, the Los Angeles Rams, on Monday Night Football, Quinn forced a fumble on former teammate Robert Woods which was returned for a touchdown by Eddie Jackson during the 24–10 loss.

The following season, on November 9, 2021, Quinn recorded a career high 3 1/2 sacks in a 16–14 loss against the Baltimore Ravens. On December 2, Quinn was named NFC Defensive Player of the month for November. He was the first player to win the award for the Bears since Eddie Jackson in 2018.

On December 20, Quinn was selected to his third Pro Bowl. On January 2, 2022, Quinn recorded his 18th sack of the season during a Week 17 game against the New York Giants, which eclipsed the Bears' previous single-season franchise sack record (17.5) set by Richard Dent in 1984. Quinn finished the season with 18.5 sacks, just short of his career best of 19 he set back in 2013. Quinn was named second-team All-Pro by the Associated Press. He was ranked 48th by his fellow players on the NFL Top 100 Players of 2022.

=== Philadelphia Eagles ===
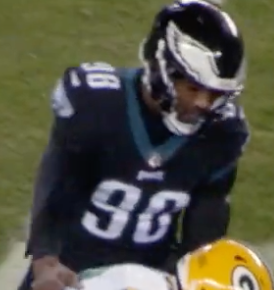
Quinn with the Philadelphia Eagles in 2022

Quinn was traded to the Philadelphia Eagles in exchange for a fourth round selection in the 2023 NFL draft on October 26, 2022. Two days later, Quinn and the Eagles mutually agreed to void the final two years of his contract, making him eligible for free agency following the season. He was placed on injured reserve on December 6, prior to undergoing arthroscopic knee surgery. He was activated on January 7, 2023. Quinn reached Super Bowl LVII, but the Eagles lost 38–35 to the Kansas City Chiefs.

== Career statistics ==
Legend
	Led the league
**Bold**	Career high

=== NFL ===
Year	Team	Games		Tackles				Fumbles				Interceptions					
Year	Team	GP	GS	Cmb	Solo	Ast	Sck	FF	FR	Yds	TD	PD	Int	Yds	Avg	Lng	TD
2011	STL	15	1	23	20	3	5.0	1	—	—	—	2	—	—	—	—	—
2012	STL	16	14	29	24	5	10.5	1	—	—	—	2	—	—	—	—	—
2013	STL	16	16	**57**	**50**	7	**19.0**	**7**	**2**	**33**	**1**	1	—	—	—	—	—
2014	STL	16	16	46	39	7	10.5	5	—	—	—	**6**	—	—	—	—	—
2015	STL	8	7	21	13	8	5.0	3	—	—	—	3	—	—	—	—	—
2016	LAR	9	8	10	8	2	4.0	2	—	—	—	2	—	—	—	—	—
2017	LAR	15	14	32	21	11	8.5	2	—	—	—	1	—	—	—	—	—
2018	MIA	16	16	38	25	**13**	6.5	2	—	—	—	0	—	—	—	—	—
2019	DAL	14	14	34	26	8	11.5	2	—	—	—	3	—	—	—	—	—
2020	CHI	15	13	20	14	6	2.0	3	1	—	—	0	—	—	—	—	—
2021	CHI	16	16	49	38	11	18.5	4	—	—	—	0	—	—	—	—	—
2022	CHI	7	7	8	6	2	1.0	—	—	—	—	0	—	—	—	—	—
2022	PHI	6	0	2	2	0	0.0	—	—	—	—	0	—	—	—	—	—
Career		169	142	369	286	83	102.0	32	3	33	1	20	0	0	0.0	0	0

=== College ===
Season	Team	GP	Tackles				
Season	Team	GP	Cmb	Solo	Ast	Sck	FF
2008	UNC	12	34	22	12	2.0	2
2009	UNC	13	**52**	**35**	**17**	**11.0**	**6**
2010	UNC	0	Ruled ineligible				
Career		25	86	57	29	13.0	8

== Personal life ==
Quinn's mother is from Puerto Rico. Quinn is the brother of Olympic gold medalist Puerto Rican hurdler Jasmine Camacho-Quinn.

=== Legal issues ===
On August 18, 2023, Quinn was arrested in Summerville, South Carolina and charged with seven counts including assault and battery and hit and run.

On January 10, 2025, Quinn was arrested in North Charleston, South Carolina on charges of leaving the scene of an accident, which included property damage and reckless driving, following a car crash that involved multiple vehicles.
