= Kevin Long (offensive lineman) =

American football player (born 1975)

No. 60
- Position: Center

Personal information
- Born: May 2, 1975 (age 51); Summerville, South Carolina, U.S.
- Listed height: 6 ft 5 in (1.96 m)
- Listed weight: 296 lb (134 kg)

Career information
- High school: Summerville
- College: Florida State
- NFL draft: 1998: 7th round, 229th overall pick

Career history
- Tennessee Oilers/Titans (1998–2001); Jacksonville Jaguars (2002)*
- * Offseason or practice squad member only

Awards and highlights
- PFWA All-Rookie Team (1998); First-team All-American (1997); Second-team All-ACC (1997); 2× Sugar Bowl champion (1995, 1998); Orange Bowl champion (Jan. 1996)

Career NFL statistics
- Games played: 63
- Games started: 35
- Fumble recoveries: 2
- Stats at Pro Football Reference

Kevin Dale Long (born May 2, 1975) is an American former professional football player who was a center for four seasons in the National Football League (NFL) with the Tennessee Oilers/Titans. He started in Super Bowl XXXIV. He was selected in the seventh round of the 1998 NFL draft with the 229th overall pick.

== Early life and college ==
Long graduated from Summerville High School of his birthplace Summerville, South Carolina in 1993. As a high school football player, Long earned honorable mention All-America honors from USA Today. After redshirting the 1993 season, Long lettered in football for four seasons (1994–1997) at Florida State University.
