= Jamar Nesbit =

American football player (born 1976)

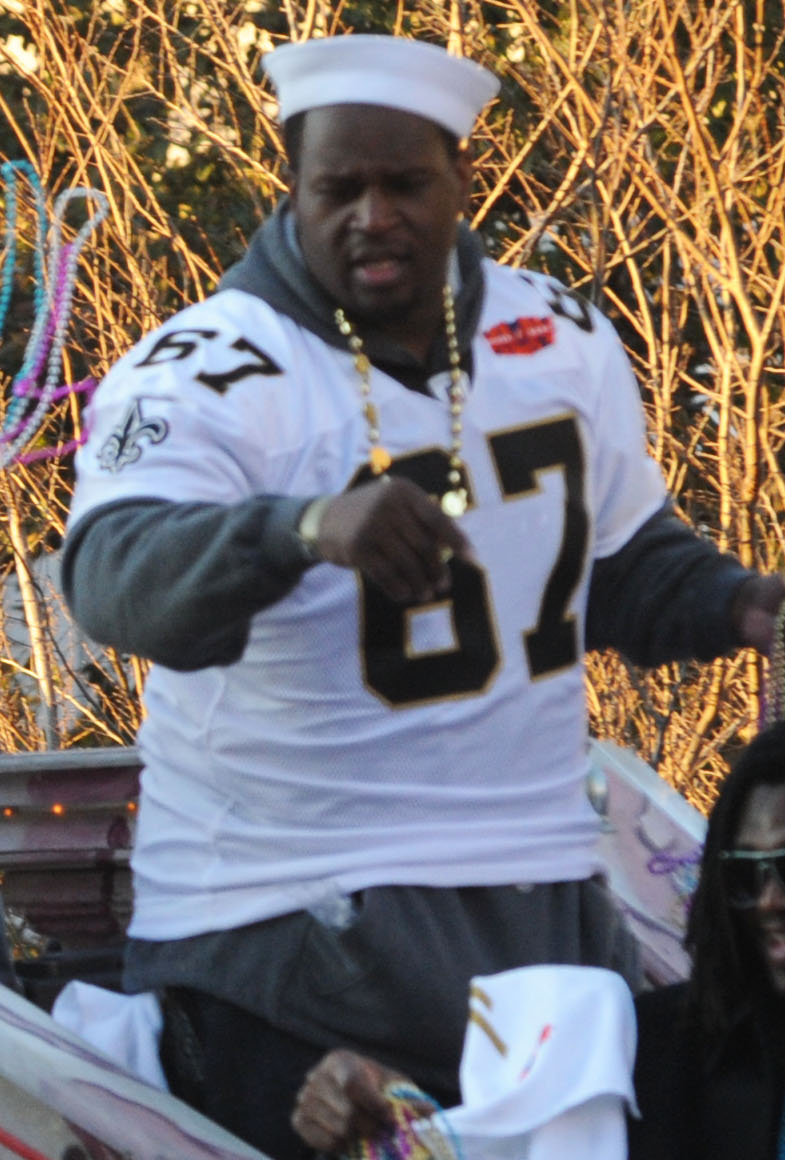
- Nesbit at the 2010 Saints Super Bowl parade

No. 63, 64, 67
- Position: Guard

Personal information
- Born: December 17, 1976 (age 49); Heidelberg, West Germany
- Listed height: 6 ft 4 in (1.93 m)
- Listed weight: 328 lb (149 kg)

Career information
- High school: Summerville (Summerville, South Carolina, U.S.)
- College: South Carolina
- NFL draft: 1999: undrafted

Career history
- Carolina Panthers (1999–2002); Jacksonville Jaguars (2003); New Orleans Saints (2004–2009)

Awards and highlights
- Super Bowl champion (XLIV); Second-team All-SEC (1997)

Career NFL statistics
- Games played: 153
- Games started: 90
- Fumble recoveries: 3
- Stats at Pro Football Reference

Jamar Kendric Nesbit (born December 17, 1976) is an American former professional football player who was a guard in the National Football League (NFL). He was signed by the Carolina Panthers as an undrafted free agent in 1999. He played college football for the South Carolina Gamecocks football. Nesbit has also played for the Jacksonville Jaguars and New Orleans Saints.

He was suspended for four games during the 2008–2009 season for using a performance-enhancing drug. He had been using StarCaps to drop water weight, which contained the illegal loop diuretic bumetanide, which is used to mask steroids or performance-enhancing drugs (PEDs). While serving his suspension, he lost his starting job to Carl Nicks. In 2010, Nesbit sued the NFL, claiming that they knew that bumetanide (a prescription medication) was in StarCaps (an over the counter product recommended by the New Orleans Saints training staff), but they did not notify any of the players.

== Early life and college ==
He played football at Summerville High School and was part of the Green Wave for John McKissick, the winningest American football coach. He played college football at the University of South Carolina.

== Professional career ==
Pre-draft measurables
Height	Weight	Arm length	Hand span	40-yard dash	10-yard split	20-yard split	20-yard shuttle	Three-cone drill	Vertical jump	Broad jump	Bench press
6 ft 4 1/4 in (1.94 m)	336 lb (152 kg)	34 1/8 in (0.87 m)	9 in (0.23 m)	5.70 s	1.99 s	3.28 s	4.91 s	8.00 s	26.5 in (0.67 m)	7 ft 4 in (2.24 m)	23 reps
All values from NFL Combine

=== Carolina Panthers ===
After going undrafted in the 1999 NFL draft, he signed as a free agent with Carolina Panthers.

=== Jacksonville Jaguars ===
In 2003, he signed with the Jacksonville Jaguars.

=== New Orleans Saints ===
He signed with the New Orleans Saints. In 2009, Nesbit won his first Super Bowl ring with the New Orleans Saints.

== Personal life ==
Nesbit's son, Bryson, currently with the Minnesota Vikings as an undrafted rookie free agent, was an all-conference tight end for the North Carolina Tar Heels. His other son Michael, is a wide receiver for Brown University.
