= Ashley Ridge High School =

Location
- 9800 Delemar Highway; Summerville, South Carolina 29485; United States; 32°55′27″N 80°14′1″W

Information
- Type: Public
- Established: 2008 (18 years ago)
- School district: Dorchester School District Two
- Principal: Brooke Matthews
- Teaching staff: 135.80 (FTE)
- Grades: 9–12
- Enrollment: 2,735 (2023–2024)
- Student to teacher ratio: 20.14
- Colors: Cardinal and gold
- Song: "Cardinal And Gold"
- Mascot: Swamp Fox
- Rival: Summerville, Fort Dorchester
- Website: www.ddtwo.org/arhs

Ashley Ridge High School is a secondary school located in Dorchester County, South Carolina, United States. It is the newest high school in Dorchester School District Two. The school opened in August 2008.

== Athletics ==
=== Sports Offered ===
Ashley Ridge offers 11 sports in total; with both men's and women's teams.

=== Achievements and History ===
==== Football ====
The Swamp Foxes' have posted notable back to back seasons in the 2024-25 (8-3) and 25-26 (8-4) school year under head coach Jeff Tate, making the playoffs both years.

==== Wrestling ====
The Swamp Foxes have kept a consistent decent record over the course of the programs history, most notably winning a state title in 2022.

==== Soccer ====
The boy's soccer team is notable in the state, most recently becoming a Class 5A state finalist in 2025 and retrieving a state title in 2023 under the 5A classification as well.

== Musical Arts ==
=== Marching Band ===
Over the course of the schools short history up until now, it has actually been decently successful, as the marching band has been known to place close to or around it's sibling schools in the district (Summerville High School and Fort Dorchester Highschool) which both have much older programs. In the past few years, Ashley Ridge has even placed higher in multiple performance competitions against Fort Dorchester High School.

In 2009, the band qualified for the state finals in the 2A division at the South Carolina Band Direction Association championship.

=== Ensembles ===
The ARHS winter ensembles are the first teams to achieve state titles in ARHS school history. The winter guard won state in 2010, 2012, 2013, and 2022,and won second place in 2026 the indoor percussion ensemble won state in 2010, 2011, and 2013 state.

== Facilities ==
In the 2014–2015 school year, construction began on an extension of the fine arts hallway and the parking lots.

After complaints due to overcrowding in the school as Summerville's greater area grows, a project was constructed over the summer before the 2026-2027 school year where the old Athletics Weight Room was moved into the prior band room in the G wing of the school with leftover equipment sent into other musical arts classrooms. In place of the old weight room is a hallway to relieve congested foot traffic between the Athletics and JROTC hallway, as well as multiple offices and classrooms; mostly for visual arts students. On top of these new additions, an entire new wing of the school was also constructed in which serves all musical arts classes in the school; with the band room being the biggest one.
