= P. J. Morlando =

American baseball player (born 2005)

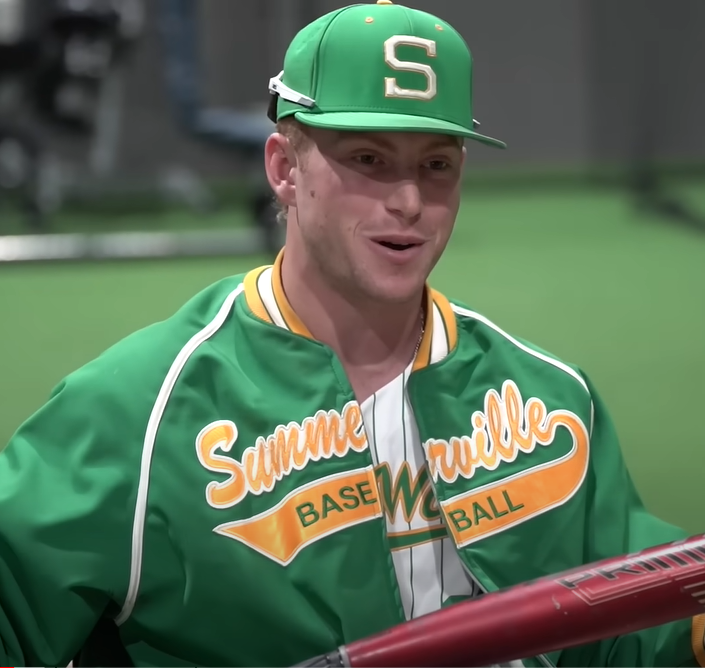
- Morlando in 2024

Miami Marlins
- Outfielder
- Born: May 16, 2005 (age 21); Prince George's County, Maryland, U.S.
- Bats: Left Throws: Right

Perry William "P.J." Morlando (born May 16, 2005) is an American professional baseball outfielder in the Miami Marlins organization.

== Amateur career ==
Morlando attended Summerville High School in Summerville, South Carolina, where he played baseball. As a sophomore in 2022, he hit nine home runs and had 23 RBIs. As a junior in 2023, he batted .463 with six home runs and 19 RBIs. That summer, Morlando won the 2023 High School Home Run Derby at T-Mobile Park and was named MVP of the High School All-American Game. He also was named to USA Baseball's 18U team. As a senior in 2024, Morlando hit .392 with two home runs and reached base more than 60% of the time, often being pitched around. He committed to play college baseball at the University of South Carolina.

== Professional career ==
Morlando was drafted by the Miami Marlins in the first round, with the 16th overall selection of the 2024 Major League Baseball draft. On July 19, 2024, Morlando signed with the Marlins on a contract worth $3.4 million. He played in one game for the Single–A Jupiter Hammerheads, going 0–for–1. On August 9, it was announced that Morlando would miss the remainder of the season after suffering a lumbar stress reaction.

On March 13, 2025, Morlando was ruled out for 8-to-10 weeks after undergoing an ulnar nerve transposition on his non-throwing elbow. He made his season debut in June with the Florida Complex League Marlins before being assigned to Jupiter. Over 58 games, Morlando hit .215 with five home runs, 30 RBI, and eight stolen bases. He was assigned to play in the Arizona Fall League with the Mesa Solar Sox after the season. Morlando played the 2026 season with Jupiter and batted .209 with nine home runs and 35 RBI across 88 games.
