= 1998 All-Atlantic Coast Conference football team =

American college football all-star team

The 1998 All-Atlantic Coast Conference football team consists of American football players chosen by various selectors for their All-Atlantic Coast Conference ("ACC") teams for the 1998 college football season. Selectors in 1998 included the Associated Press (AP).

== Offensive selections ==
=== Wide receivers ===
- Torry Holt, NC State (AP-1)
- Peter Warrick, Florida State (AP-1)
- Dez White, Georgia Tech (AP-2)
- Desmond Clark, Wake Forest (AP-2)

=== Tackles ===
- Robert Hunt, Virginia (AP-1)
- Ross Brannon, Florida State (AP-1)
- Holland Postell, Clemson (AP-2)
- Ian Rafferty, NC State (AP-2)

=== Guards ===
- Jason Whitaker, Florida State (AP-1)
- Noel LaMontagne, Virginia (AP-1)
- Corey Hulsey, Clemson (AP-2)
- Jason Burks, Georgia Tech (AP-2)

=== Centers ===
- Craig Page, Georgia Tech (AP-1)
- John St. Clair, Virginia (AP-2)

=== Tight ends ===
- Casey Crawford, Virginia (AP-1)
- Myron Jackson, Florida State (AP-2)

=== Quarterbacks ===
- Joe Hamilton, Georgia Tech (AP-1)
- Jamie Barnette, NC State (AP-2)

=== Running backs ===
- Thomas Jones, Virginia (AP-1)
- Travis Minor, Florida State (AP-1)
- LaMont Jordan, Maryland (AP-2)
- Antoine Womack, Virginia (AP-2)

== Defensive selections ==
=== Defensive linemen ===
- Corey Simon, Florida State (AP-1)
- Patrick Kerney, Virginia (AP-1)
- Ebenezer Ekuban, North Carolina (AP-1)
- Chris Combs, Duke (AP-1)
- Adrian Dingle, Clemson (AP-2)
- Jesse Tarplin, Georgia Tech (AP-2)
- Tony Bryant, Florida State (AP-2)
- Larry Smith, Florida State (AP-2)

=== Linebackers ===
- Lamont Green, Florida State (AP-1)
- Eric Barton, Maryland (AP-1)
- Walt Rainer, Virginia (AP-1)
- Rahim Abdullah, Clemson (AP-2)
- Brandon Spoon, North Carolina (AP-2)
- Keith Newman, North Carolina (AP-2)

=== Defensive backs ===
- Anthony Poindexter, Virginia (AP-1)
- Antwan Edwards, Clemson
- Dré Bly, North Carolina (AP-1)
- Lloyd Harrison, NC State (AP-1)
- Mario Edwards, Florida State (AP-2)
- Tay Cody, Florida State (AP-2)
- Dexter Jackson, Florida State (AP-2)
- Travares Tillman, Georgia Tech (AP-2)

== Special teams ==
=== Placekickers ===
- Sebastian Janikowski, Florida State (AP-1)
- Sims Lenhardt, Duke (AP-2)

=== Punters ===
- Rodney Williams, Georgia Tech (AP-1)
- Brian Schmitz, North Carolina (AP-2)

=== Return specialist ===
- Torry Holt, NC State(AP-1)
- Charlie Rogers, Georgia Tech (AP-2)

== Key ==
AP = Associated Press

== See also ==
- 1998 College Football All-America Team
