= Lloyd Harrison =

Jamaican gridiron football player (born 1977)

No. 41, 22, 20
- Position: Cornerback

Personal information
- Born: June 21, 1977 (age 49); Kingston, Jamaica
- Listed height: 5 ft 11 in (1.80 m)
- Listed weight: 190 lb (86 kg)

Career information
- High school: Sewanhaka (Floral Park, New York, U.S.)
- College: North Carolina State
- NFL draft: 2000: 3rd round, 64th overall pick

Career history
- Washington Redskins (2000); San Diego Chargers (2001); Miami Dolphins (2002); Washington Redskins (2003)*
- * Offseason or practice squad member only

Awards and highlights
- Third-team All-American (1999); 2× First-team All-ACC (1998, 1999)

Career NFL statistics
- Tackles: 19
- Sacks: 1
- Stats at Pro Football Reference

Lloyd Harrison (born June 21, 1977) is a former American football cornerback. He was selected to play in the National Football League (NFL) in the third round of the 2000 NFL draft and played for the Washington Redskins, San Diego Chargers, and Miami Dolphins. Harrison played college football at North Carolina State University.

== Early life ==
Harrison spent his early years in the East Flatbush area of Brooklyn before relocating to Long Island with his family. He attended P.S. 208 elementary school, Meyer Levin Junior High School, and Lafayette High School in Brooklyn. Later, he attended Sewanhaka Central High School in Floral Park, New York.

== College career ==
During his tenure at North Carolina State University (NC State), Harrison made contributions to both the football and track teams. While participating in track, he was part of the NC State's 4X100 relay team, which won a conference championship in 1996. In football, Harrison was a three-year starting cornerback, concluding his college career with 190 tackles (nine for loss), 12 interceptions, 40 passes defended, one sack, two fumble recoveries, five forced fumbles, and four blocked kicks. He was named the All-American second-team and the All-Atlantic Coast Conference first-team twice, and was a semifinalist for the Jim Thorpe Award, which is awarded to the nation's highest-ranking defensive back. Harrison was First team All-ACC in 1998 & 1999.

== Professional career ==
Harrison was selected 64th overall in the third round by the Washington Redskins in the 2000 NFL Draft. While in the NFL, Harrison played with the Washington Redskins, San Diego Chargers, and Miami Dolphins; he assumed the role of cornerback.
