= Summerville High School =

Coordinates: 32°59′40″N 80°13′06″W

Location
- 1101 Boone Hill Road; Summerville, South Carolina 29483; United States

Information
- Type: Public
- Established: 1960 (66 years ago)
- School district: Dorchester School District Two
- Principal: Michelle Leviner
- Teaching staff: 159.90 (FTE)
- Grades: 9–12
- Enrollment: 3,293 (2023–2024)
- Student to teacher ratio: 20.59
- Colors: Green and gold
- Team name: Green Wave
- Rivals: Fort Dorchester High School, Ashley Ridge High School, Berkeley High School
- Yearbook: The Green Wave
- Website: shs.ddtwo.org

Summerville High School is a public high school in Summerville, South Carolina.

== History ==
Until the 1960s, a brick building on Main Street, which was once Rollings Middle School of the Arts, and now is the district building for all schools in the Dorchester area, was the only high school in the Summerville area. As Summerville's population increased rapidly in the late 1960s and early 1970s, a larger campus was needed. In 1969, the present building on Boone Hill Road was opened to students. From the first day of classes, the new facility was too small. Because of the unexpectedly high enrollment, several mobile units were set up on the campus.

In 1970, Summerville High School and Alston High School were combined to integrate the school district. Attendance continued to increase throughout the 1970s. In 1972, double sessions were used until an additional underclassman campus was completed in 1975. Another classroom wing was created by the spring of 1978.

In 1992, Fort Dorchester High School was opened, splitting the school's student body. As a result, the Gregg underclassman campus was renovated as a middle school, and the switch to a single campus was completed in 1998. Construction of a fine arts hall and cafeteria expansion was completed in the fall of 2001.

In 2008, Ashley Ridge High School was opened to further ease congestion in the Dorchester District Two school system. When attendance zones were realigned for the opening of the new high school, the Ashley Ridge zone contained mostly students who would have attended Summerville high school, whereas only a small portion of the Fort Dorchester attendance zone was diverted.

== Statistics ==
As of 2004, Summerville has a 78.9% graduation rate. However, the school has a 97.3% passing rate of the state's standardized exit exam.

== Athletics ==
=== Wrestling ===
In total, Summerville wrestling has won 12 state championships: 1981, 1987, 1988, 1992, 1993, 1998, 2001, 2002, 2004, 2005, 2006, and 2008. The program has had several high school individual state champions, All-Americans, a USA Wrestling National Assistant Coach of the Year, and a USA Wrestling Man of the Year.

=== Football ===
The football team has won 12 state championships. John McKissick served as head coach from 1952 to 2014. His 621 wins is the second most by any level coach behind John T. Curtis, Jr. (640) of Louisiana.

=== Baseball ===
Summerville has won a total of five 4A baseball state championships. Their most recent championship was won in 2016.

=== Swimming ===
Summerville swimming has a total of four team state championships: two girls in 2000 and 2001, and two boys in 2003 and 2004.

=== Track and field ===
In 2011, the Lady Green Wave won the state track and field meet. In 1985, one student achieved All-American status, a World ranking in the Decathlon, and was named the University of South Carolina's track athlete of the decade for the 1980s. In 2016, the Lady Green Wave etched their name in the history books as the girls 400m hurdle state record was broken by Imagine Patterson who went on to win four consecutive state titles in the 400m hurdles from 2015 to 2018, two consecutive 100m hurdle state championships in the 2017 and 2018 seasons, and two consecutive USATF Junior Olympic National Championships in the 400m hurdles in 2016 and 2017.

=== Soccer ===
In 1996, the girls' team won the state 4A State Championships.

Cross Country

In 1993, the boy's team won the 4A state title beating out Spartanburg High School by 1 point. In 2001 and 2003 the girl's team won 4A state championships. Since 2018, the boys have won 6 region titles and never placed outside the top 2. Since 2018, the girls team has won 7 region titles and only placed 2nd once.

== Marching band ==
The Summerville Marching Band (SHSCPE) is a six-time South Carolina state champion, winning most recently in 2014.

== Notable alumni ==
- Walter Bailey, lawyer
- Zack Bailey, NFL offensive lineman
- Mark Blount, NBA basketball player; transferred to Oak Hill Academy
- Christopher Celiz, Medal of Honor recipient
- Con Chellis, insurance agent and politician
- Jenn Colella, comedian, actress, and singer
- Janet Cone, college athletic director for the UNC Asheville Bulldogs
- Sam Esmail, moved before graduation; television producer known for Mr. Robot and Homecoming
- Dustin Fry, NFL center
- Gil Gatch, attorney, politician, and former pastor
- Kelontae Gavin, American gospel singer and worship leader
- A. J. Green, NFL wide receiver, two-time All-Pro and seven-time Pro Bowl selection with the Cincinnati Bengals
- Shanola Hampton, actress
- De'Angelo Henderson, NFL running back
- Steven Jackson, MLB pitcher
- Keith Jennings, NFL tight end
- Stanford Jennings, NFL running back
- Kevin Long, NFL center
- PJ Morlando, baseball player
- Louis Mulkey, Charleston firefighter, one of the "Charleston Nine"
- Chris Murphy, attorney and politician
- Jamar Nesbit, NFL offensive guard, Super Bowl XLIV champion with the New Orleans Saints
- Carvin Nkanata, American-born Kenyan athlete specializing in the sprinting events
- Chase Page, NFL defensive tackle
- Ian Rafferty, NFL offensive lineman
- Johnny Wactor, actor
