= Carlos Dunlap =

American football player (born 1989)

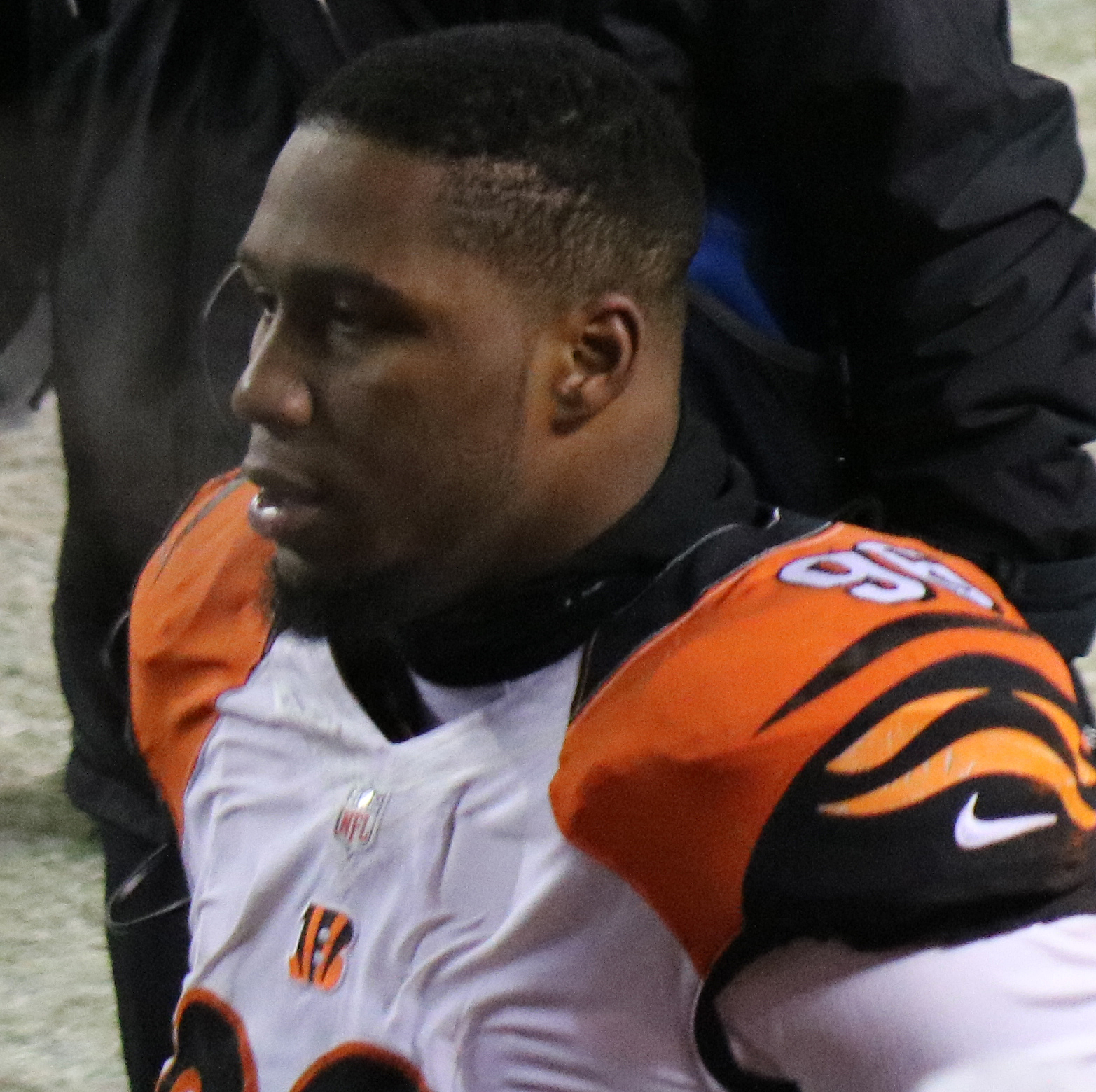
- Dunlap with the Cincinnati Bengals in 2015

No. 96, 43, 8
- Position: Defensive end

Personal information
- Born: February 28, 1989 (age 37); North Charleston, South Carolina, U.S.
- Listed height: 6 ft 6 in (1.98 m)
- Listed weight: 285 lb (129 kg)

Career information
- High school: Fort Dorchester (North Charleston)
- College: Florida (2007–2009)
- NFL draft: 2010: 2nd round, 54th overall pick

Career history
- Cincinnati Bengals (2010–2020); Seattle Seahawks (2020–2021); Kansas City Chiefs (2022)

Awards and highlights
- Super Bowl champion (LVII); 2× Pro Bowl (2015, 2016); PFWA NFL All-Rookie Team (2010); BCS national champion (2008); First-team All-SEC (2009); Second-team All-SEC (2008)

Career NFL statistics
- Tackles: 578
- Sacks: 100
- Forced fumbles: 22
- Fumble recoveries: 9
- Pass deflections: 77
- Interceptions: 2
- Defensive touchdowns: 3
- Stats at Pro Football Reference

Carlos Dunlap (born February 28, 1989) is an American former professional football player who was a defensive end in the National Football League (NFL). He played college football for the Florida Gators, who won the 2009 BCS National Championship Game. He was selected by the Cincinnati Bengals in the second round of the 2010 NFL draft. During his last season, he won Super Bowl LVII as a member of the Kansas City Chiefs.

== Early life ==
Dunlap was born in North Charleston, South Carolina. He attended Fort Dorchester High School in North Charleston, where he played for the Fort Dorchester Patriots high school football team. During his junior year, he made 103 tackles, 22 for loss and 9 quarterback sacks. As a senior, he recorded 105 tackles, 35 for loss and 24 sacks and was chosen to play in the first Offense-Defense All-American Bowl.

Considered a five-star recruit by Rivals.com, Dunlap was listed as the No. 1 weakside defensive end in the nation in 2007. He chose Florida over offers from Clemson, South Carolina, Auburn, and Tennessee.

== College career ==
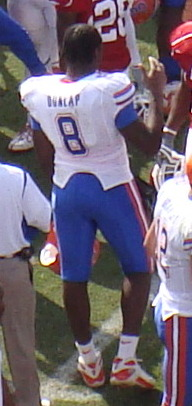
Dunlap with the Florida Gators in 2008

Dunlap accepted an athletic scholarship to attend the University of Florida in Gainesville, Florida, where he played for coach Urban Meyer's Gators teams from 2007 to 2009.

As a true freshman in 2007, he played in 13 games, recording seven tackles and a quarterback sack. As a sophomore in 2008, Dunlap played in all 14 of the Gators games recording 39 tackles, a team-high 9.5 sacks and three blocked punts. He was the defensive MVP of the Gators win over the Oklahoma Sooners in the 2009 BCS National Championship Game, recording four tackles, and a shared sack during the game. He also was a second-team All-SEC selection.

As a junior in 2009, Dunlap played in 13 games. He missed one game, the SEC Championship, due to suspension after being arrested on driving under the influence of alcohol. During the season, he recorded 38 tackles and nine sacks and was a consensus first-team All-SEC selection. He ended his career with 84 tackles, 19.5 sacks, and three blocked kicks. After his junior year, Dunlap decided to forgo his senior season and enter the 2010 NFL draft.

== Professional career ==
After his sophomore season, Dunlap was projected to be a first round and a possible top ten selection in 2010. His draft stock began to fall after a mediocre junior season and a DUI arrest. On January 11, 2010, it was announced that Dunlap would forgo his remaining eligibility and enter the 2010 NFL draft. Dunlap attended the NFL Scouting Combine and performed all of the combine and positional drills. His overall combine performance was said to be underwhelming by multiple scouts, and he did not impress team representatives during the interview process.

External videos
- Carlos Dunlap's NFL Combine Workout
- Carlos Dunlap's 40-yard dash

On March 17, 2010, Dunlap attended Florida's pro day and chose to perform multiple combine drills again. He improved his 40-yard dash (4.61s), 20-yard dash (2.68s), 10-yard dash (1.60s), bench press (22), and broad jump (9'4"). At the conclusion of the pre-draft process, Dunlap was projected to be a second round pick by NFL draft experts and scouts. He was ranked as the third best defensive end prospect by NFL analyst Mike Mayock, the fourth best defensive end by Scouts Inc., and was ranked the fifth best defensive end in the draft by DraftScout.com.

Pre-draft measurables
Height	Weight	Arm length	Hand span	40-yard dash	10-yard split	20-yard split	20-yard shuttle	Three-cone drill	Vertical jump	Broad jump	Bench press	Wonderlic
6 ft 5 3/4 in (1.97 m)	277 lb (126 kg)	34 5/8 in (0.88 m)	10 in (0.25 m)	4.71 s	1.65 s	2.76 s	4.61 s	7.21 s	31 1/2 in (0.80 m)	9 ft 3 in (2.82 m)	21 reps	26
All values are from NFL Combine

=== Cincinnati Bengals ===
==== 2010 ====
The Cincinnati Bengals selected Dunlap in the second round (54th overall) of the 2010 NFL draft. Dunlap was the tenth defensive end drafted in 2010.

External videos
- Carlos Dunlap's NFL Draft Vignette

On July 28, 2010, the Cincinnati Bengals signed Dunlap to a four-year, $3.71 million contract that included $1.77 million guaranteed and a signing bonus of $1.22 million.

Throughout training camp, Dunlap competed to be a backup defensive end against Jonathan Fanene and Frostee Rucker. Head coach Marvin Lewis named him the fifth defensive end on the depth chart to begin the regular season, behind Robert Geathers, Antwan Odom, Frostee Rucker, and Jonathan Fanene.

Dunlap was inactive as a healthy scratch for the first two games of the regular season. On September 26, 2010, Dunlap made his professional regular season debut during the Bengals' 20–7 victory at the Carolina Panthers in Week 3. Dunlap was inactive for another two games (Weeks 4–5), but made his return in Week 7 during a 39–32 loss at the Atlanta Falcons. During the game, he made his first career tackle on running back Jason Snelling to stop a four-yard gain in the fourth quarter. Dunlap was elevated on the depth chart after Antwan Odom was suspended and Johnathan Fanene and Frostee Rucker sustained injuries. Fanene, Odom, and Rucker were all placed on injured reserve where they would end the season. On November 14, 2010, Dunlap recorded two solo tackles and made his first career sack during a 23–17 loss at the Indianapolis Colts in Week 10. Dunlap made his first career sack on quarterback Peyton Manning for a four-yard loss in the second quarter. In Week 14, he collected a season-high four combined tackles and was credited with half a sack in the Bengals' 23–7 loss at the Pittsburgh Steelers. On November 25, 2010, Dunlap made three solo tackles and had two sacks on quarterback Mark Sanchez during a 26–10 loss at the New York Jets in Week 12. He earned his first multi-sack performance of his career with his two sacks. Dunlap finished his rookie season in 2010 with 24 combined tackles (19 solo), 9.5 sacks, and three pass deflections in 12 games and zero starts. His 9.5 sacks led the team and set a franchise record for most sacks by a rookie.

==== 2011 ====
During training camp, Dunlap competed to be a starting defensive end against Robert Geathers, Frostee Rucker, and Michael Johnson. Defensive coordinator Mike Zimmer named Dunlap the fourth defensive end on the depth chart to start the season, behind Robert Geathers, Michael Johnson, and Frostee Rucker. In Week 2, Dunlap collected a season-high four solo tackles during a 24–22 loss at the Denver Broncos. On October 2, 2011, Dunlap made his first career start in place of Robert Geathers. He finished the Bengals' 23–20 victory against the Buffalo Bills with two combined tackles and a pass deflection. On November 6, 2011, he made three combined tackles, a pass deflection, and had a season-high two sacks on Titans' quarterback Matt Hasselbeck in a 24–17 win at the Tennessee Titans. He was inactive for the Bengals' Week 10 loss to the Pittsburgh Steelers due to a hamstring injury. Dunlap aggravated his hamstring injury and was inactive for three more games (Weeks 12–14). In Week 17, Dunlap collected a season-high six combined tackles and was credited with half a sack during a 24–16 loss to the Baltimore Ravens. He finished the season with 23 combined tackles (11 solo), 4.5 sacks, and three pass deflections in 12 games and one start.

The Cincinnati Bengals finished third in the AFC North with a 9–7 record and earned a wildcard berth. On January 7, 2012, Dunlap appeared in his first career playoff game and made one tackle during a 31–10 loss at the Houston Texans in the AFC Wildcard Game.

==== 2012 ====
During training camp, Dunlap competed to be a starting defensive end against Michael Johnson, Jamaal Anderson, and Derrick Harvey. Head coach Marvin Lewis named Dunlap the backup defensive end to begin the season, behind Robert Geathers and Michael Johnson. Dunlap sustained a knee injury during the preseason and was unable to play in the first two games of the regular season (Weeks 1–2).

==== 2013 ====
On July 15, 2013, the Cincinnati Bengals signed Dunlap to a five-year, $39.37 million contract extension with $11.70 million guaranteed and a signing bonus of $8 million.

==== 2015 ====
Dunlap had a breakout season in 2015, recording a career best 13.5 sacks and earning his first Pro Bowl. He was ranked 70th on the NFL Top 100 Players of 2016.

==== 2016 ====
In 2016, he started all 16 games, recording 49 tackles, eight sacks, three forced fumbles, and 15 passes defensed on his way to his second Pro Bowl. His 15 passes defensed was tied for eighth in the league and were the most by any non-defensive back.

==== 2017 ====
In Week 8 of the 2017 season, he batted a pass from Colts' quarterback Jacoby Brissett and intercepted it and returned it 16 yards for a touchdown in a 24–23 win, earning AFC Defensive Player of the Week. He finished the season with 46 tackles, 7.5 sacks, seven passes defensed, and one interception.

==== 2018 ====
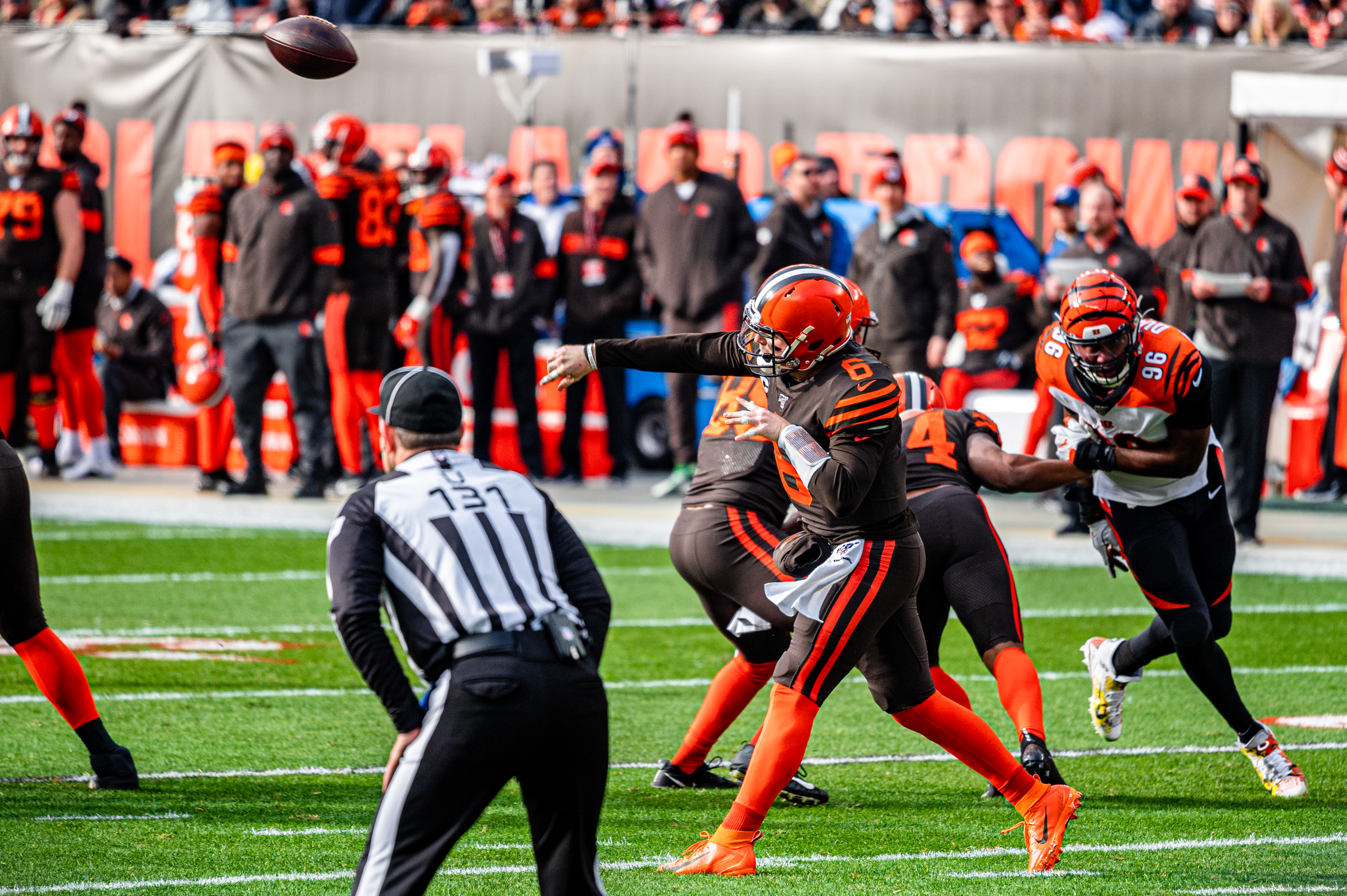
Dunlap (right) playing against the Cleveland Browns in 2019.

On August 28, 2018, Dunlap signed a three-year, $45 million contract extension with the Bengals through the 2021 season.

==== 2019 ====
In week 13 against the New York Jets, Dunlap sacked quarterback Sam Darnold three times as the Bengals won their first game of the season 22–6. He won the AFC Defensive Player of the Week award for his performance. In week 17 against the Cleveland Browns, Dunlap sacked Baker Mayfield 2.5 times during the 33–23 win.

As the 2020 season progressed, Dunlap openly expressed his desire to want out of Cincinnati after losing playing time and questioning his usage by the coaching staff, including posting to his Twitter that he was selling his house in Cincinnati.

=== Seattle Seahawks ===
==== 2020 ====
On October 28, 2020, Dunlap was traded to the Seattle Seahawks for center B. J. Finney and a 2021 seventh-round draft pick. Dunlap made his debut with the Seahawks in Week 9 against the Buffalo Bills. During the game, Dunlap recorded his first sack as a Seahawk on Josh Allen during the 44–34 loss. In Week 11 against the Arizona Cardinals on Thursday Night Football, Dunlap recorded two sacks on Kyler Murray, including one on fourth down late in the fourth quarter to seal a 28–21 Seahawks' win.

==== 2021 ====
Dunlap was released after the season on March 8, 2021, but re-signed with the team on a two-year contract worth $16.6 million on March 30, 2021.

In the Seahawks week 13 game against the San Francisco 49ers, Dunlap recorded the first safety of his career.

On March 18, 2022, Dunlap was released by the Seahawks.

=== Kansas City Chiefs ===
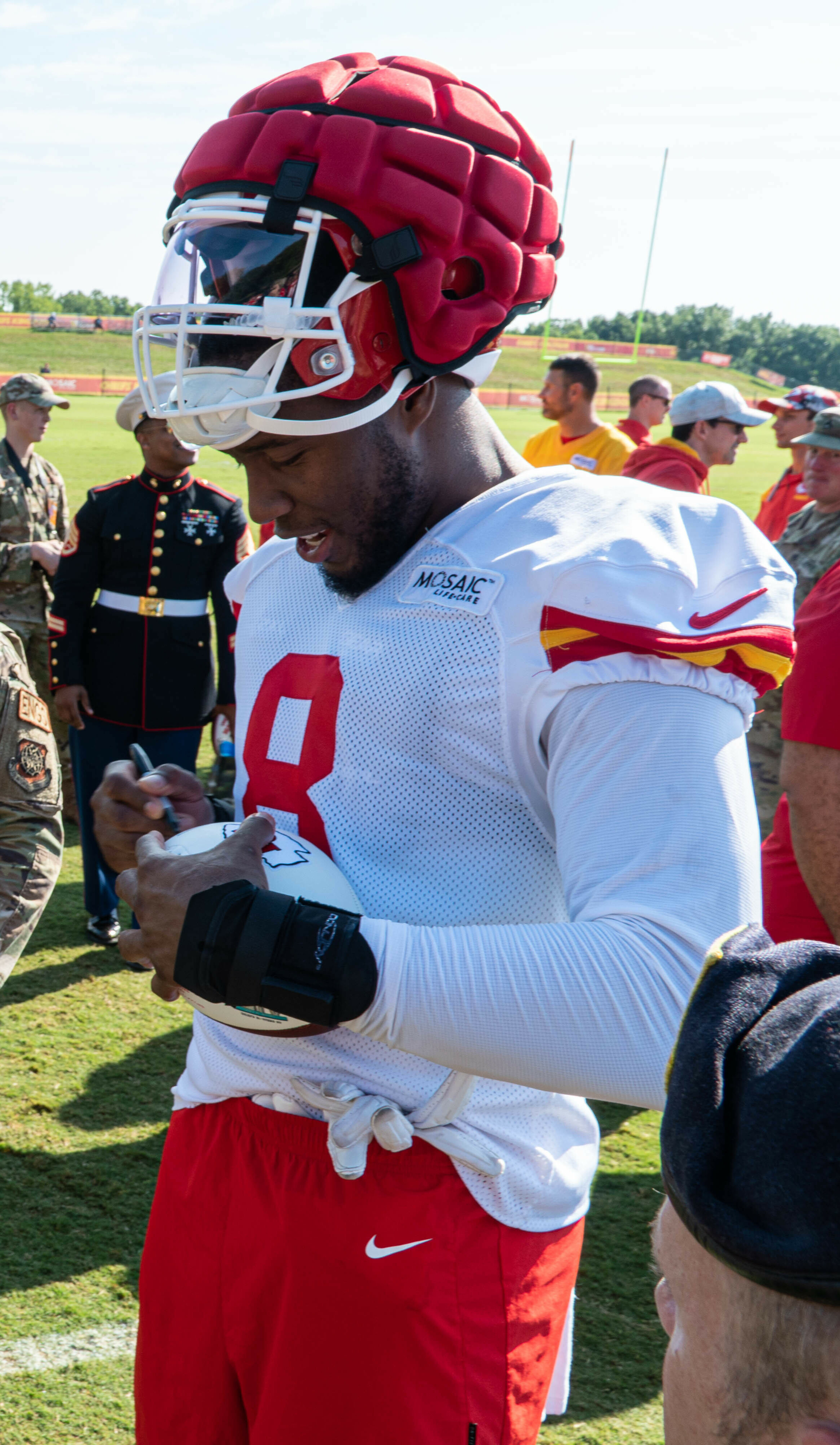
Dunlap in 2022

Dunlap signed with the Kansas City Chiefs on July 28, 2022. Dunlap helped the Chiefs defeat the Cincinnati Bengals, his former team, 23–20 in the AFC Championship Game. On February 12, 2023, they defeated the Philadelphia Eagles 38–35 to win Super Bowl LVII.

== NFL career statistics ==
Legend
	Won the Super Bowl
**Bold**	Career high

Year	Team	Games		Tackles				Fumbles				Interceptions					
Year	Team	GP	GS	Cmb	Solo	Ast	Sck	FF	FR	Yds	TD	Int	Yds	Avg	Lng	TD	PD
2010	CIN	12	0	24	19	5	9.5	0	1	0	0	0	0	0.0	0	0	3
2011	CIN	12	1	23	11	12	4.5	0	1	35	**1**	0	0	0.0	0	0	3
2012	CIN	14	1	41	34	7	6.0	**4**	**3**	2	0	**1**	14	14.0	14	**1**	3
2013	CIN	16	15	58	39	19	7.5	**4**	1	**42**	0	0	0	0.0	0	0	5
2014	CIN	16	16	**66**	**40**	**26**	8.0	2	1	0	0	0	0	0.0	0	0	5
2015	CIN	16	16	55	37	18	**13.5**	2	1	21	0	0	0	0.0	0	0	1
2016	CIN	16	16	49	30	19	8.0	3	0	0	0	0	0	0.0	0	0	**15**
2017	CIN	16	16	46	35	11	7.5	1	0	0	0	**1**	**16**	**16.0**	**16**	**1**	7
2018	CIN	16	16	47	31	16	8.0	2	1	0	0	0	0	0.0	0	0	8
2019	CIN	14	14	63	39	24	9.0	2	0	0	0	0	0	0.0	0	0	8
2020	CIN	7	4	18	13	5	1.0	0	0	0	0	0	0	0.0	0	0	2
2020	SEA	8	6	14	7	7	6.5	0	0	0	0	0	0	0.0	0	0	2
2021	SEA	17	2	34	24	11	8.5	1	0	0	0	0	0	0.0	0	0	7
2022	KC	17	2	39	25	14	4.0	1	0	0	0	0	0	0.0	0	0	8
Career		197	125	578	384	194	100.0	22	9	100	1	2	30	15.0	16	2	77

== Personal life ==
Dunlap graduated from the University of Florida with a Bachelor of Science in Family, Youth and Community Sciences finishing his degree online. In May 2016, Dunlap graduated from the University of Miami with a Master of Business Administration.

== See also ==
- List of Florida Gators football All-Americans
- List of Florida Gators in the NFL draft
