= Old White Meeting House Ruins and Cemetery =

Archaeological site in South Carolina, United States

- U.S. National Register of Historic Places
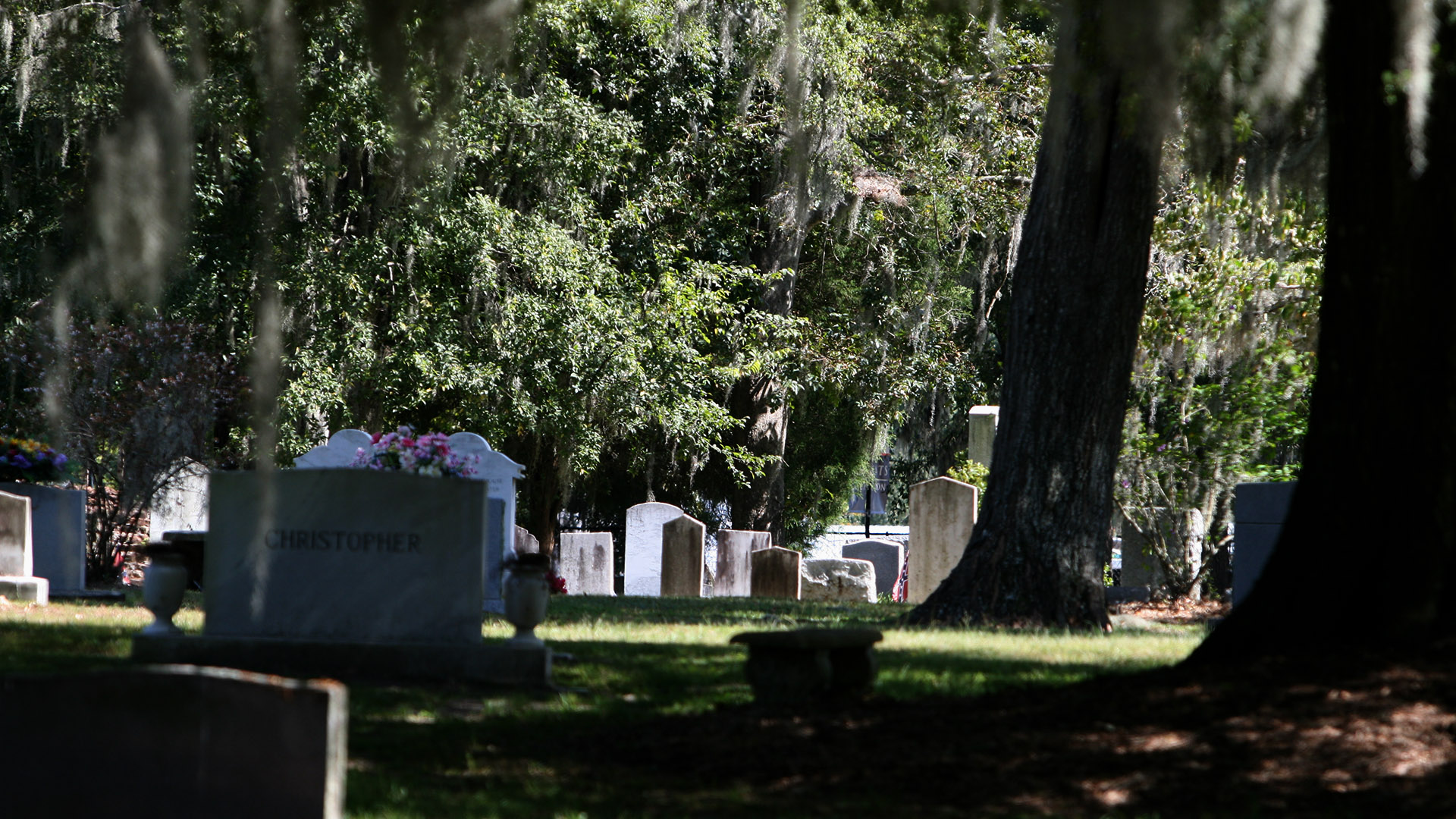

- Location within South Carolina Location within the United States
- Location: South Carolina Highway 642, 0.5 miles southeast of South Carolina Highway 165, near Summerville, South Carolina
- Coordinates: 32°57′56″N 80°11′41″W
- Area: 5.8 acres (2.3 ha)
- Built: 1700
- NRHP reference No.: 97000445
- Added to NRHP: February 8, 2005

Old White Meeting House Ruins and Cemetery is a historic site near Summerville, Dorchester County, South Carolina. The meeting house was built about 1700, burned during the American Revolution in 1781, rebuilt in 1794, then reduced to ruins by the Charleston earthquake of 1886. The extant ruins include portions of each corner – the largest approximately 9’ high – and significant remnants of the foundation of walls. Also on the property is a contributing cemetery.

The site was added to the National Register of Historic Places in 2005.
