= Summerville Historic District (Summerville, South Carolina) =

Historic district in South Carolina, United States

- U.S. National Register of Historic Places
- U.S. Historic district
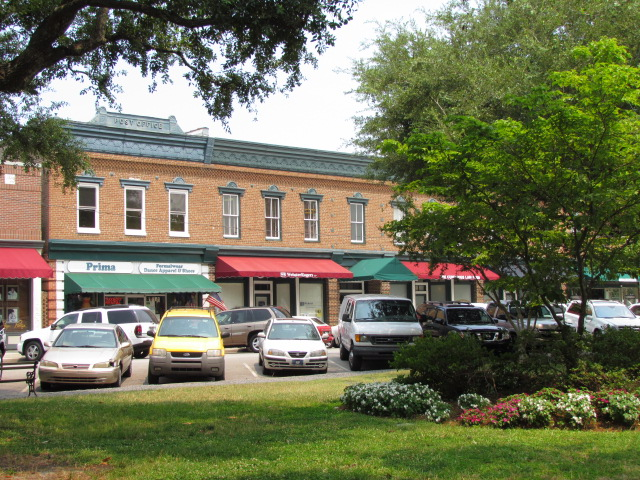

- Location within South Carolina Location within the United States
- Location: Roughly bounded by S. Railroad Ave., Magnolia, Main Sts. and town boundary, Summerville, South Carolina
- Coordinates: 33°00′53″N 80°10′59″W
- Area: 607 acres (246 ha)
- Architectural style: Stick/eastlake, Queen Anne, Shingle Style
- NRHP reference No.: 76001701
- Added to NRHP: May 19, 1976

Summerville Historic District is a national historic district located at Summerville, Dorchester County, South Carolina. The district encompasses 700 contributing buildings in the village of Summerville. About 70 percent of the buildings predate World War I. The buildings include raised cottages, Greek Revival influenced, and Victorian / Queen Anne and other turn of the 20th century structures are found throughout. In addition to residential structures, the district includes churches and commercial buildings—most dating from around 1900. Notable buildings include Tupper's Drug Store, O. J. Sire's Commercial Building, White Gables, Pettigru-Lebby House Gazebo, Summerville Presbyterian Church, Wesley United Methodist Church, and the Squirrel Inn.

It was added to the National Register of Historic Places in 1976.
