= Dorchester School District Two =

School district in Summerville, South Carolina, United States

Address
- 815 S Main Street Summmerville, Dorchester County, South Carolina, 29483; United States

District information
- Type: Public
- Grades: Pre-school – 12
- Superintendent: Charles Daugherty
- Accreditation: Southern Association of Colleges and Schools
- Schools: 26
- Budget: US$ 228,748,486

Students and staff
- Enrollment: 26,522 students
- Faculty: 4,000 employees district-wide

Other information
- Website: www.ddtwo.org

Dorchester School District Two is a school district based in Summerville, South Carolina, United States.

It serves the southeastern portion of Dorchester County, including sections of Summerville and North Charleston.

== Schools ==
=== High schools ===
- Ashley Ridge High School
- Fort Dorchester High School
- Summerville High School

=== Middle schools ===
- Alston Middle School
- DuBose Middle School
- East Edisto Middle School
- Gregg Middle School
- Oakbrook Middle School
- Rollings Middle School of the Arts
- River Oaks Middle School

=== Elementary schools ===
- Alston-Bailey Elementary School
- Beech Hill Elementary School
- Eagle Nest Elementary School
- Flowertown Elementary School
- Fort Dorchester Elementary School
- Knightsville Elementary School
- Newington Elementary School
- Oakbrook Elementary School
- Pye Elementary School
- Sand Hill Elementary School
- Sires Elementary School
- Summerville Elementary School
- William Reeves Elementary School
- Windsor Hill Elementary School
