= Summerville, South Carolina =

- Town
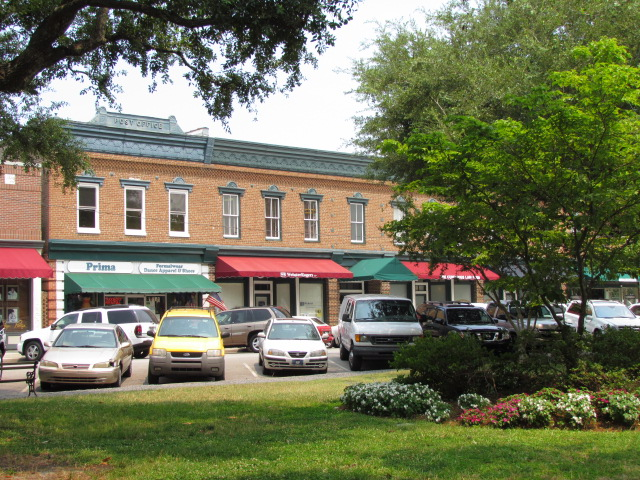
- Downtown Summerville

- Seal
- Nickname: Flowertown
- Mottoes: "The Flower Town in the Pines" "Sacra Pinus Esto" (Latin) (The Pine is Sacred)
- Interactive map of Summerville
- Location in South Carolina Location in the United States
- Coordinates: 32°59′23″N 80°10′30″W
- Country: United States
- State: South Carolina
- Counties: Dorchester, Berkeley, Charleston
- Incorporated: December 17, 1847
- Named for: It being a popular location for summer resorts and houses

Government
  - Type: Council–manager
  - Body: Summerville Town Council
  - Mayor: Russ Touchberry
  - City Council: Dexcter Mack; Tiffany Johnson-Wilson; Matt Halter; Richard G. Waring IV; Kima Garten; Bob Jackson

Area
  - Total: 22.67 sq mi (58.72 km^{2})
  - Land: 22.54 sq mi (58.37 km^{2})
  - Water: 0.14 sq mi (0.35 km^{2})
- Elevation: 43 ft (13 m)

Population (2020)
  - Total: 50,915
  - Density: 2,259/sq mi (872.3/km^{2})
- Time zone: UTC−5 (Eastern (EST))
  - Summer (DST): UTC−4 (EDT)
- ZIP codes: 29483-29486
- Area codes: 843, 854
- FIPS code: 45-70270
- GNIS feature ID: 2406684
- Website: www.summervillesc.gov

Summerville is a town in the U.S. state of South Carolina situated mostly in Dorchester County, with small portions in Berkeley and Charleston Counties. It lies about 5 miles from the Ashley River. Its population was 50,915 at the 2020 census, making it the seventh-most populous city in South Carolina. It is part of the Charleston metropolitan area.

== History ==
The first settlement in Summerville began after the American Revolutionary War; it was called Pineland Village in 1785. Development in the area resulted from plantation owners who resided in the Charleston area and came to Summerville to escape seasonal insects and their attendant swamp fever. The founder, John Micheal Guy, was born in Charleston and decided to establish the town based on the aforementioned reasons.

Summerville became an official town on December 17, 1847. That year, the town passed a law against cutting down trees, the nation's first such law, and a $25 fine ($863.80 in 2025) was issued to anyone who did so without permission. The town's official seal reads "Sacra Pinus Esto (The Pine is Sacred)".

The 1886 Charleston earthquake affected Summerville, which resulted in a fire that reduced many of the buildings in the town square to ruins. During this earthquake, the Old White Meeting House Ruins and Cemetery, located near Summerville, was also destroyed. Today, Summerville is located within the Middleton Place-Summerville seismic zone, which is the most active seismic zone in South Carolina.

In 1899, the International Congress of Physicians (or "Tuberculosis Congress") listed Summerville as one of the world's two best areas for treatment of and recovery from lung and throat disorders, due to its dry and sandy location and the many pine trees that release turpentine derivatives into the air. This notation is credited with aiding Summerville's commercial and residential development.

The former Summerville post office built in 1938 contains a mural, Train Time – Summerville, painted by Bernadine Custer in 1939. Federally commissioned murals were produced from 1934 to 1943 in the U.S. through the Section of Painting and Sculpture, later called the Section of Fine Arts, of the Treasury Department.

In 2019, Dorchester County announced that it was redeveloping 500 N. Main Street, the biggest tract of land in downtown Summerville.

The Ashley River Road, Middleton Place, Colonial Dorchester State Historic Site, Old White Meeting House Ruins and Cemetery, and the Summerville Historic District are listed on the National Register of Historic Places.

== Geography ==
The center of Summerville is in southeastern Dorchester County; the town extends northeast into Berkeley and Charleston Counties. It is bordered to the east by the town of Lincolnville and to the southeast by the city of North Charleston. Summerville's town limits extend south as far as the Ashley River next to Old Fort Dorchester State Historical Park.

U.S. Route 78 passes near the center of Summerville, leading southeast 24 miles (39 km) to downtown Charleston and northwest 29 miles (47 km) to Interstate 95 at St. George. Interstate 26 leads through Summerville's northeast corner, with access from Exit 199, leading southeast to Charleston and northwest 90 miles (140 km) to Columbia.

According to the United States Census Bureau, the town has a total area of 22.67 square miles (58.7 km^{2}), of which 0.14 sq mi (0.36 km^{2}) (5.24%) is covered by water.

=== Climate ===
Summerville has a humid subtropical climate (Köppen: Cfa) with long, hot summers and short, mild winters.

Climate data for Summerville (normals 1991–2020, extremes 1898–present)
Month	Jan	Feb	Mar	Apr	May	Jun	Jul	Aug	Sep	Oct	Nov	Dec	Year
Record high °F (°C)	84 (29)	87 (31)	98 (37)	96 (36)	101 (38)	104 (40)	104 (40)	106 (41)	107 (42)	99 (37)	90 (32)	87 (31)	107 (42)
Mean maximum °F (°C)	75.9 (24.4)	77.8 (25.4)	84.0 (28.9)	87.3 (30.7)	93.2 (34.0)	96.3 (35.7)	97.7 (36.5)	96.6 (35.9)	93.3 (34.1)	87.4 (30.8)	81.4 (27.4)	76.6 (24.8)	98.7 (37.1)
Mean daily maximum °F (°C)	58.2 (14.6)	61.9 (16.6)	68.5 (20.3)	75.6 (24.2)	82.3 (27.9)	87.2 (30.7)	90.1 (32.3)	89.7 (32.1)	84.7 (29.3)	76.6 (24.8)	67.7 (19.8)	61.3 (16.3)	75.3 (24.1)
Daily mean °F (°C)	46.4 (8.0)	49.4 (9.7)	55.4 (13.0)	62.6 (17.0)	70.7 (21.5)	77.2 (25.1)	80.5 (26.9)	80.1 (26.7)	74.8 (23.8)	64.8 (18.2)	54.9 (12.7)	49.3 (9.6)	63.8 (17.7)
Mean daily minimum °F (°C)	34.5 (1.4)	37.0 (2.8)	42.2 (5.7)	49.5 (9.7)	59.1 (15.1)	67.2 (19.6)	70.9 (21.6)	70.4 (21.3)	64.8 (18.2)	53.0 (11.7)	42.2 (5.7)	37.4 (3.0)	52.4 (11.3)
Mean minimum °F (°C)	20.6 (−6.3)	23.1 (−4.9)	28.2 (−2.1)	36.6 (2.6)	46.9 (8.3)	58.7 (14.8)	65.9 (18.8)	64.5 (18.1)	54.0 (12.2)	38.2 (3.4)	28.3 (−2.1)	24.6 (−4.1)	18.6 (−7.4)
Record low °F (°C)	5 (−15)	−5 (−21)	19 (−7)	27 (−3)	33 (1)	45 (7)	56 (13)	55 (13)	40 (4)	26 (−3)	12 (−11)	9 (−13)	−5 (−21)
Average precipitation inches (mm)	3.63 (92)	3.27 (83)	3.89 (99)	3.45 (88)	3.52 (89)	5.60 (142)	6.78 (172)	6.17 (157)	5.88 (149)	4.12 (105)	2.97 (75)	3.42 (87)	52.7 (1,338)
Average precipitation days (≥ 0.1 in)	10.2	8.5	7.3	7.5	7.0	10.3	11.9	13.0	8.9	7.0	7.3	8.9	107.8
Source: NOAA (precipitation days 1981-2010)

== Demographics ==
Historical population
Census	Pop.	Note	%±
1880	1,371		—
1890	2,219		61.9%
1900	2,420		9.1%
1910	2,355		−2.7%
1920	2,550		8.3%
1930	2,579		1.1%
1940	3,023		17.2%
1950	3,312		9.6%
1960	3,633		9.7%
1970	3,839		5.7%
1980	6,492		69.1%
1990	22,519		246.9%
2000	27,752		23.2%
2010	43,392		56.4%
2020	50,915		17.3%
2025 (est.)	53,177	▲	4.4%
U.S. Decennial Census; 2020

=== 2020 census ===
Summerville racial composition (2020)
Race	Num.	Perc.
White (non-Hispanic)	33,259	65.32%
Black or African American (non-Hispanic)	10,460	20.54%
Native American	204	0.4%
Asian	800	1.57%
Pacific Islander	67	0.13%
Other/multiracial	2,942	5.78%
Hispanic or Latino	3,183	6.25%

As of the 2020 census, Summerville had a population of 50,915. The median age was 38.3 years; 23.8% of residents were under 18 and 16.3% were 65 or older. For every 100 females, there were 89.2 males, and for every 100 females 18 and over, there were 85.3 males 18 and over. All of the residents lived in urban areas, while none lived in rural areas.

Of the 20,127 households in Summerville, 33.7% had children under 18 living in them, 47.3% were married-couple households, 15.7% were households with a male householder and no spouse or partner present, and 30.4% were households with a female householder and no spouse or partner present. About 25.8% of all households were made up of individuals, and 10.6% had someone living alone who was 65 or older.

The 21,491 housing units had a 6.3% vacancy rate. The homeowner vacancy rate was 1.4% and the rental vacancy rate was 8.7%.

In 2023, of the 70,270 people in Summerville, about 42,960 were in Dorchester County, 5,405 were in Berkeley County, and 2,550 were in Charleston County.

=== 2010 census ===
Summerville racial composition (2010)
Race	Num.	Perc.
White (non-Hispanic)	30,101	69.37%
Black or African American (non-Hispanic)	9,158	21.11%
Native American	161	0.37%
Asian	647	1.49%
Pacific Islander	38	0.09%
Other/multiracial	1,122	2.59%
Hispanic or Latino	2,165	4.99%

At the 2010 census, 43,392 people were residing in 16,181 households in the town. Summerville's population density was 2,404.7 inhabitants per square mile.

Of the 16,181 households, 38.6% had children under 18 living with them, 48.9% were married couples living together, 15.4% had a female householder with no husband present, and 31.0% were not families. About 25.3% of all households were made up of individuals, and 8.8% had someone living alone who was 65 or older. The average household size was 2.55.

In the town, 27.0% of the population was under 18, and 10.5% was 65 or older. The median age was 34.7 years.

The median income in the town for a household was $54,677. About 11.2% of the population were below the poverty line. The median value of an owner-occupied home was $182,000.

== Culture ==
Starting in 1972, Summerville has supported the Summerville Family YMCA in hosting the annual Flowertown Festival to support health-and-wellness programs at the YMCA. It is South Carolina's largest arts and crafts festival. It is held during the last weekend of March or the first weekend of April in the Summerville Azalea Park. It often coincides with the annual Cooper River Bridge Run held in Charleston the same weekend. During the three days of the Flowertown Festival, Summerville sees about 200,000 visitors. Admission and parking is free to all who attend. No alcohol or pets are permitted at the festival. About 200 artists from around the country are invited and display their works for purchase. Area restaurants are featured in the festival's "Taste" section, where tickets can be purchased to sample their offerings. Children can enjoy the carnival in the Children's Jubilee/Kids Fest section.

In 1925, these flowers led Summerville's Chamber of Commerce to adopt the slogan "Flower Town in the Pines". Summerville also claims the title "The Birthplace of Sweet Tea". A recipe for sweet iced tea published in Texas native Marion Cabell's 1879 cookbook Housekeeping in Old Virginia has been cited as evidence against this claim.

== Government ==
Summerville has a council form of government, with a town council acting as the chief legislative and executive body of the municipality. Day-to-day operations and legislation implementation are delegated to a town administrator hired to assist the town council in its executive functions. The council has seven members - a mayor elected at-large and six other members elected from single-member districts. By tradition, the mayor presides over council meetings and serves as spokesperson for the council. Summerville has had five mayors in the past 15 years: Berlin G. Myers (1972–2011), Bill Collins (2011–2016), Wiley Johnson (2016–2020), Ricky Waring (2020–2024), and Russ Touchberry (2024- ).

=== Fire department ===
The Town of Summerville Fire and Rescue comprises 97 full-time firefighters and 19 volunteers. These firemen operate out of six stations across town and are subdivided into five engine companies and two ladder companies. Also included in the department is the Fire Marshall Office, which comprises a chief fire marshall and two assistants. The department operates on a 24/48 schedule and maintains a Class 1 ISO rating. In 2025, the 2026 budget for the Summerville Fire Department was estimated at $12.8 million. The current fire chief is Brent Melcher.

=== Police department ===
The Town of Summerville Police Department consists of 120 sworn officers and 29 civilian staff members, with 2.33 full-time law enforcement officers per 1,000 residents. The estimated 2026 budget for the Summerville Police Department was $15.4 million. The current chief of police is Doug Wright.

=== EMS and medical centers ===
Emergency medical services (EMS) for the town are provided primarily by Dorchester County EMS. In some cases, these services are provided by both Charleston and Berkley County EMS, due to small parts of the town being in these counties.

While the city of Charleston is the primary medical center for the area, Summerville is home to the Summerville Medical Center and many different Medical University of South Carolina campuses, which serve the town.

== Crime ==
This table shows the service statistics collected by the Summerville Police Department. In 2023, the Summerville Police Department received 94,446 calls for service, resulting in 2,030 arrests.

Reported crimes
Crime	2025	2024	2023	2022	2021	2020	2019	2018	2017	2016	2015	2014	2013
Arson	1	1	0	4	1	1	0	6	5	0	3	0	2
Aggravated assault	25	14	12	20	19	155	30	219	145	136	57	64	36
Burglary	102	74	113	142	128	155	183	264	224	235	235	203	215
Criminal sex. conduct	59	155	52	48	72	97	92	69	43	23	31	21	24
Homicide	0	6	2	5	2	5	5	2	5	4	5	1	0
Larceny	1,528	1,555	1,589	1,832	1,826	1,889	1,925	1,523	1,587	1,594	1,070	1,304	1,191
Motor vehicle theft	171	202	300	270	214	207	187	167	123	109	182	123	93
Robbery	8	15	15	23	18	27	34	46	46	27	31	25	29
Total	1,894	2,022	2,083	2,344	2,280	2,536	2,456	2,296	2,178	2,128	1,614	1,741	1,590

== Education ==
Public education in the portions of Summerville in Dorchester County is administered by Dorchester School District Two, which operates Summerville High School, Ashley Ridge High School, and Fort Dorchester High School. Summerville High School's Memorial Stadium, which has a capacity of around 6,500, is used for American football games.

All areas in Berkeley County are in the Berkeley County School District. All areas in Charleston County are in the Charleston County School District.

Summerville has a public library, a branch of the Dorchester County Library.

Private schools in the area include Pinewood Preparatory School.

== Notable people ==
- Jonathan Amon, soccer player
- Christopher Celiz, army ranger and Medal of Honor recipient
- Jenn Colella, comedian, actress, and singer
- Janet Cone, college athletic director at UNC Asheville
- Chuck Eidson, professional basketball player
- Sam Esmail, film and television producer known for Mr. Robot and Homecoming
- Brett Gardner, professional baseball player
- A. J. Green, professional football player
- Charles Green, known as Angry Grandpa on YouTube
- Shanola Hampton, actress
- Brad Hawkins, actor, martial artist and country music singer
- De'Angelo Henderson, professional football player
- Keith Jennings, professional football player
- Milton Jennings, professional basketball player
- Stanford Jennings, professional football player
- Dro Kenji, rapper and singer
- Annie Virginia McCracken, author
- John McKissick, high school football coach
- Fern Michaels, author
- Johnny Wactor, actor

== Transportation ==
Interstate 26 is a major thoroughfare with four exits in the town: Jedburg Road, Nexton Parkway, US Route 17A, and College Park Road.

US 78, US 176, SC 165, SC 642, and SC 61 all pass through the town.

For recreational aviation, there is the Summerville Airport.

== See also ==
- List of municipalities in South Carolina
