= Fort Dorchester High School =

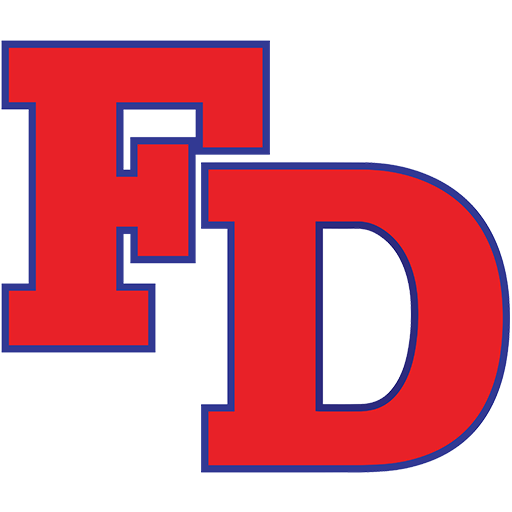

Location
- 8500 Patriot Blvd. North Charleston, South Carolina 29420; United States; 32°55′35″N 80°6′40″W

Information
- Type: Public high school
- Motto: Pride In Excellence
- Established: 1992 (34 years ago)
- School district: Dorchester School District Two
- Principal: Dr. Mathis Burnette
- Staff: 137.50 (FTE)
- Grades: 9–12
- Enrollment: 2,301 (2023–2024)
- Student to teacher ratio: 16.73
- Campus type: Urban
- Colors: Red, blue, and silver
- Mascot: Patriots
- Rivals: Summerville, Wando, Ashley Ridge, Stratford
- Newspaper: Patriot News
- Yearbook: Patriot Yearbook
- Website: fdhs.ddtwo.org

Fort Dorchester High School is a public high school located in North Charleston, South Carolina, United States. It is one of the three high schools in Dorchester School District Two.

== Athletics ==
Fort Dorchester High School's mascot is the Patriot, and its colors are red, blue, and silver.

Fort Dorchester competes as a 5A school in Region 8.

In 2015, the Fort Dorchester football team won the 5A South Carolina State Championship.

== Notable alumni ==
- Jasmine Camacho-Quinn, Olympic gold medalist in 100 meter hurdles at 2020 Summer Olympics
- Carlos Dunlap, NFL defensive end, 2-time Pro Bowl selection
- Karl Jacobs, Twitch streamer and YouTuber
- Byron Maxwell, NFL cornerback, Super Bowl XLVIII champion with the Seattle Seahawks
- Robert Quinn, NFL defensive end, 3-time Pro Bowl selection
- John Simpson, NFL offensive guard
