= 1997 Pittsburgh Steelers season =

Sports season

- Owner: The Rooney Family
- General manager: Tom Donahoe
- Head coach: Bill Cowher
- Offensive coordinator: Chan Gailey
- Defensive coordinator: Jim Haslett
- Home stadium: Three Rivers Stadium

Results
- Record: 11–5
- Division place: 1st AFC Central
- Playoffs: Won Divisional Playoffs (vs. Patriots) 7–6; Lost AFC Championship (vs. Broncos) 21–24
- All-Pros: 5: Dermontti Dawson (1st team); Levon Kirkland (1st team); Carnell Lake (1st team); Jerome Bettis (2nd team); Yancey Thigpen (2nd team)
- Pro Bowlers: 6: RB Jerome Bettis; C Dermontti Dawson; ILB Levon Kirkland; SS/CB Carnell Lake; NT Joel Steed; WR Yancey Thigpen
- Team MVP: Jerome Bettis
- Team ROY: Chad Scott

The 1997 Pittsburgh Steelers season was the franchise's 65th season as a professional sports franchise and as a member of the National Football League.

This season was considered a transitional year due to many key free agent losses in the offseason, as well as the first season of Kordell Stewart starting at quarterback.

The Steelers finished with an 11–5 record, their fourth consecutive AFC Central top seed, and their sixth straight playoff appearance. In doing so, Steelers head coach Bill Cowher tied Hall of Fame coach Paul Brown with most consecutive playoff appearances to start a head coaching career in the NFL—a record Cowher still co-owns with Brown, as the Steelers missed the playoffs the following season.

The Steelers made 572 rushing attempts in 1997, the most in the 1990s. Their 2,479 total rushing yards were the third-most of the decade by any team.

The Steelers went into the season introducing a new font style numbers on jerseys matching the ones they wear on the helmets and the Steelers logo patch on uniform. This was the only season where the white away jerseys featured the players last names in black letters. It would switch back to gold lettering with black trim the next season.

The Steelers would host the AFC Championship Game for the third time in four years; however, they would ultimately lose to the eventual Super Bowl champion Denver Broncos. That game was the last playoff appearance for the Steelers during the 1990s and they did not return to the postseason until 2001.

== Offseason ==
The Steelers saw many key free-agents leave the team, the biggest being cornerback Rod Woodson, whose ten-year tenure with the team ended due to a dispute over money with the Rooney family. Woodson would sign with the San Francisco 49ers as a result, though the Steelers would see him again in the following four seasons afterward as a member of the rival Baltimore Ravens. Other free-agent losses included Chad Brown, Ernie Mills, Andre Hastings, Deon Figures, and Brentson Buckner, among others. The team did manage to keep its other prized free-agent besides Woodson, locking up Jerome Bettis (who they had acquired in a trade with the St. Louis Rams the year before) with a four-year deal.

The team also had a transition at quarterback. After pushing Bill Cowher play exclusively at quarterback, Kordell Stewart was handed the starting job and dropping his "Slash" role on the team. Stewart would have success with the team this season, but would be inconsistent afterwards.

The team also made some minor changes to the uniforms this season, the first changes since gold pants were adopted as part of the white jerseys in 1972. The jersey numbers, previously having the old-style block numbering, were switched to the rounder style (Futura Condensed) as seen on the helmets. In addition, the Steelers logo was added to the left shoulder and the names became single color (black) fonts on the white away jersey. The names returned to gold on black the following year. The uniforms have remained the same since these changes as of 2007.

=== NFL draft ===
1997 Pittsburgh Steelers draft
Round	Pick	Player	Position	College	Notes
1	24	Chad Scott	Cornerback	Maryland	
2	53	Will Blackwell	Wide receiver	San Diego State	
3	82	Paul Wiggins	Tackle	Oregon	
3	91	Mike Vrabel *	Linebacker	Ohio State	
5	154	George Jones	Running back	San Diego State	
6	186	Daryl Porter	Safety	Boston College	
6	199	Rod Manuel	Defensive end	Oklahoma	
7	223	Mike Adams	Wide receiver	Texas	
Made roster * Made at least one Pro Bowl during career

== Personnel ==
=== Coaches / Staff ===
1997 Pittsburgh Steelers staff
Front office: President – Daniel M. Rooney; Vice president – John R. McGinley; Vice president – Arthur J. Rooney, Jr.; Vice president and general counsel – Arthur J. Rooney II; Administration advisor – Chuck Noll; Director of business – Mark Hart; Business coordinator – Dan Ferens; Accounts coordinator – Jim Ellenberger; Office/ticket manager – Geraldine Glenn; Marketing coordinator – Mark Fuhrman; Merchandising manager – Tim Carey; Assistant marketing manager – Lynne Molyneaux; Media relations coordinator – Rob Boulware; Assistant/community relations – Ron Miller; Football operations; Director of football operations – Tom Donahoe; Personnel staff; College personnel coordinator – Tom Modrak; Pro personnel coordinator – Charles Bailey; College scout – Bob Lane; College scout – Max McCartney; College scout – Phil Kreidler; BLESTO College Scout – Mark Gorscak; Head coaches: Head coach – Bill Cowher; Offensive coaches: Offensive coordinator – Chan Gailey; Running backs – Dick Hoak; Wide receivers – David Culley; Tight ends – Mike Mularkey; Offensive line – Kent Stephenson	Defensive coaches: Defensive coordinator – Jim Haslett; Defensive line – John Mitchell; Linebackers – Mike Archer; Defensive backs – Tim Lewis; Special teams coaches: Special teams – Ron Zook; Administrative assistant – Lou Spanos; Strength and conditioning: Conditioning coordinator – Chet Fuhrman; Medical staff; Ophthalmologist – Dr. Randy Beatty; Physician, orthopedic – Dr. James P. Bradley; Neurological surgery consultant – Dr. Joseph Maroon; Physician, M.D. – Dr. Richard Rydze; Physician, consultant – Dr. Abraham J. Twerski; Physician, M.D. – Dr. Anthony P. Yates; Training staff; Head trainer – John Norwig; Assistant trainer – Rick Burkholder; Equipment manager – Rodgers Freyvogel; Field manager – Rich Baker; Field/equipment assistant – Paul Gallagher; Equipment consultant – Tony Parisi; Video coordinator – Bob McCartney; Video assistant – Pat Dolan; Player development coordinator – Anthony Griggs; Photographers – Mike Fabus, Bill Amatucci, Michael Drazdzinski

Notable additions include Paul Wiggins and Mike Vrabel.

=== Roster ===
1997 Pittsburgh Steelers roster
Quarterbacks (QB): 11 Mike Quinn; 10 Kordell Stewart; 18 Mike Tomczak; Running backs (RB): 36 Jerome Bettis; 43 George Jones; 34 Tim Lester FB; 25 Fred McAfee; 38 Jon Witman FB; Wide receivers (WR): 89 Will Blackwell; 19 Andre Coleman KR; 88 Courtney Hawkins; 83 Corey Holliday; 81 Charles Johnson; 17 Curtis Marsh; 82 Yancey Thigpen; Tight ends (TE): 84 Kirk Botkin LS; 87 Mark Bruener; 46 Troy Sadowski	Offensive linemen (OL): 63 Dermontti Dawson C; 65 John Jackson T; 62 Tom Myslinski G; 68 Brenden Stai G; 67 Jamain Stephens T; 73 Justin Strzelczyk T; 66 Jim Sweeney C; 79 Paul Wiggins T; 77 Will Wolford G; Defensive linemen (DL): 98 Oliver Gibson NT; 74 Nolan Harrison DE; 76 Kevin Henry DE; 97 Rod Manuel DE; 71 Orpheus Roye DE; 93 Joel Steed NT	Linebackers (LB): 53 Steve Conley OLB; 51 Carlos Emmons OLB; 92 Jason Gildon OLB; 50 Earl Holmes ILB; 54 Donta Jones OLB; 99 Levon Kirkland ILB; 95 Greg Lloyd OLB; 55 Jerry Olsavsky ILB; 96 Mike Vrabel OLB; Defensive backs (DB): 40 Myron Bell SS; 27 J. B. Brown CB; 41 Lethon Flowers FS; 29 Randy Fuller CB; 37 Carnell Lake CB/S; 24 Chris Oldham CB; 39 Darren Perry FS; 30 Chad Scott CB; 21 Donnell Woolford CB; Special teams (ST): 9 Norm Johnson K; 4 Josh Miller P	Practice squad: 22 DeAuntae Brown CB; 57 John Fiala LB; 42 David McCann RB; Reserve: 86 Mike Adams WR (IR); 80 Jahine Arnold WR (IR); 14 Henry Bailey WR (IR); 85 Mitch Lyons TE (IR); Rookies in italics 53 active, 4 reserve, 3 practice squad

== Preseason ==
=== Schedule ===
Week	Date	Opponent	Result	Record	Venue
1	July 27	vs. Chicago Bears	W 30–17	1–0	(Republic of Ireland) Croke Park (Dublin, Ireland)
2	August 2	at Kansas City Chiefs	W 28–14	2–0	Arrowhead Stadium
3	August 11	Philadelphia Eagles	W 42–26	3–0	Three Rivers Stadium
4	August 17	Detroit Lions	W 28–20	4–0	Three Rivers Stadium
5	August 22	at Carolina Panthers	W 27–19	5–0	Ericsson Stadium

== Regular season ==
=== Schedule ===
Week	Date	Opponent	Result	Record	Venue
1	August 31	Dallas Cowboys	**L** 7–37	0–1	Three Rivers Stadium
2	September 7	Washington Redskins	**W** 14–13	1–1	Three Rivers Stadium
3	Bye				
4	September 22	at **Jacksonville Jaguars**	**L** 21–30	1–2	Alltel Stadium
5	September 28	**Tennessee Oilers**	**W** 37–24	2–2	Three Rivers Stadium
6	October 5	at **Baltimore Ravens**	**W** 42–34	3–2	Memorial Stadium
7	October 12	Indianapolis Colts	**W** 24–22	4–2	Three Rivers Stadium
8	October 19	at **Cincinnati Bengals**	**W** 26–10	5–2	Cinergy Field
9	October 26	**Jacksonville Jaguars**	**W** 23–17 (OT)	6–2	Three Rivers Stadium
10	November 3	at Kansas City Chiefs	**L** 10–13	6–3	Arrowhead Stadium
11	November 9	**Baltimore Ravens**	**W** 37-0	7-3	Three Rivers Stadium
12	November 16	**Cincinnati Bengals**	**W** 20–3	8–3	Three Rivers Stadium
13	November 23	at Philadelphia Eagles	**L** 20–23	8–4	Veterans Stadium
14	November 30	at Arizona Cardinals	**W** 26–20 (OT)	9–4	Sun Devil Stadium
15	December 7	Denver Broncos	**W** 35–24	10–4	Three Rivers Stadium
16	December 13	at New England Patriots	**W** 24–21 (OT)	11–4	Foxboro Stadium
17	December 21	at **Tennessee Oilers**	**L** 6–16	11–5	Liberty Bowl Memorial Stadium
Note: Intra-division opponents are in **bold** text.

=== Game summaries ===
==== Week 1 (Sunday August 31, 1997): vs. Dallas Cowboys ====
	1	2	3	4	Total
**Cowboys**	0	17	17	3	**37**
Steelers	0	0	0	7	**7**

at Three Rivers Stadium, Pittsburgh, Pennsylvania

- Game time: 1:00 pm EDT
- Game weather: 74 °F (23 °C) (Partly Sunny)
- Game attendance: 60,396
- Referee: Jerry Markbreit
- TV announcers: (FOX) Pat Summerall (play by play), John Madden (color commentator), Pam Oliver (sideline reporter)

Scoring drives:

- Dallas – Miller 12 pass from Aikman (Cunningham kick)
- Dallas – Irvin 42 pass from Aikman (Cunningham kick)
- Dallas – FG Cunningham 52
- Dallas – Irvin 15 pass from Aikman (Cunningham kick)
- Dallas – FG Cunningham 24
- Dallas – Johnston 13 pass from Aikman (Cunningham kick)
- Dallas – FG Cunningham 28
- Pittsburgh – Bruener 4 pass from Stewart (N. Johnson kick)

==== Week 2 (Sunday September 7, 1997): vs. Washington Redskins ====
	1	2	3	4	Total
Redskins	0	3	10	0	**13**
**Steelers**	7	0	0	7	**14**

at Three Rivers Stadium, Pittsburgh, Pennsylvania

- Game time: 1:00 pm EDT
- Game weather: 74 °F (23 °C) (Partly Sunny)
- Game attendance: 58,059
- Referee: Ron Blum
- TV announcers: (FOX) Dick Stockton (play by play), Matt Millen (color commentator), Pam Oliver (sideline reporter)

Scoring drives:

- Pittsburgh – Stewart 1 run (N. Johnson kick)
- Washington – FG Blanton 37
- Washington – Mitchell 97 kickoff return (Blanton kick)
- Washington – FG Blanton 28
- Pittsburgh – Bettis 1 run (N. Johnson kick)

==== Week 4 (Monday September 22, 1997): at Jacksonville Jaguars ====
	1	2	3	4	Total
Steelers	7	0	7	7	**21**
**Jaguars**	7	10	3	10	**30**

at Alltel Stadium, Jacksonville, Florida

- Game time: 9:00 pm EDT
- Game weather:
- Game attendance: 73,016
- Referee: Gerry Austin
- TV announcers: (ABC) Al Michaels (play by play), Frank Gifford & Dan Dierdorf (color commentators), Lynn Swann (sideline reporter)

Scoring drives:

- Jacksonville – Means 1 run (Hollis kick)
- Pittsburgh – Stewart 6 run (N. Johnson kick)
- Jacksonville – Smith 11 pass from Brunell (Hollis kick)
- Jacksonville – FG Hollis 20
- Pittsburgh – Thigpen 4 pass from Stewart (N. Johnson kick)
- Jacksonville – FG Hollis 45
- Pittsburgh – Bruener 1 pass from Stewart (N. Johnson kick)
- Jacksonville – FG Hollis 27
- Jacksonville – Hudson 58 blocked field goal return (Hollis kick)

==== Week 5 (Sunday September 28, 1997): vs. Tennessee Oilers ====
	1	2	3	4	Total
Oilers	0	6	3	15	**24**
**Steelers**	10	21	3	3	**37**

at Three Rivers Stadium, Pittsburgh, Pennsylvania

- Game time: 1:00 pm EDT
- Game weather: 67 °F (19 °C) (Cloudy)
- Game attendance: 57,507
- Referee: Bernie Kukar
- TV announcers: (NBC) Jim Donovan (play by play), Beasley Reece (color commentator)

Scoring drives:

- Pittsburgh – Stewart 7 run (N. Johnson kick)
- Pittsburgh – FG Johnson 48
- Pittsburgh – Gildon 12 fumble return (N. Johnson kick)
- Tennessee – FG Del Greco 37
- Pittsburgh – Bruener 18 pass from Stewart (N. Johnson kick)
- Pittsburgh – Stewart 2 run (N. Johnson kick)
- Tennessee – FG Del Greco 47
- Tennessee – FG Del Greco 26
- Pittsburgh – FG N. Johnson 25
- Pittsburgh – FG N. Johnson 44
- Tennessee – Wycheck 10 pass from McNair (Wycheck pass from McNair)
- Tennessee – Davis 11 pass from McNair (Del Greco kick)

==== Week 6 (Sunday October 5, 1997): at Baltimore Ravens ====
	1	2	3	4	Total
**Steelers**	0	7	14	21	**42**
Ravens	14	10	0	10	**34**

at Memorial Stadium, Baltimore, Maryland

- Game time: 1:00 pm EDT
- Game weather:
- Game attendance: 64,421
- Referee: Bill Carollo
- TV announcers: (NBC) Tom Hammond (play by play), Jim Kelly (color commentator)

Scoring drives:

- Baltimore – Green 22 pass from Testaverde (Stover kick)
- Baltimore – Morris 1 run (Stover kick)
- Baltimore – Kinchen 24 pass from Testaverde (Stover kick)
- Pittsburgh – Stewart 1 run (N. Johnson kick)
- Baltimore – FG Stover 34
- Pittsburgh – Blackwell 97 kickoff return (N. Johnson kick)
- Pittsburgh – C. Johnson 8 pass from Stewart (N. Johnson kick)
- Pittsburgh – Bruener 4 pass from Stewart (N. Johnson kick)
- Pittsburgh – C. Johnson 17 pass from Stewart (N. Johnson kick)
- Baltimore – Alexander 10 pass from Testaverde (Byner pass from Testaverde)
- Pittsburgh – Stewart 74 run (N. Johnson kick)
- Baltimore – Safety, Miller ran out of end zone

==== Week 7 (Sunday October 12, 1997): vs. Indianapolis Colts ====
	1	2	3	4	Total
Colts	10	0	3	9	**22**
**Steelers**	0	17	7	0	**24**

at Three Rivers Stadium, Pittsburgh, Pennsylvania

- Game time: 8:00 pm EDT
- Game weather: 66 °F (19 °C) (Clear)
- Game attendance: 57,925
- Referee: Tom White
- TV announcers: (TNT) Verne Lundquist (play by play), Pat Haden & Mark May (color commentators), Craig Sager (sideline reporter)

Scoring drives:

- Indianapolis – Harrison 18 pass from Harbaugh (Blanchard kick)
- Indianapolis – FG Blanchard 37
- Pittsburgh – FG N. Johnson 23
- Pittsburgh – Bettis 7 run (N. Johnson kick)
- Pittsburgh – Lake 38 fumble return (N. Johnson kick)
- Indianapolis – FG Blanchard 27
- Pittsburgh – Hawkins 28 pass from Tomczak (N. Johnson kick)
- Indianapolis – FG Blanchard 35
- Indianapolis – Stablein 5 pass from Harbaugh (pass failed)

==== Week 8 (Sunday October 19, 1997): at Cincinnati Bengals ====
	1	2	3	4	Total
**Steelers**	0	13	7	6	**26**
Bengals	7	0	3	0	**10**

at Cinergy Field, Cincinnati

- Game time: 4:00 pm EDT
- Game weather:
- Game attendance: 60,020
- Referee: Phil Luckett
- TV announcers: (NBC) Dan Hicks (play by play), Bob Trumpy & Jim Kelly (color commentators)

Scoring drives:

- Cincinnati – Carter 6 run (Pelfrey kick)
- Pittsburgh – Jones 11 pass from Stewart (pass failed)
- PIttsburgh – Bettis 1 run (N. Johnson kick)
- Pittsburgh – Thigpen 11 pass from Stewart (N. Johnson kick)
- Cincinnati – FG Pelfrey 33
- Pittsburgh – FG N. Johnson 43
- Pittsburgh – FG N. Johnson 32

==== Week 9 (Sunday October 26, 1997): vs. Jacksonville Jaguars ====
	1	2	3	4	OT	Total
Jaguars	0	10	0	7	0	**17**
**Steelers**	0	0	7	10	6	**23**

at Three Rivers Stadium, Pittsburgh, Pennsylvania

- Game time: 4:00 pm EST
- Game weather: 48 °F (9 °C) (Light Rain)
- Game attendance: 57,011
- Referee: Gary Lane
- TV announcers: (NBC) Dick Enberg (play by play), Phil Simms & Paul Maguire (color commentators)

Scoring drives:

- Jacksonville – Jackson 8 pass from Brunell (Hollis kick)
- Jacksonville – FG Hollis 20
- Pittsburgh – Hawkins 28 pass from Stewart (N. Johnson kick)
- Pittsburgh – Stewart 1 run (N. Johnson kick)
- Jacksonville – Mitchell 3 pass from Brunell (Hollis kick)
- Pittsburgh – FG N. Johnson 19
- Pittsburgh – Bettis 17 pass from Stewart

==== Week 10 (Monday November 3, 1997): at Kansas City Chiefs ====
	1	2	3	4	Total
Steelers	10	0	0	0	**10**
**Chiefs**	0	13	0	0	**13**

at Arrowhead Stadium, Kansas City, Missouri

- Game time: 9:00 pm EST
- Game weather:
- Game attendance: 78,301
- Referee: Ed Hochuli
- TV announcers: (ABC) Al Michaels (play by play), Frank Gifford & Dan Dierdorf (color commentators), Lynn Swann (sideline reporter)

Scoring drives:

- Pittsburgh – Hawkins 44 pass from Stewart (N. Johnson kick)
- Pittsburgh – FG N. Johnson 27
- Kansas City – FG Stoyanovich 35
- Kansas City – FG Stoyanovich 44
- Kansas City – Hughes 14 pass from Allen (Stoyanovich kick)

==== Week 11 (Sunday November 9, 1997): vs. Baltimore Ravens ====
	1	2	3	4	Total
Ravens	0	0	0	0	**0**
**Steelers**	10	10	10	7	**37**

at Three Rivers Stadium, Pittsburgh, Pennsylvania

- Game time: 8:00 pm EST
- Game weather: 44 °F (7 °C) (Cloudy)
- Game attendance: 56,669
- Referee: Gary Lane
- TV announcers: (ESPN) Mike Patrick (play by play), Joe Theismann (color commentator), Ron Jaworski (sideline reporter)

Scoring drives:

- Pittsburgh – Bettis 1 run (N. Johnson kick)
- Pittsburgh – FG N. Johnson 52
- Pittsburgh – Stewart 1 run (N. Johnson kick)
- Pittsburgh – FG N. Johnson 22
- Pittsburgh – FG N. Johnson 39
- Pittsburgh – Thigpen 52 pass from Stewart (N. Johnson kick)
- Pittsburgh – Jones 1 run (N. Johnson kick)

==== Week 12 (Sunday November 16, 1997): vs. Cincinnati Bengals ====
	1	2	3	4	Total
Bengals	0	0	3	0	**3**
**Steelers**	3	3	7	7	**20**

at Three Rivers Stadium, Pittsburgh, Pennsylvania

- Game time: 1:00 pm EST
- Game weather: 30 °F (−1 °C) (Light Snow)
- Game attendance: 55,226
- Referee: Johnny Grier
- TV announcers: (NBC) Dan Hicks (play by play), Jim Kelly (color commentator)

Scoring drives:

- Pittsburgh – FG N. Johnson 34
- Pittsburgh – FG N. Johnson 25
- Pittsburgh – Thigpen 20 pass from Stewart (N. Johnson kick)
- Cincinnati – FG Pelfrey 25
- Pittsburgh – Bruener 5 pass from Stewart (N. Johnson kick)

==== Week 13 (Sunday November 23, 1997): at Philadelphia Eagles ====
	1	2	3	4	Total
Steelers	3	3	7	7	**20**
**Eagles**	14	3	3	3	**23**

at Veterans Stadium, Philadelphia

- Game time: 1:00 pm EST
- Game weather:
- Game attendance: 67,166
- Referee: Jerry Markbreit
- TV announcers: (NBC) Don Criqui (play by play), Jim Mora (color commentator)

Scoring drives:

- Philadelphia – Dunn 31 pass from Hoying (Boniol kick)
- Philadelphia – Fryar 8 pass from Hoying (Boniol kick)
- Pittsburgh – FG N. Johnson 46
- Pittsburgh – FG N. Johnson 40
- Philadelphia – FG Boniol 23
- Philadelphia – FG Boniol 35
- Pittsburgh – Bettis 19 pass from Stewart (N. Johnson kick)
- Philadelphia – FG Boniol 25
- Pittsburgh – Blackwell 30 pass from Stewart (N. Johnson kick)

With their 6th loss in Philadelphia since 1965 the Steelers dropped to 8-4.

==== Week 14 (Sunday November 30, 1997): at Arizona Cardinals ====
Week 14: Pittsburgh Steelers at Arizona Cardinals – Game summary

Quarter	1	2	3	4	OT	Total
Steelers (9–4)	7	3	7	3	6	**26**
Cardinals (3–10)	0	3	14	3	0	**20**

at Sun Devil Stadium • Tempe, Arizona

- Date: November 30, 1997
- Game time: 4:00 p.m. EST
- Game weather: Cloudy; 56 °F (13 °C), relative humidity 53%, wind 5 miles per hour (8.0 km/h; 4.3 kn)
- Game attendance: 66,341
- Referee: Bob McElwee
- TV announcers (NBC): Dan Hicks (play-by-play) and Jim Kelly (color commentator)

Team	Category	Player	Statistics
PIT	Passing	Kordell Stewart	18/35, 179 YDS
PIT	Rushing	Jerome Bettis	36 CAR, 42 YDS, 3 TDs
PIT	Receiving	Yancey Thigpen; Charles Johnson	5 REC, 78 YDS; 5 REC, 41 YDS
ARI	Passing	Jake Plummer	15/26, 270 YDS, 2 TDs
ARI	Rushing	Leeland McElroy	9 CAR, 33 YDS
ARI	Receiving	Rob Moore	8 REC, 188 YDS

Scoring summary

Quarter	Time	Drive			Team	Scoring information	Score	
Quarter	Time	Plays	Yards	TOP	Team	Scoring information	PIT	ARI
1	6:47	13	67	7:12	Steelers	Bettis 2-yard touchdown run, N. Johnson kick good	7	0
2	6:26	8	57	4:00	Cardinals	32-yard field goal by Nedney	7	3
2	1:13	12	55	5:13	Steelers	32-yard field goal by N. Johnson	10	3
3	10:46	6	65	3:01	Cardinals	Sanders 3-yard touchdown reception from Plummer, Nedney kick good	10	10
3	4:20	12	80	6:26	Steelers	Bettis 7-yard touchdown run, N. Johnson kick good	17	10
3	1:00	7	70	3:20	Cardinals	Sanders 11-yard touchdown reception from Gedney, Nedney kick good	17	17
4	9:12	14	53	6:48	Steelers	39-yard field goal by N. Johnson	20	17
4	4:20	8	58	4:52	Cardinals	19-yard field goal by Nedney	20	20
OT	9:26	5	52	2:51	Steelers	Bettis 10-yard touchdown run	26	20
"TOP" = time of possession. For other American football terms, see Glossary of American football.							26	20

- Point spread: Steelers –5½
- Over/under: 38.0 **(over)**
- Time of game: 3 hours, 11 minutes

Steelers	Game statistics	Cardinals
25	First downs	18
44–177	Rushes–yards	17–48
179	Passing yards	296
18–35–0	Passes	16–27–0
2–14	Sacked–yards	10–53
165	Net passing yards	243
342	Total yards	291
131	Return yards	102
5–46.8	Punts	6–44.7
0–0	Fumbles–lost	0–0
0	Turnovers	0
4–20	Penalties–yards	4–30
8–17	Third Down Conversion	2–11
1–1	Fourth Down Conversion	0–0
39:22	Time of possession	26:12

Starting Lineups

Position	Starting Lineups at Arizona
**Offense**
QB	Kordell Stewart
RB	Jerome Bettis
FB	Tim Lester
WR	Yancey Thigpen
WR	Charles Johnson
TE	Mark Bruener
LT	John Jackson
LG	Will Wolford
C	Dermontti Dawson
RG	Brenden Stai
RT	Justin Strzelczyk
**Defense**
LDE	Nolan Harrison
NT	Joel Steed
RDE	Kevin Henry
LOLB	Jason Gildon
LILB	Levon Kirkland
RILB	Earl Holmes
ROLB	Donta Jones
LCB	Donnell Woolford
RCB	Chad Scott
SS	Carnell Lake
FS	Darren Perry

Individual stats

Steelers Passing
	C/ATT^{1}	Yds	TD	INT	Sk	Yds	LG^{3}	Rate
Stewart	18/35	179	0	9	2	14	22	66.2

Steelers Rushing
	Car^{2}	Yds	TD	LG^{3}
Bettis	36	142	3	14
Stewart	6	27	0	12
Hawkins	1	6	0	6
Jones	1	2	0	2

Steelers Receiving
	Rec^{4}	Yds	TD	LG^{3}
Thigpen	5	78	0	22
C. Johnson	5	41	0	10
Bettis	2	19	0	14
Bruener	2	15	0	8
Blackwell	2	5	0	3
Hawkins	1	15	0	15
Jones	1	6	0	6

Steelers Kicking
	FGM–FGA	XPM–XPA
N. Johnson	2–2	2–2

Steelers Punting
	Pnt	Yds	Y/P	Lng	Blck
Miller	5	234	46.8	56	

Steelers Kick Returns
	Ret	Yds	Y/Rt	TD	Lng
Coleman	2	51	25.5	0	0
Blackwell	2	46	23.0	0	0

Steelers Punt Returns
	Ret	Yds	Y/Rt	TD	Lng
Blackwell	3	25	8.3	0	0
Hawkins	1	9	9.0	0	0

Steelers Sacks
	Sacks
Lake	3.0
Herny	1.5
Gildon	1.0
Harrison	1.0
Holmes	1.0
Kirkland	1.0
Oldham	1.0
Vrabel	0.5

Steelers Tackles
	Comb	Solp	Ast
Kirkland	9	6	3
Scott	6	5	1
Gildon	5	5	0
Holmes	4	4	0
Lake	4	4	0
Perry	4	4	0
Woolford	4	4	0
Harrison	3	2	1
Vrabel	3	1	2
Steed	2	2	0
Oldham	1	1	0
Roye	1	1	0

==== Week 15 (Sunday December 7, 1997): vs. Denver Broncos ====
	1	2	3	4	Total
Broncos	14	7	3	0	**24**
**Steelers**	7	14	7	7	**35**

at Three Rivers Stadium, Pittsburgh, Pennsylvania

- Game time: 1:00 pm EST
- Game weather: 36 °F (2 °C) (Flurries)
- Game attendance: 59,739
- Referee: Walt Coleman
- TV announcers: (NBC) Dick Enberg (play by play), Phil Simms & Paul Maguire (color commentators), Jim Gray (sideline reporter)

Scoring drives:

- Denver – R. Smith 37 pass from Elway (Elam kick)
- Pittsburgh – Thigpen 33 pass from Stewart (N. Johnson kick)
- Denver – Davis 3 run (Elam kick)
- Denver – R. Smith 25 pass from Elgay (Elam kick)
- Pittsburgh – Thigpen 69 pass from Stewart (N. Johnson kick)
- Pittsburgh – Thigpen 21 pass from Stewart (N. Johnson kick)
- Denver – FG Elam 35
- Pittsburgh – Stewart 4 run (N. Johnson kick)
- Pittsburgh – Stewart 9 run (N. Johnson kick)

==== Week 16 (Saturday December 13, 1997): at New England Patriots ====
	1	2	3	4	OT	Total
**Steelers**	0	7	3	11	3	**24**
Patriots	0	14	0	7	0	**21**

at Foxboro Stadium, Foxborough, Massachusetts

- Game time: 4:00 pm EST
- Game weather:
- Game attendance: 60,013
- Referee: Mike Carey
- TV announcers: (NBC) Dick Enberg (play by play), Phil Simms & Paul Maguire (color commentators), Jim Gray (sideline reporter)

Scoring drives:

- New England – Coates 18 pass from Bledsoe (Vinatieri kick)
- New England – Gash 1 pass from Bledsoe (Vinatieri kick)
- Pittsburgh – Stewart 1 run (N. Johnson kick)
- Pittsburgh – FG N. Johnson 36
- Pittsburgh – FG N. Johnson 34
- New England – Meggett 49 pass from Bledsoe (Vinatieri kick)
- Pittsburgh – Bruener 1 pass from Stewart (Thigpen pass from Stewart)
- Pittsburgh – FG N. Johnson 31

==== Week 17 (Sunday December 21, 1997): at Tennessee Oilers ====
	1	2	3	4	Total
Steelers	3	0	0	3	**6**
**Oilers**	3	10	3	0	**16**

at Liberty Bowl Memorial Stadium, Memphis, Tennessee

- Game time: 1:00 pm EST
- Game weather:
- Game attendance: 50,677
- Referee: Phil Luckett
- TV announcers: (NBC) Charlie Jones (play by play), Bob Trumpy (color commentator)

Scoring drives:

- Tennessee – FG Del Greco 34
- Pittsburgh – FG N. Johnson 23
- Tennessee – Thomas 25 run (Del Greco kick)
- Tennessee – FG Del Greco 29
- Tennessee – FG Del Greco 26
- Pittsburgh – FG N. Johnson 36

== Playoffs ==
=== Game summaries ===
Both of the Steelers post-season matchups were rematches from the regular season. The Steelers had a first-round bye, then faced the AFC East champion (and defending AFC champion) New England Patriots at home. The game, which was a homecoming for young Patriots players & Pittsburgh area natives Ty Law and Curtis Martin (Martin was in fact playing in his last game with New England before signing with the New York Jets that offseason), was also a rematch of the previous year's AFC Divisional matchup, which took place in Foxborough.

After defeating the Pats, the Steelers would lose to the eventual Super Bowl XXXII champion Denver Broncos 24–21 in Elway's last trip to Pittsburgh.

==== AFC Divisional Playoff (Saturday January 3, 1998): vs. New England Patriots ====
	1	2	3	4	Total
Patriots	0	3	0	3	6
Steelers	7	0	0	0	7

at Three Rivers Stadium, Pittsburgh, Pennsylvania

- Game time: 12:30 pm EST
- Game weather: 52 °F (11 °C) (Light Rain)
- Game attendance: 61,228
- Referee: Walt Coleman
- TV announcers: (NBC) Tom Hammond (play by play), Randy Cross (color commentator), James Lofton (sideline reporter)

Scoring drives:

- Pittsburgh – Stewart 40 run (N. Johnson kick)
- New England – FG Vinatieri 31
- New England – FG Vinatieri 46

As of 2016, this marks the last time the Steelers defeated the Patriots in the playoffs

==== AFC Championship Game (Sunday January 11, 1998): vs. Denver Broncos ====
	1	2	3	4	Total
Broncos	7	17	0	0	24
Steelers	7	7	0	7	21

at Three Rivers Stadium, Pittsburgh, Pennsylvania

- Game time: 12:30 pm EST
- Game weather: 34 °F (1 °C) (Mostly Sunny)
- Game attendance: 61,382
- Referee: Ron Blum
- TV announcers: (NBC) Dick Enberg (play by play), Phil Simms & Paul Maguire (color commentators), Jim Gray & John Dockery (sideline reporters)

Scoring drives:

- Denver – Davis 8 run (Elam kick)
- Pittsburgh – Stewart 33 run (N. Johnson kick)
- Pittsburgh – Bettis 1 run (N. Johnson kick)
- Denver – FG Elam 43
- Denver – Griffith 16 pass from Elway (Elam kick)
- Denver – McCaffrey 1 pass from Elway (Elam kick)
- Pittsburgh – C. Johnson 15 pass from Stewart (N. Johnson kick)

== Honors and awards ==
=== Pro Bowlers ===
See: 1998 Pro Bowl

- No. 36 Jerome Bettis-Running back
- No. 37 Carnell Lake-Safety
- No. 63 Dermontti Dawson-Center
- No. 82 Yancey Thigpen-Wide receiver
- No. 93 Joel Steed-Nose tackle
- No. 99 Levon Kirkland-Inside linebacker

=== All-Pros ===
- Yancy Thigpen (Second-Team)
- Joel Steed (Pro Football Weekly First-Team All-AFC)
- Levon Kirkland (First-Team)
- Dermontti Dawson (First-Team)
- Carnell Lake (First-Team)
- Jerome Bettis (Second-Team)
