= 1999 Pittsburgh Steelers season =

Pittsburgh Steelers 67th US football season

- Owner: The Rooney Family
- General manager: Tom Donahoe
- Head coach: Bill Cowher
- Home stadium: Three Rivers Stadium

Results
- Record: 6–10
- Division place: 4th AFC Central
- Playoffs: Did not qualify
- All-Pros: None
- Pro Bowlers: None
- Team MVP: Levon Kirkland
- Team ROY: Troy Edwards

The 1999 Pittsburgh Steelers season was the franchise’s 67th season as a professional sports franchise and as a member of the National Football League.

For the second consecutive season the Steelers failed to make the playoffs after starting off the season by winning 5 of their first 8 games. Losing seven of the remaining eight dropped Pittsburgh to 6–10 for the year, their worst record under Bill Cowher.

The 1999 Steelers are the only NFL team since at least 1940 to concede so many as five safeties in one season. (Note: Only the 1985 Packers, the 2003 Falcons, and the 2015 Dolphins have otherwise conceded four safeties in an NFL season since 1940.)

== Offseason ==
Additions	Subtractions
T Wayne Gandy (Rams)	CB Carnell Lake (Jaguars)
	WR Charles Johnson (Eagles)

=== 1999 expansion draft ===
Steelers selected during the expansion draft
Pick	Name	Position	Expansion team
9	Rod Manuel	Defensive end	Cleveland Browns

=== NFL draft ===
1999 Pittsburgh Steelers draft
Round	Pick	Player	Position	College	Notes
1	13	Troy Edwards	Wide receiver	Louisiana Tech	
2	59	Scott Shields	Safety	Weber State	
3	73	Joey Porter *	Linebacker	Colorado State	
3	74	Kris Farris	Tackle	UCLA	
3	95	Amos Zereoué	Running back	West Virginia	
4	109	Aaron Smith *	Defensive end	Northern Colorado	
5	136	Jerame Tuman	Tight end	Michigan	
5	166	Malcolm Johnson	Wide receiver	Notre Dame	
7	214	Antonio Dingle	Defensive tackle	Virginia	
7	219	Chad Kelsay	Linebacker	Nebraska	
7	228	Kris Brown	Kicker	Nebraska	
Made roster * Made at least one Pro Bowl during career

=== Undrafted free agents ===
1999 undrafted free agents of note
Player	Position	College
Mike Schneck	Long snapper	Wisconsin
Anthony Wright	Quarterback	South Carolina

== Personnel ==
=== Staff ===
1999 Pittsburgh Steelers staff
Front office: President – Daniel M. Rooney; Vice president and general counsel – Arthur J. Rooney II; Vice president – John R. McGinley; Vice president – Arthur J. Rooney, Jr.; Administration advisor – Chuck Noll; Director of business – Mark Hart; Business relations coordinator – Dan Ferens; Business accounting coordinator – Jim Ellenberger; Office/ticket coordinator – Geraldine Glenn; Accounting manager – Jodie Spagnolli; Communications coordinator – Ron Wahl; Public relations/media manager – David Lockett; Website/network administrator – Kim Smith; Marketing coordinator – Mark Fuhrman; Merchandising manager – Tim Carey; Marketing manager – Lynne Molyneaux; Luxury suite manager – Lisa Weinzetl; Ticket manager – Brian Bonifate; Stadium project manager – Heidi Edwards; Football operations; Director of football operations – Tom Donahoe; College scouting coordinator – Max McCartney; Pro personnel coordinator – Doug Whaley; College scout – Mark Gorscak; College scout – Phil Kreidler; College scout – Bob Lane; College scout – Dan Rooney; College scout – Bill Schieder; Head coaches: Head coach – Bill Cowher; Offensive coaches: Offensive coordinator – Kevin Gilbride; Running backs – Dick Hoak; Wide receivers – Bob Bratkowski; Tight ends – Mike Mularkey; Offensive line – Kent Stephenson	Defensive coaches: Defensive coordinator – Jim Haslett; Defensive line – John Mitchell; Linebackers – Mike Archer; Defensive backs – Tim Lewis; Special teams coaches: Special teams – Jay Hayes; Administrative assistant – Lou Spanos; Administrative assistant – Mike Miller; Strength and conditioning: Conditioning coordinator – Chet Fuhrman; Medical staff; Ophthalmologist – Dr. Randy Beatty; Physician, orthopedic – Dr. James P. Bradley; Neurological surgery consultant – Dr. Joseph Maroon; Physician, M.D. – Dr. Richard Rydze; Physician, consultant – Dr. Abraham J. Twerski; Physician, M.D. – Dr. Anthony P. Yates; Training staff; Head trainer – John Norwig; Assistant trainer – Ryan Grove; Football staff; Player development coordinator – Anthony Griggs; Equipment manager - Rodgers Freyvogel; Field manager – Rich Baker; Field/equipment assistant – Paul Gallagher; Video coordinator – Bob McCartney; Video assistant – Andy Lizanich; Photographers – Mike Fabus, Mike Drazdzinski

Notable additions include Joey Porter and Aaron Smith.

=== Roster ===
1999 Pittsburgh Steelers roster
Quarterbacks (QB): 7 Pete Gonzalez; 10 Kordell Stewart; 18 Mike Tomczak; 1 Anthony Wright; Running backs (RB): 36 Jerome Bettis; 45 Chris Fuamatu-Maʻafala; 33 Richard Huntley; 38 Jon Witman FB; 21 Amos Zereoué; Wide receivers (WR): 81 Troy Edwards; 88 Courtney Hawkins; 83 Malcolm Johnson; 82 Bobby Shaw; 19 Ryan Thelwell; 86 Hines Ward; Tight ends (TE): 87 Mark Bruener; 48 Tony Cline; 80 Matt Cushing	Offensive linemen (OL): 60 Anthony Brown T; 78 Chris Conrad T; 62 Roger Duffy C; 65 Alan Faneca G; 72 Wayne Gandy T; 67 Shar Pourdanesh T; 68 Brenden Stai G; 66 Jim Sweeney C; Defensive linemen (DL): 98 Ernie Brown DE; 76 Kevin Henry DE; 90 Reggie Lowe DE; 71 Orpheus Roye DE; 91 Aaron Smith DE; 94 Jeremy Staat NT; 93 Joel Steed NT	Linebackers (LB): 51 Carlos Emmons OLB; 57 John Fiala ILB; 92 Jason Gildon OLB; 50 Earl Holmes ILB; 97 Chad Kelsay OLB; 99 Levon Kirkland ILB; 55 Joey Porter OLB; 56 Mike Vrabel OLB; Defensive backs (DB): 29 Lance Brown CB; 27 Travis Davis FS; 41 Lethon Flowers SS; 24 Chris Oldham FS; 30 Chad Scott CB; 47 Scott Shields SS; 23 Jason Simmons CB; 26 Deshea Townsend CB; 20 Dewayne Washington CB; Special teams (ST): 3 Kris Brown K; 4 Josh Miller P; 54 Mike Schneck LS	Practice squad: 96 Harry Deligianis DE; 46 Cory Geason TE; 35 Carlos King FB; 13 Junior Lord WR; 64 Tony Orlandini G; Reserve: 89 Will Blackwell WR (IR); 63 Dermontti Dawson C (IR); 77 Kris Farris T (IR); 74 Nolan Harrison DE (IR); 85 Mitch Lyons TE (IR); 73 Justin Strzelczyk T (PUP); 84 Jerame Tuman TE (IR); Rookies in italics 53 active, 7 reserve, 5 practice squad

== Preseason ==
=== Schedule ===
Week	Date	Opponent	Result	Record	Venue
1	August 13	Chicago Bears	W 30–23	1–0	Three Rivers Stadium
2	August 20	at Carolina Panthers	L 13–20	1–1	Ericsson Stadium
3	August 28	Washington Redskins	L 27–14	1–2	Three Rivers Stadium
4	September 4	at Buffalo Bills	L 16–14	1–3	Ralph Wilson Stadium

== Regular season ==
=== Schedule ===
Week	Date	Opponent	Result	Record	Venue
1	September 12	at **Cleveland Browns**	**W** 43–0	1–0	Cleveland Browns Stadium
2	September 19	at **Baltimore Ravens**	**W** 23–20	2–0	PSInet Stadium
3	September 26	Seattle Seahawks	**L** 10–29	2–1	Three Rivers Stadium
4	October 3	**Jacksonville Jaguars**	**L** 3–17	2–2	Three Rivers Stadium
5	October 10	at Buffalo Bills	**L** 21–24	2–3	Ralph Wilson Stadium
6	October 17	at **Cincinnati Bengals**	**W** 17–3	3–3	Cinergy Field
7	October 25	Atlanta Falcons	**W** 13–9	4–3	Three Rivers Stadium
8	Bye				
9	November 7	at San Francisco 49ers	**W** 27–6	5–3	3Com Park
10	November 14	**Cleveland Browns**	**L** 15–16	5–4	Three Rivers Stadium
11	November 21	at **Tennessee Titans**	**L** 10–16	5–5	Adelphia Coliseum
12	November 28	**Cincinnati Bengals**	**L** 20–27	5–6	Three Rivers Stadium
13	December 2	at **Jacksonville Jaguars**	**L** 6–20	5–7	Alltel Stadium
14	December 12	**Baltimore Ravens**	**L** 24–31	5–8	Three Rivers Stadium
15	December 18	at Kansas City Chiefs	**L** 19–35	5–9	Arrowhead Stadium
16	December 26	Carolina Panthers	**W** 30–20	6–9	Three Rivers Stadium
17	January 2	**Tennessee Titans**	**L** 36–47	6–10	Three Rivers Stadium
Note: Intra-division opponents are in **bold** text.

=== Game summaries ===
==== Week 1 (Sunday September 12, 1999): at Cleveland Browns ====
Week One: Pittsburgh Steelers at Cleveland Browns – Game summary

Quarter	1	2	3	4	Total
**Steelers**	7	13	6	17	**43**
Browns	0	0	0	0	**0**

at Cleveland Browns Stadium, Cleveland, Ohio

- Date: September 12
- Game time: 8:25 p.m. EDT
- Game weather: Overcast, 80 °F (27 °C)
- Game attendance: 73,138
- Referee: Bob McElwee
- TV announcers (ESPN): Mike Patrick, Joe Theismann, Paul Maguire, and Solomon Wilcots
- Box score

Game information

**First quarter**

- PIT – Kordell Stewart 1-yard run (Kris Brown kick), 5:16. Steelers 7–0. **Drive: 5 plays, 39 yards, 2:30.**

**Second quarter**

- PIT – Kris Brown 18-yard field goal, 9:56. Steelers 10–0. **Drive: 18 plays, 79 yards, 7:37.**
- PIT – Richard Huntley 5-yard pass from Kordell Stewart (Kris Brown kick), 4:49. Steelers 17–0. **Drive: 6 plays, 56 yards, 3:06.**
- PIT – Kris Brown 28-yard field goal, 0:06. Steelers 20–0. **Drive: 8 plays, 44 yards, 3:31.**

**Third quarter**

- PIT – Richard Huntley 3-yard run (kick failed), 5:28. Steelers 26–0. **Drive: 14 plays, 76 yards, 7:55.**

**Fourth quarter**

- PIT – Kris Brown 19-yard field goal, 11:10. Steelers 29–0. **Drive: 14 plays, 64 yards, 8:00.**
- PIT – Richard Huntley 21-yard pass from Mike Tomczak (Kris Brown kick), 10:48. Steelers 36–0. **Drive: 1 play, 21 yards, 0:09.**
- PIT – Hines Ward 1-yard pass from Mike Tomczak (Kris Brown kick), 6:08. Steelers 43–0. **Drive: 7 plays, 29 yards, 4:19.**

Top passers

- PIT – Kordell Stewart – 15/23, 173 yards, TD
- CLE – Ty Detmer – 6/13, 52 yards, INT

Top rushers

- PIT – Jerome Bettis – 18 rushes, 89 yards
- CLE – Terry Kirby – 5 rushes, 10 yards

Top receivers

- PIT – Richard Huntley – 5 receptions, 67 yards, 2 TD
- CLE – Leslie Shepherd – 2 receptions, 32 yards

==== Week 2 (Sunday September 19, 1999): at Baltimore Ravens ====
	1	2	3	4	Total
**Steelers**	7	7	3	6	**23**
Ravens	7	3	0	10	**20**

at PSINet Stadium, Baltimore, Maryland

- Game time: 1:00 PM EDT
- Game weather:
- Game attendance: 68,965
- Referee: Gerald Austin
- TV announcers: (CBS) Don Criqui (play by play), Steve Tasker (color commentator)

Scoring drives:

- Pittsburgh – Stewart 8 run (Brown kick)
- Baltimore – Rhett 2 run (Stover kick)
- Pittsburgh – Huntley 17 run (Brown kick)
- Baltimore – FG Stover 45
- Pittsburgh – FG Brown 32
- Baltimore – FG Stover 28
- Pittsburgh – FG Brown 28
- Baltimore – Ismail 19 pass from Case (Stover kick)
- Pittsburgh – FG Brown 36

==== Week 3 (Sunday September 26, 1999): vs. Seattle Seahawks ====
	1	2	3	4	Total
**Seahawks**	17	9	0	3	**29**
Steelers	0	0	0	10	**10**

at Three Rivers Stadium, Pittsburgh, Pennsylvania

- Game time: 1:00 PM EDT
- Game weather: 78 °F or 25.6 °C (Sunny)
- Game attendance: 57,881
- Referee: Phil Luckett
- TV announcers: (CBS) Kevin Harlan (play by play), Sam Wyche (color commentator), Marcus Allen (sideline reporter)

Scoring drives:

- Seattle – Hanks 23 interception return (Peterson kick)
- Seattle – Rogers 94 punt return (Peterson kick)
- Seattle – FG Peterson 45
- Seattle – FG Peterson 51
- Seattle – FG Peterson 41
- Seattle – FG Peterson 26
- Pittsburgh – FG Brown 33
- Seattle – FG Peterson 38
- Pittsburgh – Edwards 16 pass from Tomczak (Brown kick)

==== Week 4 (Sunday October 3, 1999): vs. Jacksonville Jaguars ====
	1	2	3	4	Total
**Jaguars**	0	7	3	7	**17**
Steelers	0	3	0	0	**3**

at Three Rivers Stadium, Pittsburgh, Pennsylvania

- Game time: 1:00 PM EDT
- Game weather: 59 °F or 15 °C (Partly Sunny)
- Game attendance: 57,308
- Referee: Dick Hantak
- TV announcers: (CBS) Verne Lundquist (play by play), Dan Dierdorf (color commentator), Bonnie Bernstein (sideline reporter)

Scoring drives:

- Jacksonville – McCardell 7 pass from Brunell (Hollis kick)
- PIttsburgh – FG Brown 48
- Jacksonville – FG Hollis 27
- Jacksonville – FG Hollis 41
- Jacksonville – Safety, Stewart fumbled ball out of end zone
- Jacksonville – Safety, Smeenge sacked Stewart in end zone

==== Week 5 (Sunday October 10, 1999): at Buffalo Bills ====
	1	2	3	4	Total
Steelers	7	7	0	7	**21**
**Bills**	7	10	7	0	**24**

at Ralph Wilson Stadium, Orchard Park, New York

- Game time: 1:00 PM EDT
- Game weather:
- Game attendance: 71,038
- Referee: Ed Hochuli
- TV announcers: (CBS) Verne Lundquist (play by play), Dan Dierdorf (color commentator), Bonnie Bernstein (sideline reporter)

Scoring drives:

- Pittsburgh – Ward 12 pass from Stewart (Brown kick)
- Buffalo – Gash 2 pass from Flutie (Christie kick)
- Buffalo – Moulds 49 pass from Flutie (Christie kick)
- Buffalo – FG Christie 29
- Pittsburgh – Edwards 17 pass from Stewart (Brown kick)
- Buffalo – Riemersma 8 pass from Flutie (Christie kick)
- Pittsburgh – Bettis 1 run (Brown kick)

==== Week 6 (Sunday October 17, 1999): at Cincinnati Bengals ====
	1	2	3	4	Total
**Steelers**	7	7	0	3	**17**
Bengals	3	0	0	0	**3**

at Cinergy Field, Cincinnati, Ohio

- Game time: 1:00 PM EDT
- Game weather:
- Game attendance: 59,669
- Referee: Jeff Triplette
- TV announcers: (CBS) Gus Johnson (play by play), Brent Jones (color commentator)

Scoring drives:

- Pittsburgh – Bettis 1 run (Brown kick)
- Cincinnati – FG Pelfrey 37
- Pittsburgh – Bettis 5 run (Brown kick)
- Pittsburgh – FG Brown 43

==== Week 7 (Monday October 25, 1999): vs. Atlanta Falcons ====
	1	2	3	4	Total
Falcons	0	0	0	9	**9**
**Steelers**	7	6	0	0	**13**

at Three Rivers Stadium, Pittsburgh, Pennsylvania

- Game time: 9:00 PM EDT
- Game weather: 48 °F or 8.9 °C (Clear)
- Game attendance: 58,141
- Referee: Ron Winter
- TV announcers: (ABC) Al Michaels (play by play), Boomer Esiason (color commentator), Lesley Visser (sideline reporter)

Scoring drives:

- Pittsburgh – Huntley 13 pass from Stewart (Brown kick)
- Pittsburgh – FG Brown 51
- Pittsburgh – FG Brown 25
- Atlanta – Mathis 5 pass from Chandler (Andersen kick)
- Atlanta – Safety, Miller stepped out of end zone

==== Week 9 (Sunday November 7, 1999): at San Francisco 49ers ====
	1	2	3	4	Total
**Steelers**	14	3	3	7	**27**
49ers	3	3	0	0	**6**

at 3Com Park, San Francisco, California

- Game time: 4:15 PM EST
- Game weather: 55 °F or 12.8 °C (Rain)
- Game attendance: 68,657
- Referee: Tom White
- TV announcers: (CBS) Greg Gumbel (play by play), Phil Simms (color commentator), Armen Keteyian (sideline reporter)

Scoring drives:

- Pittsburgh – Bettis 1 run (Brown kick)
- San Francisco – FG Richey 19
- Pittsburgh – Ward 13 pass from Stewart (Brown kick)
- PIttsburgh – FG Brown 28
- San Francisco – FG Richey 20
- Pittsburgh – FG Brown 38
- Pittsburgh – Bettis 22 run (Brown kick)

==== Week 10 (Sunday November 14, 1999): vs. Cleveland Browns ====
	1	2	3	4	Total
**Browns**	7	0	0	9	**16**
Steelers	3	0	9	3	**15**

at Three Rivers Stadium, Pittsburgh, Pennsylvania

- Game time: 1:00 PM EST
- Game weather: 53 °F or 11.7 °C (Partly Sunny)
- Game attendance: 58,213
- Referee: Johnny Grier
- TV announcers: (CBS) Craig Bolerjack (play by play), Beasley Reece (color commentator)

Scoring drives:

- Cleveland – K. Johnson 35 pass from Couch (Dawson kick)
- Pittsburgh – FG Brown 41
- Pittsburgh – FG Brown 32
- Pittsburgh – Huntley 5 run (run failed)
- Pittsburgh – FG Brown 47
- Cleveland – Edwards 5 pass from Couch (run failed)
- Cleveland – FG Dawson 39

==== Week 11 (Sunday November 21, 1999): at Tennessee Titans ====
	1	2	3	4	Total
Steelers	7	0	0	3	**10**
**Titans**	14	0	2	0	**16**

at Adelphia Coliseum, Nashville, Tennessee

- Game time: 1:00 PM EST
- Game weather:
- Game attendance: 66,619
- Referee: Mike Carey
- TV announcers: (CBS) Don Criqui (play by play), Steve Tasker (color commentator)

Scoring drives:

- Tennessee – McNair 2 run (Del Greco kick)
- Pittsburgh – Edwards 15 pass from Stewart (Brown kick)
- Tennessee – McNair 3 run (Del Greco kick)
- Tennessee – Safety, Stewart penalized for intentional grounding in end zone
- Pittsburgh – FG Brown 24

==== Week 12 (Sunday November 28, 1999): vs. Cincinnati Bengals ====
	1	2	3	4	Total
**Bengals**	14	10	3	0	**27**
Steelers	3	10	7	0	**20**

at Three Rivers Stadium, Pittsburgh, Pennsylvania

- Game time: 1:00 PM EST
- Game weather: 45 °F or 7.2 °C (Mostly Sunny)
- Game attendance: 50,907
- Referee: Walt Coleman
- TV announcers: (CBS) Bill Macatee (play by play), Beasley Reece (color commentator)

Scoring drives:

- Cincinnati – Scott 76 pass from Blake (Pelfrey kick)
- Cincinnati – Blake 4 run (Pelfrey kick)
- Pittsburgh – FG Brown 35
- Cincinnati – Heath 58 interception return (Pelfrey kick)
- Cincinnati – FG Pelfrey 29
- Pittsburgh – FG Brown 33
- Pittsburgh – Shaw 15 pass from Tomczak (Brown kick)
- Pittsburgh – Ward 34 pass from Tomczak (Brown kick)
- Cincinnati – FG Pelfrey 29

==== Week 13 (Thursday December 2, 1999): at Jacksonville Jaguars ====
	1	2	3	4	Total
Steelers	3	0	3	0	**6**
**Jaguars**	0	6	7	7	**20**

at Alltel Stadium, Jacksonville, Florida

- Game time: 8:20 PM EST
- Game weather:
- Game attendance: 68,806
- Referee: Bill Carollo
- TV announcers: (ESPN) Mike Patrick (play by play), Joe Theismann & Paul Maguire (color commentators), Solomon Wilcots (sideline reporter)

Scoring drives:

- Pittsburgh – FG Brown 40
- Jacksonville – FG Hollis 25
- Jacksonville – FG Hollis 32
- Pittsburgh – FG Brown 39
- Jacksonville – Smith 27 pass from Brunell (Hollis kick)
- Jacksonville – Stewart 1 run (Hollis kick)

==== Week 14 (Sunday December 12, 1999): vs. Baltimore Ravens ====
	1	2	3	4	Total
**Ravens**	7	3	21	0	**31**
Steelers	10	0	7	7	**24**

at Three Rivers Stadium, Pittsburgh, Pennsylvania

- Game time: 1:00 PM EST
- Game weather: 42 °F or 5.6 °C (Partly Sunny)
- Game attendance: 46,715
- Referee: Jeff Triplette
- TV announcers: (CBS) Ian Eagle (play by play), Mark May (color commentator)

Scoring drives:

- Pittsburgh – Ward 21 pass from Bettis (Brown kick)
- Baltimore – Holmes 64 run (Stover kick)
- Pittsburgh – FG Brown 31
- Baltimore – FG Stover 19
- Baltimore – Ismail 54 pass from Banks (Stover kick)
- Pittsburgh – Edwards 6 pass from Tomczak (Brown kick)
- Baltimore – Ismail 59 pass from Banks (Stover kick)
- Baltimore – Ismail 76 pass from Banks (Stover kick)
- Pittsburgh – Stewart 11 pass from Tomczak (Brown kick)

==== Week 15 (Saturday December 18, 1999): at Kansas City Chiefs ====
	1	2	3	4	Total
Steelers	10	3	0	6	**19**
**Chiefs**	7	14	7	7	**35**

at Arrowhead Stadium, Kansas City, Missouri

- Game time: 12:30 PM EST
- Game weather:
- Game attendance: 78,697
- Referee: Larry Nemmers
- TV announcers: (CBS) Verne Lundquist (play by play), Dan Dierdorf (color commentator), Bonnie Bernstein (sideline reporter)

Scoring drives:

- Pittsburgh – T. Edwards 12 pass from Tomczak (Brown kick)
- Kansas City – Gonzales 15 pass from Grbac (Stoyanovich kick)
- Pittsburgh – FG Brown 42
- Kansas City – D. Edwards 28 interception return (Stoyanovich kick)
- Kansas City – Gonzales 2 pass from Grbac (Stoyanovich kick)
- Pittsburgh – FG Brown 47
- Kansas City – Alexander 82 run (Stoyanovich kick)
- Kansas City – Morris 10 run (Stoyanovich kick)
- Pittsburgh – Shaw 11 pass from Tomczak (pass failed)

==== Week 16 (Sunday December 26, 1999): vs. Carolina Panthers ====
	1	2	3	4	Total
Panthers	7	13	0	0	**20**
**Steelers**	10	13	0	7	**30**

at Three Rivers Stadium, Pittsburgh, Pennsylvania

- Game time: 1:00 PM EST
- Game weather: 30 °F or −1.1 °C (Light Snow)
- Game attendance: 39,428
- Referee: Bob McElwee
- TV announcers: (FOX) Ray Bentley (play by play), Ron Pitts (color commentator), Alby Oxenreiter (sideline reporter)

Scoring drives:

- Pittsburgh – FG Brown 46
- Pittsburgh – Davis 102 fumble return (Brown kick)
- Carolina – Lane 41 run (Kasay kick)
- Pittsburgh – Huntley 25 run (fumbled snap)
- Carolina – Jeffers 88 pass from Beuerlein (kick failed)
- Pittsburgh – Ward 9 pass from Tomczak (Brown kick)
- Carolina – Jeffers 43 pass from Beuerlein (Kasay kick)
- Pittsburgh – Bettis 8 run (Brown kick)

==== Week 17 (Sunday January 2, 2000): vs. Tennessee Titans ====
	1	2	3	4	Total
**Titans**	7	24	9	7	**47**
Steelers	7	0	22	7	**36**

at Three Rivers Stadium, Pittsburgh, Pennsylvania

- Game time: 4:15 PM EST
- Game weather: 66 °F or 18.9 °C (Mostly Cloudy)
- Game attendance: 48,025
- Referee: Tom White
- TV announcers: (CBS) Don Criqui (play by play), Steve Tasker (color commentator)

Scoring drives:

- Tennessee – Wycheck 9 pass from McNair (Del Greco kick)
- Pittsburgh – Huntley 8 run (Brown kick)
- Tennessee – Thomas 11 run (Del Greco kick)
- Tennessee – Wycheck 26 pass from O'Donnell (Del Greco kick)
- Tennessee – Kearse 14 fumble return (Del Greco kick)
- Tennessee – FG Del Greco 42
- Pittsburgh – Ward 15 pass from Tomczak (Ward pass from Tomczak)
- Tennessee – Safety, Thorton sacked Tomczak in end zone
- Tennessee – Roan 24 pass from O'Donnell (Del Greco kick)
- Pittsburgh – Bettis 1 run (Brown kick)
- Pittsburgh – Porter 46 fumble return (Brown kick)
- Tennessee – Walker 83 fumble return (Del Greco kick)
- Pittsburgh – Shaw 35 pass from Tomczak (Brown kick)

=== Standings ===
AFC Central
	W	L	T	PCT	PF	PA	STK
^{(1)} Jacksonville Jaguars	14	2	0	.875	396	217	W1
^{(4)} Tennessee Titans	13	3	0	.813	392	324	W4
Baltimore Ravens	8	8	0	.500	324	277	L1
Pittsburgh Steelers	6	10	0	.375	317	320	L1
Cincinnati Bengals	4	12	0	.250	283	460	L2
Cleveland Browns	2	14	0	.125	217	437	L6
