= 1996 Pittsburgh Steelers season =

US football sports season

- Owner: The Rooney Family
- General manager: Tom Donahoe
- Head coach: Bill Cowher
- Offensive coordinator: Chan Gailey
- Defensive coordinator: Dick LeBeau
- Home stadium: Three Rivers Stadium

Results
- Record: 10–6
- Division place: 1st AFC Central
- Playoffs: Won Wild Card Playoffs (vs. Colts) 42–14; Lost Divisional Playoffs (at Patriots) 3–28
- All-Pros: 4: Jerome Bettis (1st team); Chad Brown (1st team); Dermontti Dawson (1st team); Levon Kirkland (2nd team)
- Pro Bowlers: 6: RB Jerome Bettis; OLB Chad Brown; C Dermontti Dawson; ILB Levon Kirkland; SS Carnell Lake; CB Rod Woodson
- Team MVP: Jerome Bettis
- Team ROY: Jon Witman

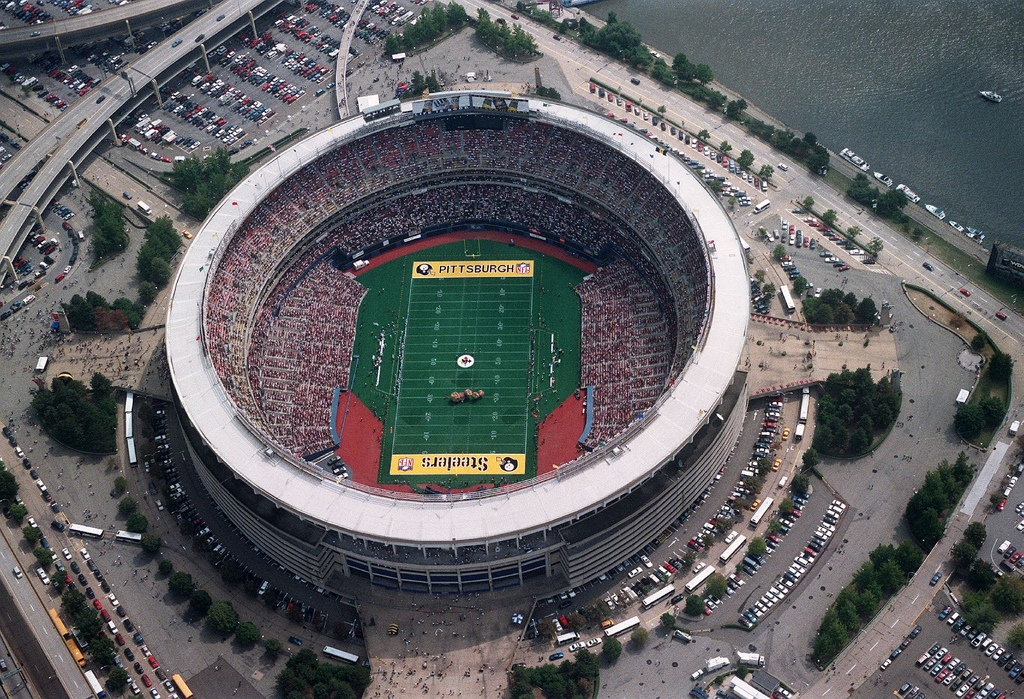
Aerial view of Three Rivers Stadium hosting an NFL game for the Pittsburgh Steelers versus the Baltimore Ravens on September 8, 1996

The 1996 Pittsburgh Steelers season was the franchise's 64th season as a professional sports franchise and as a member of the National Football League.

This was Bill Cowher's fifth season as head coach of the Steelers, which resulted in yet another trip to the playoffs for the team, as Pittsburgh won the AFC Central championship for the fourth time under Cowher.

The team's 10–6 record was not enough to earn the Steelers a first-round bye. In their first playoff game, a rematch of the previous year's AFC Championship Game, the Steelers defeated the Indianapolis Colts, 42–14. The following their season would come to a halt as the Steelers lost to the New England Patriots, 28–3.

This would be the final season that the team wore block numerals, the next year they would switch to rounded numerals where it has remained ever since.

== Offseason ==
Additions	Subtractions
RB Jerome Bettis (Rams)	LB Kevin Greene (Panthers)
C Jim Sweeney (Seahawks)	QB Neil O'Donnell (Jets)
	P Rohn Stark (Panthers)
	G/T Ariel Solomon (Vikings)
	FB John L. Williams (retirement)
	G Tom Newberry (retirement)

=== NFL draft ===
1996 Pittsburgh Steelers draft
Round	Pick	Player	Position	College	Notes
1	29	Jamain Stephens	Tackle	North Carolina A&T	
3	72	Steve Conley	Linebacker	Arkansas	
3	92	Jon Witman	Fullback	Penn State	
4	126	Earl Holmes	Linebacker	Florida A&M	
4	132	Jahine Arnold	Wide receiver	Fresno State	
5	163	Israel Raybon	Defensive end	North Alabama	
6	200	Orpheus Roye	Defensive end	Florida State	
6	203	Spence Fischer	Quarterback	Duke	
7	242	Carlos Emmons	Linebacker	Arkansas State	
Made roster

=== Undrafted free agents ===
1996 undrafted free agents of note
Player	Position	College
Ricky Bell	Cornerback	North Carolina State
Lorenzo Green	Defensive tackle	Oklahoma State
Chris Jones	Wide receiver	Mississippi State
Cornell Parker	Cornerback	SMU
Lewis Tyree	Offensive linemen	Florida State

== Personnel ==
=== Coaches / Staff ===
1996 Pittsburgh Steelers staff
Front office: President – Daniel M. Rooney; Vice president – John R. McGinley; Vice president – Arthur J. Rooney, Jr.; Vice president and general counsel – Arthur J. Rooney II; Administration advisor – Chuck Noll; Director of marketing – Joe Gordon; Marketing coordinator – Mark Fuhrman; Merchandising manager – Tim Carey; Assistant marketing manager – Lynne Molyneaux; Media relations coordinator – Rob Boulware; Assistant/community relations – Ron Miller; Director of business – Mark Hart; Business coordinator – Dan Ferens; Accounts coordinator – Jim Ellenberger; Office/ticket manager – Geraldine Glenn; Football operations; Director of football operations – Tom Donahoe; Scouting staff; College personnel coordinator – Tom Modrak; Pro personnel coordinator – Charles Bailey; BLESTO College Scout – Mark Gorscak; College scout – Phil Kreidler; College scout – Bob Lane; College scout – Max McCartney; Head coaches: Head coach – Bill Cowher; Offensive coaches: Offensive coordinator – Chan Gailey; Running backs – Dick Hoak; Wide receivers – David Culley; Tight ends – Mike Mularkey; Offensive line – Kent Stephenson	Defensive coaches: Defensive coordinator – Dick LeBeau; Defensive line – John Mitchell; Linebackers – Mike Archer; Defensive backs – Tim Lewis; Special teams coaches: Special teams – Ron Zook; Strength and conditioning: Conditioning coordinator – Chet Fuhrman; Medical staff; Physician, orthopedic – Dr. James P. Bradley; Ophthalmologist – Dr. Randy Beatty; Neurological surgery consultant – Dr. Joseph Maroon; Physician, M.D. – Dr. Richard Rydze; Physician, consultant – Dr. Abraham J. Twerski; Physician, M.D. – Dr. Anthony P. Yates; Training staff; Head trainer – John Norwig; Assistant trainer – Rick Burkholder; Equipment manager – Anthony Parisi; Field manager – Rodgers Freyvogel; Field assistant – Rich Baker; Video coordinator – Bob McCartney; Video assistant – Pat Dolan; Player development coordinator – Anthony Griggs; Administrative assistant – Lou Spanos; Photographers – Mike Fabus, Bill Amatucci

Notable additions include Jerome Bettis, Earl Holmes and Carlos Emmons.

=== Final roster ===
1996 Pittsburgh Steelers roster
Quarterbacks (QB): 16 Jim Miller; 18 Mike Tomczak; Running backs (RB): 36 Jerome Bettis; 34 Tim Lester FB; 25 Fred McAfee; 44 Terry Richardson; 38 Jon Witman FB; Wide receivers (WR): 80 Jahine Arnold KR; 88 Andre Hastings PR; 83 Corey Holliday; 81 Charles Johnson KR; 89 Ernie Mills KR; 10 Kordell Stewart; 82 Yancey Thigpen; Tight ends (TE): 84 Kirk Botkin LS; 86 John Farquhar; 85 Jonathan Hayes	Offensive linemen (OL): 72 Bernard Dafney T; 63 Dermontti Dawson C; 65 John Jackson T; 62 Tom Myslinski G; 68 Brenden Stai G; 67 Jamain Stephens T; 73 Justin Strzelczyk G/T; 66 Jim Sweeney C; 77 Will Wolford G; Defensive linemen (DL): 96 Brentson Buckner DE; 98 Oliver Gibson NT; 76 Kevin Henry DE; 90 Bill Johnson DE; 91 Israel Raybon DE; 71 Orpheus Roye DE; 93 Joel Steed NT	Linebackers (LB): 94 Chad Brown OLB; 53 Steve Conley OLB; 51 Carlos Emmons OLB; 92 Jason Gildon OLB; 50 Earl Holmes ILB; 54 Donta Jones OLB; 99 Levon Kirkland ILB; 55 Jerry Olsavsky ILB; 57 Eric Ravotti OLB; Defensive backs (DB): 40 Myron Bell SS; 21 Deon Figures CB; 41 Lethon Flowers FS; 29 Randy Fuller CB; 37 Carnell Lake SS; 24 Chris Oldham CB; 39 Darren Perry FS; 27 Willie Williams CB; 26 Rod Woodson CB; Special teams (ST): 9 Norm Johnson K; 4 Josh Miller P	Practice squad: 23 Kirk Pointer S; 69 Matt Storm G; Reserve: 87 Mark Bruener TE (IR); 95 Greg Lloyd LB (IR); 20 Erric Pegram RB (IR); 97 Ray Seals DE (IR); 56 Patrick Scott LB (IR); Rookies in italics 53 active, 5 reserve, 2 practice squad

== Preseason ==
=== Schedule ===
Week	Date	Opponent	Result	Record	Venue
1	July 27	vs. San Diego Chargers	L 10–20	0–1	Tokyo Dome (Tokyo, Japan)
2	August 3	St. Louis Rams	W 16–10	1–1	Three Rivers Stadium
3	August 11	at Green Bay Packers	L 17–24	1–2	Lambeau Field
4	August 17	Tampa Bay Buccaneers	W 13–3	2–2	Three Rivers Stadium
5	August 23	at Philadelphia Eagles	L 19–20	2–3	Veterans Stadium

== Regular season ==
=== Schedule ===
Week	Date	Opponent	Result	Record	Venue
1	September 1	at Jacksonville Jaguars	**L** 9–24	0–1	Alltel Stadium
2	September 8	Baltimore Ravens	**W** 31–17	1–1	Three Rivers Stadium
3	September 16	Buffalo Bills	**W** 24–6	2–1	Three Rivers Stadium
4	Bye				
5	September 29	Houston Oilers	**W** 30–16	3–1	Three Rivers Stadium
6	October 7	at Kansas City Chiefs	**W** 17–7	4–1	Arrowhead Stadium
7	October 13	Cincinnati Bengals	**W** 20–10	5–1	Three Rivers Stadium
8	October 20	at Houston Oilers	**L** 13–23	5–2	Astrodome
9	October 27	at Atlanta Falcons	**W** 20–17	6–2	Georgia Dome
10	November 3	St. Louis Rams	**W** 42–6	7–2	Three Rivers Stadium
11	November 10	at Cincinnati Bengals	**L** 24–34	7–3	Cinergy Field
12	November 17	Jacksonville Jaguars	**W** 28–3	8–3	Three Rivers Stadium
13	November 25	at Miami Dolphins	**W** 24–17	9–3	Pro Player Stadium
14	December 1	at Baltimore Ravens	**L** 17–31	9–4	Memorial Stadium
15	December 8	San Diego Chargers	**W** 16–3	10–4	Three Rivers Stadium
16	December 15	San Francisco 49ers	**L** 15–25	10–5	Three Rivers Stadium
17	December 22	at Carolina Panthers	**L** 14–18	10–6	Ericsson Stadium
Note: Intra-division opponents are in **bold** text.

=== Game summaries ===
==== Week 1 (Sunday September 1, 1996): at Jacksonville Jaguars ====
	1	2	3	4	Total
Steelers	3	3	3	0	**9**
**Jaguars**	7	7	0	10	**24**

at Alltel Stadium, Jacksonville, Florida

- Game time: 1:00 pm EDT
- Game weather:
- Game attendance: 70,210
- Referee: Bob McElwee
- TV announcers: (NBC) Marv Albert (play by play), Sam Wyche (color commentator)

Scoring drives:

- Jacksonville – Jackson 38 pass from Brunell (Hollis kick)
- Pittsburgh – FG Johnson 48
- Pittsburgh – FG Johnson 29
- Jacksonville – McCardell 15 pass from Brunell (Hollis kick)
- Pittsburgh – FG Johnson 23
- Jacksonville – FG Hollis 52
- Jacksonville – J. Stewart 1 run (Hollis kick)

==== Week 2 (Sunday September 8, 1996): vs. Baltimore Ravens ====
	1	2	3	4	Total
Ravens	7	10	0	0	**17**
**Steelers**	14	14	3	0	**31**

at Three Rivers Stadium, Pittsburgh, Pennsylvania

- Game time: 1:00 pm EDT
- Game weather: 75 °F (24 °C) (Partly Sunny)
- Game attendance: 57,241
- Referee: Gerry Austin
- TV announcers: (NBC) Marv Albert (play by play), Sam Wyche (color commentator)

Scoring drives:

- Pittsburgh – Woodson 43 interception return (Johnson kick)
- Baltimore – Testaverde 6 run (Stover kick)
- Pittsburgh – Bettis 1 run (Johnson kick)
- Baltimore – Alexander 17 pass from Testaverde (Stover kick)
- Pittsburgh – C. Johnson 5 pass from Tomczak (Johnson kick)
- Pittsburgh – Hastings 20 pass from Tomczak (Johnson kick)
- Baltimore – FG Stover 29
- Pittsburgh – FG Johnson 35

==== Week 3 (Monday September 16, 1996): vs. Buffalo Bills ====
	1	2	3	4	Total
Bills	3	0	3	0	**6**
**Steelers**	7	17	0	0	**24**

at Three Rivers Stadium, Pittsburgh, Pennsylvania

- Game time: 9:00 pm EDT
- Game weather: 58 °F (14 °C) (Cloudy)
- Game attendance: 59,002
- Referee: Larry Nemmers
- TV announcers: (ABC) Al Michaels (play by play), Frank Gifford & Dan Dierdorf (color commentators)

Scoring drives:

- Buffalo – FG Christie 31
- Pittsburgh – Bettis 1 run (Johnson kick)
- Pittsburgh – FG Johnson 30
- Pittsburgh – Bettis 43 run (Johnson kick)
- Pittsburgh – Lake 47 interception return (Johnson kick)
- Buffalo – FG Christie 45

==== Week 5 (Sunday September 29, 1996): vs. Houston Oilers ====
	1	2	3	4	Total
Oilers	0	0	14	2	**16**
**Steelers**	17	3	0	10	**30**

at Three Rivers Stadium, Pittsburgh, Pennsylvania

- Game time: 1:00 pm EDT
- Game weather: 59 °F (15 °C) (Mostly Sunny)
- Game attendance: 58,608
- Referee: Tom White
- TV announcers: (NBC) Don Criqui (play by play), Beasley Reece (color commentator)

Scoring drives:

- Pittsburgh – Stewart 16 pass from Tomczak (Johnson kick)
- Pittsburgh – FG Johnson 33
- Pittsburgh – C. Johnson 62 pass from Tomczak (Johnson kick)
- Pittsburgh – FG Johnson 36
- Houston – Davis 4 pass from Chandler (Del Greco kick)
- Houston – Lewis 36 interception return (Del Greco kick)
- Pittsburgh – FG N. Johnson 36
- Pittsburgh – Perry 13 interception return (Johnson kick)
- Houston – Safety, Edge ran out of end zone

==== Week 6 (Monday October 7, 1996): at Kansas City Chiefs ====
	1	2	3	4	Total
**Steelers**	0	6	8	3	**17**
Chiefs	0	7	0	0	**7**

at Arrowhead Stadium, Kansas City, Missouri

- Game time: 9:00 pm EDT
- Game weather:
- Game attendance: 79,189
- Referee: Howard Roe
- TV announcers: (ABC) Al Michaels (play by play), Frank Gifford & Dan Dierdorf (color commentators)

Scoring drives:

- Kansas City – Allen 6 run (Stoyanovich kick)
- Pittsburgh – FG Johnson 21
- Pittsburgh – FG Johnson 32
- Pittsburgh – Bettis 5 run (Bruener pass from Tomczak)
- Pittsburgh – FG Johnson 43

==== Week 7 (Sunday October 13, 1996): vs. Cincinnati Bengals ====
	1	2	3	4	Total
Bengals	0	0	3	7	**10**
**Steelers**	3	0	7	10	**20**

at Three Rivers Stadium, Pittsburgh, Pennsylvania

- Game time: 1:00 pm EDT
- Game weather: 64 °F (18 °C) (Partly Sunny)
- Game attendance: 58,875
- Referee: Gary Lane
- TV announcers: (NBC) Charlie Jones (play by play), Randy Cross (color commentator)

Scoring drives:

- Pittsburgh – FG Johnson 33
- Cincinnati – FG Pelfrey 19
- Pittsburgh – Stewart 32 pass from Tomczak (Johnson kick)
- Pittsburgh – FG Johnson 22
- Pittsburgh – Woodson 42 fumble return (Johnson kick)
- Cincinnati – Pickens 3 pass from Blake (Pelfrey kick)

==== Week 8 (Sunday October 20, 1996): at Houston Oilers ====
	1	2	3	4	Total
Steelers	7	3	0	3	**13**
**Oilers**	3	6	0	14	**23**

at Astrodome, Houston, Texas

- Game time: 4:00 pm EDT
- Game weather: Dome
- Game attendance: 50,337
- Referee: Red Cashion
- TV announcers: (NBC) Don Criqui (play by play), Beasley Reece (color commentator)

Scoring drives:

- Houston – FG Del Greco 22
- Pittsburgh – C. Johnson 70 pass from Tomczak (Johnson kick)
- Pittsburgh – FG Johnson 26
- Houston – FG Del Greco 32
- Houston – FG Del Greco 48
- Pittsburgh – FG Johnson 29
- Houston – W. Davis 34 pass from Chandler (Del Greco kick)
- Houston – George 2 run (Del Greco kick)

==== Week 9 (Sunday October 27, 1996): at Atlanta Falcons ====
	1	2	3	4	Total
**Steelers**	3	0	14	3	**20**
Falcons	7	3	0	7	**17**

at Georgia Dome, Atlanta, Georgia

- Game time: 1:00 pm EST
- Game weather: Dome
- Game attendance: 58,760
- Referee: Ron Blum
- TV announcers: (NBC) Dan Hicks (play by play), Bob Trumpy (color commentator)

Scoring drives:

- Pittsburgh – FG Johnson 27
- Atlanta – Tobeck 1 pass from Hebert (Andersen kick)
- Atlanta – FG Andersen 41
- Pittsburgh – Hastings 112 pass from Tomczak (Johnson kick)
- Pittsburgh – Bettis 1 run (Johnson kick)
- Atlanta – Emanuel 4 pass from Hebert (Andersen kick)
- Pittsburgh – FG Johnson 20

==== Week 10 (Sunday November 3, 1996): vs. St. Louis Rams ====
	1	2	3	4	Total
Rams	0	3	3	0	**6**
**Steelers**	14	7	14	7	**42**

at Three Rivers Stadium, Pittsburgh, Pennsylvania

- Game time: 1:00 pm EST
- Game weather: 38 °F (3 °C) (Partly Sunny)
- Game attendance: 58,148
- Referee: Jerry Markbreit
- TV announcers: (FOX) Joe Buck (play by play), Bill Maas (color commentator)

Scoring drives:

- Pittsburgh – Bettis 3 run (Johnson kick)
- Pittsburgh – Bettis 50 run (Johnson kick)
- Saint louis – FG Lohmiller 25
- Pittsburgh – Stewart 7 run (Johnson kick)
- Saint louis – FG Lohmiller 27
- Pittsburgh- Pegram 91 kickoff return (Johnson kick)
- Pittsburgh – Stewart 2 run (Johnson kick)
- Pittsburgh – Pegram 17 run (Johnson kick)

==== Week 11 (Sunday November 10, 1996): at Cincinnati Bengals ====
	1	2	3	4	Total
**Steelers**	0	17	7	0	**24**
Bengals	3	14	7	10	**34**

at Cinergy Field, Cincinnati, Ohio

- Game time: 1:00 pm EST
- Game weather:
- Game attendance: 57,265
- Referee: Mike Carey
- TV announcers: (NBC) Don Criqui (play by play), Beasley Reece (color commentator)

Scoring drives:

- Cincinnati – FG Pelfrey 32
- Pittsburgh- FG Johnson 46
- Pittsburgh – Bettis 6 run (Johnson kick)
- Cincinnati – Carter 1 run (Pelfrey kick)
- Pittsburgh – Stewart 1 run (Johnson kick)
- Cincinnati – Dunn 90 kickoff return (Pelfrey kick)
- Pittsburgh – Bettis 1 run (Johnson kick)
- Cincinnati – Bieniemy 33 run (Pelfrey kick)
- Cincinnati – Carter 12 pass from Blake (Pelfrey kick)
- Cincinnati – FG Pelfrey 34

==== Week 12 (Sunday November 17, 1996): vs. Jacksonville Jaguars ====
	1	2	3	4	Total
Jaguars	0	3	0	0	**3**
**Steelers**	14	14	0	0	**28**

at Three Rivers Stadium, Pittsburgh, Pennsylvania

- Game time: 1:00 pm EST
- Game weather: 50 °F (10 °C) (Cloudy)
- Game attendance: 58,879
- Referee: Bernie Kukar
- TV announcers: (NBC) Jim Lampley (play by play), Bob Golic (color commentator)

Scoring drives:

- Pittsburgh – Thigpen 12 pass from Tomczak (Johnson kick)
- Pittsburgh – Bettis 3 run (Johnson kick)
- Jacksonville – FG Hollis 40
- Pittsburgh – Lake 85 fumble return (Johnson kick)
- Pittsburgh – Thigpen 28 pass from Tomczak (Johnson kick)

==== Week 13 (Monday November 25, 1996): at Miami Dolphins ====
	1	2	3	4	Total
**Steelers**	3	7	7	7	**24**
Dolphins	7	7	3	0	**17**

at Pro Player Stadium, Miami, Florida

- Game time: 9:00 pm EST
- Game weather:
- Game attendance: 73,849
- Referee: Walt Coleman
- TV announcers: (ABC) Al Michaels (play by play), Frank Gifford & Dan Dierdorf (color commentators)

Scoring drives:

- Miami – McDuffie 2 pass from Marino (Nedney kick)
- Pittsburgh – FG Johnson 47
- Miami – Jackson 61 interception return (Nedney kick)
- Pittsburgh- Lester 5 run (Johnson kick)
- Pittsburgh – Stewart 5 run (Johnson kick)
- Miami – FG Nedney 41
- Pittsburgh – Mills 20 pass from Tomczak (Johnson kick)

==== Week 14 (Sunday December 1, 1996): at Baltimore Ravens ====
	1	2	3	4	Total
Steelers	7	3	7	0	**17**
**Ravens**	7	17	0	7	**31**

at Memorial Stadium, Baltimore, Maryland

- Game time: 1:00 pm EST
- Game weather:
- Game attendance: 51,882
- Referee: Red Cashion
- TV announcers: (NBC) Jim Lampley (play by play), Bob Golic (color commentator)

Scoring drives:

- Baltimore – Ogden 1 pass from Testaverde (Stover kick)
- Pittsburgh – Hastings 30 pass from Tomczak (Johnson kick)
- Pittsburgh- FG Johnson 22
- Baltimore – Alexander 24 pass from Testaverd (Stover kick)
- Baltimore – Byner 7 run (Stover kick)
- Baltimore – FG Stover 40
- Pittsburgh – Hastings 5 pass from Tomzak (Johnson kick)
- Baltimore – Green 3 pass from Testaverde (Stover kick)

==== Week 15 (Sunday December 8, 1996): vs. San Diego Chargers ====
	1	2	3	4	Total
Chargers	0	0	3	0	**3**
**Steelers**	6	7	0	3	**16**

at Three Rivers Stadium, Pittsburgh, Pennsylvania

- Game time: 1:00 pm EST
- Game weather: 40 °F (4 °C) (Partly Sunny)
- Game attendance: 56,368
- Referee: Gerry Austin
- TV announcers: (NBC) Tom Hammond (play by play), Bob Trumpy (color commentator)

Scoring drives:

- Pittsburgh – FG Johnson 49
- Pittsburgh – FG Johnson 39
- Pittsburgh – Hastings 11 pass from Tomzak (Johnson kick)
- San Diego – FG Carney 25
- Pittsburgh – FG Johnson 21

==== Week 16 (Sunday December 15, 1996): vs. San Francisco 49ers ====
	1	2	3	4	Total
**49ers**	16	6	0	3	**25**
Steelers	0	0	8	7	**15**

at Three Rivers Stadium, Pittsburgh, Pennsylvania

- Game time: 1:00 pm EST
- Game weather: 38 °F (3 °C) (Partly Sunny)
- Game attendance: 59,823
- Referee: Bob McElwee
- TV announcers: (FOX) Pat Summerall (play by play), John Madden (color commentator)

Scoring drives:

- San Francisco – Rice 4 pass from S. Young (Wilkins kick)
- San Francisco – Safety, B. Young sacked Tomczak in end zone
- San Francisco – Rice 4 pass from S. Young (Wilkins kick)
- San Francisco – Owens 20 pass from S. Young (kick failed)
- Pittsburgh – Bettis 1 run (C. Johnson pass from Tomczak)
- San Francisco – FG Wilkins 22
- Pittsburgh – Stewart 42 pass from Tomczak (Johnson kick)

==== Week 17 (Sunday December 22, 1996): at Carolina Panthers ====
	1	2	3	4	Total
Steelers	0	14	0	0	**14**
**Panthers**	7	2	6	3	**18**

at Ericsson Stadium, Charlotte, North Carolina

- Game time: 1:00 pm EST
- Game weather:
- Game attendance: 72,217
- Referee: Dick Hantak
- TV announcers: (NBC) Don Criqui (play by play), Beasley Reece (color commentator)

Scoring drives:

- Carolina – Walls 9 pass from Collins (Kasay kick)
- Carolina – Safety, Tomczak intentional grounding in end zone
- Pittsburgh – Hastings 6 pass from Tomczak (Johnson kick)
- Pittsburgh – Stewart 80 run (Johnson kick)
- Carolina – FG Kasay 35
- Carolina – FG Kasay 30
- Carolina – FG Kasay 29

=== Standings ===
AFC Central
	W	L	T	PCT	PF	PA	STK
^{(3)} Pittsburgh Steelers	10	6	0	.625	344	257	L2
^{(5)} Jacksonville Jaguars	9	7	0	.563	325	335	W5
Cincinnati Bengals	8	8	0	.500	372	369	W3
Houston Oilers	8	8	0	.500	345	319	W1
Baltimore Ravens	4	12	0	.250	371	441	L3

== Playoffs ==
=== Game summaries ===
==== AFC Wild Card Playoff (Sunday December 29, 1996): vs. Indianapolis Colts ====
	1	2	3	4	Total
Colts	0	14	0	0	14
Steelers	10	3	8	21	42

at Three Rivers Stadium, Pittsburgh, Pennsylvania

- Game time: 12:30 pm EST
- Game weather: 60 °F (16 °C) (Partly Cloudy)
- Game attendance: 58,078
- Referee: Ed Hochuli
- TV announcers: (NBC) Dick Enberg (play by play), Phil Simms & Paul Maguire (color commentators)

Scoring drives:

- Pittsburgh – FG Johnson 29
- Pittsburgh – Stewart 1 run (Johnson kick)
- Pittsburgh – FG Johnson 50
- Indianapolis – Daniel 59 interception return (Blanchard kick)
- Indianapolis – Bailey 9 pass from Harbaugh (Blanchard kick)
- Pittsburgh – Bettis 1 run (Farquhar pass from Stewart)
- Pittsburgh- Bettis 1 run (Johnson kick)
- Pittsburgh – Witman 31 run (Johnson kick)
- Pittsburgh – Stewart 3 run (Johnson kick)

==== AFC Divisional Playoff (Sunday January 5, 1997): at New England Patriots ====
	1	2	3	4	Total
Steelers	0	0	3	0	3
Patriots	14	7	0	7	28

at Foxboro Stadium, Foxborough, Massachusetts

- Game time: 12:30 pm EST
- Game weather: 40 °F (4 °C) (Fog)
- Game attendance: 60,188
- Referee: Bernie Kukar
- TV announcers: (NBC) Marv Albert (play by play), Sam Wyche & Randy Cross (color commentators)

Scoring drives:

- New England – Martin 2 run (Vinatieri kick)
- New England – Byars 34 pass from Bledsoe (Vinatieri kick)
- New England – Martin 78 run (Vinatieri kick)
- Pittsburgh – FG Johnson 29
- New England – Martin 23 run (Vinatieri kick)

== Honors and awards ==
=== Pro Bowl Representatives ===
- No. 26 Rod Woodson-Cornerback
- No. 36 Jerome Bettis-Running Back
- No. 37 Carnell Lake-Safety
- No. 63 Dermontti Dawson-Center
- No. 94 Chad Brown-Outside Linebacker
- No. 99 Levon Kirkland-Inside Linebacker
