= List of Pittsburgh Steelers first-round draft picks =

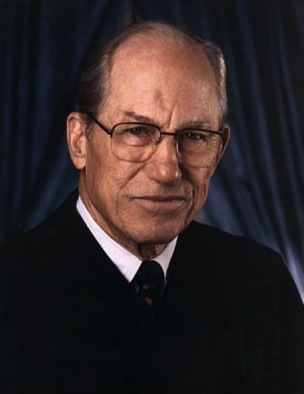
Byron "Whizzer" White was selected fourth overall in the 1938 draft – he went on to serve on the U.S. Supreme Court.

The Pittsburgh Steelers, a professional American football team based in Pittsburgh, Pennsylvania, participated in the first NFL draft prior to the 1936 season. The franchise changed its name to the Steelers prior to the 1940 season, to represent the city's heritage of producing steel.

The event, which is officially known as the "Player Selection Meeting", is held each April. The draft is used as the primary means to distribute newly available talent (primarily from college football) equitably amongst the teams. Selections are made in reverse order based on the previous season's record, i.e. the club with the worst record from the previous season selects first. Through 2009, only two exceptions were made to this order: the Super Bowl champion always selects last (32nd), and the Super Bowl loser is awarded the penultimate (31st) pick. Beginning in 2010, teams making the playoffs will be seeded in reverse order depending upon how far they advance. The draft consists of seven rounds. Teams have the option of trading selections for players, cash and/or other selections (including future year selections). Thus, it is not uncommon for a team's actual draft pick to differ from their assigned draft pick, or for a team to have extra or no draft picks in any round due to these trades. The Steelers have traded away their first-round pick eight times; they have had two first-round selections in two drafts.

The Steelers' first selection in the inaugural NFL draft was William Shakespeare, a halfback from Notre Dame. The Steelers have selected first overall three times, drafting Bill Dudley in 1942, Gary Glick in 1956 and Terry Bradshaw in 1970. The team has selected second overall once, and third overall four times. Through 2023, ten Steeler first-round picks have gone on to have playing careers deemed worthy of enshrinement into the Pro Football Hall of Fame: Terry Bradshaw, Len Dawson, Bill Dudley, Alan Faneca, Joe Greene, Franco Harris, Bobby Layne, Troy Polamalu, Lynn Swann, and Rod Woodson. The team's most recent first-round selection was Max Iheanachor, an offensive tackle from Arizona State University.

== Key ==
Position Key
Abbreviation	Position	Abbreviation	Position	Abbreviation	Position
B	Back	K	Kicker	NT	Nose tackle
C	Center	LB	Linebacker	FB	Fullback
DB	Defensive back	P	Punter	HB	Halfback
DE	Defensive end	QB	Quarterback	WR	Wide receiver
DT	Defensive tackle	RB	Running back	G	Guard
E	End	T	Offensive tackle	TE	Tight end

Symbol Key
Symbol	Meaning
^	Member of the Pro Football Hall of Fame
*	Selected number one overall
†	Selected for the Pro Bowl at any time in their career
—	No draft pick that year
Year	Each year links to an article about that particular NFL Draft
Pick	Number of the pick within the first round
Position	Position of the player
College	Attended college

== Player selections ==
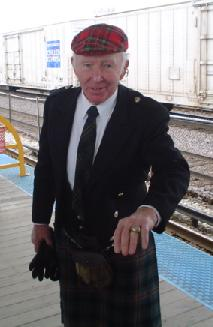
1954 first-round selection Johnny Lattner played only a single NFL season.

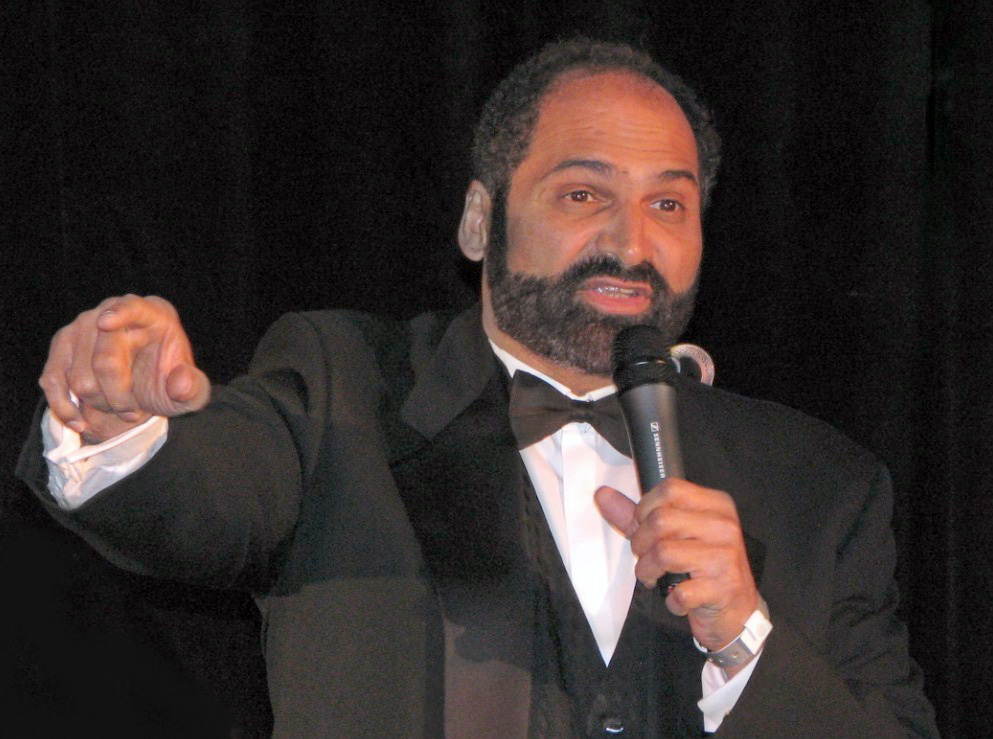
Franco Harris caught the "Immaculate Reception" in the 1972 NFL Playoffs.

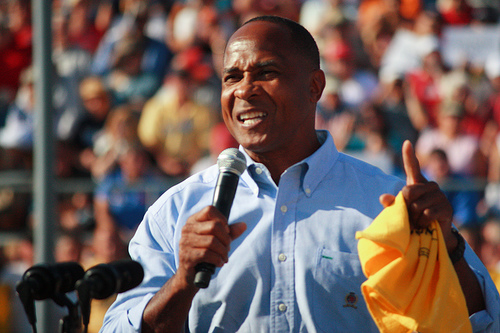
Lynn Swann, drafted in 1974, was elected to the Pro Football Hall of Fame in 2001.

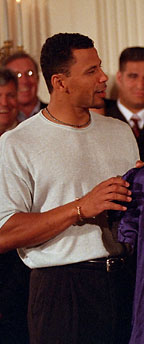
Rod Woodson, drafted in 1987, was elected to the Pro Football Hall of Fame in 2009.

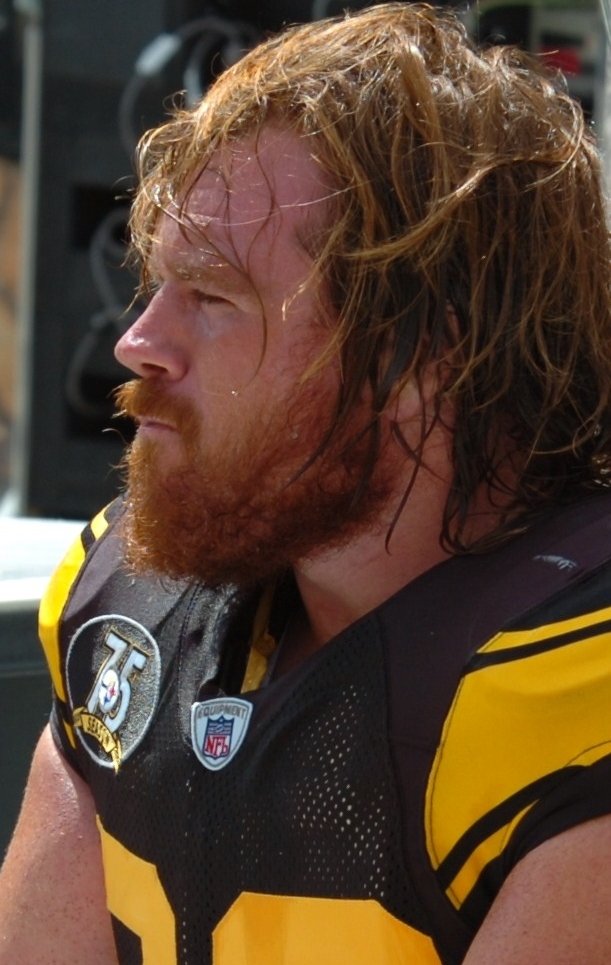
Alan Faneca was a 5-time All-Pro for the Steelers after being drafted in 1998.

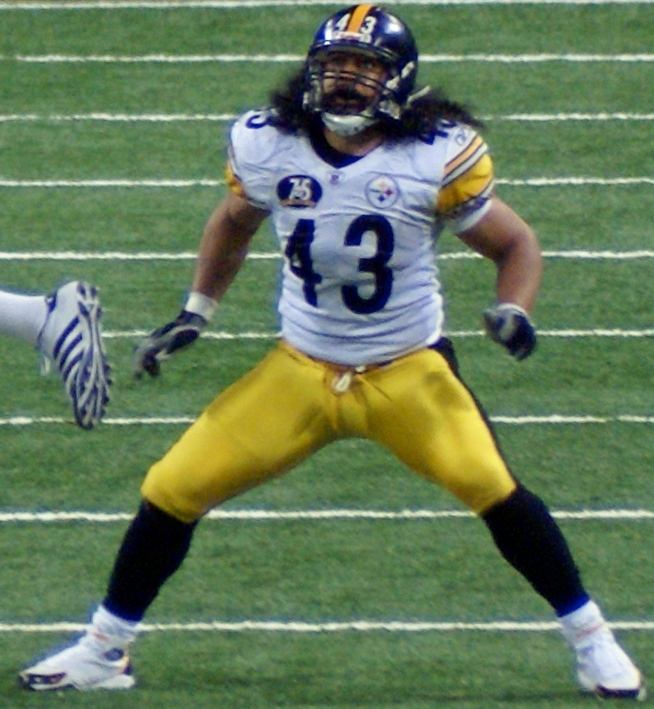
Troy Polamalu made the Pro Bowl six consecutive years from 2004 to 2009, and was Defensive Player of the Year in 2010.

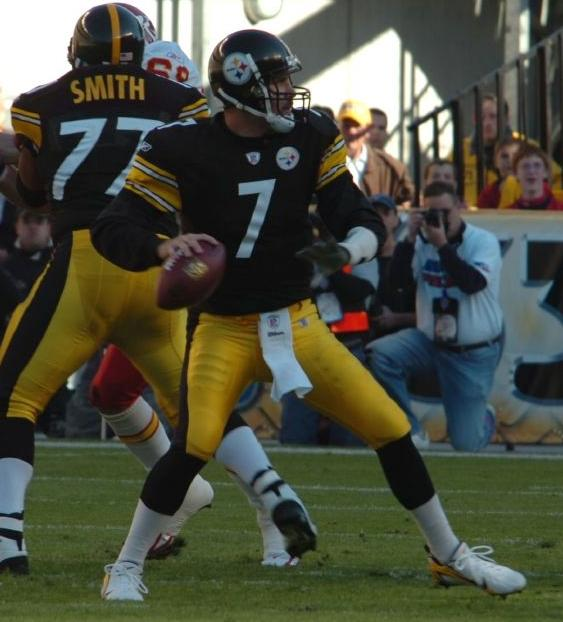
Drafted in 2004, Ben Roethlisberger became the youngest quarterback to win a Super Bowl in 2005 at the age of 23.

Pittsburgh Steelers first-round draft picks
Year	Pick	Player name	Position	College	Notes
1936	3	William Shakespeare	RB	Notre Dame	
1937	5	Mike Basrak	RB	Duquesne	
1938	4	Byron White	RB	Colorado	
1939	–	No pick	–	–	^{[a]}
1940	3	Kay Eakin	RB	Arkansas	
1941	–	No pick	–	–	^{[b]}
1942	1	Bill Dudley*†	RB	Virginia	
1943	7	Bill Daley	FB	Minnesota	
1944	10	Johnny Podesto	RB	St. Mary's (CA)	
1945	2	Paul Duhart	RB	Florida	
1946	3	Doc Blanchard	FB	Army	
1947	5	Hub Bechtol	WR	Texas	
1948	3	Bobby Layne†	QB	Texas	^{[p]}
1948	9	Dan Edwards	WR	Georgia	
1949	6	Bobby Gage	RB	Clemson	
1950	8	Lynn Chandnois	RB	Michigan State	
1951	9	Butch Avinger	FB	Alabama	
1952	6	Ed Modzelewski	FB	Maryland	
1953	5	Ted Marchibroda	QB	Detroit	
1954	7	Johnny Lattner	RB	Notre Dame	
1955	6	Frank Varrichione	OT	Notre Dame	
1956	1	Gary Glick*	DB	Colorado State	^{[c]}
1956	5	Art Davis	RB	Mississippi State	
1957	5	Len Dawson†	QB	Purdue	
1958	–	No pick	–	–	^{[d]}
1959	–	No pick	–	–	^{[e]}
1960	6	Jack Spikes	FB	TCU	
1961	–	No pick	–	–	^{[f]}
1962	5	Bob Ferguson	RB	Ohio State	
1963	–	No pick	–	–	^{[g]}
1964	10	Paul Martha	RB	Pittsburgh	
1965	–	No pick	–	–	^{[h]}
1966	3	Dick Leftridge	RB	WVU	
1967	–	No pick	–	–	^{[i]}
1968	10	Mike Taylor	OT	USC	
1969	4	Joe Greene†	DT	North Texas	
1970	1	Terry Bradshaw*†	QB	Louisiana Tech	
1971	8	Frank Lewis	WR	Grambling	
1972	13	Franco Harris†	RB	Penn State	
1973	24	J. T. Thomas	DB	Florida State	
1974	21	Lynn Swann†	WR	USC	
1975	26	Dave Brown	DB	Michigan	
1976	28	Bennie Cunningham	TE	Clemson	
1977	21	Robin Cole	LB	New Mexico	
1978	22	Ron Johnson	DB	Eastern Michigan	
1979	28	Greg Hawthorne	RB	Baylor	
1980	28	Mark Malone	QB	Arizona State	
1981	17	Keith Gary	DE	Oklahoma	
1982	12	Walter Abercrombie	RB	Baylor	
1983	21	Gabriel Rivera	DE	Texas Tech	
1984	23	Louis Lipps	WR	Southern Mississippi	
1985	20	Darryl Sims	DE	Wisconsin	
1986	9	John Rienstra	G	Temple	
1987	10	Rod Woodson†	DB	Purdue	
1988	18	Aaron Jones	DE	Eastern Kentucky	
1989	7	Tim Worley	RB	Georgia	
1989	24	Tom Ricketts	OT	Pittsburgh	^{[j]}
1990	21	Eric Green	TE	Liberty	^{[k]}
1991	15	Huey Richardson	DE	Florida	
1992	11	Leon Searcy	OT	Miami	
1993	23	Deon Figures	DB	Colorado	
1994	17	Charles Johnson	WR	Colorado	
1995	27	Mark Bruener	TE	Washington	
1996	29	Jamain Stephens	OT	North Carolina A&T	
1997	24	Chad Scott	DB	Maryland	
1998	26	Alan Faneca†	G	LSU	
1999	13	Troy Edwards	WR	Louisiana Tech	
2000	8	Plaxico Burress	WR	Michigan State	
2001	19	Casey Hampton	DT	Texas	^{[l]}
2002	30	Kendall Simmons	G	Auburn	
2003	16	Troy Polamalu†	DB	USC	^{[m]}
2004	11	Ben Roethlisberger	QB	Miami (OH)	
2005	30	Heath Miller	TE	Virginia	
2006	25	Santonio Holmes	WR	Ohio State	^{[n]}
2007	15	Lawrence Timmons	LB	Florida State	
2008	23	Rashard Mendenhall	RB	Illinois	
2009	32	Evander Hood	DT	Missouri	
2010	18	Maurkice Pouncey	C	Florida	
2011	31	Cameron Heyward	DE	Ohio State	
2012	24	David DeCastro	G	Stanford	
2013	17	Jarvis Jones	LB	Georgia	
2014	15	Ryan Shazier	LB	Ohio State	
2015	22	Bud Dupree	LB	Kentucky	
2016	25	Artie Burns	CB	Miami	
2017	30	T. J. Watt	LB	Wisconsin	
2018	28	Terrell Edmunds	S	Virginia Tech	
2019	10	Devin Bush	LB	Michigan	
2020	–	No pick	–	–	^{[o]}
2021	24	Najee Harris	RB	Alabama	
2022	20	Kenny Pickett	QB	Pittsburgh	
2023	14	Broderick Jones	OT	Georgia	
2024	20	Troy Fautanu	OT	Washington	
2025	21	Derrick Harmon	DT	Oregon	
2026	21	Max Iheanachor	OT	Arizona State	

== Notes ==
- ^{a} The Steelers traded their 1939 pick (2nd overall) to the Chicago Bears.
- ^{b} The Steelers traded their 1941 pick (3rd overall) to the Chicago Bears (3rd overall)
- ^{c} This was a lottery bonus pick.
- ^{d} The Steelers traded their 1958 pick (8th overall) to the San Francisco 49ers.
- ^{e} The Steelers traded their 1959 pick (8th overall) to the San Francisco 49ers.
- ^{f} The Steelers traded their 1961 pick (6th overall) to the San Francisco 49ers.
- ^{g} The Steelers traded their 1963 pick (11th overall) to the Chicago Bears.
- ^{h} The Steelers traded their 1965 pick (3rd overall) to the Chicago Bears.
- ^{i} The Steelers traded their 1967 pick (9th overall) to the Green Bay Packers.
- ^{j} The Steelers acquired the 1989 pick (24th overall) from the Minnesota Vikings.
- ^{k} The Steelers traded their 1990 pick (17th overall) to the Dallas Cowboys for Dallas' 1990 pick (21st overall, obtained from Minnesota Vikings) and a third-round pick (82nd overall, obtained from San Francisco 49ers).
- ^{l} The Steelers traded their 2001 pick (16th overall) to the New York Jets for their first-round pick (19th overall), their fourth-round pick (111th overall) and their sixth-round pick (181st overall).
- ^{m} The Steelers traded their first-round pick (27th overall), third-round pick (92nd overall) and sixth-round pick (200th overall) to obtain the 2003 pick (16th overall).
- ^{n} The Steelers obtained the 2006 pick from New York Giants by trading their first-round pick (32nd overall), their third-round pick (96th overall) and their fourth-round pick (129th overall).
- ^{o} The Steelers traded their 2020 pick (18th overall) to the Miami Dolphins to acquire Minkah Fitzpatrick.
- ^{p} The Steelers drafted Bobby Layne but immediately traded him to the Chicago Bears.
