= Kordell Stewart =

American football player (born 1972)

- Stewart with the Pittsburgh Steelers in 2002

No. 10
- Position: Quarterback

Personal information
- Born: October 16, 1972 (age 54); Marrero, Louisiana, U.S.
- Listed height: 6 ft 1 in (1.85 m)
- Listed weight: 218 lb (99 kg)

Career information
- High school: John Ehret (Marrero)
- College: Colorado (1991–1994)
- NFL draft: 1995: 2nd round, 60th overall pick

Career history
- Pittsburgh Steelers (1995–2002); Chicago Bears (2003); Baltimore Ravens (2004–2005)

Awards and highlights
- Pro Bowl (2001); Second-team All-American (1994); First-team All-Big Eight (1994); Second-team All-Big Eight (1992)

Career NFL statistics
- Passing attempts: 2,358
- Passing completions: 1,316
- Completion percentage: 55.8%
- TD–INT: 77–84
- Passing yards: 14,746
- Passer rating: 70.7
- Rushing yards: 2,874
- Rushing touchdowns: 38
- Stats at Pro Football Reference

Kordell Stewart (born October 16, 1972) is an American former professional football quarterback who played in the National Football League (NFL) for 11 seasons, primarily with the Pittsburgh Steelers. Nicknamed "Slash", he played college football for the Colorado Buffaloes and achieved recognition in 1994 for the "Miracle at Michigan", a Hail Mary pass he completed to defeat the Michigan Wolverines. Stewart also received second-team All-American and first-team All-Big Eight honors during the year. He was selected by the Steelers in the second round of the 1995 NFL draft.

Stewart held a variety of roles for the Steelers before becoming their starting quarterback in 1997, which saw him help guide the team to an AFC Championship Game appearance. His most successful season was in 2001 when he led Pittsburgh to the conference's top seed and a return to the conference championship, while earning Pro Bowl honors. Stewart's performance declined the following year, resulting in him being released by the Steelers. Afterwards, Stewart played one season for the Chicago Bears and held a backup role during two seasons with the Baltimore Ravens. He ranks eighth in quarterback rushing touchdowns at 38.

== Early life ==
Kordell Stewart was born in New Orleans, Louisiana. He attended John Ehret High School in Jefferson Parish, Louisiana.

== College career ==
In 1991, Stewart received a scholarship to the University of Colorado Boulder. Playing under coach Bill McCartney, he became one of the most prolific quarterbacks in school history, setting several Buffaloes records, including most passes completed, most passing yards, and most touchdown passes.

Stewart led the option-oriented Buffaloes to a pair of top-10 regular-season finishes in the AP and Coaches polls in 1992 and 1994 as well as wins in the 1993 Aloha Bowl and 1995 Fiesta Bowl. He was selected as a second-team All-American his senior year as nationally ranked No. 3 Colorado finished 11–1 in 1994.

One of his greatest moments for the Colorado Buffaloes occurred in the beginning of his college career. On September 5, 1992, Stewart started his first game as a sophomore as Colorado unveiled a pass-oriented offense that lifted the 12th-ranked Buffaloes past in-state rival Colorado State, 37–17. Stewart connected on 21 of 36 passes for a then school-record 409 yards and four touchdowns in the contest.

On September 24, 1994, Stewart threw the game-winning, 64-yard Hail Mary touchdown pass into the end zone to wide receiver Michael Westbrook in the closing seconds to beat the Michigan Wolverines.

== Professional career ==
Pre-draft measurables
Height	Weight	Arm length	Hand span	40-yard dash	10-yard split	20-yard split	20-yard shuttle	Vertical jump	Broad jump
6 ft 1 1/2 in (1.87 m)	212 lb (96 kg)	31 1/2 in (0.80 m)	9 1/2 in (0.24 m)	4.52 s	1.60 s	2.68 s	4.13 s	36.0 in (0.91 m)	10 ft 5 in (3.18 m)
All values from NFL Combine

=== Pittsburgh Steelers ===
==== 1995–1996 ====
Stewart was used sparingly for select plays. In his first season, he had 15 carries with 14 receptions (for a total of two touchdowns) while making a handshake deal with Bill Cowher to be given a chance for the quarterback position, as Neil O'Donnell was the incumbent and also slated to be a free agent after the 1995 season was over. After a few games of brief rushes and catches, he got his first pass attempt against the Cleveland Browns. The attempt resulted in a touchdown. In total, he threw seven passes that year.

In the 1996 playoffs, he was used for a couple of carries (nine combined) in Pittsburgh's run to Super Bowl XXX. Against Buffalo, he was used for a punt, which he kicked 41 yards to the endzone for a touchback. In the AFC Championship against the Indianapolis Colts, he caught two passes for 18 yards and a touchdown that gave Pittsburgh a 10–6 lead at halftime in an eventual win. He ran four times for 15 yards in the Super Bowl loss to the Dallas Cowboys, which proved to be his only trip to the big game. He is the only rookie in NFL history to take a snap at the quarterback position in a Super Bowl; in which he converted a 4th & 1 on a quarterback sneak.

In 1996, Pittsburgh elected to use third-year backup Jim Miller as their week one starter. When he fizzled out in the middle of the game, they went with Mike Tomczak (who had been with Pittsburgh since 1993), with the Steelers being bolstered by their off-season trade acquisition of Jerome Bettis. Stewart played sparingly at quarterback (30 passes) while being more used for catches and runs. He rushed 39 times (his longest play being an 80-yard touchdown run versus Carolina) and caught 17 passes for a combined total of eight touchdowns. In the 1997 playoffs, he ran nine times for 48 yards against the Colts for two touchdowns.

==== 1997 ====
Stewart was named the starting quarterback for the 1997 season. In his first season as a starting quarterback in the NFL, he led the Steelers to an 11–5 record. He was the first quarterback to throw for twenty touchdowns and run for ten in history. The Steelers went to the AFC Championship Game, which they lost to the Denver Broncos. Stewart threw three interceptions (two of which were made in the opposing Denver end zone), and lost a fumble accounting for all four Steeler turnovers in a 24–21 loss.

==== 1998–1999 ====
Prior to the 1998 season, the Steelers lost their offensive coordinator, Chan Gailey as he was signed as the Cowboys head coach. To replace him, the Steelers brought in Ray Sherman from the Vikings. In addition, Stewart's leading receiver and Pro Bowler Yancey Thigpen also left via free agency after the 1997 season. By mid-season in 1998, the Steelers had lost three of the five starting offensive linemen from the 1997 AFC Championship game and, as a result, Stewart and the Steelers offense struggled and failed to make the playoffs in both seasons.

==== 2000 ====
Coach Bill Cowher named Kent Graham quarterback to start the season, and the team got off to a 1–3 start. When Graham injured his hip, Stewart was tapped to replace him. The team finished 9–7 and missed the playoffs by one game.

==== 2001 ====
As starting quarterback, Stewart led the 2001 Steelers to a 13–3 regular-season record and the top seed in the AFC playoffs. Under the tutelage of new QB coach Tom Clements and new offensive coordinator Mike Mularkey, Stewart had his best year as a pro, throwing for over 3,000 yards, completing 60 percent of his passes, and attaining a passer rating of 81.7. He threw for 14 TDs and ran for five more. Stewart was elected to the Pro Bowl and was named the Steelers MVP.

The Steelers easily defeated the then-defending Super Bowl champion Baltimore Ravens in the divisional playoffs. The eventual Super Bowl champion New England Patriots defeated the Steelers in the AFC Championship Game.

==== 2002 ====
Stewart began the 2002 season as the Steelers' starting quarterback, but after throwing an interception into double coverage in the end zone at home against the Cleveland Browns in the third game of the season, he was replaced by increasingly popular backup Tommy Maddox, and Stewart was released at the end of the season. Stewart did start two games in place of an injured Maddox to keep the team's playoff hopes alive. Maddox returned, and Stewart never played in Pittsburgh again.

=== Chicago Bears ===
The following season, Stewart signed as a free agent with the Chicago Bears and was named the starter. After several poor performances in 2003, he was replaced in favor of Chris Chandler. After getting the same results from Chandler, he was reinserted as the starter, before getting benched in favor of rookie Rex Grossman after the Bears were eliminated from the playoffs. Stewart was released at the end of the season.

=== Baltimore Ravens ===
Stewart was signed in 2004 by the Ravens to play a backup role to Kyle Boller, and later served as a replacement for the injured Anthony Wright. He did not, however, throw a pass that season. He was unexpectedly successful as an emergency replacement for punter Dave Zastudil, being named NFL Special Teams Player of the Week for his performance. He was released following the 2004 season, but due to an injury to starting quarterback Kyle Boller during Week #1 of the 2005 season, the Ravens once again signed Stewart to be a backup to Anthony Wright.

== Nickname and legacy ==
Pittsburgh Steelers color commentator Myron Cope gave Stewart the nickname "Slash". He chose this name under the presumption that Stewart could play multiple positions—quarterback/receiver/rusher (quarterback "slash" receiver "slash" rusher).

After confining him to many utility roles during the 1995 season, when the Steelers made it to Super Bowl XXX only to lose to the Dallas Cowboys, the team gave Stewart the opportunity to compete for the starting quarterback position in 1996. Following a preseason battle, Bill Cowher named Jim Miller as the Steelers' starting quarterback and kept Stewart in his "Slash" role. Miller struggled at Jacksonville on opening day and was replaced by Mike Tomczak for the rest of the season. In a December 1996 game against the Carolina Panthers, Stewart set a then-NFL record for longest touchdown run by a quarterback with an 80-yard rush.

While criticized often during his career (especially by the local media in Pittsburgh), more recent assessments of Stewart's career have been more positive. Some sportswriters have named Stewart the first modern dual-threat quarterback, having played the position about 20 years before it became widespread. While Stewart wasn't the first such quarterback – notably, Fran Tarkenton, Randall Cunningham and Steve Young were known to scramble while John Elway also ran the ball often (all except Cunningham are now in the Pro Football Hall of Fame) – Stewart was one of the first to run with the football as a form of offense as opposed to avoid defenders.

Within the local Pittsburgh media Mark Madden played a big part in the Stewart rumors having substance. John Steigerwald often defended Stewart during his playing career and felt he was being unfairly judged. Longtime Pittsburgh Post-Gazette writer Ron Cook would acknowledge years later that Stewart deserved better treatment during his time with the Steelers. Stewart's performance has him ranked occasionally as the team's 3rd best quarterback of all-time behind Ben Roethlisberger (Stewart's more long-term successor who was drafted a year after Stewart was released) and Terry Bradshaw, ahead of Hall of Famer Bobby Layne.

== Career statistics ==
Legend
**Bold**	Career high

=== NFL ===
Year	Team	Games			Passing							Rushing				Receiving			
Year	Team	GP	GS	Record	Cmp	Att	Pct	Yds	TD	Int	Rtg	Att	Yds	Avg	TD	Rec	Yds	Avg	TD
1995	PIT	10	2	—	5	7	**71.4**	60	1	0	**136.9**	15	86	**5.7**	1	14	235	16.8	1
1996	PIT	16	2	—	11	30	36.7	100	0	2	18.8	39	171	4.4	5	**17**	**293**	**17.2**	**3**
1997	PIT	16	16	11–5	236	440	53.6	3,020	**21**	17	75.2	88	476	5.4	**11**	0	0	0.0	0
1998	PIT	16	16	7–9	252	**458**	55.0	2,560	11	**18**	62.9	81	406	5.0	2	1	17	17.0	0
1999	PIT	16	12	5–6	160	275	58.2	1,464	6	10	64.9	56	258	4.6	2	9	113	12.6	1
2000	PIT	16	11	7–4	151	289	52.2	1,860	11	8	73.6	78	436	5.6	7	0	0	0.0	0
2001	PIT	16	16	**13–3**	**266**	442	60.2	**3,109**	14	11	81.7	**96**	**537**	5.6	5	0	0	0.0	0
2002	PIT	7	5	3–2	109	166	65.7	1,155	6	6	82.8	43	191	4.4	2	0	0	0.0	0
2003	CHI	9	7	2–5	126	251	50.2	1,418	7	12	56.8	59	290	4.9	3	0	0	0.0	0
2004	BAL	2	0	—	0	0	0.0	0	0	0	0.0	1	−1	−1.0	0	0	0	0.0	0
2005	BAL	1	0	—	0	0	0.0	0	0	0	0.0	4	24	6	0	0	0	0.0	0
Totals		125	87	48–34	1,316	2,358	55.8	14,746	77	84	70.7	560	2,874	5.1	38	41	658	16.0	5

=== College ===
Season	Team	Passing							Rushing			
Season	Team	Cmp	Att	Pct	Yds	TD	Int	Rtg	Att	Yds	Avg	TD
1991	Colorado	1	2	50.0	2	0	0	58.4	18	144	**8.0**	1
1992	Colorado	151	252	59.9	2,109	**12**	**9**	138.8	60	418	6.9	1
1993	Colorado	**157**	**294**	53.4	**2,299**	11	7	126.7	102	524	5.1	6
1994	Colorado	147	237	**62.0**	2,071	10	3	**146.8**	**122**	**639**	5.2	**7**
Totals		456	785	58.1	6,481	33	19	136.5	302	1,725	6.3	15

== Post-NFL career ==
Following Boller's reactivation on November 9, 2005, the Ravens cut Stewart instead of keeping him as a third-string player, activating running back Musa Smith instead. Stewart had no comment following the announcement he had been cut from the team.

Stewart made guest appearances on the TV shows Deal or No Deal and Pros vs. Joes.

On April 29, 2008, in an interview on the WCNN "680 The Fan", Stewart expressed interest in returning to the NFL. Also, according to ESPN2's First Take on July 28, 2008, Stewart had not officially retired and had been working out at his home, to attempt a comeback following pre-season. He later was put into free agency but was never selected by a team.

He appeared in January 2009 as an analyst on ESPN's College Football Live, and then later appeared again in July during the show's "50 States Tour" for the show's episode regarding Colorado athletics.

Stewart was also a sideline reporter for the United Football League and is currently an analyst on various ESPN shows such as NFL Live, NFL 32, Take 2, and Mike and Mike in the Morning.

Stewart officially retired from the NFL in 2012.

In 2025, Stewart accepted a voluntary Offensive Coordinator role with South Forsyth High School in Georgia.

== Personal life ==
Stewart has a son, Syre, with his ex-girlfriend Tania Richardson. Stewart met Porsha Williams in 2009 at downtown Atlanta's Luckie Lounge. On May 21, 2011, they married in a lavish ceremony that was featured on WE tv's Platinum Weddings. Stewart appeared as himself alongside Williams on Bravo's The Real Housewives of Atlanta season 5 and 6. Stewart filed for divorce from Williams on March 22, 2013, on the grounds that the marriage was irretrievably broken. Initial reports stated he was unwilling to pay any spousal support.

In March 2017, Kordell won a $3 million lawsuit against internet personality Andrew Chad Caldwell, who made headlines in 2014 in front of a St. Louis church stating that he was delivered from homosexuality. Andrew Caldwell claimed to have a gay relationship with Kordell. Since the lawsuit, Kordell has still not been paid by Andrew Caldwell. In 2021 on an episode of Tamron Hall, Kordell referenced the incident, which led to Andrew Caldwell going to social media threatening to file a lawsuit against both Tamron Hall and Kordell for mentioning the issue that Andrew Caldwell denies despite evidence that proved he made up the false accusations.

Stewart is an avid golfer and carried a nine handicap when he was an active NFL player.

Stewart was the cover athlete for the 1997 video game NFL Blitz.

On March 23, 1998, Stewart appeared on the first-ever cover of ESPN The Magazine alongside Kobe Bryant, Alex Rodriguez and Eric Lindros.

Stewart later published an essay on The Players' Tribune, detailing the racism and false rumors of homosexuality he faced as the Steelers' quarterback.
