= Paul Wiggins =

Paul Wiggins may refer to:

- Paul Wiggins (American football) (born 1973), American football player
- Paul Wiggins (athlete) (born 1962), Australian wheelchair racer

== See also ==
- Paul Wiggin (1934–2025), American football player and coach
