= Courtney Hawkins (American football) =

American football player and coach (born 1969)

Michigan State Spartans
- Title: Wide receivers coach

Personal information
- Born: December 12, 1969 (age 56); Flint, Michigan, U.S.
- Listed height: 5 ft 9 in (1.75 m)
- Listed weight: 183 lb (83 kg)

Career information
- High school: Beecher (Beecher, Michigan)
- College: Michigan State
- NFL draft: 1992: 2nd round, 44th overall pick

Career history

Playing
- Tampa Bay Buccaneers (1992–1996); Pittsburgh Steelers (1997–2000)

Coaching
- Beecher HS (MI) (2006–2019) Head coach; Michigan State (2020–present) Wide receivers coach

Awards and highlights
- First-team All-Big Ten (1991)

Career NFL statistics
- Receptions: 366
- Receiving yards: 4,573
- Receiving touchdowns: 18
- Stats at Pro Football Reference

Courtney Tyrone Hawkins Jr. (born December 12, 1969) is an American football coach and former player who is currently wide receivers coach for the Michigan State Spartans. He was selected by the Tampa Bay Buccaneers in the second round of the 1992 NFL draft. A 5'9", 190 lbs wide receiver from Michigan State University, Hawkins played in nine NFL seasons from 1992 to 1996 for the Buccaneers and then the Pittsburgh Steelers from 1997 to 2000.

Hawkins is formerly the head coach and athletic director at his alma mater, Beecher High School in Flint, Michigan.

== NFL career statistics ==
Legend
**Bold**	Career high

=== Regular season ===
Year	Team	Games		Receiving				
Year	Team	GP	GS	Rec	Yds	Avg	Lng	TD
1992	TAM	**16**	5	20	336	**16.8**	49	2
1993	TAM	**16**	12	62	**933**	15.0	**67**	**5**
1994	TAM	13	12	37	438	11.8	32	**5**
1995	TAM	**16**	3	41	493	12.0	47	0
1996	TAM	**16**	**16**	46	544	11.8	45	1
1997	PIT	15	3	45	555	12.3	44	3
1998	PIT	15	14	**66**	751	11.4	53	1
1999	PIT	11	11	30	285	9.5	23	0
2000	PIT	13	5	19	238	12.5	33	1
Career		131	81	366	4,573	12.5	67	18

=== Playoffs ===
Year	Team	Games		Receiving				
Year	Team	GP	GS	Rec	Yds	Avg	Lng	TD
1997	PIT	2	0	8	58	7.3	9	0
Career		2	0	8	58	7.3	9	0

== Coaching career ==
On February 19, 2020, Hawkins was hired as the wide receivers coach at Michigan State under new head coach Mel Tucker. Hawkins was the only coach retained on the new coaching staff by newly hired head coach, Jonathan Smith. After the hiring of new head coach Pat Fitzgerald, Hawkins was once again retained as the wide receivers coach at Michigan State. Buffalo Bills wide receiver Keon Coleman credits his skills to Hawkins and his time at Michigan State, despite having finished off his college career with Florida State University. Beyond Coleman, Courtney Hawkins has cemented his place as a coach by producing several other prominent wide receivers, including Jalen Nailor, Jayden Reed, and Nick Marsh, amongst others.
