= Mark Bruener =

American football player and executive (born 1972)

- Bruener with the Pittsburgh Steelers in 2002

No. 87
- Position: Tight end

Personal information
- Born: September 16, 1972 (age 54); Aberdeen, Washington, U.S.
- Listed height: 6 ft 4 in (1.93 m)
- Listed weight: 253 lb (115 kg)

Career information
- High school: J. M. Weatherwax (Aberdeen)
- College: Washington (1991–1994)
- NFL draft: 1995: 1st round, 27th overall pick

Career history

Playing
- Pittsburgh Steelers (1995–2003); Houston Texans (2004–2008)

Operations
- NFL Players Association Executive Committee; Scout

Awards and highlights
- National champion (1991); Third-team All-American (1993); 2× First-team All-Pac-10 (1993, 1994)

Career NFL statistics
- Receptions: 152
- Receiving yards: 1,333
- Receiving touchdowns: 18
- Stats at Pro Football Reference

Mark Frederick Bruener (born September 16, 1972) is an American former professional football player who was a tight end in the National Football League (NFL). He played college football for the Washington Huskies, earning All-American honors in 1993. He was selected by the Pittsburgh Steelers in the first round of the 1995 NFL draft with the 27th overall pick.

Bruener played nine seasons with the Steelers followed by five with the Houston Texans. He retired from playing following the 2008 season. He formerly served on the NFL Players Association Executive Committee. As of 2018, he serves as a scout for the Steelers.

== College career ==
Bruener played at the University of Washington from 1991 to 1994 and proved himself as a reliable receiver and willing blocker in the running game.

- 1991: 5 catches for 57 yards.
- 1992: 21 catches for 210 yards.
- 1993: 30 catches for 414 yards with 3 TD.
- 1994: 34 catches for 331 yards with 1 TD.

== Professional career ==
Pre-draft measurables
| Height | Weight | Arm length | Hand span | 40-yard dash | 10-yard split | 20-yard split | 20-yard shuttle | Vertical jump | Broad jump | Bench press |
|---|---|---|---|---|---|---|---|---|---|---|
| 6 ft 4 1/2 in (1.94 m) | 249 lb (113 kg) | 32 1/2 in (0.83 m) | 9 3/4 in (0.25 m) | 4.89 s | 1.69 s | 2.81 s | 4.19 s | 34.0 in (0.86 m) | 9 ft 8 in (2.95 m) | 22 reps |

Bruener was drafted in the first round with the 27th overall pick in the 1995 NFL draft by the Pittsburgh Steelers. He played with the Steelers for nine seasons before signing with the Houston Texans. Bruener was primarily a blocking tight end rather than a pass-catcher, and finished his NFL career with 152 catches.

== NFL career statistics ==
Legend
| **Bold** | Career high |

=== Regular season ===
| Year | Team | Games | | Receiving | | | | | |
| Year | Team | GP | GS | Tgt | Rec | Yds | Avg | Lng | TD |
|---|---|---|---|---|---|---|---|---|---|
| 1995 | PIT | **16** | 13 | **48** | **26** | **238** | 9.2 | 29 | 3 |
| 1996 | PIT | 12 | 12 | 24 | 12 | 141 | 11.8 | **36** | 0 |
| 1997 | PIT | **16** | **16** | 30 | 18 | 117 | 6.5 | 18 | **6** |
| 1998 | PIT | **16** | **16** | 33 | 19 | 157 | 8.3 | 20 | 2 |
| 1999 | PIT | 14 | 14 | 34 | 18 | 176 | 9.8 | 29 | 0 |
| 2000 | PIT | **16** | **16** | 34 | 17 | 192 | 11.3 | 30 | 3 |
| 2001 | PIT | 9 | 9 | 19 | 12 | 98 | 8.2 | 21 | 0 |
| 2002 | PIT | 12 | 12 | 18 | 13 | 66 | 5.1 | 10 | 1 |
| 2003 | PIT | 14 | 0 | 6 | 2 | 12 | 6.0 | 11 | 1 |
| 2004 | HOU | **16** | 11 | 10 | 4 | 52 | **13.0** | 27 | 0 |
| 2005 | HOU | **16** | 15 | 4 | 2 | 22 | 11.0 | 19 | 0 |
| 2006 | HOU | 15 | 4 | 10 | 9 | 62 | 6.9 | 25 | 2 |
| 2007 | HOU | 14 | 1 | 1 | 0 | 0 | 0 | 0 | 0 |
| 2008 | HOU | 2 | 0 | 0 | 0 | 0 | 0 | 0 | 0 |
| | | 188 | 139 | 271 | 152 | 1,333 | 8.8 | 36 | 18 |

=== Playoffs ===
| Year | Team | Games | | Receiving | | | | | |
| Year | Team | GP | GS | Tgt | Rec | Yds | Avg | Lng | TD |
|---|---|---|---|---|---|---|---|---|---|
| 1995 | PIT | **3** | **3** | **6** | **1** | 6 | 6.0 | 6 | 0 |
| 1997 | PIT | 2 | 2 | 3 | **1** | **16** | **16.0** | **16** | 0 |
| | | 5 | 5 | 9 | 2 | 22 | 11.0 | 16 | 0 |

== Personal life ==
Bruener and his wife Traci live in Washington with their two daughters, Allie and Chloe, and three sons, Carson, Braydon, and Hudson. Bruener is Catholic. His son Carson played college football for the Washington Huskies and currently plays for the Pittsburgh Steelers.
