= Yancey Thigpen =

American football player (born 1969)

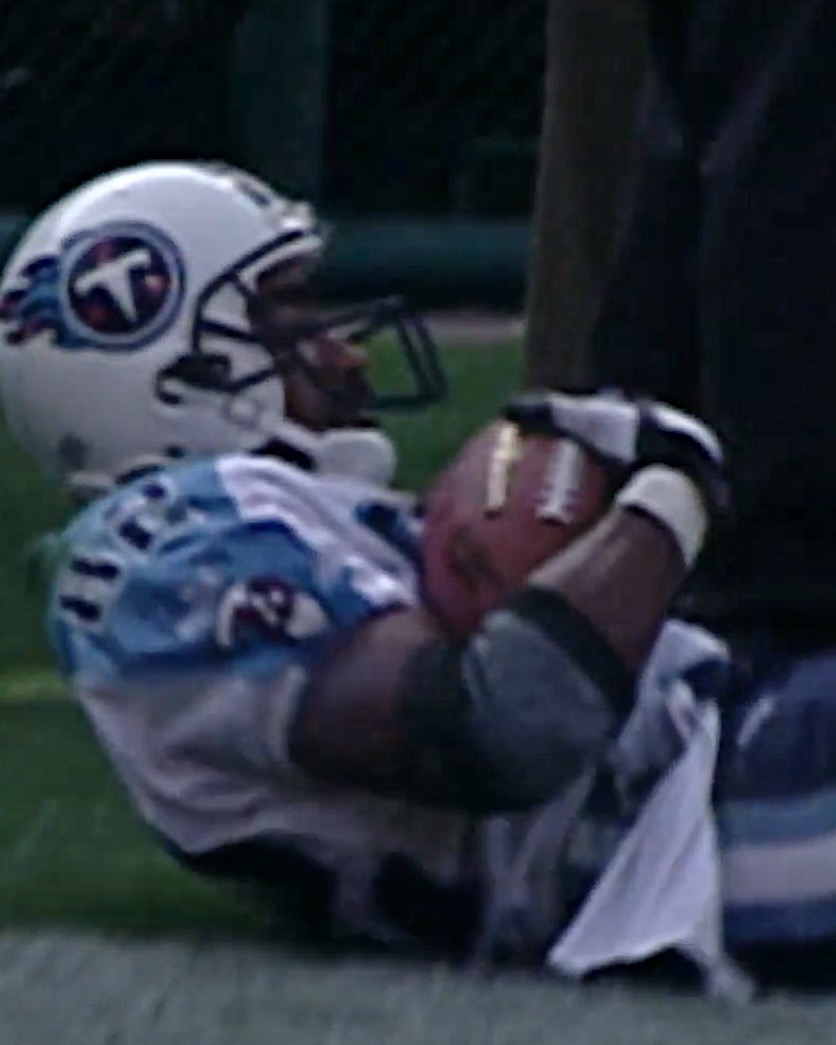
- Thigpen with the Tennessee Titans

No. 84, 82
- Position: Wide receiver

Personal information
- Born: August 15, 1969 (age 57); Tarboro, North Carolina, U.S.
- Listed height: 6 ft 1 in (1.85 m)
- Listed weight: 208 lb (94 kg)

Career information
- High school: Southwest Edgecombe (Pinetops, North Carolina)
- College: Winston-Salem State (1988–1990)
- NFL draft: 1991: 4th round, 90th overall pick

Career history
- San Diego Chargers (1991); Pittsburgh Steelers (1992–1997); Tennessee Oilers / Titans (1998–2000)

Awards and highlights
- 2× Second-team All-Pro (1995, 1997); 2× Pro Bowl (1995, 1997)

Career NFL statistics
- Receptions: 313
- Receiving yards: 5,081
- Receiving touchdowns: 30
- Stats at Pro Football Reference

Yancey Dirk Thigpen (born August 15, 1969) is an American former professional football player who was a wide receiver in the National Football League (NFL) for the San Diego Chargers (1991), Pittsburgh Steelers (1992–1997), the Tennessee Oilers/Titans (1998–2000). Before his NFL career, he played for Winston-Salem State University, where he also played collegiate basketball.

== Professional career ==
Thigpen was selected in the fourth round of the 1991 NFL draft by the San Diego Chargers. Thigpen played infrequently in his first three seasons, but had a breakout year in 1994, catching 36 passes for 546 yards. Then in 1995, he made the Pro Bowl, catching 85 passes for 1,307 yards and five touchdowns, and assisting his team to Super Bowl XXX, where he recorded three catches for 19 yards and a touchdown in the Steelers 27–17 loss to the Dallas Cowboys. His tough style of play earned him the nickname "Meatball," which was later changed to "Phil" when he joined the Oilers in 1998. His role with the Steelers, over time, would eventually be filled by Hines Ward.

Thigpen played only six games in the following season due to injuries, but made a full recovery in the 1997 season, catching 79 passes for 1,398 yards and 7 touchdowns and making his second Pro Bowl selection.

In 1998, he signed a five-year, $21 million contract with the Oilers, which at the time was the highest known contract ever signed among wide receivers. He went on to play with them for the final three seasons of his career, assisting the team (now known as the Titans) to Super Bowl XXXIV in the 1999 season. Such a large contract for a wide receiver was a signal of the role which wide receivers would begin to play in the NFL. Thigpen retired after the 2000 season with 313 career receptions for 5,081 yards and 30 touchdowns. He also rushed for four yards, returned two punts for 30 yards, and gained 188 yards on eight kickoff returns.

== NFL career statistics ==
Legend
	Led the league
**Bold**	Career high

=== Regular season ===
Year	Team	Games		Receiving				
Year	Team	GP	GS	Rec	Yds	Avg	Lng	TD
1991	SD	4	1	0	0	0.0	0	0
1992	PIT	12	0	1	2	2.0	2	0
1993	PIT	12	0	9	154	17.1	39	3
1994	PIT	15	6	36	546	15.2	60	4
1995	PIT	16	16	**85**	1,307	15.4	43	5
1996	PIT	6	2	12	244	**20.3**	39	2
1997	PIT	16	15	79	**1,398**	17.7	**69**	**7**
1998	TEN	9	8	38	493	13.0	55	3
1999	TEN	10	10	38	648	17.1	35	4
2000	TEN	12	0	15	289	19.3	56	2
Career		112	58	313	5,081	16.2	69	30
