= Jamain Stephens =

American football player (born 1974)

No. 67, 75
- Position: Offensive tackle

Personal information
- Born: January 9, 1974 (age 52); Lumberton, North Carolina, U.S.
- Listed height: 6 ft 6 in (1.98 m)
- Listed weight: 336 lb (152 kg)

Career information
- High school: Lumberton
- College: North Carolina A&T
- NFL draft: 1996: 1st round, 29th overall pick

Career history
- Pittsburgh Steelers (1997–1998); Cincinnati Bengals (1999–2002); Denver Broncos (2004)*
- * Offseason or practice squad member only

Career NFL statistics
- Games played: 40
- Games started: 15
- Stats at Pro Football Reference

Jamain Stephens (born January 9, 1974) is an American former professional football player who was an offensive tackle in the National Football League (NFL) for the Pittsburgh Steelers and Cincinnati Bengals.

== Professional career ==
=== Pittsburgh Steelers ===
After his college career for North Carolina A&T, the Pittsburgh Steelers selected him in the first round (29th overall) in the 1996 NFL draft. With the size (6'6), the Steelers selected him as a "project" player and projected him to be a starting tackle with several years of development.

Despite the lofty expectations placed on him by the Steelers, Stephens' career with the Steelers was marred by mediocrity and a poor work ethic on Stephens' part. Despite his lack of development, he managed to start ten games (he played in 11) for the Steelers in the 1998 season, beating out Paul Wiggins for the starting right tackle job in training camp.

Stephens is infamously known by Steelers fans for an incident that occurred on July 30, 1999 the first day of Steelers training camp. That day, a visibly out-of-shape Stephens (he appeared to be 20 pounds over his listed weight of 330 pounds) failed to complete a series of 40-yard runs that were traditional on the first day of camp under Bill Cowher. He nearly collapsed after the 11th of 14 scheduled runs, then barely walked through the remaining ones. Cowher was so disgusted by this embarrassing display that he cut Stephens hours later.

=== Cincinnati Bengals ===
Stephens was promptly signed by the rival Cincinnati Bengals after the Steelers cut him. Stephens played with the Bengals from 1999 to 2002, but was released soon after Marvin Lewis became head coach.

== Personal life ==
Jamain Stephens married Natisha (Melchor) Stephens on July 29, 2020, in Greensboro, North Carolina.

On September 8, 2020, Jamain's son, Jamain Stephens Jr. died from complications associated with COVID-19 at age 20. His son played college football at California University of Pennsylvania.
