= Randy Fuller (American football) =

American football player (born 1970)

No. 24, 29, 21
- Position: Cornerback

Personal information
- Born: June 2, 1970 (age 56); Griffin, Georgia, U.S.
- Listed height: 5 ft 10 in (1.78 m)
- Listed weight: 180 lb (82 kg)

Career information
- High school: William H. Spencer (Columbus, Georgia)
- College: Tennessee State
- NFL draft: 1994: 4th round, 123rd overall pick

Career history
- Denver Broncos (1994); Pittsburgh Steelers (1995–1997); Atlanta Falcons (1998); Seattle Seahawks (1999)

Career NFL statistics
- Tackles: 83
- Sacks: 3
- Interceptions: 1
- Stats at Pro Football Reference

Randy Fuller (born June 2, 1970) is an American former professional football player who was a cornerback for six seasons in the National Football League (NFL) for the Denver Broncos, Pittsburgh Steelers. Atlanta Falcons, and Seattle Seahawks. He played college football for the Tennessee State Tigers and was selected by the Broncos in the fourth round of the 1994 NFL draft. He is known for breaking up the "Hail Mary" pass from Jim Harbaugh intended for Aaron Bailey in the 1995 AFC Championship Game to secure the Steelers victory, sending them to their fifth Super Bowl (XXX), and their first in 16 years.
