= Chad Scott =

American football player (born 1974)

No. 30
- Position: Cornerback

Personal information
- Born: September 6, 1974 (age 52); Capitol Heights, Maryland, U.S.
- Listed height: 6 ft 1 in (1.85 m)
- Listed weight: 205 lb (93 kg)

Career information
- High school: Suitland (Suitland, Maryland)
- College: Towson (1992–1994); Maryland (1995–1996)
- NFL draft: 1997: 1st round, 24th overall pick

Career history
- Pittsburgh Steelers (1997–2004); New England Patriots (2005–2007)

Career NFL statistics
- Total tackles: 466
- Forced fumbles: 1
- Fumble recoveries: 2
- Passes defended: 79
- Interceptions: 21
- Defensive touchdowns: 4
- Stats at Pro Football Reference

Chad Oliver Scott (born September 6, 1974) is an American former professional football player who was a cornerback in the National Football League (NFL) for eleven seasons. Scott was a first round pick, 24th overall, by the Pittsburgh Steelers in the 1997 NFL draft. He also played for the New England Patriots. He played college football for the Maryland Terrapins.

== Early life ==
Scott was born in Capitol Heights, Maryland and graduated from Suitland High School in Forestville, Maryland. He attended Towson University and the University of Maryland where he was a kinesiological sciences major.

== Professional career ==
Chad Scott was selected by the Pittsburgh Steelers as the 24th pick in the first round of the 1997 NFL draft. He had 21 interceptions, with four of them returned for touchdowns during his career. He was released by the Steelers on February 25, 2005. He was signed by the New England Patriots as a free agent on April 26, 2005. Scott suffered a knee injury during the first week of 2007 training camp and was placed on Injured Reserve by the Patriots. He did not play in the 1998 or 2007 seasons due to injury. He played in 108 games over nine seasons in the National Football League.

=== NFL statistics ===
| Year | Team | Games | Combined tackles | Tackles | Assisted tackles | Sacks | Forced fumbles | Fumble recoveries | Fumble return yards | Interceptions | Interception return yards | Yards per interception return | Longest interception return | Interceptions returned for touchdown | Passes defended |
|---|---|---|---|---|---|---|---|---|---|---|---|---|---|---|---|
| 1997 | PIT | 13 | 48 | 45 | 3 | 0.0 | 0 | 0 | 0 | 2 | -4 | -2 | 0 | 0 | 14 |
| 1999 | PIT | 13 | 50 | 49 | 1 | 0.0 | 0 | 0 | 0 | 1 | 16 | 16 | 16 | 0 | 8 |
| 2000 | PIT | 16 | 70 | 64 | 6 | 0.0 | 0 | 1 | 0 | 5 | 49 | 10 | 33 | 0 | 17 |
| 2001 | PIT | 15 | 80 | 71 | 9 | 0.0 | 0 | 0 | 0 | 5 | 204 | 41 | 62 | 2 | 21 |
| 2002 | PIT | 15 | 83 | 66 | 17 | 0.0 | 0 | 0 | 0 | 2 | 30 | 15 | 30 | 1 | 16 |
| 2003 | PIT | 12 | 55 | 43 | 12 | 0.0 | 1 | 0 | 0 | 3 | 50 | 17 | 26 | 1 | 13 |
| 2004 | PIT | 7 | 29 | 27 | 2 | 0.0 | 0 | 0 | 0 | 1 | 23 | 23 | 23 | 0 | 9 |
| 2005 | NE | 3 | 4 | 4 | 0 | 0.0 | 0 | 0 | 0 | 0 | 0 | 0 | 0 | 0 | 0 |
| 2006 | NE | 14 | 46 | 37 | 9 | 0.0 | 0 | 0 | 0 | 2 | 32 | 16 | 32 | 0 | 4 |
| Career | | 108 | 465 | 406 | 59 | 0.0 | 1 | 1 | 0 | 21 | 400 | 19 | 62 | 4 | 102 |
