= Nolan Harrison =

American football player (born 1969)

No. 74
- Positions: Defensive end, defensive tackle

Personal information
- Born: January 25, 1969 (age 57); Chicago, Illinois, U.S.
- Listed height: 6 ft 5 in (1.96 m)
- Listed weight: 280 lb (127 kg)

Career information
- High school: Homewood-Flossmoor (Flossmoor, Illinois)
- College: Indiana
- NFL draft: 1991: 6th round, 146th overall pick

Career history
- Los Angeles/Oakland Raiders (1991–1996); Pittsburgh Steelers (1997–1999); Washington Redskins (2000)

Career NFL statistics
- Tackles: 241
- Sacks: 22
- Forced fumbles: 5
- Stats at Pro Football Reference

Nolan Harrison III (born January 25, 1969) is an American former professional football player who was a defensive lineman for 10 seasons in the National Football League (NFL) with the Los Angeles/Oakland Raiders, Pittsburgh Steelers, and Washington Redskins. He played college football for the Indiana Hoosiers and was team captain All Big 10 Honorable Mention. Harrison was selected in the sixth round of the 1991 NFL draft. Harrison was a member of the Delta Chi Fraternity while at IU and received The Distinguished Delta Chi Award from the national Delta Chi Fraternity in 1997. He went to Homewood-Flossmoor High School in Flossmoor, Illinois and was a three-sport varsity letter winner in wrestling (185 pound weight class and heavyweight), track (400 m relay and mile relay) and football (defensive lineman) and in 2009 his high school football number was officially retired at a ceremony during the halftime of a McDonald's charitable basketball game being played by other former and current NFL players.

== Post pro football career ==
Nolan spent 10 years as an executive in the financial services industry after his 10-year NFL career. Harrison earned his accelerated financial planning certificate from the Arizona State University School of Global Management and Leadership in 2009. Nolan earned his Masters of Business Administration with an emphasis in global management from University of Phoenix in January 2012.

=== Union involvement ===
Nolan served as an NFL Players Association player representative and Executive Committee member during his ten-year playing career. Towards the end of his ten-year career, Harrison spearheaded the successful effort to ban a career threatening practice called "chop blocking" in the NFL. Harrison served as a chapter president and Board of Directors member of the NFL Players Association Former Players in his post-football career. In 2010, he was appointed as the senior director of former player services.

=== Acting/Speaking/Television/Media ===
Nolan gave a moving TEDx Talk at Indiana University on heroism. His talk was titled, "Childhood Dreams of Heroes, My Long and Winding Road" on YouTube and he discussed how his core values and views on heroism shaped his experiences from childhood, through college, to adulthood, enabling him to take a stand where some might not have to stop a sexual assault against a female student on campus.

Nolan landed an acting role in the USA film "Bloodhounds", starring Corbin Bernsen, playing the bad guy role of "Bootsie".

Host of the NFLPA internet news show "NFLPA TV".

Harrison has been a public speaker for many organizations like the NFL Players Association, Executives Breakfast Club, AFT, AFL-CIO, and TEDx speaking on a variety of leadership topics. Nolan blogs for AARP on volunteerism. Nolan blogs for Pro Player Insiders.
