= Joel Steed =

American football player (born 1969)

No. 93
- Position: Nose tackle

Personal information
- Born: February 17, 1969 (age 57); Frankfurt, Germany
- Listed height: 6 ft 2 in (1.88 m)
- Listed weight: 310 lb (141 kg)

Career information
- College: Colorado
- NFL draft: 1992: 3rd round, 67th overall pick

Career history
- Pittsburgh Steelers (1992–1999)

Awards and highlights
- Pro Bowl (1997); National champion (1990); First-team All-American (1991); 2× First-team All-Big Eight (1990, 1991); Second-team All-Big Eight (1989)

Career NFL statistics
- Tackles: 305
- Sacks: 9.5
- Fumble recoveries: 4
- Stats at Pro Football Reference

Joel Steed (born February 17, 1969) is an American former professional football player who was a nose tackle for eight seasons for the Pittsburgh Steelers of the National Football League (NFL). He played college football for the Colorado Buffaloes.

Steed was selected by the Steelers in the third round of the 1992 NFL draft. Steed quickly started at nose tackle and was a starter for the team throughout the 1990s.
