= Paul Wiggins (American football) =

American football player (born 1973)

No. 79, 73, 67
- Position: Offensive tackle

Personal information
- Born: August 17, 1973 (age 53); Portland, Oregon, U.S.
- Listed height: 6 ft 3 in (1.91 m)
- Listed weight: 305 lb (138 kg)

Career information
- High school: Benson (Portland, Oregon)
- College: Oregon
- NFL draft: 1997: 3rd round, 82nd overall pick
- Expansion draft: 1999: 1st round, 17th overall pick

Career history
- Pittsburgh Steelers (1997–1998); Washington Redskins (1998); Cleveland Browns (1999)*; Denver Broncos (1999)*; Amsterdam Admirals (2000)
- * Offseason or practice squad member only

Awards and highlights
- 2× Second-team All-Pac-10 (1995, 1996)

Career NFL statistics
- Games played: 2
- Stats at Pro Football Reference

Paul Anthony Wiggins (born August 17, 1973) is an American former professional football player who was an offensive lineman in the National Football League (NFL) for the Pittsburgh Steelers, the Denver Broncos and lastly, the Washington Redskins. He played college football at the University of Oregon and was selected in the third round of the 1997 NFL draft with the 82nd overall pick.
