= Tom White (American football official) =

American football official

Tom White was an American football official in the United States Football League (USFL) from 1983 to 1986 and then National Football League (NFL) for seventeen seasons from the 1989 to 2005 seasons. He started in the league as a head linesman and was promoted to referee with the start of the 1990 NFL season. He wore uniform number 123. He is also an alumnus of the Sigma Tau Gamma fraternity.

White was once referred to as Alfred Hitchcock for facial similarities by former ABC Sports color commentator Dennis Miller during a Monday Night Football game.

White was fined half a game check ($2,600) by the NFL for an administrative error made by his officiating crew in a 2003 regular season game between the Baltimore Ravens and Seattle Seahawks. They refused to restart the 40-second clock after an officials' conference over a penalty call with 58 seconds left in the fourth quarter. Baltimore was able to save its last timeout as a result, using the 40 seconds to tie the game. Baltimore eventually won in overtime, by the score of 44 to 41.
