= 2003 Pittsburgh Steelers season =

Pittsburgh Steelers 71st US football season

- Owner: The Rooney Family
- General manager: Kevin Colbert
- Head coach: Bill Cowher
- Home stadium: Heinz Field

Results
- Record: 6–10
- Division place: 3rd AFC North
- Playoffs: Did not qualify
- All-Pros: Alan Faneca (2nd team); Hines Ward (2nd team)
- Pro Bowlers: 3: G Alan Faneca; NT Casey Hampton; WR Hines Ward
- Team MVP: Hines Ward
- Team ROY: Troy Polamalu

The 2003 Pittsburgh Steelers season was the franchise's 71st season as a professional sports franchise and as a member of the National Football League.

Their season began with the team trying to improve on their 10–5–1 record from 2002 in which they lost to the Tennessee Titans in the divisional round of the playoffs.

With the team suffering through injuries as well as less reliance on the running game than normal, the Steelers stumbled to a 6–10 record, going the entire season without winning consecutive games. Since moving to Heinz Field in 2001, this was the Steelers' first season with a losing record and their first season missing the playoffs. The team's record is tied with that of the 1999 season as the worst for a season under head coach Bill Cowher. This was the Steelers' only losing season from 2000 to 2025.

In his final season with the team, linebacker Jason Gildon became the franchise's career sack leader during a game against the Arizona Cardinals on November 9.

Since then, this represents the most recent losing season for the Steelers, as well as the only time they've lost to the Browns on Heinz Field in the regular season.

== Offseason ==
Additions	Subtractions
TE Jay Riemersma (Bills)	QB Kordell Stewart (Bears)
T Todd Fordham (Jaguars)	K Todd Peterson (49ers)
LB Clint Kriewaldt (Lions)	T Wayne Gandy (Saints)
WR Chris Doering (Redskins)	

=== NFL draft ===
2003 Pittsburgh Steelers draft
Round	Pick	Player	Position	College	Notes
1	16	Troy Polamalu * ^{†}	Safety	USC	
2	59	Alonzo Jackson	Linebacker	Florida State	
4	125	Ike Taylor	Cornerback	Louisiana–Lafayette	
5	163	Brian St. Pierre	Quarterback	Boston College	
7	242	J. T. Wall	Running back	Georgia	
Made roster † Pro Football Hall of Fame * Made at least one Pro Bowl during career

=== Undrafted free agents ===
2003 undrafted free agents of note
Player	Position	College
Jason Armstead	Wide receiver	Ole Miss
Roy Attieh	Defensive Tackle	Kent State
Phil Braxton	Wide receiver	West Virginia
Dante Brown	Running back	Memphis
Nashville Dyer	Cornerback	Kent State
Jack Fadule	Tackle	Harvard
Rashad Faison	Safety	South Carolina
Casey Poppinga	Tight end	Utah State
Dan Rumishek	Defensive end	Michigan
Jonathan Ruffin	Kicker	Cincinnati
Leonard Scott	Wide receiver	Tennessee
Russell Stuvaints	Safety	Youngstown State

== Personnel ==
2003 Pittsburgh Steelers staff
Front office: Chairman – Daniel M. Rooney; President – Arthur J. Rooney II; Vice president – John R. McGinley; Vice president – Arthur J. Rooney, Jr.; Administration advisor – Chuck Noll; Director of business – Mark Hart; Business accounting coordinator – Jim Ellenberger; Human relations/office coordinator – Geraldine Glenn; Business operations – Omar Khan; Accounting manager – Jodie Spagnolli; Communications coordinator – Ron Wahl; Public relations/media manager – David Lockett; Website/network administrator – Scott Phelps; Marketing; Director of marketing – Tony Quatrini; Marketing coordinator – Rick Giugliano; Client services administrator – Amy Corbett; Marketing manager – John Wodarek; Producer/broadcasting manager – Rick Fairbend; Marketing/community relations manager – Lynne Molyneaux; Marketing assistant – John Simpson; Marketing assistant – Mike Marchinsky; Ticket operations; Ticket manager – Ben Lentz; Season ticket assistant – Libby Patcher; Football operations; Director of football operations – Kevin Colbert; College scouting coordinator – Ron Hughes; Pro scouting coordinator – Doug Whaley; Pro/college scout – Phil Kreidler; College scout – Mark Gorscak; College scout – Bob Lane; College scout – Bruce McNorton; College scout – Dan Rooney; College scout – Bill Nunn; BLESTO Scout – Kelvin Fisher; Head coaches: Head coach – Bill Cowher; Offensive coaches: Offensive coordinator – Mike Mularkey; Quarterbacks – Tom Clements; Running backs – Dick Hoak; Wide receivers – Kenny Jackson; Tight ends – Ken Whisenhunt; Offensive line – Russ Grimm; Offensive assistant – Mike Miller	Defensive coaches: Defensive coordinator – Tim Lewis; Defensive line – John Mitchell; Linebackers – Keith Butler; Defensive backs – Darren Perry; Defensive assistant – Lou Spanos; Special teams coaches: Special teams – Kevin Spencer; Strength and conditioning: Conditioning coach – Chet Fuhrman; Medical staff; Ophthalmologist – Dr. Randy Beatty; Physician, orthopedic – Dr. James P. Bradley; Neurological surgeon – Dr. Joseph Maroon; Physician, M.D. – Dr. Richard Rydze; Physician, consultant – Dr. Abraham J. Twerski; Physician, M.D. – Dr. Anthony P. Yates; Training staff; Head athletic trainer – John Norwig; Assistant athletic trainer – Ryan Grove; Assistant athletic trainer – Ariko Iso; Football staff; Player development coordinator – Anthony Griggs; Equipment manager – Rodgers Freyvogel; Field manager – Rich Baker; Field/equipment assistant – Kalvin Jones; Video coordinator – Bob McCartney; Video assistant – Andy Lizanich; Video assistant – Rob Brakel; Photographers – Mike Fabus

Notable additions include Troy Polamalu and Ike Taylor.

== Roster ==
2003 Pittsburgh Steelers roster
Quarterbacks (QB): 16 Charlie Batch; 8 Tommy Maddox; 2 Brian St. Pierre; Running backs (RB): 36 Jerome Bettis; 46 Dante Brown; 22 Dee Brown; 35 Dan Kreider FB; 21 Amos Zereoué; Wide receivers (WR): 80 Plaxico Burress; 83 Chris Doering; 89 Lee Mays; 81 Freddie Milons; 82 Antwaan Randle El; 86 Hines Ward; Tight ends (TE): 87 Mark Bruener; 48 Matt Cushing; 85 Jay Riemersma; 84 Jerame Tuman	Offensive linemen (OL): 72 Barrett Brooks T; 66 Alan Faneca G/T; 71 Todd Fordham T; 64 Jeff Hartings C; 56 Chukky Okobi C/G; 79 Oliver Ross T; 73 Kendall Simmons G; 68 Keydrick Vincent G; Defensive linemen (DL): 94 Rodney Bailey DE; 96 Kendrick Clancy NT; 98 Casey Hampton NT; 76 Chris Hoke NT; 91 Aaron Smith DE; 67 Kimo von Oelhoffen DE	Linebackers (LB): 97 Kendrell Bell ILB; 51 James Farrior ILB; 50 Larry Foote ILB; 92 Jason Gildon OLB; 53 Clark Haggans OLB; 95 Alonzo Jackson OLB; 57 Clint Kriewaldt ILB; 55 Joey Porter OLB; Defensive backs (DB): 27 Brent Alexander FS; 28 Chris Hope FS; 29 Chidi Iwuoma CB; 31 Mike Logan SS; 43 Troy Polamalu SS; 33 Russell Stuvaints FS; 24 Ike Taylor CB; 26 Deshea Townsend CB; 25 B. J. Tucker CB; 20 Dewayne Washington CB; Special teams (ST): 4 Josh Miller P; 3 Jeff Reed K; 54 Mike Schneck LS	Practice squad: 60 Josh Burr T; 61 Morgan Pears T; 62 Jimond Pugh C; 65 David Upchurch DE; 49 J. T. Wall FB; Reserve: 34 Verron Haynes RB (IR); 99 Brett Keisel DE (IR); 78 Mathias Nkwenti T (IR); 30 Chad Scott CB (IR); 77 Marvel Smith T (IR); Rookies in italics 53 active, 5 reserve, 5 practice squad

== Preseason ==
=== Schedule ===
Week	Date	Opponent	Result	Record	Game Site	NFL Recap
1	August 9	at Detroit Lions	L 13–26	0–1	Ford Field	
2	August 16	Philadelphia Eagles	L 16–21	0–2	Heinz Field	
3	August 21	Dallas Cowboys	W 15–14	1–2	Heinz Field	
4	August 29	at Carolina Panthers	L 14–21	1–3	Bank of America Stadium	

== Regular season ==
=== Schedule ===
Week	Date	Opponent	Result	Record	Game Site	NFL Recap
1	September 7	**Baltimore Ravens**	**W** 34–15	1–0	Heinz Field	Summary
2	September 14	at Kansas City Chiefs	**L** 20–41	1–1	Arrowhead Stadium	Summary
3	September 21	at **Cincinnati Bengals**	**W** 17–10	2–1	Paul Brown Stadium	Summary
4	September 28	Tennessee Titans	**L** 13–30	2–2	Heinz Field	Summary
5	October 5	**Cleveland Browns**	**L** 13–33	2–3	Heinz Field	Summary
6	October 12	at Denver Broncos	**L** 14–17	2–4	Invesco Field at Mile High	Summary
7	Bye					
8	October 26	St. Louis Rams	**L** 21–33	2–5	Heinz Field	Summary
9	November 2	at Seattle Seahawks	**L** 16–23	2–6	Seahawks Stadium	Summary
10	November 9	Arizona Cardinals	**W** 28–15	3–6	Heinz Field	Summary
11	November 17	at San Francisco 49ers	**L** 14–30	3–7	San Francisco Stadium	Summary
12	November 23	at **Cleveland Browns**	**W** 13–6	4–7	Cleveland Browns Stadium	Summary
13	November 30	**Cincinnati Bengals**	**L** 20–24	4–8	Heinz Field	Summary
14	December 7	Oakland Raiders	**W** 27–7	5–8	Heinz Field	Summary
15	December 14	at New York Jets	**L** 0–6	5–9	Giants Stadium	Summary
16	December 21	San Diego Chargers	**W** 40–24	6–9	Heinz Field	Summary
17	December 28	at **Baltimore Ravens**	**L** 10–13 (OT)	6–10	M&T Bank Stadium	Summary

Note: Intra-divisional opponents are in bold text.

=== Game summaries ===
==== Week 1 ====
Week One: Baltimore Ravens (0–0) at Pittsburgh Steelers (0–0)

Quarter	1	2	3	4	Total
Ravens	0	0	7	8	**15**
Steelers	6	7	14	7	**34**

at Heinz Field • Pittsburgh, Pennsylvania

- Date: September 7
- Game time: 1:00 p.m. EDT
- Game weather: Mostly cloudy • 75 °F (24 °C) • Wind 3 miles per hour (4.8 km/h; 2.6 kn)
- Game attendance: 63,157
- Referee: Ron Winter
- TV announcers (CBS): Ian Eagle and Solomon Wilcots
- Pro-Football-Reference.com

Game information

Ravens

- Kyle Boller
  22/43, 152 Yds, TD, INT
- Jamal Lewis
  15 Rush, 69 Yds
- Todd Heap
  6 Rec, 55 Yds

Steelers

- Tommy Maddox
  21/29, 260 Yds, 3 TD
- Amos Zereoue
  15 Rush, 56 Yds, TD
- Plaxico Burress
  6 Rec, 116 Yds

Pittsburgh won their season opener for the first time since 1999.

Scoring summary

Quarter	Time	Drive			Team	Scoring information	Score	
Quarter	Time	Plays	Yards	TOP	Team	Scoring information	BAL	PIT
1	10:19	10	69	4:41	Steelers	29-yard field goal by Jeff Reed	0	3
1	4:01	8	15	3:21	Steelers	31-yard field goal by Jeff Reed	0	6
2	2:57	8	90	4:08	Steelers	Hines Ward 4-yard touchdown reception from Tommy Maddox, Jeff Reed kick good	0	13
3	9:49	8	60	3:23	Steelers	Jay Riemersma 20-yard touchdown reception from Tommy Maddox, Jeff Reed kick good	0	20
3	3:54	1	28	0:07	Steelers	Hines Ward 28-yard touchdown reception from Tommy Maddox, Jeff Reed kick good	0	27
3	1:56	3	80	1:58	Ravens	Jamal Lewis 14-yard touchdown run, Matt Stover kick good	7	27
4	9:01	9	48	3:59	Steelers	Amos Zereoue 8-yard touchdown run, Jeff Reed kick good	7	34
4	4:22	3	2	1:02	Ravens	Travis Taylor 5-yard touchdown reception from Kyle Boller, 2-point pass good	15	34
"TOP" = time of possession. For other American football terms, see Glossary of American football.							15	34

==== Week 2 ====
Team	1	2	3	4	Total
Steelers	17	3	0	0	20
• **Chiefs**	7	20	7	7	41

- Date: September 14
- Location: Arrowhead Stadium, Kansas City, Missouri
- Game start: 1:00 p.m. EST
- Game attendance: 78,416
- Referee: Larry Nemmers
- TV announcers (CBS): Kevin Harlan and Randy Cross

==== Week 3 ====
Team	1	2	3	4	Total
• **Steelers**	0	7	7	3	17
Bengals	0	0	3	7	10

- Date: September 21
- Location: Paul Brown Stadium, Cincinnati
- Game start: 1:00 p.m. EST
- Game attendance: 64,596
- Referee: Walt Coleman
- TV announcers (CBS): Gus Johnson and Brent Jones

==== Week 4 ====
Team	1	2	3	4	Total
• **Titans**	0	16	7	7	30
Steelers	3	10	0	0	13

- Date: September 28
- Location: Heinz Field, Pittsburgh, Pennsylvania
- Game start: 1:00 p.m. EST
- Game attendance: 63,244
- Game weather: 55 °F (13 °C) (Cloudy)
- Referee: Walt Anderson
- TV announcers (CBS): Gus Johnson and Brent Jones

==== Week 5 ====
Team	1	2	3	4	Total
• **Browns**	10	13	7	3	33
Steelers	0	10	3	0	13

- Date: October 5
- Location: Heinz Field, Pittsburgh, Pennsylvania
- Game start: 8:30 p.m. EST
- Game attendance: 64,595
- Game weather: 46 °F (8 °C) (Clear)
- Referee: Gerald Austin
- TV announcers (ESPN): Mike Patrick, Joe Theismann, Paul Maguire & Suzy Kolber

This was Pittsburgh's last loss at home against Cleveland until 2020. As of 2025, this is the Steelers last regular season loss at home to Cleveland.

==== Week 6 ====
Team	1	2	3	4	Total
Steelers	3	3	0	8	14
• **Broncos**	0	7	0	10	17

- Date: October 12
- Location: Invesco Field at Mile High, Denver, Colorado
- Game start: 4:15 p.m. EST
- Game attendance: 75,974
- Referee: Mike Carey
- TV announcers (CBS): Greg Gumbel, Phil Simms, and Armen Keteyian

==== Week 8 ====
Team	1	2	3	4	Total
• **Rams**	7	10	10	6	33
Steelers	7	7	7	0	21

- Date: October 26
- Location: Heinz Field, Pittsburgh, Pennsylvania
- Game start: 1:00 p.m. EST
- Game attendance: 62,665
- Game weather: 59 °F (15 °C) (Light Rain)
- Referee: Johnny Grier
- TV announcers (Fox): Sam Rosen & Bill Maas

This was the 1,000th game in Steelers history.

==== Week 9 ====
Team	1	2	3	4	Total
Steelers	0	3	3	10	16
• **Seahawks**	3	3	3	14	23

- Date: November 2
- Location: Seahawks Stadium, Seattle
- Game start: 4:05 p.m. EST
- Game attendance: 66,507
- Referee: Bill Leavy
- TV announcers (CBS): Dick Enberg, Dan Dierdorf, and Bonnie Bernstein

==== Week 10 ====
Team	1	2	3	4	Total
Cardinals	0	3	6	6	15
• **Steelers**	0	7	21	0	28

- Date: November 9
- Location: Heinz Field, Pittsburgh, Pennsylvania
- Game start: 1:00 p.m. EST
- Game attendance: 59,520
- Game weather: 41 °F (5 °C) (Sunny)
- Referee: Jeff Triplette
- TV announcers (Fox): Ron Pitts & Tim Ryan, and Alby Oxenreiter

==== Week 11 ====
Team	1	2	3	4	Total
Steelers	0	0	7	7	14
• **49ers**	7	3	14	6	30

- Date: November 17
- Location: San Francisco Stadium, San Francisco
- Game start: 9:00 p.m. EST
- Game attendance: 67,877
- Referee: Ed Hochuli
- TV announcers (ABC): Al Michaels, John Madden & Lisa Guerrero

==== Week 12 ====
Team	1	2	3	4	Total
• **Steelers**	0	10	0	3	13
Browns	3	3	0	0	6

- Date: November 23
- Location: Cleveland Browns Stadium, Cleveland, Ohio
- Game start: 1:00 p.m. EST
- Game attendance: 73,658
- Referee: Walt Coleman
- TV announcers (CBS): Ian Eagle & Solomon Wilcots

The Steelers were the only team in the 2003 season to play on the road following a Monday night road game. The NFL at that time had typically given teams that traveled for a Monday night game either a home game or their bye week the following week. Steelers head coach Bill Cowher objected to the team playing a road game after a Monday night road game. Team president Dan Rooney said that he would not pursue the matter with the NFL, noting that the second game was in Cleveland, only 112 miles (180 km) from Pittsburgh.

==== Week 13 ====
Team	1	2	3	4	Total
• **Bengals**	7	7	0	10	24
Steelers	0	3	7	10	20

- Date: November 30
- Location: Heinz Field, Pittsburgh, Pennsylvania
- Game start: 1:00 p.m. EST
- Game attendance: 58,797
- Game weather: 46 °F (8 °C) (Sunny)
- Referee: Bernie Kukar
- TV announcers (CBS): Don Criqui & Steve Tasker

==== Week 14 ====
Team	1	2	3	4	Total
Raiders	7	0	0	0	7
• **Steelers**	0	17	7	3	27

- Date: December 7
- Location: Heinz Field, Pittsburgh, Pennsylvania
- Game start: 1:00 p.m. EST
- Game attendance: 53,079
- Game weather: 30 °F (−1 °C) (Partly Cloudy)
- Referee: Johnny Grier
- TV announcers (CBS): Gus Johnson & Brent Jones

==== Week 15 ====
Team	1	2	3	4	Total
Steelers	0	0	0	0	0
• **Jets**	3	3	0	0	6

- Date: December 14
- Location: Giants Stadium, East Rutherford, New Jersey
- Game start: 1:00 p.m. EST
- Game attendance: 77,900
- Referee: Terry McAulay
- TV announcers (CBS): Gus Johnson & Brent Jones

With the loss, the Steelers would be eliminated from playoff contention at 5-9, their first and only losing season since 1999.

==== Week 16 ====
Team	1	2	3	4	Total
Chargers	0	10	7	7	24
• **Steelers**	14	7	7	12	40

- Date: December 21
- Location: Heinz Field, Pittsburgh, Pennsylvania
- Game start: 4:05 p.m. EST
- Game attendance: 52,527
- Game weather: 37 °F (3 °C) (Sunny)
- Referee: Bill Carollo
- TV announcers (CBS): Don Criqui & Steve Tasker

==== Week 17 ====
Team	1	2	3	4	OT	Total
Steelers	0	0	10	0	0	10
• **Ravens**	7	0	0	3	3	13

- Date: December 28
- Location: M&T Bank Stadium, Baltimore, Maryland
- Game start: 8:30 p.m. EST
- Game attendance: 70,001
- Referee: Walt Anderson
- TV announcers (ESPN): Mike Patrick, Joe Theismann, Paul Maguire & Suzy Kolber

With the loss the Steelers would finish their season at 6-10, their most recent losing season as of 2025.

== Standings ==
AFC North
	W	L	T	PCT	DIV	CONF	PF	PA	STK
^{(4)} Baltimore Ravens	10	6	0	.625	4–2	7–5	391	281	W2
Cincinnati Bengals	8	8	0	.500	3–3	6–6	346	384	L2
Pittsburgh Steelers	6	10	0	.375	3–3	5–7	300	327	L1
Cleveland Browns	5	11	0	.313	2–4	3–9	254	322	W1
