= 2001 Pittsburgh Steelers season =

Pittsburgh Steelers 69th US football season

- Owner: The Rooney Family
- General manager: Kevin Colbert
- Head coach: Bill Cowher
- Offensive coordinator: Mike Mularkey
- Defensive coordinator: Tim Lewis
- Home stadium: Heinz Field

Results
- Record: 13–3
- Division place: 1st AFC Central
- Playoffs: Won Divisional Playoffs (vs. Ravens) 27–10; Lost AFC Championship (vs. Patriots) 17–24
- All-Pros: 4: Alan Faneca (1st team); Jason Gildon (1st team); Kendrell Bell (2nd team); Jeff Hartings (2nd team)
- Pro Bowlers: 6: LB Kendrell Bell; RB Jerome Bettis; G Alan Faneca; OLB Jason Gildon; QB Kordell Stewart; WR Hines Ward
- Team MVP: Kordell Stewart
- Team ROY: Kendrell Bell

The 2001 Pittsburgh Steelers season was the franchise's 69th season as a professional sports franchise and as a member of the National Football League (NFL). After finishing the previous three seasons a combined 22–26, the Steelers returned to the top seed in the AFC, rolling to a 13–3 record in their first playoff berth and AFC Central title since 1997 and playing at Heinz Field. The Steelers went 7–1 in their new home stadium, with the only loss coming to the defending Super Bowl champion Baltimore Ravens (a loss the Steelers avenged in the divisional playoffs).

However, for the third time in Bill Cowher's coaching tenure, the Steelers fell in the AFC Championship Game at home. This time, the eventual Super Bowl champion New England Patriots upset the top-seeded Steelers.

The Steelers ran the ball 580 times in 2001, the most in the NFL.

== Offseason ==
Additions	Subtractions
C Jeff Hartings (Lions)	LB Levon Kirkland (Seahawks)
S Mike Logan (Jaguars)	RB Richard Huntley (Panthers)
QB Tommy Maddox (XFL)	LB Mike Vrabel (Patriots)
LB Mike Jones (Rams)	C Dermontti Dawson (retirement)
	QB Kent Graham (Redskins)

=== NFL draft ===
2001 Pittsburgh Steelers draft
Round	Pick	Player	Position	College	Notes
1	19	Casey Hampton *	Defensive tackle	Texas	from N. Y. Jets
2	39	Kendrell Bell *	Linebacker	Georgia	from New England
4	111	Mathias Nkwenti	Tackle	Temple	from N. Y. Jets
5	146	Chukky Okobi	Center	Purdue	
6	181	Rodney Bailey	Defensive end	Ohio State	from N. J. Jets
6	182	Roger Knight	Linebacker	Wisconsin	
7	218	Chris Taylor	Wide receiver	Texas A&M	
Made roster * Made at least one Pro Bowl during career

=== Undrafted free agents ===
2001 undrafted free agents of note
Player	Position	College
Luis Almanzar	Defensive tackle	Southwest Missouri State
Tim Baker	Wide receiver	Texas Tech
David Bobo	Guard	TCU
Chad Evitts	Linebacker	Tennessee Tech
Eddie Faulkner	Running back	Wisconsin
Rob Fehrman	Tackle	Bowling Green
Rob Frazier	Fullback	Florida
Joey Getherall	Wide receiver	Notre Dame
Chris Hoke	Defensive tackle	BYU
Andy Kohl	Kicker/Punter	New Mexico State
Justin Kurpeikis	Linebacker	Penn State
Vanness Provitt	Wide receiver	Ohio State
Adrian Sadler	Cornerback	Rice
Ryan Sprague	Tight end	Florida State
Nigel Tharpe	Defensive tackle	Iowa State
Keydrick Vincent	Guard	Ole Miss

== Personnel ==
2001 Pittsburgh Steelers staff
Front office: President – Daniel M. Rooney; Vice president & general counsel – Arthur J. Rooney II; Vice president – John R. McGinley; Vice president – Arthur J. Rooney, Jr.; Administration advisor – Chuck Noll; Director of business – Mark Hart; Business accounting coordinator – Jim Ellenberger; Human relations/office coordinator – Geraldine Glenn; Business coordinator – Omar Khan; Accounting manager – Jodie Spagnolli; Communications coordinator – Ron Wahl; Public relations/media manager – David Lockett; Network administrator – Scott Phelps; Marketing and merchandising; Director of marketing – Tony Quatrini; Marketing coordinator – Rick Giugliano; Merchandising manager – Tim Carey; Assistant merchandising manager – Sam Rogiero; Marketing assistant – John Wodarek; Producer/broadcasting manager – Rick Fairbend; Marketing/community relations manager – Lynne Molyneaux; Marketing assistant – John Simpson; Marketing assistant – Mike Marchinsky; Ticket operations; Ticket manager – Brian Bonifate; Football operations; Director of football operations – Kevin Colbert; College scouting coordinator – Bill Baker; Pro scouting coordinator – Doug Whaley; Pro/college scout – Phil Kreidler; College scout – Mark Gorscak; College scout – Bob Lane; College scout – Bruce McNorton; College scout – Dan Rooney; College scout – Bill Nunn; BLESTO Scout – Kelvin Fisher; Head coaches: Head coach – Bill Cowher; Offensive coaches: Offensive coordinator – Mike Mularkey; Quarterbacks – Tom Clements; Running backs – Dick Hoak; Wide receivers – Kenny Jackson; Tight ends – Ken Whisenhunt; Offensive line – Russ Grimm; Offensive assistant – Mike Miller	Defensive coaches: Defensive coordinator – Tim Lewis; Defensive line – John Mitchell; Linebackers – Mike Archer; Defensive backs – Willy Robinson; Defensive assistant – Lou Spanos; Special teams coaches: Special teams – Jay Hayes; Strength and conditioning: Conditioning coach – Chet Fuhrman; Medical staff; Ophthalmologist – Dr. Randy Beatty; Physician, orthopedic – Dr. James P. Bradley; Neurological surgeon – Dr. Joseph Maroon; Physician, M.D. – Dr. Richard Rydze; Physician, consultant – Dr. Abraham J. Twerski; Physician, M.D. – Dr. Anthony P. Yates; Training staff; Head athletic trainer – John Norwig; Assistant athletic trainer – Ryan Grove; Football staff; Player development coordinator – Anthony Griggs; Equipment manager - Rodgers Freyvogel; Field manager – Rich Baker; Field/equipment assistant – Paul Gallagher; Video coordinator – Bob McCartney; Video assistant – Andy Lizanich; Video assistant – Rob Brakel; Photographers – Mike Fabus

Notable additions include Casey Hampton, Jeff Hartings and Kendrell Bell.

== Roster ==
2001 Pittsburgh Steelers roster
Quarterbacks (QB): 8 Tommy Maddox; 17 Tee Martin; 10 Kordell Stewart; Running backs (RB): 36 Jerome Bettis; 33 R. J. Bowers; 45 Chris Fuamatu-Maʻafala; 35 Dan Kreider FB; 38 Jon Witman FB; 21 Amos Zereoué; Wide receivers (WR): 80 Plaxico Burress; 81 Troy Edwards; 83 Lenzie Jackson; 82 Bobby Shaw; 86 Hines Ward; Tight ends (TE): 48 Matt Cushing; 85 Cory Geason; 84 Jerame Tuman	Offensive linemen (OL): 62 Roger Duffy C/G; 66 Alan Faneca G; 72 Wayne Gandy T; 64 Jeff Hartings C; 78 Mathias Nkwenti T; 56 Chukky Okobi C/G; 79 Oliver Ross G/T; 77 Marvel Smith T; 66 Rich Tylski G; 68 Keydrick Vincent G; Defensive linemen (DL): 94 Rodney Bailey DE; 96 Kendrick Clancy NT; 73 Chris Combs DE; 98 Casey Hampton NT; 91 Aaron Smith DE; 67 Kimo von Oelhoffen DE	Linebackers (LB): 97 Kendrell Bell ILB; 57 John Fiala ILB; 92 Jason Gildon OLB; 53 Clark Haggans OLB; 50 Earl Holmes ILB; 51 Mike Jones ILB; 90 Justin Kurpeikis OLB; 55 Joey Porter OLB; Defensive backs (DB): 27 Brent Alexander FS; 40 Myron Bell SS; 41 Lethon Flowers SS; 31 Mike Logan FS; 22 Hank Poteat CB; 30 Chad Scott CB; 23 Jason Simmons CB; 26 Deshea Townsend CB; 20 Dewayne Washington CB; Special teams (ST): 3 Kris Brown K; 4 Josh Miller; 54 Mike Schneck LS	Practice squad: 18 Tim Baker WR; 19 Demetrius Brown WR; 95 Rameel Connor DE; 76 Chris Hoke DE; 43 Payton Williams CB; Reserve: 89 Will Blackwell WR (IR); 87 Mark Bruener TE (IR); Rookies in italics 53 active, 2 reserve, 5 practice squad

== Preseason ==
=== Schedule ===
Week	Date	Opponent	Result	Record	Venue
1	August 3	at Atlanta Falcons	W 17–16	1–0	Georgia Dome
2	August 16	at Minnesota Vikings	L 10–24	1–1	Hubert H. Humphrey Metrodome
3	August 25	Detroit Lions	W 20–7	2–1	Heinz Field
4	August 30	Buffalo Bills	W 20–0	3–1	Heinz Field

== Regular season ==
=== Schedule ===
Week	Date	Opponent	Result	Record	Venue	Recap
1	September 9	at **Jacksonville Jaguars**	**L** 3–21	0–1	Alltel Stadium	Recap
2 (Note: The Steelers were originally scheduled to host the Cleveland Browns during Week 2 of the original NFL schedule (September 16) at Heinz Field. However, due to the September 11 attacks, the game was rescheduled to Week 17.)	Bye					
3	September 30	at Buffalo Bills	**W** 20–3	1–1	Ralph Wilson Stadium	Recap
4	October 7	**Cincinnati Bengals**	**W** 16–7	2–1	Heinz Field	Recap
5	October 14	at Kansas City Chiefs	**W** 20–17	3–1	Arrowhead Stadium	Recap
6	October 21	at Tampa Bay Buccaneers	**W** 17–10	4–1	Raymond James Stadium	Recap
7	October 29	**Tennessee Titans**	**W** 34–7	5–1	Heinz Field	Recap
8	November 4	**Baltimore Ravens**	**L** 10–13	5–2	Heinz Field	Recap
9	November 11	at **Cleveland Browns**	**W** 15–12 (OT)	6–2	Cleveland Browns Stadium	Recap
10	November 18	**Jacksonville Jaguars**	**W** 20–7	7–2	Heinz Field	Recap
11	November 25	at **Tennessee Titans**	**W** 34–24	8–2	Adelphia Coliseum	Recap
12	December 2	Minnesota Vikings	**W** 21–16	9–2	Heinz Field	Recap
13	December 9	New York Jets	**W** 18–7	10–2	Heinz Field	Recap
14	December 16	at **Baltimore Ravens**	**W** 26–21	11–2	PSINet Stadium	Recap
15	December 23	Detroit Lions	**W** 47–14	12–2	Heinz Field	Recap
16	December 30	at **Cincinnati Bengals**	**L** 23–26 (OT)	12–3	Paul Brown Stadium	Recap
17	January 6	**Cleveland Browns**	**W** 28–7	13–3	Heinz Field	Recap
Note: Intra-division opponents are in **bold** text.

== Standings ==
AFC Central
	W	L	T	PCT	PF	PA	STK
^{(1)} Pittsburgh Steelers	13	3	0	.813	352	212	W1
^{(5)} Baltimore Ravens	10	6	0	.625	303	265	W1
Cleveland Browns	7	9	0	.438	285	319	L1
Tennessee Titans	7	9	0	.438	336	388	L2
Jacksonville Jaguars	6	10	0	.375	294	286	L2
Cincinnati Bengals	6	10	0	.375	226	309	W2

=== Game summaries ===
==== Week 1 (Sunday September 9, 2001): at Jacksonville Jaguars ====
	1	2	3	4	Total
Steelers	0	3	0	0	3
Jaguars	0	21	0	0	21

at Alltel Stadium, Jacksonville, Florida

- Game time: 1:00 pm EDT
- Game weather: 83 °F (28 °C) (sunny and rain)
- Game attendance: 63,785
- Referee: Mack Gentry
- TV announcers: (CBS) Don Criqui (play by play), Craig James (color commentator), Beasley Reece (sideline reporter)

==== (Sunday September 16, 2001): vs. Cleveland Browns ====
Due to the September 11th attacks the National Football League postponed all games. It was played after the rest of the scheduled season had been completed.

==== Week 3 (Sunday September 30, 2001): at Buffalo Bills ====
	1	2	3	4	Total
Steelers	7	3	0	10	20
Bills	0	3	0	0	3

at Ralph Wilson Stadium, Orchard Park, New York

- Game time: 1:00 pm EDT
- Game weather: 63 °F (17 °C) (sunny)
- Game attendance: 72,874
- Referee: Tom White
- TV announcers: (CBS) Ian Eagle (play by play), Solomon Wilcots (color commentator)

==== Week 4 (Sunday October 7, 2001): vs. Cincinnati Bengals ====
	1	2	3	4	Total
Bengals	0	0	0	7	7
Steelers	0	10	0	6	16

at Heinz Field, Pittsburgh, Pennsylvania

- Game time: 1:00 pm EDT
- Game weather: 46 °F (8 °C) (Partly Cloudy)
- Game attendance: 62,335
- Referee: Larry Nemmers
- TV announcers: (CBS) Bill Macatee (play by play), Trevor Matich (color commentator)

This was the first game at Heinz Field. Also Jerome Bettis passed 10,000 yards rushing for his career.

==== Week 5 (Sunday October 14, 2001): at Kansas City Chiefs ====
	1	2	3	4	Total
Steelers	0	6	14	0	20
Chiefs	0	2	0	15	17

at Arrowhead Stadium, Kansas City, Missouri

- Game time: 1:00 pm EDT
- Game weather: 57 °F (14 °C) (sunny)
- Game attendance: 78,413
- Referee: Ron Blum
- TV announcers: (CBS) Gus Johnson (play by play), Brent Jones (color commentator)

==== Week 6 (Sunday October 21, 2001): at Tampa Bay Buccaneers ====
	1	2	3	4	Total
Steelers	0	7	10	0	17
Buccaneers	0	3	0	7	10

at Raymond James Stadium, Tampa, Florida

- Game time: 1:00 pm EDT
- Game weather: 84 °F (29 °C) (partly cloudy/rain)
- Game attendance: 65,588
- Referee: Ed Hochuli
- TV announcers: (CBS) Dick Enberg (play by play), Dan Dierdorf (color commentator), Bonnie Bernstein (sideline reporter)

==== Week 7 (Monday October 29, 2001): vs. Tennessee Titans ====
	1	2	3	4	Total
Titans	0	7	0	0	7
Steelers	7	10	10	7	34

at Heinz Field, Pittsburgh, Pennsylvania

- Game time: 9:00 pm EST
- Game weather: 51 °F (11 °C) (Cloudy)
- Game attendance: 63,763
- Referee: Terry McAulay
- TV announcers: (ABC) Al Michaels (play by play), Dan Fouts & Dennis Miller (color commentators), Eric Dickerson & Melissa Stark (sideline reporters)

==== Week 8 (Sunday November 4, 2001): vs. Baltimore Ravens ====
	1	2	3	4	Total
Ravens	0	7	0	6	13
Steelers	3	7	0	0	10

at Heinz Field, Pittsburgh, Pennsylvania

- Game time: 1:00 pm EST
- Game weather: 63 °F (17 °C) (Partly Cloudy)
- Game attendance: 62,906
- Referee: Bob McElwee
- TV announcers: (CBS) Dick Enberg (play by play), Dan Dierdorf (color commentator), Bonnie Bernstein (sideline reporter)

==== Week 9 (Sunday November 11, 2001): at Cleveland Browns ====
	1	2	3	4	OT	Total
Steelers	3	3	3	3	3	15
Browns	9	0	3	0	0	12

at Cleveland Browns Stadium, Cleveland, Ohio

- Game time: 1:00 pm EST
- Game weather: 42 °F (6 °C) (cloudy)
- Game attendance: 73,218
- Referee: Dick Hantak
- TV announcers: (CBS) Ian Eagle (play by play), Solomon Wilcots (color commentator)

==== Week 10 (Sunday November 18, 2001): vs. Jacksonville Jaguars ====
	1	2	3	4	Total
Jaguars	0	0	7	0	7
Steelers	3	3	7	7	20

at Heinz Field, Pittsburgh, Pennsylvania

- Game time: 4:05 pm EST
- Game weather: 57 °F (14 °C) (Mostly Cloudy)
- Game attendance: 62,644
- Referee: Ron Winter
- TV announcers: (CBS) Ian Eagle (play by play), Solomon Wilcots (color commentator)

==== Week 11 (Sunday November 25, 2001): at Tennessee Titans ====
	1	2	3	4	Total
Steelers	3	7	14	10	34
Titans	7	7	3	7	24

at Adelphia Coliseum, Nashville, Tennessee

- Game time: 1:00 pm EST
- Game weather: 63 °F (17 °C) (sunny)
- Game attendance: 68,801
- Referee: Bill Leavy
- TV announcers: (CBS) Dick Enberg (play by play), Dan Dierdorf (color commentator), Bonnie Bernstein (sideline reporter)

==== Week 12 (Sunday December 2, 2001): vs. Minnesota Vikings ====
	1	2	3	4	Total
Vikings	3	0	0	13	16
Steelers	0	7	14	0	21

at Heinz Field, Pittsburgh, Pennsylvania

- Game time: 1:00 pm EST
- Game weather: 48 °F (9 °C) (Sunny)
- Game attendance: 62,661
- Referee: Tony Corrente
- TV announcers: (Fox) Dick Stockton (play by play), Troy Aikman & Daryl Johnston (color commentators), Pam Oliver (sideline reporter)

==== Week 13 (Sunday December 9, 2001): vs. New York Jets ====
	1	2	3	4	Total
Jets	0	7	0	0	7
Steelers	3	9	0	6	18

at Heinz Field, Pittsburgh, Pennsylvania

- Game time: 4:15 pm EST
- Game weather: 41 °F (5 °C) (Cloudy)
- Game attendance: 62,884
- Referee: Terry McAulay
- TV announcers: (CBS) Greg Gumbel (play by play), Phil Simms (color commentator), Armen Keteyian (sideline reporter)

==== Week 14 (Sunday December 16, 2001): at Baltimore Ravens ====
	1	2	3	4	Total
Steelers	3	10	0	13	26
Ravens	0	7	0	14	21

at PSINet Stadium, Baltimore, Maryland

- Game time: 8:30 pm EST
- Game weather: 42 °F (6 °C)
- Game attendance: 69,506
- Referee: Tom White
- TV announcers: (ESPN) Mike Patrick (play by play), Joe Theismann & Paul Maguire (color commentators), Suzy Kolber (sideline reporter)

==== Week 15 (Sunday December 23, 2001): vs. Detroit Lions ====
	1	2	3	4	Total
Lions	7	7	0	0	14
Steelers	14	13	10	10	47

at Heinz Field, Pittsburgh, Pennsylvania

- Game time: 1:00 pm EST
- Game weather: 43 °F (6 °C) (Light Rain)
- Game attendance: 62,809
- Referee: Johnny Grier
- TV announcers: (Fox) Kenny Albert (play by play), Tim Green (color commentator), Jennifer Hammond (sideline reporter)

==== Week 16 (Sunday December 30, 2001): at Cincinnati Bengals ====
	1	2	3	4	OT	Total
Steelers	14	3	6	0	0	23
Bengals	0	10	0	13	3	26

at Paul Brown Stadium, Cincinnati, Ohio

- Game time: 1:00 pm EST
- Game weather: 20 °F (−7 °C) (Partly Cloudy)
- Game attendance: 63,751
- Referee: Jeff Triplette
- TV announcers: (CBS) Gus Johnson (play by play), Brent Jones (color commentator)

==== Week 17 (Sunday January 6, 2002): vs. Cleveland Browns ====
	1	2	3	4	Total
Browns	7	0	0	0	7
Steelers	0	7	14	7	28

at Heinz Field, Pittsburgh, Pennsylvania

- Game time: 1:00 pm EST
- Game weather: 32 °F (0 °C) (Rain & Snow)
- Game attendance: 59,189
- Referee: Bernie Kukar
- TV announcers: (CBS) Gus Johnson (play by play), Brent Jones (color commentator)

== Playoffs ==
=== Schedule ===
Round	Date	Opponent	Result	Record	Venue	Recap
Divisional	January 20	Baltimore Ravens	W 27–10	1–0	Heinz Field	Summary
Conference	January 27	New England Patriots	L 17–24	1–1	Heinz Field	Summary

=== Game summaries ===
==== AFC Divisional Playoff (Sunday January 20, 2002): vs. Baltimore Ravens ====
	1	2	3	4	Total
Ravens	0	3	7	0	10
Steelers	10	10	0	7	27

at Heinz Field, Pittsburgh, Pennsylvania

- Game time: 12:30 pm EST
- Game weather: 30 °F (−1 °C) (Mostly Cloudy)
- Game attendance: 63,976
- Referee: Tony Corrente
- TV announcers: (CBS) Dick Enberg (play by play), Dan Dierdorf (color commentator), Bonnie Bernstein (sideline reporter)

==== AFC Championship Game (Sunday January 27, 2002): vs. New England Patriots ====
	1	2	3	4	Total
Patriots	7	7	7	3	24
Steelers	0	3	14	0	17

at Heinz Field, Pittsburgh, Pennsylvania

- Game time: 12:30 pm EST
- Game weather: 57 °F (14 °C) (Mostly Cloudy)
- Game attendance: 64,704
- Referee: Ed Hochuli
- TV announcers: (CBS) Greg Gumbel (play by play), Phil Simms (color commentator), Armen Keteyian & Bonnie Bernstein (sideline reporters)

== Honors and awards ==
=== Pro Bowl Representatives ===
See: 2002 Pro Bowl

- No. 10 Kordell Stewart-Quarterback
- No. 36 Jerome Bettis-Running Back
- No. 66 Alan Faneca-Offensive Guard
- No. 86 Hines Ward-Wide Receiver
- No. 92 Jason Gildon-Outside Linebacker
- No. 97 Kendrell Bell-Inside Linebacker (as "need" player)
