= Kendrell Bell =

American football player (born 1978)

No. 97, 99
- Position: Linebacker

Personal information
- Born: July 2, 1978 (age 48); Augusta, Georgia, U.S.
- Listed height: 6 ft 1 in (1.85 m)
- Listed weight: 245 lb (111 kg)

Career information
- High school: Laney (Augusta)
- College: Georgia
- NFL draft: 2001: 2nd round, 39th overall pick

Career history
- Pittsburgh Steelers (2001–2004); Kansas City Chiefs (2005–2007)

Awards and highlights
- NFL Defensive Rookie of the Year (2001); Second-team All-Pro (2001); Pro Bowl (2001); PFWA All-Rookie Team (2001); Second-team All-SEC (1999)

Career NFL statistics
- Total tackles: 338
- Sacks: 20.5
- Forced fumbles: 2
- Fumble recoveries: 2
- Interceptions: 1
- Stats at Pro Football Reference

Kendrell Alexander Bell (born July 2, 1978) is an American former professional football player who was a linebacker in the National Football League (NFL). He played college football for the Georgia Bulldogs and was selected by the Pittsburgh Steelers in the second round of the 2001 NFL draft. In his first year with the Steelers, Bell was named NFL Defensive Rookie of the Year. He later played for the Kansas City Chiefs before retiring following the 2007 season.

== Early life ==
Bell attended Lucy Craft Laney High School in Augusta, Georgia. He was a three-sport star in football, basketball, and track and field. In football, he was an All-State selection and won Atlanta Journal All-South honors. In track & field, he was ranked fifth in the state in the shot put as a senior.

In a 2024 retrospective interview with Steelers play-by-play announcer Rob King, Bell mentioned that he was more into track and field than football and that his brother was more knowledgeable about the NFL, being familiar with Blitzburgh-era linebackers Greg Lloyd and Levon Kirkland through his brother.

== College career ==
=== Junior college years ===
Bell attended Middle Georgia Junior College for two years. He was a two-time Super Prep JUCO 100 selection. As a freshman, he played fullback and finished the season with 689 rushing yards. As a sophomore, he garnered six sacks and 132 tackles, and helped lead his defensive unit to a No.1 ranking in the nation.

=== NCAA college years ===
Bell attended the University of Georgia and was a child and family development major and a letterman in football. In football, he finished his career with 153 tackles (10 for a loss), four interceptions, seven sacks, five forced fumbles, and two fumble recoveries.

== Professional career ==
Pre-draft measurables
Height	Weight	Arm length	Hand span	40-yard dash	10-yard split	20-yard split	20-yard shuttle	Three-cone drill	Vertical jump	Broad jump	Bench press
6 ft 1 1/4 in (1.86 m)	234 lb (106 kg)	32 in (0.81 m)	10 1/2 in (0.27 m)	4.62 s	1.60 s	2.64 s	4.50 s	7.25 s	38.5 in (0.98 m)	10 ft 4 in (3.15 m)	24 reps
All values from NFL Combine

=== Pittsburgh Steelers ===
Bell became a starter at inside linebacker as a rookie in 2001 and played in all 16 regular-season games for Pittsburgh. He finished the season with nine sacks and was voted the Associated Press NFL Defensive Rookie of the Year. The Steelers finished the 2001 regular season with a 13–3 record and advanced to the AFC Championship Game after defeating the Baltimore Ravens in the divisional round. In the AFC Championship Game against the New England Patriots, Bell recorded eight tackles and one sack in Pittsburgh's 24–17 loss.

Bell's 2002 season was affected by a high-ankle sprain. He left the season opener against New England after limited action and later returned against the Indianapolis Colts. He missed four games during the season and aggravated the injury while playing through it, including during Pittsburgh's postseason run. Bell played 12 regular-season games in 2002, recording four sacks, and returned to play all 16 games in 2003, recording five sacks.

In 2004, Bell was limited to three games because of injuries, including shoulder and groin problems that required surgery for a sports hernia. His contract expired after the season, and he signed a seven-year contract with the Kansas City Chiefs in March 2005.

=== Kansas City Chiefs ===
Bell signed with the Kansas City Chiefs as a free agent on March 8, 2005, agreeing to a seven-year contract. He played three seasons with Kansas City from 2005 to 2007, appearing in 43 regular-season games and recording 2.5 sacks with the team. Following the 2007 season, the Chiefs informed Bell that he would be released as part of a series of veteran roster moves. He did not play in the NFL again; in a later interview, Bell said his shoulder injury ended his career.

== NFL career statistics ==
Legend
**Bold**	Career high

=== Regular season ===
Year	Team	Games		Tackles					Interceptions					Fumbles			
Year	Team	GP	GS	Cmb	Solo	Ast	Sck	TFL	Int	Yds	TD	Lng	PD	FF	FR	Yds	TD
2001	PIT	16	16	82	69	13	**9.0**	**23**	0	0	0	0	1	**1**	0	0	0
2002	PIT	12	12	50	37	13	4.0	10	0	0	0	0	2	0	**1**	0	0
2003	PIT	16	16	**100**	**81**	**19**	5.0	17	**1**	**61**	0	**61**	**3**	**1**	**1**	0	0
2004	PIT	3	0	8	6	2	0.0	2	0	0	0	0	0	0	0	0	0
2005	KAN	16	14	41	32	9	1.5	3	0	0	0	0	0	0	0	0	0
2006	KAN	16	14	49	43	6	1.0	7	0	0	0	0	0	0	0	0	0
2007	KAN	11	0	8	6	2	0.0	0	0	0	0	0	0	0	0	0	0
		90	72	338	274	64	20.5	62	1	61	0	61	6	2	2	0	0

=== Playoffs ===
Year	Team	Games		Tackles					Interceptions					Fumbles			
Year	Team	GP	GS	Cmb	Solo	Ast	Sck	TFL	Int	Yds	TD	Lng	PD	FF	FR	Yds	TD
2001	PIT	2	2	**14**	**12**	2	**1.0**	**3**	0	0	0	0	**2**	0	0	0	0
2002	PIT	2	1	11	8	**3**	0.0	2	0	0	0	0	1	0	0	0	0
2006	KAN	1	0	0	0	0	0.0	0	0	0	0	0	0	0	0	0	0
		5	3	25	20	5	1.0	5	0	0	0	0	3	0	0	0	0

== Personal life ==
Bell has four children, including a son currently playing high school football. Bell cited Joey Porter, Brett Keisel, Rodney Bailey, and a then-recently deceased Clark Haggans as his closest friends on the Steelers.
