= Clark Haggans =

American football player (1977–2023)

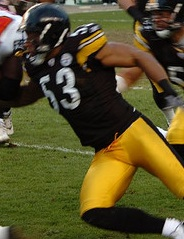
- Haggans with the Pittsburgh Steelers in 2006

No. 53, 51
- Position: Linebacker

Personal information
- Born: January 10, 1977; Torrance, California, U.S.
- Died: June 17, 2023 (aged 46); Fort Collins, Colorado, U.S.
- Listed height: 6 ft 4 in (1.93 m)
- Listed weight: 243 lb (110 kg)

Career information
- High school: Palos Verdes Peninsula (Rolling Hills Estates, California)
- College: Colorado State
- NFL draft: 2000: 5th round, 137th overall pick

Career history
- Pittsburgh Steelers (2000−2007); Arizona Cardinals (2008−2011); San Francisco 49ers (2012)

Awards and highlights
- Super Bowl champion (XL); First-team All-Mountain West (1999); Colorado State University Athletics Hall of Fame

Career NFL statistics
- Total tackles: 520
- Sacks: 46.5
- Forced fumbles: 16
- Fumble recoveries: 5
- Interceptions: 1
- Stats at Pro Football Reference

Clark Cromwell Haggans (January 10, 1977 – June 17, 2023) was an American professional football player who was a linebacker in the National Football League (NFL). He played college football for the Colorado State Rams as a defensive end, and was selected by the Pittsburgh Steelers in the fifth round of the 2000 NFL draft. Haggans played in the NFL from 2000 through 2012 for the Steelers, Arizona Cardinals and San Francisco 49ers.

Haggans earned a Super Bowl ring with the Steelers in Super Bowl XL.

== College career ==
Haggans played defensive end at Colorado State University. He was a productive pass rusher at Colorado State, where he walked on as a freshman, eventually earning a scholarship. He was a teammate of former Steelers teammate Joey Porter and former Cincinnati Bengals linebacker Adrian Ross. Haggans holds the Colorado State all-time sack record to this day, with 33 sacks recorded. He was inducted into the Colorado State University Athletics Hall of Fame in 2015.

== Professional career ==
Pre-draft measurables
Height	Weight	Arm length	Hand span	40-yard dash	10-yard split	20-yard split	20-yard shuttle	Three-cone drill	Vertical jump	Broad jump	Bench press
6 ft 3 3/8 in (1.91 m)	253 lb (115 kg)	32 1/4 in (0.82 m)	9 5/8 in (0.24 m)	4.98 s	1.67 s	2.82 s	4.21 s	7.12 s	31.5 in (0.80 m)	9 ft 1 in (2.77 m)	20 reps
All values from NFL Combine

=== Pittsburgh Steelers ===
The Steelers selected Haggans out of the fifth round of the 2000 NFL draft. He became a regular starter at left outside linebacker in 2004 when the team released long-time starter Jason Gildon.

Haggans recorded six quarterback sacks in 2004, and had nine sacks during the 2005 regular season. Haggans was second on the Steelers defense in tackles for Super Bowl XL, and also recorded a sack, helping the Steelers defeat the Seattle Seahawks. In 2008, Haggans became an unrestricted free agent.

=== Arizona Cardinals ===
On March 26, 2008, Haggans agreed to a one-year contract with the Arizona Cardinals. He was placed on injured reserve with a foot injury on December 19, ending his season. Without Haggans, the Cardinals would reach Super Bowl XLIII, but would lose to his old team, the Pittsburgh Steelers, 27−23.

An unrestricted free agent in the 2009 offseason, Haggans was re-signed to a three-year contract by the Cardinals on March 17. In 2009, he would go on to register 74 tackles, 5 sacks, and 2 forced fumbles in 16 games played. In 2010, he had 47 tackles, 5 sacks, and 1 forced fumble in 13 games. In 2011, he reunited with Ray Horton who was hired as the new Arizona Cardinals defensive coordinator to implement the Pittsburgh Steelers style defense at Arizona.

Haggans re-signed with the Cardinals on June 5, 2012, on a one-year deal.

=== San Francisco 49ers ===
On September 2, 2012, Haggans agreed to a one-year contract with the San Francisco 49ers. The 49ers finished the 2012 NFL season with an 11−4−1 record and reached Super Bowl XLVII, but lost 34−31 to the Baltimore Ravens.

== NFL career statistics ==
Legend
**Bold**	Career high

=== Regular season ===
Year	Team	Games		Tackles					Interceptions					Fumbles			
Year	Team	GP	GS	Cmb	Solo	Ast	Sck	TFL	Int	Yds	TD	Lng	PD	FF	FR	Yds	TD
2000	PIT	2	0	0	0	0	0.0	0	0	0	0	0	0	0	0	0	0
2001	PIT	16	1	22	12	10	0.0	0	0	0	0	0	0	1	0	0	0
2002	PIT	16	1	44	29	15	6.5	4	0	0	0	0	**8**	2	0	0	0
2003	PIT	16	2	33	24	9	1.0	0	0	0	0	0	1	1	0	0	0
2004	PIT	13	13	37	29	8	6.0	7	0	0	0	0	1	2	**1**	0	0
2005	PIT	13	13	61	42	19	**9.0**	7	0	0	0	0	2	**4**	0	0	0
2006	PIT	15	15	**77**	52	**25**	6.0	**9**	**1**	0	0	0	4	2	**1**	0	0
2007	PIT	16	16	58	37	21	4.0	4	0	0	0	0	1	0	**1**	0	0
2008	ARI	11	0	19	18	1	1.0	2	0	0	0	0	2	0	**1**	0	0
2009	ARI	16	14	74	**57**	17	5.0	5	0	0	0	0	1	2	0	0	0
2010	ARI	13	13	47	38	9	5.0	6	0	0	0	0	2	1	0	0	0
2011	ARI	16	16	46	30	16	3.0	5	0	0	0	0	2	1	**1**	0	0
2012	SFO	9	0	2	2	0	0.0	0	0	0	0	0	0	0	0	0	0
		172	104	520	370	150	46.5	49	1	0	0	0	24	16	5	0	0

=== Playoffs ===
Year	Team	Games		Tackles					Interceptions					Fumbles			
Year	Team	GP	GS	Cmb	Solo	Ast	Sck	TFL	Int	Yds	TD	Lng	PD	FF	FR	Yds	TD
2001	PIT	2	0	2	2	0	0.0	0	0	0	0	0	0	0	0	0	0
2002	PIT	2	1	4	3	1	0.0	0	0	0	0	0	0	0	0	0	0
2004	PIT	2	2	7	3	**4**	**2.0**	1	0	0	0	0	**1**	0	0	0	0
2005	PIT	4	4	**18**	**14**	**4**	1.5	**2**	0	0	0	0	**1**	0	0	0	0
2007	PIT	1	1	1	1	0	0.0	0	0	0	0	0	0	0	0	0	0
2009	ARI	2	2	4	3	1	0.0	0	0	0	0	0	0	0	0	0	0
2012	SFO	2	0	0	0	0	0.0	0	0	0	0	0	0	0	0	0	0
		15	10	36	26	10	3.5	3	0	0	0	0	2	0	0	0	0

== Personal life and death ==
Haggans played football, basketball, and track at Palos Verdes Peninsula High School (PVPHS) in Southern California, earning three letters in each sport. During his freshman and sophomore years, he was on football teams that went undefeated. In 1993 and 1994, he was named all-league as a tight end and defensive tackle, while also earning all-division honors. In 1994, Haggans helped lead PVPHS's varsity team to a league title. He had a son named Damon and a daughter named Alianna. He majored in art at Colorado State.

Haggans died on June 17, 2023, at the age of 46. His death was attributed to chronic alcohol use.

=== Charity ===
In 2012, Haggans became the first NFL player to support the Black Out Child Abuse Campaign. Black Out Child Abuse, Inc. is a 501(c)3 non-profit foundation, with offices in Westerville, OH, was founded in 2012 and serves families and organizations across the country; bringing education, assistance and support to those in need. Haggans wore blackout paint as opposed to the stick on in support of this cause.
