= Casey Hampton =

American football player (born 1977)

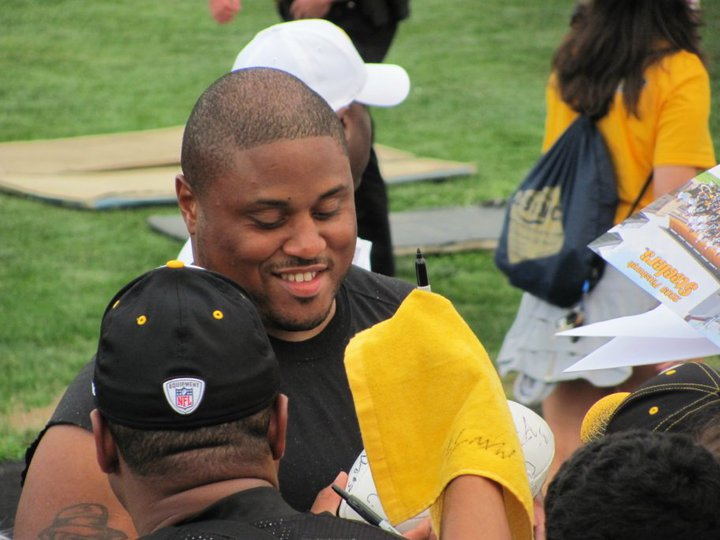
- Hampton with the Pittsburgh Steelers in 2016

No. 98
- Position: Nose tackle

Personal information
- Born: September 3, 1977 (age 49); Galveston, Texas, U.S.
- Listed height: 6 ft 1 in (1.85 m)
- Listed weight: 325 lb (147 kg)

Career information
- High school: Ball (Galveston)
- College: Texas (1996–2000)
- NFL draft: 2001: 1st round, 19th overall pick

Career history
- Pittsburgh Steelers (2001–2012)

Awards and highlights
- 2× Super Bowl champion (XL, XLIII); 5× Pro Bowl (2003, 2005–2007, 2009); Pittsburgh Steelers All-Time Team; Pittsburgh Steelers Hall of Honor; Big 12 Defensive Player of the Year (2000); Consensus All-American (2000); First-team All-American (1999); 2× First-team All-Big 12 (1999, 2000); Second-team All-Big 12 (1998); 1999 Cotton Bowl Classic champion

Career NFL statistics
- Total tackles: 398
- Sacks: 9
- Forced fumbles: 4
- Fumble recoveries: 2
- Stats at Pro Football Reference

Casey Hampton Jr. (born September 3, 1977) is an American former professional football player who was a five-time Pro Bowl nose tackle and two-time Super Bowl champion over twelve seasons with the Pittsburgh Steelers of the National Football League (NFL). Prior to that he was an All-American college football player for the Texas Longhorns and a first round pick of the Steelers in the 2001 NFL draft.

== Early life ==
Hampton was born in Galveston, Texas. He attended Ball High School in Galveston, Texas, and was a letterman in football and track. He was twice named as the District Defensive Player of the Year, and as a senior, he was a Texas Class 5A All-State first-team selection. His Ball High jersey number (No. 63) was retired at a dinner and parade on April 6, 2009. Hampton is the only football player in school history to receive such an honor.

In track & field, Hampton was one of the state's top performers in the throwing events. He had top throws of 16.13 meters in the shot put and 48.08 meters in the discus throw.

== College career ==
Hampton attended the University of Texas, and started 37 consecutive games for the Texas Longhorns football team between 1997 and 2000. He became the first defensive lineman to lead the team in tackles two consecutive seasons (1999–2000), and recorded 329 tackles (177 solos) to rank 11th on the school's all-time list. Hampton registered 56 quarterback pressures and caused nine fumbles in his college career. He earned consensus first-team All-American recognition as a senior, having received first-team honors from the Football Writers Association of America, The Sporting News, the Walter Camp Foundation. He was also a first-team All-Big 12 Conference selection and the Big 12 Defensive Player of the Year by the Conference Coaches.

Hampton was an All-America first-team selection by the Football Writers Association and Associated Press as a junior in 1999. In 1998, he was named the team's Most Consistent Defensive Player and started every game. That season, he recorded 60 tackles (29 solos) with two sacks and eight stops for losses and registered six quarterback pressures, five pass deflections and recovered one fumble. He also appeared in three games in 1997 before being granted a medical redshirt but played in every game as a true freshman in 1996, starting six at nose guard and recorded 77 tackles (51 solos), one sack and seven stops for losses. In his freshman season, he also had three quarterback pressures and a forced fumble. Hampton majored in history.

In 2000, The Daily Texan, the student daily paper at Texas, characterized Hampton as "relentless," even quoting Hampton. "The way I see it, you never know when your last play is going to be," Texas' star defensive tackle said. "So you should go hard all the time. There's no reason to take a play off.." At the time, Hampton was 6'1 and 325 lbs and safety Greg Brown said "I have never seen him take a down off, he's just so intent on destroying people that he never takes time to rest. It's gotta be a gift." Hampton played with Shaun Rogers, a 2nd round pick of the Detroit Lions in 2001 and a Longhorn from 1997 to 2000; and after Hampton was quoted saying "No one guy can block me. Two guys can probably get it done but never one guy. I can always overpower one," the Daily Texan printed this: "He's says he's never even been caked. Ever," fellow defensive tackle Rogers said. "He says he wasn't even caked in junior high, but I, at least, am humble enough to say that I might have been once or twice. So I'd say some of what he says is questionable."

== Professional career ==
Pre-draft measurables
Height	Weight	Arm length	Hand span	40-yard dash	Bench press
6 ft 1 1/4 in (1.86 m)	314 lb (142 kg)	31 1/4 in (0.79 m)	9 1/2 in (0.24 m)	5.25 s	34 reps
All values are from NFL Combine

=== 2001 ===
The Pittsburgh Steelers selected Hampton in the first round (19th overall) of the 2001 NFL draft. Hampton was the fifth defensive tackle drafted in 2001.

On July 22, 2001, the Pittsburgh Steelers signed Hampton to a five-year, $6.80 million contract with a signing bonus of $3.10 million.

Throughout training camp, he competed for the job as the starting nose tackle against Kendrick Clancy. Head coach Bill Cowher named Hampton the backup nose tackle behind Kendrick Clancy to start the regular season.

He made his professional regular season debut in the Pittsburgh Steelers' season-opening 21–3 loss at the Jacksonville Jaguars. On October 26, 2001, Pittsburgh Steelers' head coach Bill Cowher named Hampton the starting nose tackle for the remainder of the season, but stated he would still be rotated by Kendrick Clancy. On October 29, 2001, Hampton earned his first career start and recorded two combined tackles during a 34–7 victory against the Tennessee Titans in Week 7. In Week 9, he collected a season-high four combined tackles and made his first career sack on quarterback Tim Couch in the Steelers' 15–12 win at the Cleveland Browns. He finished his rookie season with 22 combined tackles (nine solo) and a sack in 16 games and 11 starts. The Pittsburgh Steelers' defense was ranked as the No. 1 defense overall and also finished first against the run.

The Pittsburgh Steelers finished first in the AFC Central with a 13–3 record and clinched a playoff berth. On January 20, 2002, Hampton started in his first career playoff game and recorded three combined tackles in a 27–10 victory against the Baltimore Ravens in the AFC Divisional Round. The following week, he made two combined tackles in the Steelers' 24–17 loss to the New England Patriots in the AFC Championship Game.

=== 2002 ===
Hampton entered training camp slated as the starting nose tackle and was officially named the starter to start the 2002 regular season. Defensive coordinator Tim Lewis also retained Aaron Smith and Kimo von Oelhoffen as the starting defensive ends. He started in the Pittsburgh Steelers' season-opener at the New England Patriots and made three combined tackles in their 30–14 loss. In Week 4, Hampton collected a season-high six combined tackles during a 16–13 win against the Cleveland Browns. In Week 16, he collected two combined tackles, two forced fumbles, and had a season-high two sacks in the Steelers' 17–7 victory at the Tampa Bay Buccaneers. Hampton forced a fumble by fullback Mike Alstott and recovered it for the first fumble recovery of his career in the second quarter. He also had a strip/sack on quarterback Rob Johnson and the ball was recovered by teammate Kendrell Bell to stop a potential touchdown on the Steelers' five-yard line in the third quarter. Hampton also sacked quarterback Shaun King and earned his first multi-sack game of his career. He finished his second season with 40 combined tackles (23 solo), two sacks, and two forced fumbles in 16 games and 15 starts.

=== 2003 ===
Hampton, Aaron Smith, and Kimo von Oelhoffen returned as the starting defensive line to start the 2003 regular season. On September 14, 2003, Hampton collected a season-high three solo tackles and sacked quarterback Trent Green in a 41–20 loss at the Kansas City Chiefs in Week 2. In Week 14, he collected a season-high four combined tackles during a 6–0 loss at the New York Jets. On December 18, 2003, Hampton was voted to the 2004 Pro Bowl and earned his first career Pro Bowl selection. Hampton started all 16 regular season games in 2003 and made 39 combined tackles (27 solo), a pass deflection, and a sack. The Pittsburgh Steelers finished third in the AFC North with a 6–10 record and did not qualify for the playoffs.

=== 2004 ===
On January 8, 2004, the Pittsburgh Steelers fired defensive coordinator Tim Lewis. The Pittsburgh Steelers' new defensive coordinator, Dick LeBeau, retained Hampton as the starting nose tackle, alongside defensive ends Aaron Smith and Kimo von Oelhoffen. In Week 2, he collected a season-high five combined tackles during a 30–13 loss at the Baltimore Ravens. On October 17, 2004, Hampton made one solo tackle before exiting late in the fourth quarter of a 24–20 victory at the Dallas Cowboys. On October 20, 2004, the Pittsburgh Steelers placed Hampton on season-ending injured reserve due to a torn ACL in his right knee. Hampton finished the season with 15 combined tackles (eight solo) in six games and six starts.

=== 2005 ===
On August 22, 2005, the Pittsburgh Steelers signed Hampton to a five-year, $22.80 million contract extension with a signing bonus of $4 million.

Hampton returned as the starter and anchored the defensive line in 2005, along with Smith and von Oelhoffen. On October 31, 2005, Hampton recorded a season-high five combined tackles during the Steelers' 20–19 victory against the Baltimore Ravens in Week 8. He finished the season with 42 combined tackles (25 solo) in 16 games and 15 starts.

The Pittsburgh Steelers finished second in the AFC North and clinched a wildcard berth. On January 8, 2006, Hampton recorded two solo tackles during a 31–17 victory at the Cincinnati Bengals in the AFC Wildcard Game. On January 26, 2006, Hampton was selected to play in the 2006 Pro Bowl as a late replacement for New England Patriots' defensive end Richard Seymour, who was unable to participate due to an injury. The Pittsburgh Steelers reached Super Bowl XL after defeating the Indianapolis Colts 21–18 in the AFC Divisional Round and the Denver Broncos 34–17 in the AFC Championship Game. On February 5, 2006, Hampton recorded four solo tackles and sacked quarterback Matt Hasselbeck as the Steelers defeated the Seattle Seahawks 21–10 in Super Bowl XL.

=== 2006 ===
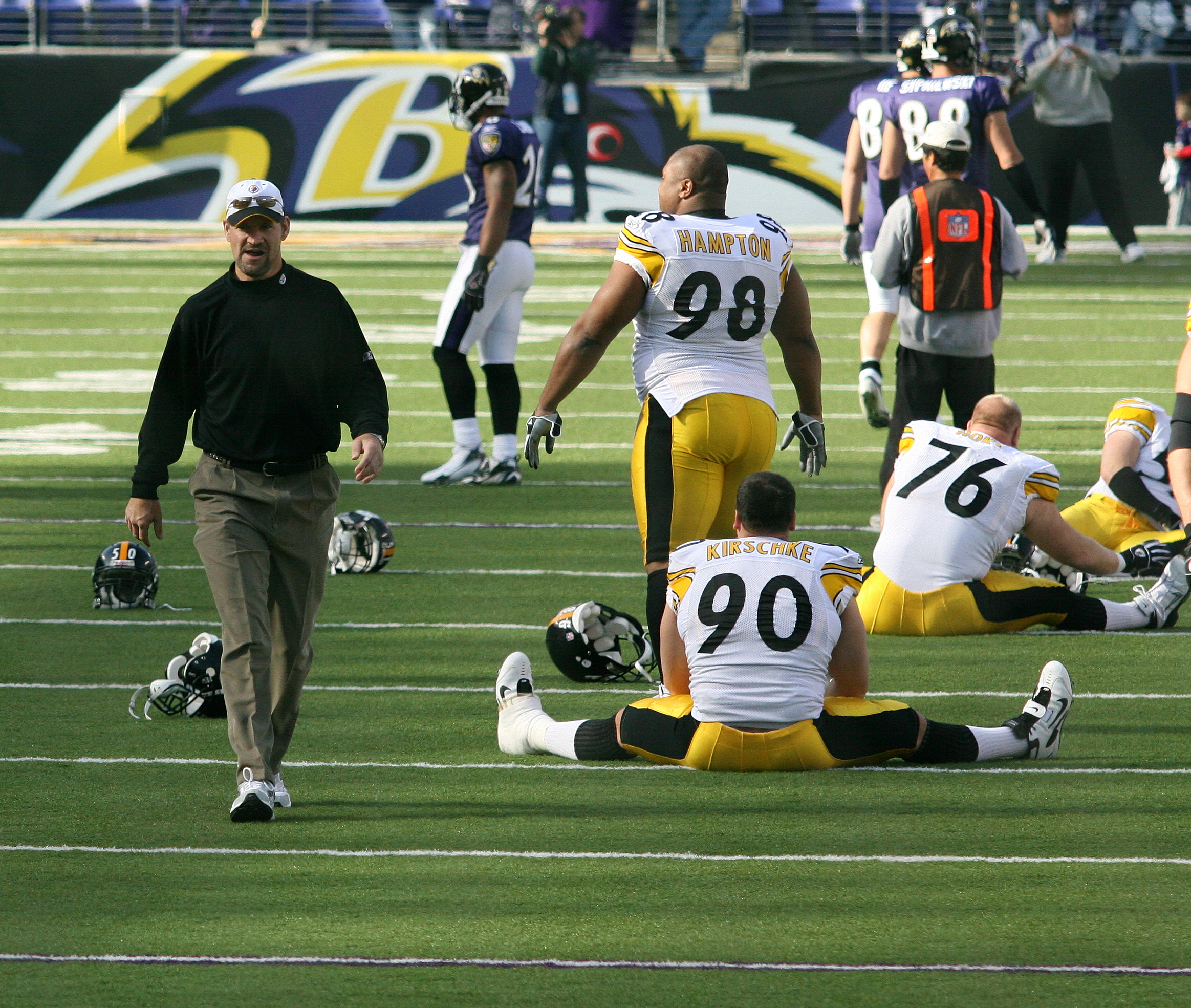
Hampton warming up with the Steelers in November 2006

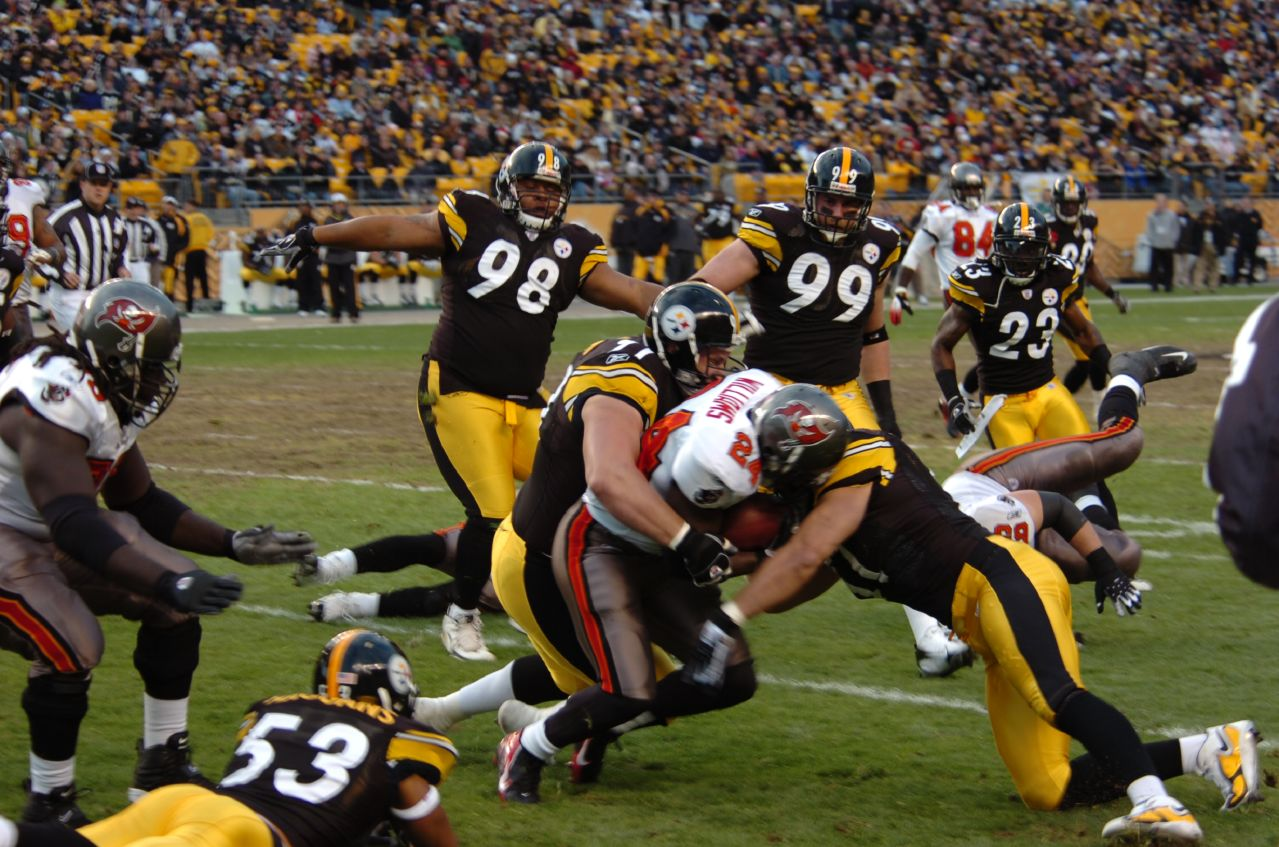
Hampton (98) during a game against the Tampa Bay Buccaneers in 2006

Hampton returned as the starting nose tackle in 2006 and teamed with defensive ends Aaron Smith and Brett Kiesel. He was inactive during the Steelers' Week 8 loss at the Oakland Raiders after injuring his hamstring the previous week. In Week 8, he collected a season-high six combined tackles and deflected a pass during a 38–31 win against the New Orleans Saints. On December 19, 2006, Hampton was named to the 2007 Pro Bowl. He completed the season with 40 combined tackles (25 solo) and a pass deflection in 15 games and 15 starts.

=== 2007 ===
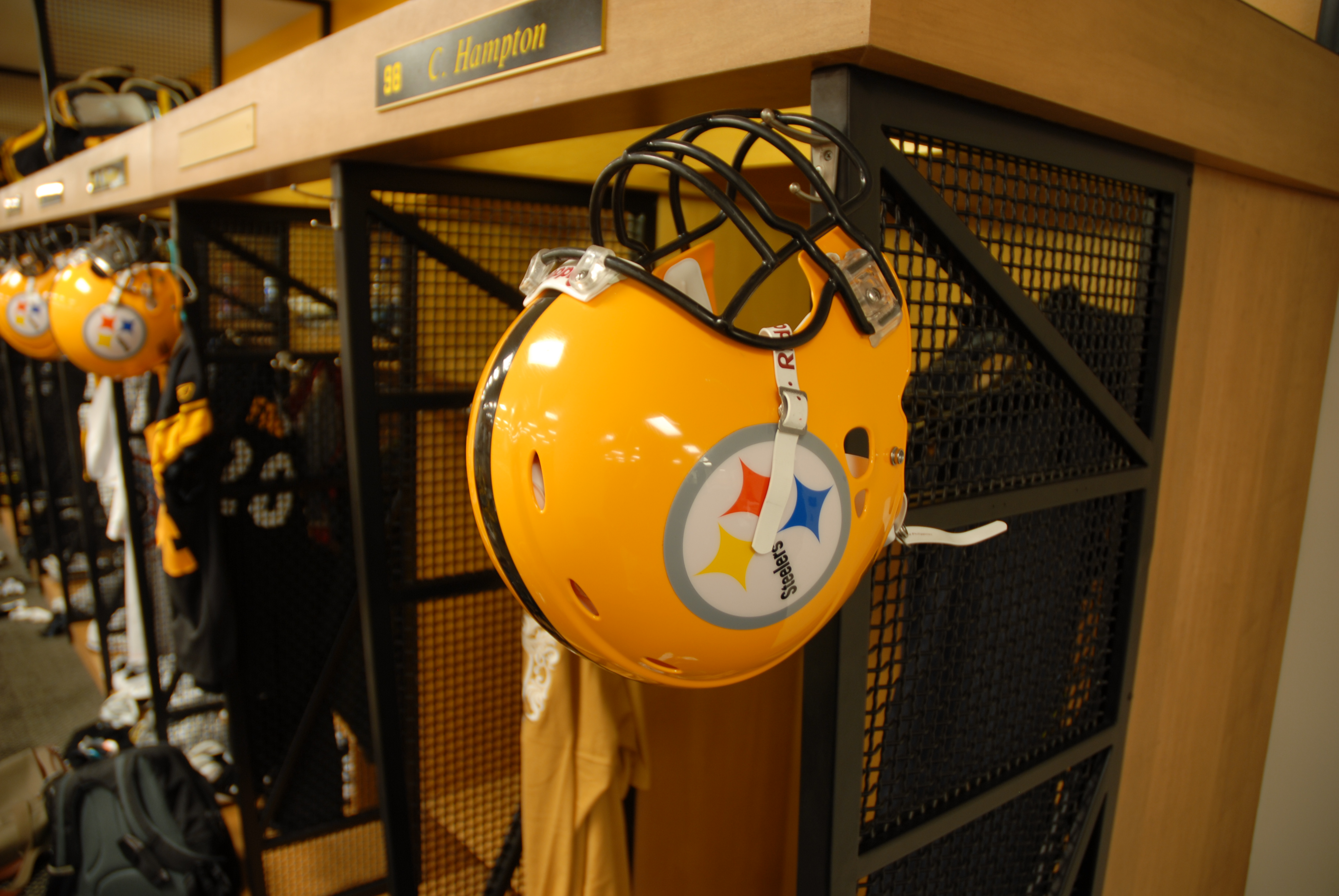
Hampton's locker at Heinz Field in 2007

On January 5, 2007, Pittsburgh Steelers' head coach Bill Cowher announced his retirement. The Pittsburgh Steelers hired Minnesota Vikings' defensive coordinator Mike Tomlin. Tomlin retained defensive coordinator Dick LeBeau and named Hampton the starting nose tackle to start the regular season. Hampton was inactive during the Steelers' Week 5 victory against the Seattle Seahawks due to a hamstring injury. On December 16, 2007, Hampton recorded a career-high eight combined tackles during a 29–22 loss to the Jacksonville Jaguars in Week 15. Hampton finished the season with 33 combined tackles (17 solo) and was credited with half a sack in 15 games and 15 starts.

=== 2008 ===
Hampton, Kiesel, and Smith returned as the starting defensive linemen for the third consecutive season. He missed three consecutive games (Weeks 4–7) due to a groin injury. Hampton returned in Week 8 and recorded a season-high six combined tackles during a 21–14 loss to the New York Giants. On November 30, 2008, he made two solo tackles and sacked quarterback matt Cassel during the Steelers' 33–10 win at the New England Patriots. He finished the season in 2008 with 22 combined tackles (13 solo), a pass deflection, and a sack in 13 games and 13 starts.

The Pittsburgh Steelers finished first in the AFC North with a 12–4 record and earned a playoff berth with a first round bye. The Steelers reached Super Bowl XLIII after defeating the San Diego Chargers 35–24 in the AFC Divisional Round and the Baltimore Ravens 23–14 in the AFC Championship Game. On February 1, 2009, Hampton started in Super Bowl XLIII and made two combined tackles as the Steelers defeated the Arizona Cardinals 27–23.

=== 2009 ===
Hampton started in the Pittsburgh Steelers' season-opener against the Tennessee Titans and collected a season-high five combined tackles in their 13–10 victory. In Week 3, he made two solo tackles and sacked quarterback Carson Palmer during a 23–20 loss at the Cincinnati Bengals. On December 20, 2009, Hampton tied his season-high of five combined tackles and was credited with half a sack during a 37–36 victory against the Green Bay Packers in Week 15. On December 29, 2009, Hampton was selected to play in the 2010 Pro Bowl. He started in all 16 games in 2009 and finished with career-high 43 combined tackles (23 solo) and a career-high 2.5 sacks.

=== 2010 ===
On February 25, 2010, the Pittsburgh Steelers signed Hampton to a three-year, $21.30 million contract that includes $11 million guaranteed and a signing bonus of $6.50 million.

Defensive coordinator Dick LeBeau retained Hampton, Kiesel, and Smith as the starting defensive linemen for the sixth consecutive season. He was inactive for the Steelers' Week 2 victory at the Tennessee Titans due to a hamstring injury. On October 3, 2010, Hampton made one solo tackle and sacked quarterback Joe Flacco in a 17–14 loss to the Baltimore Ravens in Week 4. In Week 15, he collected a season-high three combined tackles during a 22–17 loss to the New York Jets. He completed the season with 20 combined tackles (ten solo) and a sack in 15 games and 14 starts.

The Pittsburgh Steelers finished atop the AFC North with a 12–4 record and earned a first round bye. The Steelers defeated the Baltimore Ravens 31–24 in the AFC Divisional Round and the New York Jets 24–19 in the AFC Championship Game and reached Super Bowl XLV. On February 6, 2011, Hampton started in Super Bowl XLV and made one solo tackle as the Steelers lost 31–25 against the Green Bay Packers.

=== 2011 ===
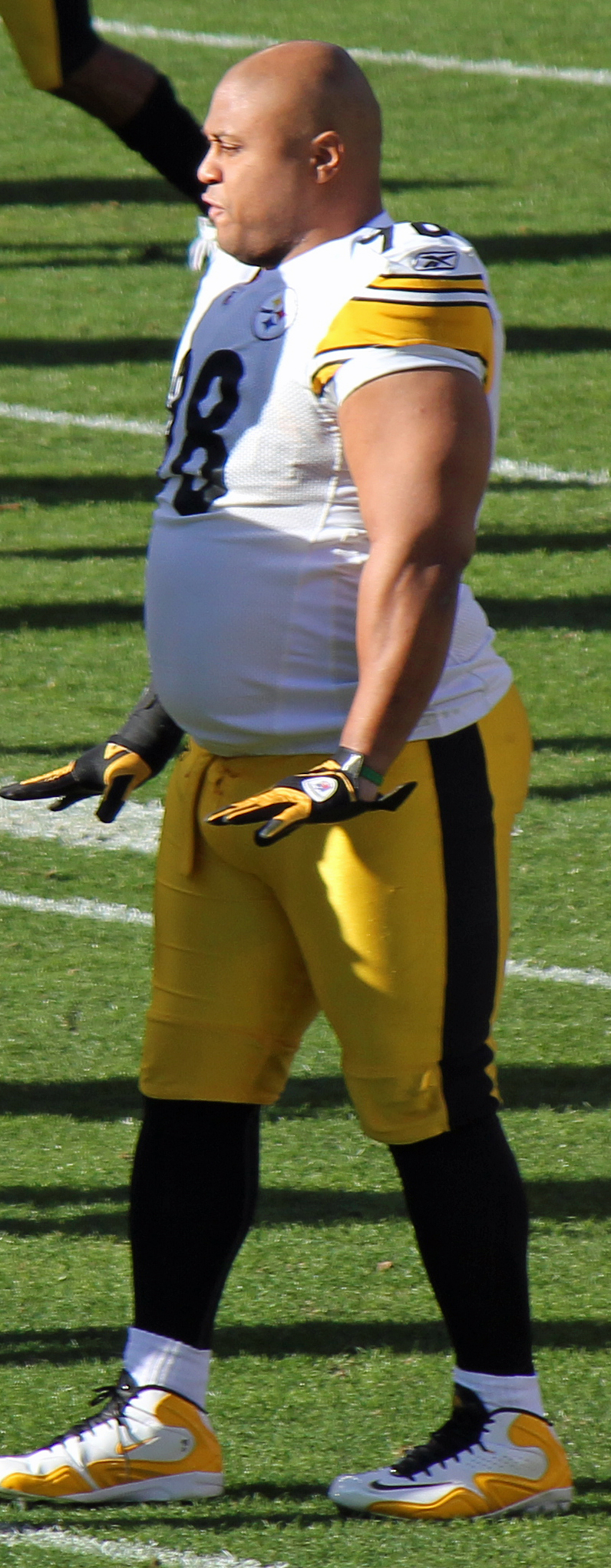
Hampton in 2011

Hampton was sidelined for three games (Weeks 5–7) due to a shoulder injury he sustained the previous week. In Week 14, he collected a season-high six combined tackles in the Steelers' 14–3 victory against the Cleveland Browns. Hampton finished his 11th season with the Pittsburgh Steelers with 31 combined tackles (17 solo) in 13 games and 12 starts.

=== 2012 ===
During the offseason, Hampton underwent surgery on his ACL. On March 15, 2012, Hampton agreed to restructure his contract to remain with the Steelers. His base salary was changed from $4.89 million to $2.80 million. Head coach Mike Tomlin named Hampton the starting nose tackle to start the season, ahead of Steve McLendon. He started alongside Brett Kiesel and Ziggy Hood. In Week 11, he collected a season-high four combined tackles during a 13–10 loss to the Baltimore Ravens. In Week 16, he tied his season-high of four combined tackles during the Steelers' 13–10 loss to the Cincinnati Bengals. He started all 16 games in 2012 and recorded 26 combined tackles (11 solo).

For his career, he played in 157 regular season games, recording 350 tackles, 9.0 sacks, three pass deflected, four forced fumbles, and two recovered fumbles. After retiring, he was nominated to the Pro Football Hall of Fame every year from 2020 to 2025, but has never been selected a semi-finalist.

== NFL career statistics ==
Legend
	Won the Super Bowl
**Bold**	Career high

Year	Team	Games	Comb	Solo	Ast	Sacks	FF	FR	FR Yds	Int	Int Yds	Avg	Lng	TD	PD
2001	PIT	16	30	16	14	1.0	0	**1**	0	0	0	0	0	0	0
2002	PIT	16	**46**	29	17	2.0	**2**	**1**	**36**	0	0	0	0	0	0
2003	PIT	16	39	27	12	1.0	0	0	0	0	0	0	0	0	**2**
2004	PIT	6	15	8	7	0.0	0	0	0	0	0	0	0	0	0
2005	PIT	16	44	27	17	0.0	0	0	0	0	0	0	0	0	0
2006	PIT	15	**46**	**31**	15	0.0	1	0	0	0	0	0	0	0	1
2007	PIT	15	36	19	17	0.5	0	0	0	0	0	0	0	0	0
2008	PIT	13	22	13	9	1.0	0	0	0	0	0	0	0	0	1
2009	PIT	16	43	23	**20**	**2.5**	0	0	0	0	0	0	0	0	0
2010	PIT	15	20	10	10	1.0	1	0	0	0	0	0	0	0	0
2011	PIT	13	31	17	14	0.0	0	0	0	0	0	0	0	0	0
2012	PIT	16	26	11	15	0.0	0	0	0	0	0	0	0	0	0
Career		173	398	231	167	9.0	4	2	36	0	0	0	0	0	4
