= 2002 Pro Bowl =

National Football League all-star game

2002 NFL Pro Bowl
AFC	NFC
38	30
Head coach: Bill Cowher (Pittsburgh Steelers)	Head coach: Andy Reid (Philadelphia Eagles)
	1	2	3	4	Total
AFC	21	7	0	10	38
NFC	13	3	0	14	30
- Date: February 9, 2002
- Stadium: Aloha Stadium; Honolulu, Hawaii
- MVP: Rich Gannon (Oakland Raiders)
- Referee: Ron Blum
- Attendance: 50,301

Ceremonies
- National anthem: Jessica Simpson
- Halftime show: Sugar Ray

TV in the United States
- Network: ABC
- Announcers: Al Michaels, Dan Fouts, Eric Dickerson, and Melissa Stark

The 2002 Pro Bowl was the NFL's all-star game for the 2001 season. The game was played on February 9, 2002, at Aloha Stadium in Honolulu, Hawaii. The final score was AFC 38, NFC 30. Rich Gannon of the Oakland Raiders was the game's MVP.

== AFC roster ==
=== Offense ===
Position	Starter(s)	Reserve(s)	Alternate(s)
Quarterback	12 Rich Gannon, Oakland	12 Tom Brady, New England; 10 Kordell Stewart, Pittsburgh	
Running back	28 Curtis Martin, N.Y. Jets	36 Jerome Bettis, Pittsburgh^{[b]} 31 Priest Holmes, Kansas City	28 Corey Dillon, Cincinnati^{[a]}
Fullback	37 Larry Centers, Buffalo		
Wide receiver	88 Marvin Harrison, Indianapolis; 80 Rod Smith, Denver^{[b]}	81 Tim Brown, Oakland^{[c]} 82 Jimmy Smith, Jacksonville^{[b]}	80 Troy Brown, New England^{[a]} 86 Hines Ward, Pittsburgh^{[a]}
Tight end	88 Tony Gonzalez, Kansas City^{[b]}	82 Shannon Sharpe, Baltimore^{[c]}	85 Ken Dilger, Indianapolis^{[a]} 89 Dwayne Carswell, Denver^{[e]}
Offensive tackle	72 Lincoln Kennedy, Oakland; 75 Jonathan Ogden, Baltimore	71 Walter Jones, Seattle	
Offensive guard	66 Alan Faneca, Pittsburgh; 68 Will Shields, Kansas City	79 Ruben Brown, Buffalo	
Center	68 Kevin Mawae, N.Y. Jets	74 Bruce Matthews, Tennessee	

=== Defense ===
Position	Starter(s)	Reserve(s)	Alternate(s)
Defensive end	94 John Abraham, N.Y. Jets; 75 Marcellus Wiley, San Diego	90 Jevon Kearse, Tennessee	
Defensive tackle	93 Trevor Pryce, Denver^{[b]} 93 John Randle, Seattle	95 Sam Adams, Baltimore^{[c]}	96 Gary Walker, Jacksonville^{[a]}
Outside linebacker	92 Jason Gildon, Pittsburgh; 95 Jamir Miller, Cleveland	55 Junior Seau, San Diego	
Inside linebacker	52 Ray Lewis, Baltimore	54 Zach Thomas, Miami ^{[b]}	56 Al Wilson, Denver^{[a]} 97 Kendrell Bell, Pittsburgh^{[d]}
Cornerback	29 Sam Madison, Miami^{[b]} 24 Charles Woodson, Oakland^{[b]}	24 Deltha O'Neal, Denver^{[c]}	47 Ryan McNeil, San Diego^{[a]}^{[c]} 24 Ty Law, New England^{[a]}
Free safety	26 Rod Woodson, Baltimore		
Strong safety	37 Rodney Harrison, San Diego	36 Lawyer Milloy, New England	

=== Special teams ===
Position	Starter(s)	Reserve(s)	Alternate(s)
Punter	9 Shane Lechler, Oakland		
Placekicker	1 Jason Elam, Denver		
Kick returner	84 Jermaine Lewis, Baltimore		
Special teamer	52 Ian Gold, Denver		

== NFC roster ==
=== Offense ===
Position	Starter(s)	Reserve(s)	Alternate(s)
Quarterback	4 Brett Favre, Green Bay^{[b]}	13 Kurt Warner, St. Louis^{[c]} 5 Jeff Garcia, San Francisco	5 Donovan McNabb, Philadelphia^{[a]}
Running back	28 Marshall Faulk, St. Louis	30 Ahman Green, Green Bay; 20 Garrison Hearst, San Francisco	
Fullback	40 Mike Alstott, Tampa Bay		
Wide receiver	89 David Boston, Arizona; 81 Terrell Owens, San Francisco	80 Isaac Bruce, St. Louis^{[b]} 19 Keyshawn Johnson, Tampa Bay	87 Joe Horn, New Orleans^{[a]}^{[b]} 88 Torry Holt, St. Louis^{[a]}
Tight end	88 Bubba Franks, Green Bay	85 Wesley Walls, Carolina^{[b]}	87 Byron Chamberlain, Minnesota^{[a]}
Offensive tackle	76 Orlando Pace, St. Louis^{[b]} 60 Chris Samuels, Washington	71 James Williams, Chicago^{[c]}	72 Tra Thomas, Philadelphia^{[a]}
Offensive guard	73 Larry Allen, Dallas^{[b]} 65 Ron Stone, N.Y. Giants	65 Ray Brown, San Francisco^{[c]}	62 Adam Timmerman, St. Louis^{[a]}
Center	57 Olin Kreutz, Chicago	78 Matt Birk, Minnesota^{[b]}	62 Jeremy Newberry, San Francisco^{[a]}

=== Defense ===
Position	Starter(s)	Reserve(s)	Alternate(s)
Defensive end	53 Hugh Douglas, Philadelphia; 92 Michael Strahan, N.Y. Giants	91 Robert Porcher, Detroit	
Defensive tackle	97 La'Roi Glover, New Orleans; 99 Warren Sapp, Tampa Bay^{[b]}	97 Bryant Young, San Francisco^{[c]}	92 Ted Washington, Chicago^{[a]}
Outside linebacker	56 LaVar Arrington, Washington; 55 Derrick Brooks, Tampa Bay^{[b]}	98 Jessie Armstead, N.Y. Giants^{[c]}	52 Dexter Coakley, Dallas^{[a]}
Inside linebacker	54 Brian Urlacher, Chicago	54 Jeremiah Trotter, Philadelphia	56 Keith Brooking, Atlanta^{[d]}
Cornerback	20 Ronde Barber, Tampa Bay; 35 Aeneas Williams, St. Louis	23 Troy Vincent, Philadelphia^{[b]}	24 Champ Bailey, Washington^{[a]}
Free safety	21 Brian Dawkins, Philadelphia		
Strong safety	29 Sammy Knight, New Orleans	47 John Lynch, Tampa Bay	

=== Special teams ===
Position	Starter(s)	Reserve(s)	Alternate(s)
Punter	10 Todd Sauerbrun, Carolina		
Placekicker	2 David Akers, Philadelphia		
Kick returner	89 Steve Smith, Carolina		
Special teamer	33 Larry Whigham, Chicago		
Long snapper	89 Chad Lewis, Philadelphia^{[e]}		

Notes:

^{a} Replacement selection due to injury or vacancy
^{b} Injured player; selected but did not play
^{c} Replacement starter; selected as reserve
^{d} "Need player"; named by coach
^{e} Other additional player; added by league

== Number of selections per team ==
AFC team	Selections	NFC team	Selections
Denver Broncos	7	Philadelphia Eagles	8
Baltimore Ravens	6	St. Louis Rams	7
Pittsburgh Steelers	6	San Francisco 49ers	6
Oakland Raiders	5	Tampa Bay Buccaneers	6
New England Patriots	4	Chicago Bears	5
San Diego Chargers	4	Carolina Panthers	3
Kansas City Chiefs	3	Green Bay Packers	3
New York Jets	3	New Orleans Saints	3
Tennessee Titans	3	New York Giants	3
Buffalo Bills	2	Washington Redskins	3
Indianapolis Colts	2	Dallas Cowboys	2
Miami Dolphins	2	Minnesota Vikings	2
Seattle Seahawks	2	Arizona Cardinals	1
Cincinnati Bengals	1	Atlanta Falcons	1
Cleveland Browns	1	Detroit Lions	1
Jacksonville Jaguars	1		
