= 2001 All-Pro Team =

Official list of the best NFL players in 2001

The 2001 All-Pro Team comprises the National Football League players that were named to the Associated Press, Pro Football Writers Association, and The Sporting News All-Pro Teams in 2001. Both first and second teams are listed for the AP team. These are the three teams that are included in Total Football II: The Official Encyclopedia of the National Football League. In 2001 the Pro Football Writers Association and Pro Football Weekly combined their All-pro teams, a practice with continues through 2008. In 2001 the AP did not have a separate “fullback” position. Also, in 2001, the AP returned to choosing two inside linebackers, rather than one.

== Teams ==
Offense
Position	First team	Second team
Quarterback	Kurt Warner, St. Louis Rams (AP, PFWA, TSN)	Brett Favre, Green Bay Packers (AP-2)
Running back	Priest Holmes, Kansas City Chiefs (AP); Curtis Martin, New York Jets (PFWA, TSN); Marshall Faulk, St. Louis Rams (AP, PFWA, TSN)	Ahman Green, Green Bay Packers (AP-2); Curtis Martin, New York Jets (AP-2)
Wide receiver	Terrell Owens, San Francisco 49ers (AP, PFWA, TSN); David Boston, Arizona Cardinals (AP, PFWA, TSN)	Marvin Harrison, Indianapolis Colts (AP-2); Rod Smith, Denver Broncos (AP-2)
Tight end	Tony Gonzalez, Kansas City Chiefs (AP, PFWA, TSN)	Ernie Conwell, St. Louis Rams (AP-2)
Tackle	Orlando Pace, St. Louis Rams (AP, PFWA, TSN); Jonathan Ogden, Baltimore Ravens (PFWA, TSN); Walter Jones, Seattle Seahawks (AP)	James Williams, Chicago Bears (AP-2); Lincoln Kennedy, Oakland Raiders (AP-2t); Jonathan Ogden, Baltimore Ravens (AP-2t)
Guard	Larry Allen, Dallas Cowboys (AP, PFWA, TSN); Alan Faneca, Pittsburgh Steelers (AP, PFWA, TSN)	Adam Timmerman, St. Louis Rams (AP-2); Ray Brown, San Francisco 49ers (AP-2)
Center	Kevin Mawae, New York Jets (AP, PFWA, TSN)	Jeff Hartings, Pittsburgh Steelers (AP-2)

Special teams
Position	First team	Second team
Kicker	David Akers, Philadelphia Eagles (AP, PFWA, TSN)	Jason Elam, Denver Broncos (AP-2)
Punter	Todd Sauerbrun, Carolina Panthers (AP, PFWA, TSN)	Shane Lechler, Oakland Raiders (AP-2)
Kick Returner	Steve Smith, Carolina Panthers (AP, PFWA, TSN)	Jermaine Lewis, Baltimore Ravens (AP-2)
Punt Returner	Troy Brown, New England Patriots (PFWA); Jermaine Lewis, Baltimore Ravens (TSN)	
Special Teams	Larry Whigham, Chicago Bears (PFWA)	

Defense
Position	First team	Second team
Defensive end	John Abraham, New York Jets (AP, PFWA, TSN); Michael Strahan, New York Giants (AP, PFWA, TSN)	Marcellus Wiley, San Diego Chargers (AP-2); Jason Taylor, Miami Dolphins (AP-2)
Defensive tackle	Ted Washington, Chicago Bears (AP, TSN); Warren Sapp, Tampa Bay Buccaneers (AP, PFWA, TSN); Sam Adams, Baltimore Ravens (PFWA)	Bryant Young, San Francisco 49ers (AP-2); Trevor Pryce, Denver Broncos (AP-2)
Inside linebacker	Brian Urlacher, Chicago Bears (AP, PFWA, TSN); Ray Lewis, Baltimore Ravens (AP, TSN)	Zach Thomas, Miami Dolphins (AP-2); Kendrell Bell, Pittsburgh Steelers (AP-2t); Jeremiah Trotter, Philadelphia Eagles (AP-2t)
Outside linebacker	Jason Gildon, Pittsburgh Steelers (AP, PFWA); Jamir Miller, Cleveland Browns (AP, PFWA, TSN)	Derrick Brooks, Tampa Bay Buccaneers (AP-2); LaVar Arrington, Washington Redskins (AP-2)
Cornerback	Rondé Barber, Tampa Bay Buccaneers (AP, PFWA); Aeneas Williams, St. Louis Rams (AP, PFWA, TSN); Charles Woodson, Oakland Raiders (TSN)	Troy Vincent, Philadelphia Eagles (AP-2); Sam Madison, Miami Dolphins (AP-2)
Safety	Brian Dawkins, Philadelphia Eagles (AP, PFWA, TSN); John Lynch, Tampa Bay Buccaneers (PFWA); Rodney Harrison, San Diego Chargers (TSN); Mike Brown, Chicago Bears (AP)	Sammy Knight, New Orleans Saints (AP-2); John Lynch, Tampa Bay Buccaneers (AP-2)

== Key ==
- AP = Associated Press first-team All-Pro
- AP-2 = Associated Press second-team All-Pro
- AP-2t = Tied for second-team All-Pro in the AP vote
- PFWA = Pro Football Writers Association All-NFL
- TSN = The Sporting News All-Pro
