= Rodney Bailey =

American football player (born 1979)

No. 94, 95, 93, 91
- Position: Defensive end

Personal information
- Born: October 7, 1979 (age 47); Cleveland, Ohio, U.S.
- Listed height: 6 ft 3 in (1.91 m)
- Listed weight: 305 lb (138 kg)

Career information
- College: Ohio State
- NFL draft: 2001: 6th round, 181st overall pick

Career history
- Pittsburgh Steelers (2001–2003); New England Patriots (2004); Seattle Seahawks (2005); Pittsburgh Steelers (2006); Arizona Cardinals (2007)

Awards and highlights
- Super Bowl champion (XXXIX)

Career NFL statistics
- Total tackles: 106
- Sacks: 9.5
- Forced fumbles: 1
- Fumble recoveries: 2
- Stats at Pro Football Reference

Rodney Dwayne Bailey (born October 7, 1979) is an American former professional football player who was a defensive end in the National Football League (NFL). He played college football for the Ohio State Buckeyes.

== Early life ==
A native of Cleveland, Ohio, Bailey attended St. Edward High School in nearby Lakewood, Ohio and was a letterman in football. He trucked Marty “King of Singo” Mordarski in a memorable game against Padua. In football, he was named the Cleveland Division I Player of the Year by The Plain Dealer, and was a first-team Division I Associated All-State pick. In addition, he was named the Cleveland Touchdown Club player of the year and was named to numerous high school All-American teams. He graduated from St. Edward in 1997.

== College career ==
Entering Ohio State, Bailey was listed as one of the top 40 high school recruits in United States. Bailey started as a true freshman and started 34 games in total. His senior year, Bailey was named a co-captain, named an all-Big Ten selection and was honored as team defensive player of the year.

Bailey is a graduate of Ohio State University and completed his degree in only 3.5 years.

== Professional career ==
=== 2001 ===
• Drafted in the 6th round by the Pittsburgh Steelers.
• Played all 16 games with one start.
• Recorded 12 tackles (11 solo) and 2 sacks.

=== 2002 ===
• Played all 16 games and 2 postseason games for the Pittsburgh Steelers.
• Recorded 18 tackles (15 solo), 5.5 sacks, and a fumble recovery.

=== 2003 ===
• Played all 16 games for the Pittsburgh Steelers.
• Recorded 9 tackles (6 solo) and 2 sacks.

=== 2004 ===
• Signed to the New England Patriots.
• Spent season on injured reserve.
• Earned a championship ring as a member of the winning team for Super Bowl XXXVIII.

=== 2005 ===
• Signed September 14 to the Seattle Seahawks and played 8 games.
• Recorded 13 tackles (8 solos) and 2 forced fumbles.

=== 2006 ===
• Played in 12 games for the Pittsburgh Steelers.
• Played in 50th game as a member of the Steelers.

=== 2007 ===
• Signed with the Arizona Cardinals.
• Listed on depth chart as defensive tackle, a change from his usual position of defensive end.

== NFL career statistics ==
Legend
**Bold**	Career high

=== Regular season ===
Year	Team	Games		Tackles					Interceptions					Fumbles			
Year	Team	GP	GS	Cmb	Solo	Ast	Sck	TFL	Int	Yds	TD	Lng	PD	FF	FR	Yds	TD
2001	PIT	**16**	**1**	26	14	**12**	2.0	4	0	0	0	0	1	0	0	0	0
2002	PIT	**16**	0	**30**	**21**	9	**5.5**	**8**	0	0	0	0	**2**	0	**1**	0	0
2003	PIT	**16**	0	10	7	3	2.0	4	0	0	0	0	0	0	0	0	0
2005	SEA	8	0	15	9	6	0.0	2	0	0	0	0	0	**1**	**1**	0	0
2006	PIT	12	0	9	3	6	0.0	2	0	0	0	0	1	0	0	0	0
2007	ARI	**16**	0	16	11	5	0.0	0	0	0	0	0	0	0	0	0	0
		84	1	106	65	41	9.5	20	0	0	0	0	4	1	2	0	0

=== Playoffs ===
Year	Team	Games		Tackles					Interceptions					Fumbles			
Year	Team	GP	GS	Cmb	Solo	Ast	Sck	TFL	Int	Yds	TD	Lng	PD	FF	FR	Yds	TD
2001	PIT	**2**	0	0	0	0	0.0	0	0	0	0	0	0	0	0	0	0
2002	PIT	**2**	0	**1**	0	**1**	0.0	0	0	0	0	0	0	0	0	0	0
2005	SEA	1	0	0	0	0	0.0	0	0	0	0	0	0	0	0	0	0
		4	0	1	0	1	0.0	0	0	0	0	0	0	0	0	0	0

== After football ==
In 2009, St. Edward announced that Bailey would be inducted into the school's Athletic Hall of Fame.
