= Mathias Nkwenti =

Cameroonian gridiron football player (born 1978)

No. 78
- Position: Offensive tackle

Personal information
- Born: 11 May 1978 (age 48); Yaoundé, Cameroon

Career information
- High school: Thomas S. Wootton (Rockville, Maryland, U.S.)
- College: Temple (1996–2000)
- NFL draft: 2001: 4th round, 111th overall pick

Career history
- Pittsburgh Steelers (2001–2003); New York Giants (2004)*
- * Offseason or practice squad member only

Career NFL statistics
- Games played: 2
- Stats at Pro Football Reference

Mathias Fru Nkwenti (born 11 May 1978) is a Cameroonian former professional American football offensive tackle who played in the National Football League (NFL). From Cameroon, he moved to the United States at age 10. He played college football for the Temple Owls and was selected by the Pittsburgh Steelers in the fourth round of the 2001 NFL draft. He was a member of the Steelers for three seasons and appeared in two games. He later had a short offseason stint with the New York Giants in 2004.

== Early life ==
Nkwenti was born on 11 May 1978, in Yaoundé, Cameroon. He is fluent in French, English, and the local Mankon dialect. His father, a diplomat, moved the family to the United States when Nkwenti was 10 years old. He attended Thomas S. Wootton High School in Rockville, Maryland, and gained an interest in American football. His parents, unfamiliar with the sport, initially opposed him participating. He said "At first, they didn't want me to play because they didn't know anything about American football. All they knew is you could get hurt ... I had to do some persuading. They finally just gave in and said play it at your own risk."

Nkwenti tried out for the Wootton football team as a junior, with the coaches putting him at tight end and defensive end. Despite his inexperience, he became a top player at tight end and was named all-state at the position. He received significant attention as a recruit and his parents began supporting him: "They finally started hearing I could get a free education in college out of it and they were all for it," he said. In addition to playing football, Nkwenti was also a track and field competitor in high school, placing in the top 30 in the nation in the discus throw as a senior.

However, due to academic scores and a late arrival of Nkwenti's SAT, most schools lost interest in recruiting him. Temple Owls coach Ron Dickerson remained interested in him and Nkwenti signed to play college football there as a defensive lineman.

== College career ==
Nkwenti redshirted as a freshman at Temple in 1996. The following year, he was used as a reserve defensive lineman and finished the season with 17 tackles. Under new coach Bobby Wallace in 1998, he played in 10 games, two as a starter at defensive tackle, and made 19 tackles. He suffered a shoulder injury in 1999 that caused him to miss most of the season. In 2000, as a senior, he was moved to right tackle on the offense by assistant coach Mike Schad. He later said that "My offensive line coach, Mike Schad, was an 11-year veteran in the NFL and I guess he saw something in me I didn't see. From my sophomore year, he was always trying to get me to move to offense. I said fine, what the heck, anything to get on the field as much as possible. I guess it's turned out for the best."

Nkwenti was a key player that helped develop a major offensive turnaround for Temple in 2000. Although they only compiled a record of 4–7, they had a total of 3,412 yards of offense, over 1,000 more than the previous year, when they had 2,250. He said that "If you had to rank colleges in improvement, we might be in the top three. We improved in every possible category." Following the season, he was invited to compete at the Blue–Gray Football Classic all-star game. He graduated from Temple University in May 2001.

== Professional career ==
Nkwenti was reported to have impressed at the 2001 NFL Scouting Combine, where he measured at 6 feet 4 inches (1.93 m) and 285 pounds (129 kg), running a 40-yard dash under 5.0 seconds that was viewed as "extremely fast for a tackle." Prior to the 2001 NFL draft, he was ranked by The Sporting News as the 11th-best offensive lineman available, while being ranked eighth by the publication Ourlads. He ended up being selected in the fourth round (111th overall) of the draft by the Pittsburgh Steelers.

Nkwenti signed a three-year, $1.182 million rookie contract with the Steelers in May 2001. He entered training camp at a weight of 298 pounds (135 kg) and within five weeks, weighed in at 308 pounds (140 kg). He was the backup left tackle to Wayne Gandy and made the final roster. However, Nkwenti ended up being inactive for every regular season and playoff game but one, seeing his only action during the 2001 season in a 13–10 Week 8 loss to the Baltimore Ravens. His appearance made him only the second Cameroonian-born NFL player in history, after Roman Oben. The Steelers finished the season with a record of 13–3 and reached the 2001 AFC Championship Game, where they lost to the New England Patriots 24–17.

Nkwenti was reported as having impressed coaches with his development in 2002. Famed offensive line coach Joe Moore said of him: "He has as much natural talent as anybody I've ever seen in my life." He made the team again in 2002 as a backup, but was inactive for every game. The 2002 Steelers compiled a record of 10–5–1, reaching the divisional round of the playoffs where they lost 34–31 to the Tennessee Titans.

In 2003, Nkwenti made the team for the third consecutive year as a backup. After being inactive for the first three weeks of the season, he was made active for the team's Week 4 game against the Tennessee Titans due to an injury to Marvel Smith, but ended up seeing no playing time in the game. Two weeks later, he was active again for the team's game against the Denver Broncos, where he saw significant action, being used as a left tackle in passing situations while also seeing time at right tackle. However, soon after the game it was determined that he needed surgery to remove a disc fragment in his back that was pressing on a nerve. He was placed on injured reserve on 22 October 2003, ending his season after only one game. The 2003 Steelers finished with a record of 6–10, missing the playoffs. He became an exclusive rights free agent after the season and the team withdrew their $628,000 qualifying offer, which made him a free agent. He concluded his three-year stint with the Steelers having appeared in only two games.

Nkwenti later signed with the New York Giants on 23 June 2004. He was released on 27 July. He later said that his career ended due to his back injury: "I was offered a ton of contracts, but I injured my back. I knew I was done." After his football career, he moved back to Cameroon.
