= Keydrick Vincent =

American football player (born 1978)

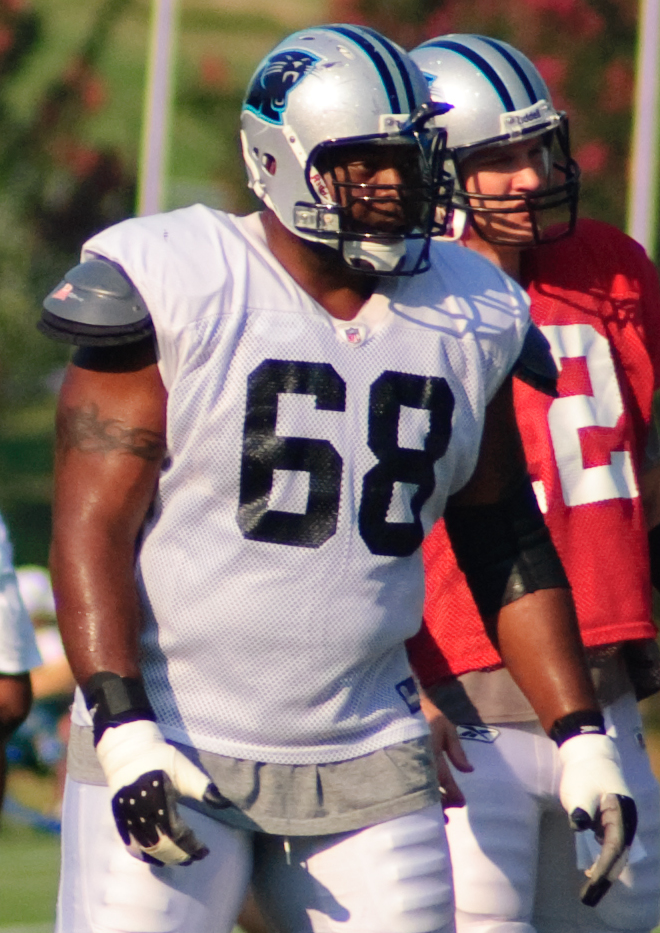
- Vincent with the Panthers in 2009

No. 68, 73
- Position: Guard

Personal information
- Born: April 13, 1978 (age 48); Bartow, Florida, U.S.
- Listed height: 6 ft 5 in (1.96 m)
- Listed weight: 325 lb (147 kg)

Career information
- High school: Lake Gibson (FL)
- College: Ole Miss
- NFL draft: 2001: undrafted

Career history
- Pittsburgh Steelers (2001–2004); Baltimore Ravens (2005–2006); Arizona Cardinals (2007); Carolina Panthers (2008–2009); Tampa Bay Buccaneers (2010)

Career NFL statistics
- Games played: 102
- Games started: 84
- Fumble recoveries: 1
- Stats at Pro Football Reference

Keydrick Trepell Vincent (born April 13, 1978) is an American former professional football player who was a guard in the National Football League (NFL). He played college football for the Ole Miss Rebels and was signed by the Pittsburgh Steelers as an undrafted free agent in 2001. He last played for the Tampa Bay Buccaneers.

Vincent has also played for the Carolina Panthers, Arizona Cardinals, Baltimore Ravens, and Pittsburgh Steelers in his career. Vincent was a starting guard for the Steelers in 2003 and 2004 and also for the Panthers in 2008 and 2009.

Vincent began the 2010 season as the starting left guard but was waived by the Buccaneers, who had signed him as a free agent in July 2010, in mid-season.

== College career ==
Vincent attended the University of Mississippi and started most of the games for four years.
