= Matt Cushing =

American football player (born 1975)

No. 48, 80
- Position: Tight end

Personal information
- Born: July 2, 1975 (age 51); South Bend, Indiana, U.S.
- Listed height: 6 ft 4 in (1.93 m)
- Listed weight: 251 lb (114 kg)

Career information
- High school: Mount Carmel (Chicago, Illinois)
- College: Illinois
- NFL draft: 1998: undrafted

Career history
- Pittsburgh Steelers (1998)*; Amsterdam Admirals (1999); Pittsburgh Steelers (1999–2004)
- * Offseason or practice squad member only

Career NFL statistics
- Receptions: 13
- Receiving yards: 91
- Touchdowns: 1
- Stats at Pro Football Reference

Matthew Jay Cushing (born July 2, 1975) is an American former professional football player who was a tight end for six seasons for the Pittsburgh Steelers of the National Football League (NFL). He played college football for the Illinois Fighting Illini.

Cushing was a 1998 undrafted free agent of the Steelers who was released during camp that year. After injuries to Mark Bruener and Mitch Lyons in 1999, he obtained a roster spot. Cushing went on to increase his value to the team by serving as an emergency fullback.

In college at the University of Illinois Urbana-Champaign, he was a three-year starter who received the Bruce Capel award as most courageous player and was an Academic All Big Ten selection.

In February 2010, Cushing was sworn in as a Downers Grove, IL park district commissioner. He has served as President of a Downers Grove, Illinois company, First Choice Dental Lab.
