= Joey Porter =

American football player and coach (born 1977)

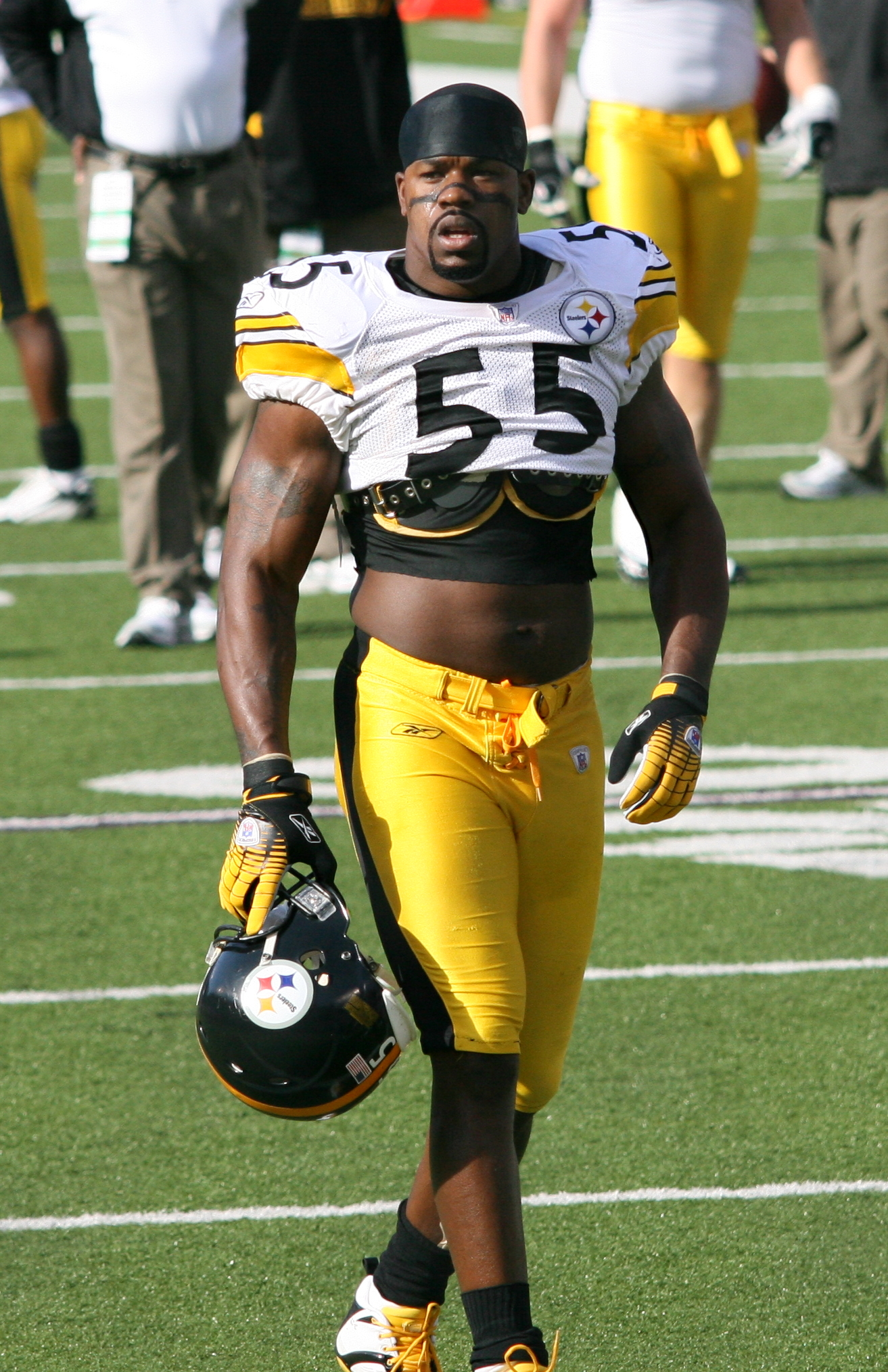
- Porter with the Pittsburgh Steelers in 2006

No. 55
- Position: Outside linebacker

Personal information
- Born: March 22, 1977 (age 49); Santa Clara County, California, U.S.
- Listed height: 6 ft 3 in (1.91 m)
- Listed weight: 248 lb (112 kg)

Career information
- High school: Foothill (Bakersfield, California)
- College: Colorado State (1995–1998)
- NFL draft: 1999: 3rd round, 73rd overall pick

Career history

Playing
- Pittsburgh Steelers (1999–2006); Miami Dolphins (2007–2009); Arizona Cardinals (2010–2011)

Coaching
- Colorado State (2013) Defensive assistant; Pittsburgh Steelers (2014) Defensive assistant; Pittsburgh Steelers (2015–2018) Outside linebackers coach; San Antonio Brahmas (2023) Linebackers coach

Awards and highlights
- Super Bowl champion (XL); 2× First-team All-Pro (2002, 2008); 2× Second-team All-Pro (2004, 2005); 4× Pro Bowl (2002, 2004, 2005, 2008); NFL 2000s All-Decade Team; Pittsburgh Steelers All-Time Team; Pittsburgh Steelers Hall of Honor; First-team All-WAC (1998)

Career NFL statistics
- Total tackles: 689
- Sacks: 98.0
- Forced fumbles: 25
- Fumble recoveries: 10
- Interceptions: 12
- Defensive touchdowns: 3
- Stats at Pro Football Reference

Joseph Eugene Porter Sr. (born March 22, 1977) is an American professional football coach and former player. He played as an outside linebacker in the National Football League (NFL). He played college football for the Colorado State Rams and was selected by the Pittsburgh Steelers in the third round of the 1999 NFL draft. A four-time Pro Bowl selection, Porter won Super Bowl XL with the Steelers and was also a member of the Miami Dolphins and Arizona Cardinals. The Steelers drafted his son, Joey Porter Jr., with the thirty-second overall selection of the 2023 NFL draft.

== Early life ==
Porter's prep career took place at Foothill High School in Bakersfield, California. He was a two-time All-Conference selection as wide receiver and running back for the Trojans. His senior season, he led the team to a 9–2 mark and a berth in the sectional playoffs, rushing the ball 86 times for 1,086 yards. After his final season at Foothill, he was named to the All-Section and All-State teams. He lettered twice in football, plus twice in basketball. He also played soccer as a youth.

Porter has never moved from his hometown and ran a youth football camp at Foothill throughout his career.

== College career ==
While attending Colorado State University, Porter was a standout on the football field for the Colorado State Rams football team. He began his college career as an H-back and did not see his first action on the defensive line until his junior year. He was a third-team All-American and All-Western Athletic Conference first-team selection by The Sports Network. He registered 22 career sacks. As a senior, he recorded 53 tackles (36 solos) with eight quarterback pressures and 12 tackles-for-losses. He finished third in National Collegiate Athletic Association (NCAA) Division I-A with a school single-season record-tying 15 sacks for minus 63 yards. He majored in exercise and sport science. He is a member of Phi Beta Sigma fraternity.

== Professional career ==
Pre-draft measurables
Height	Weight	Arm length	Hand span	40-yard dash	10-yard split	20-yard split	20-yard shuttle	Three-cone drill	Vertical jump	Broad jump	Bench press
6 ft 2 1/2 in (1.89 m)	241 lb (109 kg)	32 3/4 in (0.83 m)	9 3/4 in (0.25 m)	4.68 s	1.65 s	2.74 s	4.41 s	7.37 s	39.0 in (0.99 m)	10 ft 2 in (3.10 m)	27 reps
All values from NFL Combine

=== Pittsburgh Steelers ===
The Pittsburgh Steelers selected Porter in the third round (73rd overall) of the 1999 NFL draft. Porter was the eighth linebacker drafted in 1999.

During the preseason, Porter wore number 95, the first Steelers player to wear the number since Steelers linebacker great Greg Lloyd was released following the 1997 season. However, despite his similarities to Lloyd in terms of playing style and vocal leadership (or perhaps because of it), Porter changed his jersey number to 55 just before the start of the regular season in order to develop his own identity. He also took 55 in honor of his childhood hero, Junior Seau.

He finished the preseason as the team's leading tackler, recording 22 total tackles (18 solo). He also recorded a team-high four sacks and forced a fumble. He went on to excel on special teams during the 1999 season, with his time on defense increasing as the year went on. His first career sack came on Cleveland Browns quarterback Tim Couch on September 12, when he also forced a fumble on the play. He partially deflected a punt against the Jacksonville Jaguars on December 2. In the season finale against the Tennessee Titans, Porter accumulated six tackles and a sack. He also forced and recovered a Neil O'Donnell fumble and returned it 46 yards for a score.

In 2000, Porter finished second behind Jason Gildon and set a career-high with 10.5 sacks on the year. He and Gildon also tied a franchise record with 24 sacks as a duo. On the year, he registered 74 tackle (51 solo), one interception, three passes defensed, two forced fumbles and a fumble recovery. He was voted the AFC Defensive Player of the Month in October. Against the Cincinnati Bengals on October 15, he registered eight tackles (seven solo), three sacks including one for a safety, four quarterback hurries and a forced fumble. He had five tackles and two sacks in a game against the Baltimore Ravens two games later. Porter's first career interception came against the Tennessee Titans on November 5 on a pass from Steve McNair. His second career touchdown came on a 32-yard fumble recovery against the Philadelphia Eagles on November 12. He closed out the season with 1.5 sacks against the San Diego Chargers on December 24.

During the September 17 game against the rival Cleveland Browns in Cleveland, Porter tackled punter Chris Gardocki while Gardocki was trying to punt the ball. While Porter would be penalized for roughing the punter, Gardocki briefly laid motionless, then subsequently flipped the middle finger twice to Steelers head coach Bill Cowher. The incident, caught on live television, resulted in a $5,000 fine for Gardocki. The two would later be teammates with the Steelers from 2004–2006.

Porter had a career day against the Tampa Bay Buccaneers on October 21, 2001, recording six tackles, four sacks and a pass deflected while earning American Football Conference (AFC) Defensive Player of the Week honors. Two weeks later he registered four tackles and two sacks against the Baltimore Ravens. He missed the season finale against the Browns – the first time he failed to play in his NFL career – due to a shoulder injury. He finished with 59 tackles and nine sacks on the season.

In Week 2 of the 2002 season, Porter had what is likely the best game of his professional career. In a 30–17 loss to the Oakland Raiders on September 15, Porter recorded seven tackles, three sacks, two interceptions and two pass deflections. The performance, during which he returned one interceptions 84 yards, earned him AFC Defensive Player of the Week honors. He recorded five tackles, two sacks and a forced fumble in a 34–7 win over the Cincinnati Bengals on October 13. On the year, Porter recorded nine sacks – the third straight year of eclipsing the mark – while setting career highs in tackles (88), interceptions (4) and interception return yards (153). He was selected to his first Pro Bowl following the season.

In 2003, Porter recorded the lowest sack total of his career since his rookie year, while missing two games due to a gunshot wound to the buttocks suffered on August 31, 2003, outside of a Denver bar as an innocent bystander, just before the beginning of the season. He recorded a sack and recovered a fumble in his first game back against the Bengals on September 21. On October 26 against the St. Louis Rams, he had six tackles, a pass defense and two sacks—his only multiple-sack game of the year. In 14 games played, he recorded 65 tackles, five sacks, a forced fumble, a fumble recovery and four pass deflections.

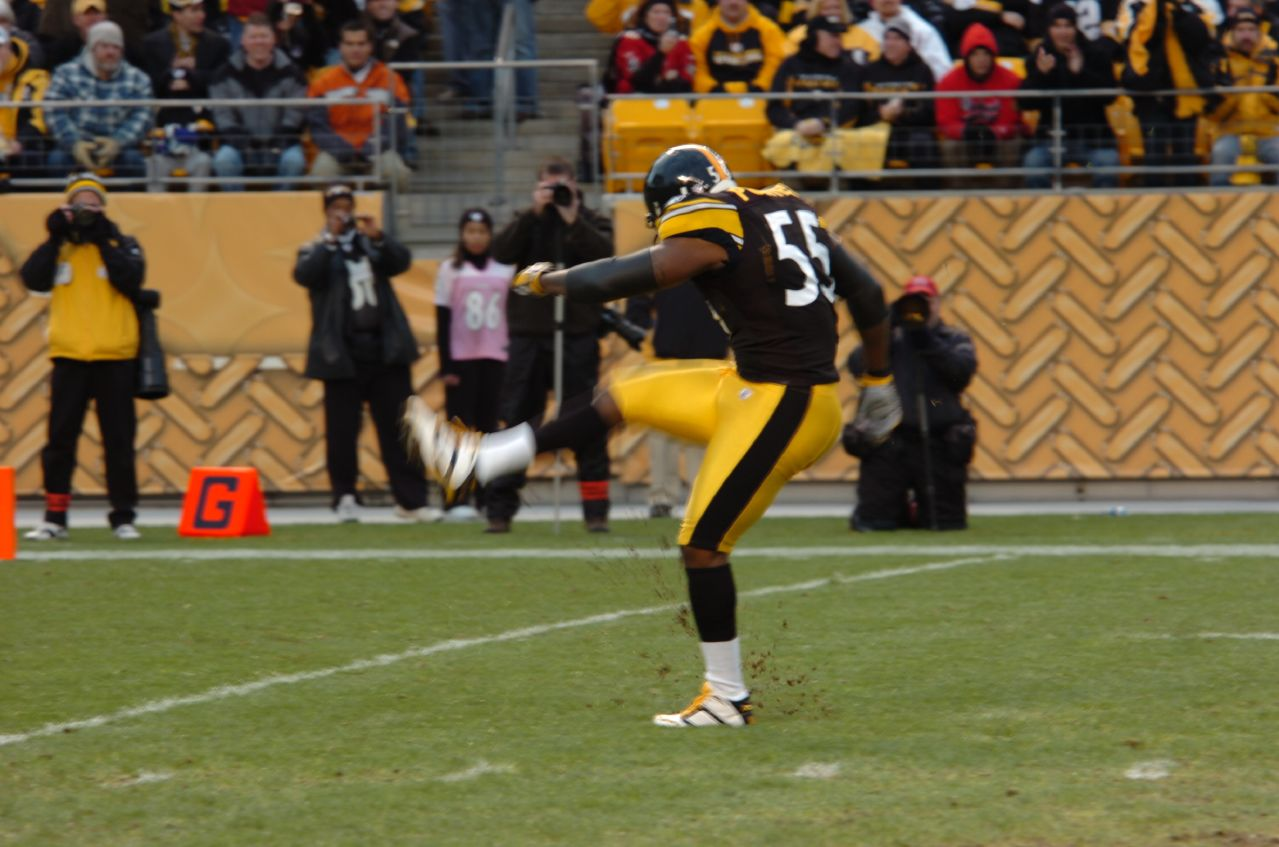
Porter during a Steelers game in 2006

Porter bounced back in 2004 with the second Pro Bowl selection of his career. In an October 31 win against the New England Patriots, he recorded four tackles, three sacks and two forced fumbles. He was selected the AFC Defensive Player of the Week for his performance. He recorded two sacks against the Washington Redskins on November 28, and had his lone interception of the season on December 26 on a pass from Baltimore Ravens quarterback Kyle Boller. Porter finished the year with 53 tackles, seven sacks and an interception.

On November 14 against the Browns, Porter and Browns running back William Green were both ejected prior to kickoff due to a pregame fight. Porter's backup, James Harrison (who would ultimately replace Porter in the starting lineup after Porter left Pittsburgh), would get his first NFL start in place of Porter.

Porter had one of his best years in 2005 as his team went on to beat the Seattle Seahawks in Super Bowl XL. He was named to the third Pro Bowl of his career and the second in two years. On the year, he tied a career-high with 10.5 sacks while adding 56 tackles, two interceptions and four forced fumbles. He recorded a sack in four of the team's first five games of the season. In a 41–0 win over the Cleveland Browns on December 24, he had five tackles, three sacks and a forced fumble.

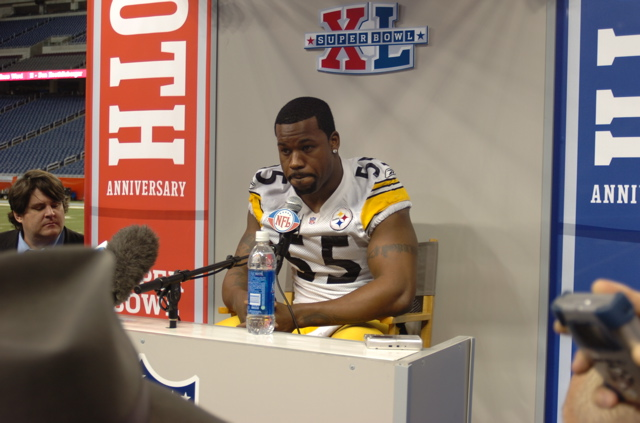
Porter at Super Bowl XL's media day

In what would be his final year as a member of the Steelers, Porter recorded seven sacks on the year, six of them in three games against the Miami Dolphins, Oakland Raiders and Tampa Bay Buccaneers and another half sack against the Cleveland Browns. In the season opener against the Miami Dolphins, he intercepted a Daunte Culpepper pass in the fourth quarter and returned it for his first interception touchdown to seal a victory. He missed two games in October while nursing a hamstring injury. He finished the year with 55 tackles and seven sacks.

=== Miami Dolphins ===
With the Steelers in transition under new head coach Mike Tomlin (who would later become close friends with Porter), the team released Porter on March 1, 2007, in lieu of paying him a $1 million roster bonus. He received immediate interest from a handful of teams, including Pittsburgh's three division rivals—the Cincinnati Bengals, Cleveland Browns and Baltimore Ravens. The Dallas Cowboys, New York Giants and San Diego Chargers were also in the mix, but it came down to the Cincinnati Bengals and Miami Dolphins. After Dolphins head coach Cam Cameron and general manager Randy Mueller flew to Porter's home in owner Wayne Huizenga's jet, Porter was persuaded to sign with the Dolphins.

Porter was officially signed by the Dolphins on March 8, 2007. He received a five-year deal worth approximately $32 million. The deal included a $12 million signing bonus and $8 million in guaranteed money. He was immediately named the starting strongside linebacker, playing opposite Jason Taylor—the 2006 NFL Defensive Player of the Year Award winner. Porter struggled during the 2007 season, recording only 5.5 sacks, his lowest total since 2003.

The 2008 season saw a rejuvenated Porter return to his old form, leading the AFC and finishing second in the NFL with a career-high 17.5 sacks; thus, he played an integral role in helping the Dolphins improve from the 1–15 Dolphins of 2007 into an 11–5 AFC East champion football team. For the season, he was named to his fourth Pro Bowl and was named Second-team All-Pro.

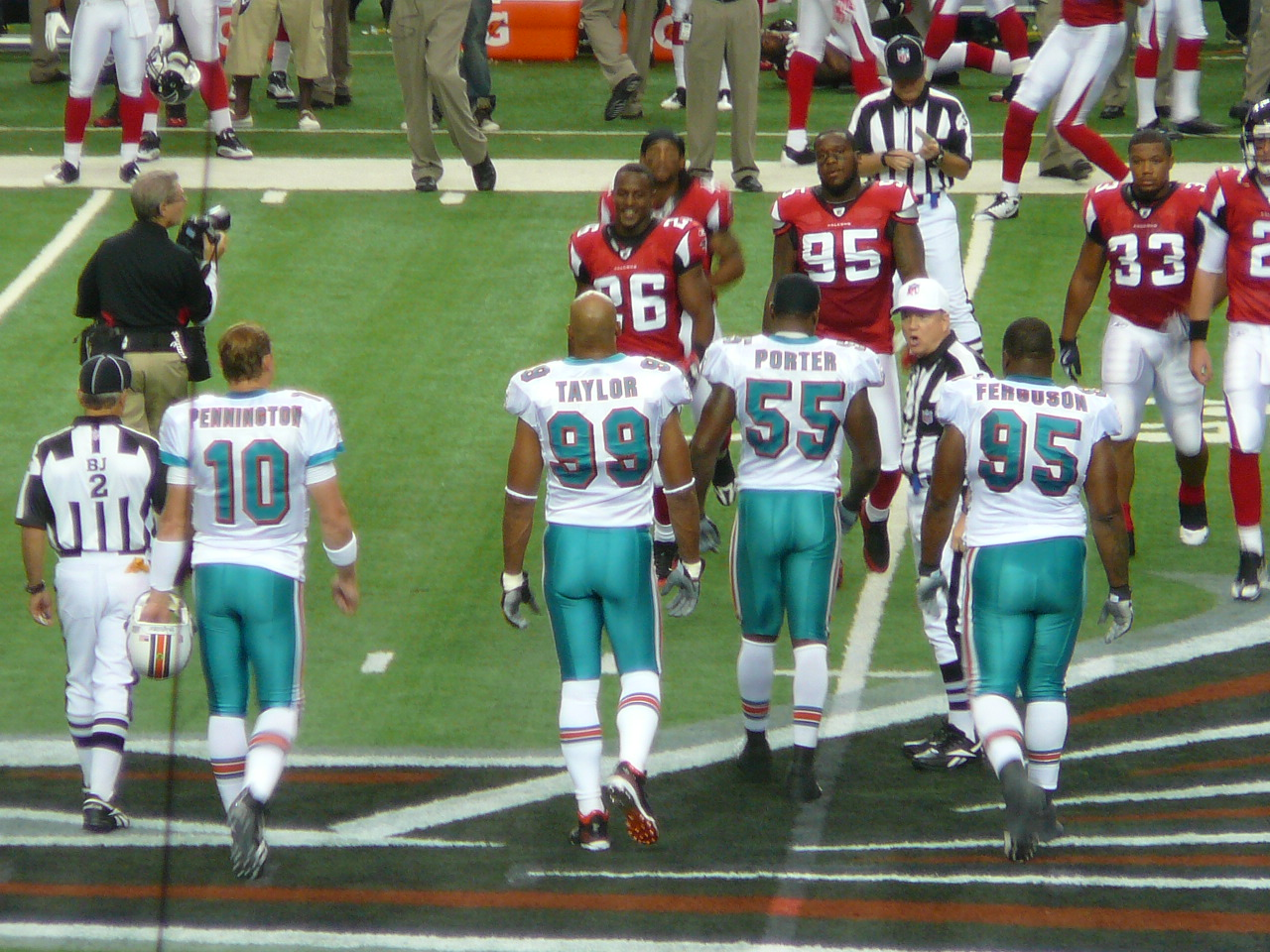
Porter (#55) with fellow 2009 Dolphins team captains Chad Pennington, Jason Taylor and Jason Ferguson.

Porter started for the Dolphins at outside linebacker in 2009 and was named a team captain. In a poll of 296 NFL players, he tied Washington's Albert Haynesworth as the second dirtiest defensive player in the league. During Week 9, Porter took heat from the press after calling out the New England Patriots quarterback Tom Brady and leaving the game after recording zero tackles and avoiding the press.

The next week, Porter was suspended for one game by Dolphins coach Tony Sparano for undisclosed reasons. He was released on March 5, 2010.

=== Arizona Cardinals ===
On March 19, 2010, Porter signed a three-year, $24.5 million contract with the Arizona Cardinals, with $17.5 million in guaranteed money. In his first season with the Cardinals, he recorded 50 tackles and five sacks. In 2011, he only played in six games due to injury, recording 16 tackles and one sack.

=== Retirement ===
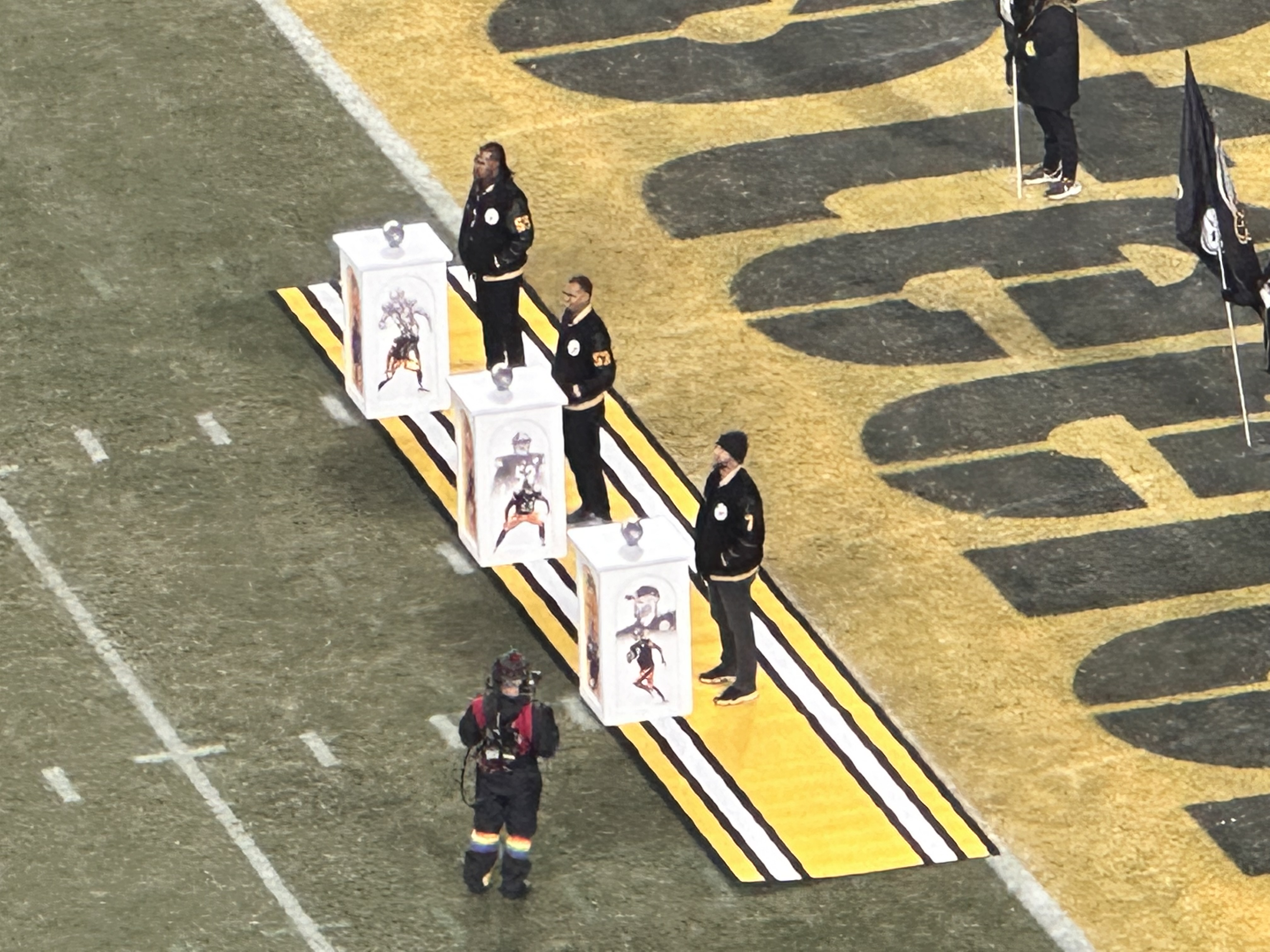
Porter (far left) being inducted into the Steelers’ Hall of Honor during halftime against the Miami Dolphins on Monday Night Football in 2025

On July 19, 2012, Porter announced he would retire from the NFL. He had talked to Steelers owner Art Rooney II and general manager Kevin Colbert about signing a one-day contract so that he could retire as a Pittsburgh Steeler. On August 3, 2012, Porter was officially retired as a Pittsburgh Steeler during the evening festivities of the Steelers training camp at Saint Vincent College in Latrobe, Pennsylvania.

== NFL career statistics ==
Legend
	Won the Super Bowl
**Bold**	Career high

Year	Team	GP	Tackles				Fum & Int		
Year	Team	GP	Cmb	Solo	Ast	Sck	FF	FR	Int
1999	PIT	16	26	23	3	2.0	1	**2**	0
2000	PIT	16	60	42	18	10.5	2	1	1
2001	PIT	15	61	47	14	9.0	**4**	1	0
2002	PIT	16	**89**	**61**	**28**	9.0	2	**2**	**4**
2003	PIT	14	66	50	16	5.0	1	1	0
2004	PIT	15	54	37	17	7.0	3	0	1
2005	PIT	16	57	39	18	10.5	**4**	1	2
2006	PIT	14	55	40	15	7.0	0	0	2
2007	MIA	16	66	57	9	5.5	1	0	2
2008	MIA	16	48	37	11	**17.5**	**4**	1	0
2009	MIA	14	41	34	7	9.0	1	1	0
2010	ARI	14	50	38	12	5.0	2	0	0
2011	ARI	6	16	11	5	1.0	0	0	0
Career		188	689	516	173	98.0	25	10	12

== Coaching career ==
On July 31, 2013 Colorado State coach Jim McElwain announced that Porter would join the Colorado State coaching staff; he would also finish his degree. Porter served as a defensive assistant under former Steelers defensive coordinator, Dick LeBeau, for the 2014 season. In February 2015, Porter was promoted to outside linebackers coach under new defensive coordinator, Keith Butler. After having technically never played under Mike Tomlin due to being released a month and a half after Tomlin took over as head coach in a salary cap move, Porter was now an assistant coach under Tomlin, leading to a friendship between the two including their sons going to high school together and themselves becoming friends with each other.

Near the end of the Wild Card Playoff game against the Cincinnati Bengals on January 9, 2016, Porter was on the field during an injury timeout, although assistant coaches are not permitted on the field during an injury. He appeared to be arguing with a number of Bengals players, receiving a push from Bengals cornerback Adam Jones, drawing a 15-yard penalty against Cincinnati. The penalty set up the Steelers for a 35-yard field goal with seconds left that was the eventual game-winning kick. Porter was issued a reported $10,000 fine by the NFL for his actions on the field. In 2016, the incident has been made into a new NFL rule, called the "Joey Porter Rule", which expressly prohibits assistant coaches from entering the field of play. On January 9, 2017, Porter was placed on administrative leave after being arrested the day prior. He was reinstated to the coaching staff on January 13, 2017, after a subsequent investigation by the District Attorney dropped more serious charges and left him with only summary offenses. Porter resumed his coaching duties in the Steelers' 18–16 victory over the Kansas City Chiefs in the divisional playoff game on January 15, 2017. Porter was fired by the Steelers in January 2019 after his fourth season as the team's outside linebackers coach.

Porter was officially hired by the San Antonio Brahmas of the XFL on September 13, 2022, whose head coach was his former teammate Hines Ward. Porter was not retained after the 2023 XFL season after the departure of Ward.

== Personal life ==
Porter and his wife Christy have two boys; Joey Jr. and Jacob, and two girls; Jasmine and Jayla. Joey Jr. is a cornerback for the Cowboys, selected 32nd in the 2023 NFL draft.

On March 28, 2010, Porter was arrested on suspicion of drunken driving and assault on a California Highway Patrol officer. It was later announced that all charges were dropped.

On December 24, 2012, Porter was freed from jail after three days for writing a bad check. He paid $70,000 to cover the check to the Hard Rock Casino for "casino markers" given to him in June and July 2012. Also in 2012, again in Las Vegas, Porter was accused of punching Levi Jones outside a casino, resulting in a $141,176 fine from the NFL.

In March 2013, news outlets reported that Porter's South Florida mansion was facing foreclosure.

On January 8, 2017, Porter was arrested at The Flats On Southside, a bar in Pittsburgh's South Side neighborhood and initially charged with aggravated assault, simple assault, resisting arrest, public drunkenness, and disorderly conduct. He was placed on leave the next day, but was reinstated a few days later when four of the six charges were dropped.
