= Jason Gildon =

American football player (born 1972)

No. 92, 56
- Position: Linebacker

Personal information
- Born: July 31, 1972 (age 54); Altus, Oklahoma, U.S.
- Listed height: 6 ft 4 in (1.93 m)
- Listed weight: 250 lb (113 kg)

Career information
- High school: Altus
- College: Oklahoma State
- NFL draft: 1994: 3rd round, 88th overall pick

Career history
- Pittsburgh Steelers (1994–2003); Buffalo Bills (2004)*; Jacksonville Jaguars (2004)
- * Offseason or practice squad member only

Awards and highlights
- First-team All-Pro (2001); 3× Pro Bowl (2000–2002); Pittsburgh Steelers Hall of Honor; 2× First-team All-Big Eight (1991, 1993); 2× Second-team All-Big Eight (1990, 1992)

Career NFL statistics
- Tackles: 519
- Sacks: 80
- Forced fumbles: 15
- Fumble recoveries: 11
- Interceptions: 2
- Touchdowns: 3
- Stats at Pro Football Reference

Jason Larue Gildon (born July 31, 1972) is an American former professional football player who was a linebacker in the National Football League (NFL) for the Pittsburgh Steelers from 1994 to 2003 and the Jacksonville Jaguars in 2004. He was selected to three Pro Bowl teams from 2000, 2001, and 2002, and is currently ranked sixth in Steelers all-time career sacks with 77. He played college football for the Oklahoma State Cowboys.

== College career ==
Gildon is an Oklahoma State University alum.

== Professional career ==
Pre-draft measurables
Height	Weight	Arm length	Hand span	40-yard dash	10-yard split	20-yard split	20-yard shuttle	Vertical jump	Broad jump	Bench press
6 ft 3 1/4 in (1.91 m)	235 lb (107 kg)	33 1/2 in (0.85 m)	9 1/2 in (0.24 m)	4.90 s	1.77 s	2.87 s	4.40 s	36 in (0.91 m)	9 ft 8 in (2.95 m)	18 reps
All values from NFL Combine

Gildon was selected in the third round of the 1994 NFL draft by the Steelers. Gildon played a large role on the Steelers special teams unit during his first two years before being inserted into the starting lineup in 1996, after All-Pro pass-rusher Greg Lloyd, Sr. went down in the season opener with a torn knee ligament. Gildon turned in 7.0 sacks in 1996.

1997 saw Gildon lineup opposite Lloyd after returning and recorded 5.0 sacks, 53 tackles, 12 passes defensed, and 1 defensive touchdown. Gildon was most remembered in 1997 for recovering a Drew Bledsoe fumble late into the Steelers 1997 Divisional Playoff match-up against the New England Patriots; the Steelers would win this game 7-6 thanks to Gildon securing the ball, preventing a possible Patriots field goal or touchdown.

Over the course of the 1998 and 1999 seasons, Gildon would rack up a total of 19.5 sacks and 109 tackles.

The 2000 Steelers season was Gildon's break-out year. He would amass 13.5 sacks, 75 tackles, and 1 defensive touchdown, and was the anchor of a Steelers defense that helped the team record its first winning season in three years. Now teamed up with young outside linebacker Joey Porter, many speculated that the Steelers had their best pair of pass-rushing linebackers since Lloyd and Kevin Greene from the mid-90s. Gildon capped off an impressive season with his first Pro Bowl berth.

In 2001, the Steelers finally made their way back to the playoffs and Gildon kept up his charge. He would record 12.0 sacks, score his third career defensive touchdown, and pull down his first career interception against the Cincinnati Bengals. He was named to his second Pro-Bowl, but his dreams and that of the Steelers' of getting to the Super Bowl were erased after a defeat to the Patriots in the 2001 AFC Championship Game.

Gildon made his third and final Pro Bowl team in 2002 while his numbers decreased a bit. He had 9.0 sacks, his lowest total since 1999. Gildon had reached age 30 while Porter finished 2002 as the Steelers co-MVP and new defensive leader.

2003 was Gildon's last season with the Steelers, who had finished the year 6–10. He started the season with 71.0, needing just 3.0 sacks to pass L. C. Greenwood. During a game against the Arizona Cardinals, Gildon brought the home crowd to its feet one last time when he sacked Cardinals quarterback Jeff Blake in the third quarter to surpass Greenwood.

Gildon was a member of the Buffalo Bills during the 2004 training camp, but he was cut two weeks into camp. Midway through the 2004 season, the Jacksonville Jaguars signed Gildon to their roster, who needed help at defensive end. Gildon contributed 3.0 sacks, including one against his former team on December 5, 2004.

For his career, Gildon finished with 80.0 sacks, 520 tackles, 44 passes defensed, 2 interceptions, and 3 defensive touchdowns.

== Post-NFL career ==
After his professional football career ended, Gildon went into coaching. He was an assistant coach at Seneca Valley and Peters Township, near Pittsburgh. In Feb. 2015, he beat out 40 applicants from 10 states and became the head football coach at Cardinal Wuerl North Catholic HS in a Pittsburgh suburb. He left that position in December 2016 after two seasons and a record of 17–6 overall.

== Personal life ==
Gildon is the older brother of former Tennessee Titans defensive end Larry Birdine.

== NFL career statistics ==
Year	Team	GP	COMB	TOTAL	AST	SACK	FF	FR	FR YDS	INT	IR YDS	AVG IR	LNG	TD	PD
1994	PIT	16	5	4	1	2.0	0	0	0	0	0	0	0	0	0
1995	PIT	16	13	8	5	3.0	2	1	0	0	0	0	0	0	0
1996	PIT	14	58	46	12	7.0	2	0	0	0	0	0	0	0	2
1997	PIT	16	53	41	12	5.0	0	1	0	0	0	0	0	0	11
1998	PIT	16	53	41	12	11.0	2	1	0	0	0	0	0	0	6
1999	PIT	16	56	42	14	8.5	1	0	0	0	0	0	0	0	3
2000	PIT	16	75	56	19	13.5	4	4	0	0	0	0	0	0	4
2001	PIT	16	53	42	11	12.0	3	2	0	1	0	0	0	0	9
2002	PIT	16	67	45	22	9.0	3	0	0	0	0	0	0	0	4
2003	PIT	16	61	42	19	6.0	1	1	0	1	1	1	1	0	7
2004	JAX	9	12	11	1	3.0	0	0	0	0	0	0	0	0	0
Career		167	506	378	128	80.0	18	10	0	2	1	1	1	0	46
