= 2005 Pittsburgh Steelers season =

Pittsburgh Steelers 73rd US football season

- Owner: The Rooney Family
- General manager: Kevin Colbert
- Head coach: Bill Cowher
- Home stadium: Heinz Field

Results
- Record: 11–5
- Division place: 2nd AFC North
- Playoffs: Won Wild Card Playoffs (at Bengals) 31–17; Won Divisional Playoffs (at Colts) 21–18; Won AFC Championship (at Broncos) 34–17; Won Super Bowl XL (vs. Seahawks) 21–10
- All-Pros: 3: Alan Faneca (1st team); Troy Polamalu (1st team); Joey Porter (2nd team)
- Pro Bowlers: 5: G Alan Faneca; NT Casey Hampton; C Jeff Hartings; OLB Joey Porter; SS Troy Polamalu
- Team MVP: Casey Hampton; Hines Ward
- Team ROY: Heath Miller

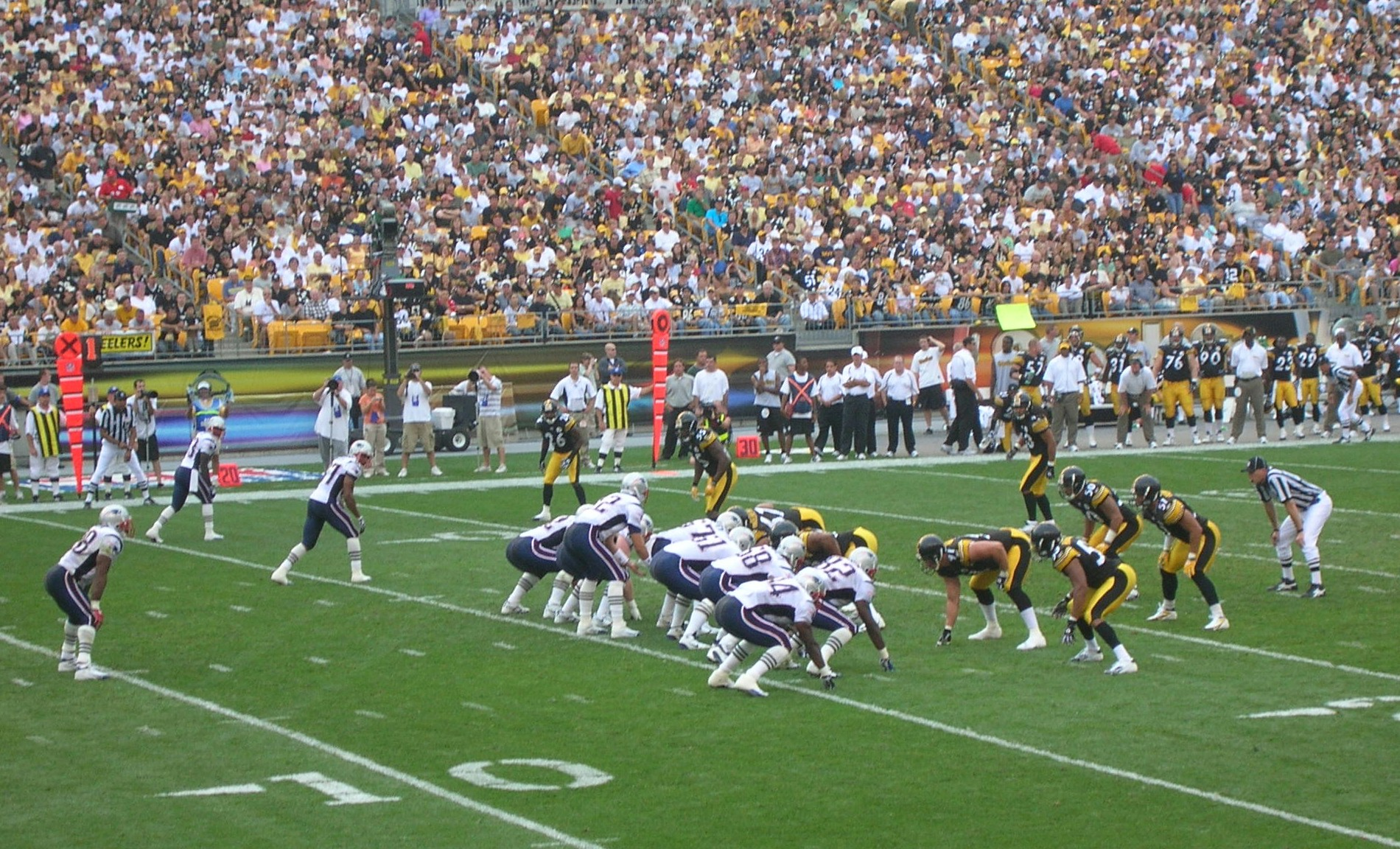
The defending champion New England Patriots playing at the eventual Super Bowl champion Steelers, September 25, 2005

The 2005 Pittsburgh Steelers season was the franchise's 73rd season as a professional sports franchise and as a member of the National Football League (NFL). It was the 6th season under the leadership of general manager Kevin Colbert and the 14th under head coach Bill Cowher. The Steelers failed to improve upon their 15–1 record from 2004 and in 2005, the Steelers struggled. At one point, they were 7–5 and in danger of missing the playoffs but rose to defeat the Chicago Bears on December 11 and started a four-game win streak to finish the season at 11–5.

The Steelers qualified for the playoffs as a wild-card team as the #6 seed and became just the second team ever (and the first in 20 years) to win three playoff games on the road after they beat the #3 seed Cincinnati Bengals (11–5), the top-seeded Indianapolis Colts (14–2), and the #2 seed Denver Broncos (13–3) to become the American Football Conference representative in Super Bowl XL. They defeated the NFC champion Seattle Seahawks in Super Bowl XL to secure their league-tying fifth Super Bowl title. In doing so, they also became the only team at the time since the 1970 AFL–NFL merger to win a Super Bowl without playing a single home playoff game; though the New York Giants would repeat the feat two years later.

== Offseason ==
Additions	Subtractions
WR Cedrick Wilson (49ers)	WR Plaxico Burress (Giants)
WR Quincy Morgan (Cowboys)	NT Kendrick Clancy (Giants)
	CB Chad Scott (Patriots)
	LB Kendrell Bell (Chiefs)
	LS Mike Schneck (Bills)
	G Keydrick Vincent (Ravens)

=== 2005 NFL draft ===
2005 Pittsburgh Steelers draft
Round	Pick	Player	Position	College	Notes
1	30	Heath Miller *	Tight end	Virginia	
2	62	Bryant McFadden	Cornerback	Florida State	
3	93	Trai Essex	Offensive tackle	Northwestern	
4	131	Fred Gibson	Wide receiver	Georgia	
5	166	Rian Wallace	Linebacker	Temple	
6	204	Chris Kemoeatu	Offensive guard	Utah	
7	207	Shaun Nua	Defensive tackle	BYU	
7	244	Noah Herron	Running back	Northwestern	
Made roster † Pro Football Hall of Fame * Made at least one Pro Bowl during career

=== Undrafted free agents ===
2005 undrafted free agents of note
Player	Position	College
Morgan Davis	Tackle	Wisconsin
Andre Frazier	Linebacker	Cincinnati
Elliott Harris	Defensive tackle	Arkansas
Arnold Harrison	Linebacker	Georgia
John Kuhn	Fullback	Shippensburg
Ronald Stanley	Linebacker	Michigan State
Shaun Suisham	Kicker	Bowling Green
Zach Tuiasosopo	Fullback	Washington
Jake Verstraete	Guard	Northern Illinois
Greg Warren	Long snapper	North Carolina
Nate Washington	Wide receiver	Tiffin

== Personnel ==
=== Staff ===
2005 Pittsburgh Steelers staff
Front office: Chairman – Daniel M. Rooney; President – Arthur J. Rooney II; Vice president – John R. McGinley; Vice president – Arthur J. Rooney, Jr.; Administration advisor – Chuck Noll; Director of business – Mark Hart; Controller – Jim Ellenberger; Human relations/office coordinator – Geraldine Glenn; Business operations coordinator – Omar Khan; Accounting manager – Jodie Spagnolli; Communications coordinator – Dave Lockett; Public relations/media manager – Burt Lauten; Community relations manager – Michele Rosenthal; Information technology administrator – Scott Phelps; Marketing and merchandising; Director of marketing – Tony Quatrini; Marketing coordinator – Rick Giugliano; Marketing manager – John Wodarek; Producer/broadcasting manager – Rick Fairbend; Broadcasting assistant – Pete Gergely; Marketing/community relations manager – Lynne Molyneaux; Marketing assistant – John Simpson; Marketing assistant – Mike Marchinsky; Ticket operations; Ticket manager – Ben Lentz; Season ticket assistant – Libby Patcher; Football operations; Director of football operations – Kevin Colbert; College scouting coordinator – Ron Hughes; Pro scouting coordinator – Doug Whaley; Special assistant/pro and college personnel – Joe Greene; Pro/college scout – Phil Kreidler; College scout – Mark Gorscak; College scout – Kelvin Fisher; College scout – Bruce McNorton; College scout – Dan Rooney; College personnel – Bill Nunn; BLESTO Scout – David Petett; Head coaches: Head coach – Bill Cowher; Assistant head coach/offensive line – Russ Grimm; Offensive coaches: Offensive coordinator – Ken Whisenhunt; Quarterbacks – Mark Whipple; Running backs – Dick Hoak; Wide receivers – Bruce Arians; Tight ends – James Daniel; Offensive assistant – Matt Raich	Defensive coaches: Defensive coordinator – Dick LeBeau; Defensive line – John Mitchell; Linebackers – Keith Butler; Defensive backs – Darren Perry; Assistant defensive backs – Ray Horton; Defensive assistant – Lou Spanos; Special teams coaches: Special teams – Kevin Spencer; Strength and conditioning: Conditioning coach – Chet Fuhrman; Conditioning assistant – Marcel Pastoor; Medical staff; Physician, orthopedic – Dr. James P. Bradley; Ophthalmologist – Dr. Francis Mah; Neurological surgery consultant – Dr. Joseph Maroon; Physician, M.D. – Dr. Richard Rydze; Physician, consultant – Dr. Abraham J. Twerski; Physician, M.D. – Dr. Anthony P. Yates; Training staff; Head athletic trainer – John Norwig; Assistant athletic trainer – Ryan Grove; Assistant athletic trainer – Ariko Iso; Football staff; Player development – Raymond Jackson; Equipment manager - Rodgers Freyvogel; Field manager – Rich Baker; Field/equipment assistant – Kalvin Jones; Video coordinator – Bob McCartney; Video assistant – Andy Lizanich; Video assistant – Rob Brakel; Photographer – Mike Fabus

Notable additions include Heath Miller and Nate Washington.

== Roster ==
2005 Pittsburgh Steelers roster
Quarterbacks (QB): 16 Charlie Batch; 8 Tommy Maddox; 7 Ben Roethlisberger; Running backs (RB): 36 Jerome Bettis; 34 Verron Haynes; 35 Dan Kreider FB; 39 Willie Parker; 22 Duce Staley; Wide receivers (WR): 81 Sean Morey; 11 Quincy Morgan; 82 Antwaan Randle El; 86 Hines Ward; 85 Nate Washington; 80 Cedrick Wilson; Tight ends (TE): 83 Heath Miller; 84 Jerame Tuman	Offensive linemen (OL): 72 Barrett Brooks LT; 79 Trai Essex RT; 66 Alan Faneca G; 64 Jeff Hartings C; 68 Chris Kemoeatu G; 56 Chukky Okobi C; 73 Kendall Simmons G; 77 Marvel Smith LT; 78 Max Starks RT; Defensive linemen (DL): 98 Casey Hampton NT; 76 Chris Hoke NT; 99 Brett Keisel DE; 90 Travis Kirschke DE; 96 Shaun Nua DE; 91 Aaron Smith DE; 67 Kimo von Oelhoffen DE	Linebackers (LB): 51 James Farrior ILB; 50 Larry Foote ILB; 94 Andre Frazier OLB; 92 James Harrison OLB; 53 Clark Haggans OLB; 57 Clint Kriewaldt ILB; 55 Joey Porter OLB; 54 Rian Wallace ILB; Defensive backs (DB): 23 Tyrone Carter SS; 21 Ricardo Colclough CB; 28 Chris Hope FS; 29 Chidi Iwuoma CB; 31 Mike Logan S; 20 Bryant McFadden CB; 43 Troy Polamalu SS; 24 Ike Taylor CB; 26 Deshea Townsend CB; 27 Willie Williams CB; Special teams (ST): 17 Chris Gardocki P; 3 Jeff Reed K; 60 Greg Warren LS	Practice squad: 69 Ulish Booker OT; 65 Tim Brown C; 97 Arnold Harrison OLB; 42 John Kuhn FB; 49 Erik Jensen TE; 5 Rod Rutherford QB; 95 Richard Seigler ILB; 18 Walter Young WR; Reserve: 33 Russell Stuvaints S (IR); Rookies in italics 53 active, 1 reserve, 8 practice squad

== Preseason ==
=== Schedule ===
Week	Date	Opponent	Result	Record	Venue	Recap
1	August 15	Philadelphia Eagles	W 38–31	1–0	Heinz Field	Recap
2	August 20	Miami Dolphins	W 17–3	2–0	Heinz Field	Recap
3	August 26	at Washington Redskins	L 10–17	2–1	FedExField	Recap
4	September 1	at Carolina Panthers	W 21–17	3–1	Bank of America Stadium	Recap

== Regular season ==
=== Schedule ===
Week	Date	Opponent	Result	Record	Venue	Recap
1	September 11	Tennessee Titans	W 34–7	1–0	Heinz Field	Recap
2	September 18	at Houston Texans	W 27–7	2–0	Reliant Stadium	Recap
3	September 25	New England Patriots	L 20–23	2–1	Heinz Field	Recap
4	Bye					
5	October 10	at San Diego Chargers	W 24–22	3–1	Qualcomm Stadium	Recap
6	October 16	Jacksonville Jaguars	L 17–23 (OT)	3–2	Heinz Field	Recap
7	October 23	at Cincinnati Bengals	W 27–13	4–2	Paul Brown Stadium	Recap
8	October 31	Baltimore Ravens	W 20–19	5–2	Heinz Field	Recap
9	November 6	at Green Bay Packers	W 20–10	6–2	Lambeau Field	Recap
10	November 13	Cleveland Browns	W 34–21	7–2	Heinz Field	Recap
11	November 20	at Baltimore Ravens	L 13–16 (OT)	7–3	M&T Bank Stadium	Recap
12	November 28	at Indianapolis Colts	L 7–26	7–4	RCA Dome	Recap
13	December 4	Cincinnati Bengals	L 31–38	7–5	Heinz Field	Recap
14	December 11	Chicago Bears	W 21–9	8–5	Heinz Field	Recap
15	December 18	at Minnesota Vikings	W 18–3	9–5	Hubert H. Humphrey Metrodome	Recap
16	December 24	at Cleveland Browns	W 41–0	10–5	Cleveland Browns Stadium	Recap
17	January 1	Detroit Lions	W 35–21	11–5	Heinz Field	Recap

=== Game summaries ===
==== Week 1 (Sunday September 11, 2005): vs. Tennessee Titans ====
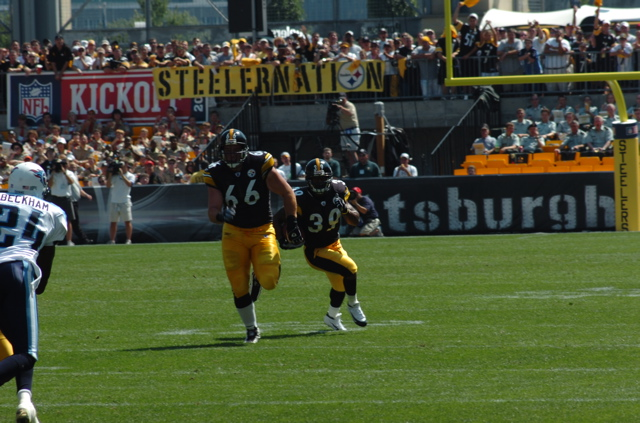
Alan Faneca blocks for Willie Parker

	1	2	3	4	Total
Titans	7	0	0	0	7
Steelers	7	13	14	0	34

at Heinz Field, Pittsburgh, Pennsylvania

- Game time: 1:00 p.m. EDT
- Game weather: 76 °F (24 °C) (Mostly Sunny)
- Game attendance: 62,931
- Referee: Gerald Austin
- TV announcers: (CBS) Kevin Harlan (play by play), Randy Cross (color commentator)

Ben Roethlisberger became the NFL's first quarterback since Trent Green in 2003 to post a perfect (158.3) passer rating, and college backup Willie Parker put up 161 rushing yards and a touchdown in a dazzling NFL debut.

==== Week 2 (Sunday September 18, 2005): at Houston Texans ====
	1	2	3	4	Total
Steelers	10	10	7	0	27
Texans	0	0	7	0	7

at Reliant Stadium, Houston, Texas

- Game time: 1:00 p.m. EDT
- Game weather: 95 °F (35 °C) (Sunny)
- Game attendance: 70,742
- Referee: Bill Vinovich
- TV announcers: (CBS) Don Criqui (play by play), Steve Tasker (color commentator)

Pittsburgh strong safety Troy Polamalu led a defensive onslaught with a career-high three of the Steelers' eight sacks, and Willie Parker followed up his outstanding NFL debut with 111 rushing yards and a touchdown on 25 carries as the Steelers hammered the Texans.

As the game took place on a hot, humid day, the Texans left the roof of Reliant Stadium open in the hopes that the Steelers' performance would be hampered by their black jerseys. However, the tactic failed and Houston fans were angered by having to sit in sweltering conditions and watch their team lose.

==== Week 3 (Sunday September 25, 2005): vs. New England Patriots ====
	1	2	3	4	Total
Patriots	7	0	3	13	23
Steelers	10	0	3	7	20

at Heinz Field, Pittsburgh, Pennsylvania

- Game time: 4:15 p.m. EDT
- Game weather: 82 °F (28 °C) (Cloudy)
- Game attendance: 64,868
- Referee: Bill Carollo
- TV announcers: (CBS) Jim Nantz (play by play), Phil Simms (color commentator), Bonnie Bernstein (sideline reporter)

New England quarterback Tom Brady led a five-play, 37-yard drive to Adam Vinatieri's game-winning 43-yard field goal with :01 remaining. The drive countered Hines Ward's 4-yard scoring catch that tied the score at 20–20, but left 1:25 for Brady to march the Patriot offense. On the day, Brady completed 31 of 41 passes for 372 yards, with an interception.

==== Week 5 (Monday October 10, 2005): at San Diego Chargers ====
	1	2	3	4	Total
Steelers	0	14	0	10	24
Chargers	0	7	6	9	22

at Qualcomm Stadium, San Diego, California

- Game time: 9:00 p.m. EDT
- Game weather:
- Game attendance: 68,537
- Referee: Jeff Triplette
- TV announcers: (ABC) Al Michaels (play by play), John Madden (color commentator), Sam Ryan (sideline reporter)

The Steelers returned to Monday night football for the first time since 2003 after being exiled for a year due to the 6–10 record. Jeff Reed booted a 40-yard field goal with :06 remaining to lift the Steelers to a win, but a play late in the game caused star quarterback Ben Roethlisberger to leave with a hyperextended knee and left his availability for the following week in doubt. The hit came from Charger rookie defensive lineman Luis Castillo and forced Roethlisberger to the sideline, and backup Charlie Batch merely handed off to Jerome Bettis three times to set up Reed's kick.

==== Week 6 (Sunday October 16, 2005): vs. Jacksonville Jaguars ====
	1	2	3	4	OT	Total
Jaguars	7	3	7	0	6	23
Steelers	0	14	0	3	0	17

at Heinz Field, Pittsburgh, Pennsylvania

- Game time: 1:00 p.m. EDT
- Game weather: 54 °F (12 °C) (Partly Sunny)
- Game attendance: 63,891
- Referee: Terry McAulay
- TV announcers: (CBS) Dick Enberg (play by play), Dan Dierdorf (color commentator), Armen Keteyian (sideline reporter)

Tommy Maddox capped a poor performance by throwing an overtime pass into a crowd of Jaguar defenders, and Rashean Mathis made him pay dearly, intercepting the pass and returning it 41 yards for the game-winning touchdown. Subbing for an injured Ben Roethlisberger (hyperextended knee), Maddox completed just 11 of 28 passes for 154 yards, with a touchdown and three interceptions.

==== Week 7 (Sunday October 23, 2005): at Cincinnati Bengals ====
	1	2	3	4	Total
Steelers	0	7	17	3	27
Bengals	3	3	0	7	13

at Paul Brown Stadium, Cincinnati, Ohio

- Game time: 1:00 p.m. EDT
- Game weather:
- Game attendance: 66,104
- Referee: Tony Corrente
- TV announcers: (CBS) Kevin Harlan (play by play), Randy Cross (color commentator)

Pittsburgh regrouped following a sloppy first quarter to take an easy win in Cincinnati. After allowing two marches into the Steeler red zone, the defense tightened and gave up only two field goals, then coasted on the heels of two Ben Roethlisberger touchdown strikes and 131 rushing yards from Willie Parker.

==== Week 8 (Monday October 31, 2005): vs. Baltimore Ravens ====
	1	2	3	4	Total
Ravens	7	3	0	9	19
Steelers	7	3	7	3	20

at Heinz Field, Pittsburgh, Pennsylvania

- Game time: 9:00 p.m. EST
- Game weather: 56 °F (13 °C) (Partly Cloudy)
- Game attendance: 64,187
- Referee: Pete Morelli
- TV announcers: (ABC) Al Michaels (play by play), John Madden (color commentator), Sam Ryan (sideline reporter)

Underachieving against a Ravens team missing defensive standouts Ray Lewis and Ed Reed, the Steelers regrouped on the heels of a late 60-yard drive that set up Jeff Reed's game-winning 37-yard field goal with 1:36 remaining. Ben Roethlisberger completed 18 of 30 passes for 177 yards, 2 touchdowns and an interception.

==== Week 9 (Sunday November 6, 2005): at Green Bay Packers ====
	1	2	3	4	Total
Steelers	6	7	0	7	20
Packers	3	0	7	0	10

at Lambeau Field, Green Bay, Wisconsin

- Game time: 4:15 p.m. EST
- Game weather:
- Game attendance: 70,607
- Referee: Ed Hochuli
- TV announcers: (CBS) Jim Nantz (play by play), Phil Simms (color commentator), Bonnie Bernstein (sideline reporter)

With Charlie Batch starting at quarterback for an injured Ben Roethlisberger (knee), the Steelers capitalized on Packer mistakes – three turnovers – and won despite a lackluster offensive showing. The game's highlight came from Troy Polamalu, whose sack of Brett Favre forced a fumble that Polamalu himself scooped up and returned 77 yards for a second-quarter touchdown.

==== Week 10 (Sunday November 13, 2005): vs. Cleveland Browns ====
	1	2	3	4	Total
Browns	7	0	0	14	21
Steelers	0	17	7	10	34

at Heinz Field, Pittsburgh, Pennsylvania

- Game time: 8:30 p.m. EST
- Game weather: 57 °F (14 °C) (Cloudy)
- Game attendance: 63,491
- Referee: Larry Nemmers
- TV announcers: (ESPN) Mike Patrick (play by play), Joe Theismann and Paul Maguire (color commentators), Suzy Kolber (sideline reporter)

The Steelers handled the division-rival Browns despite another serious quarterback injury. Backup Charlie Batch, subbing for Ben Roethlisberger, broke his hand late in the first half and exited. Beleaguered third-stringer Tommy Maddox inherited a 17–7 third-quarter lead and, despite some miscues, cruised to the win. Wide receiver (and college quarterback) Antwaan Randle El completed a 51-yard scoring pass to Hines Ward in the third, making Ward the team's all-time receptions leader (passing Hall of Fame wideout John Stallworth).

==== Week 11 (Sunday November 20, 2005): at Baltimore Ravens ====
	1	2	3	4	OT	Total
Steelers	0	6	0	7	0	13
Ravens	0	13	0	0	3	16

at M&T Bank Stadium, Baltimore, Maryland

- Game time: 1:00 p.m. EST
- Game weather:
- Game attendance: 70,601
- Referee: Ron Winter
- TV announcers: (CBS) Ian Eagle (play by play), Solomon Wilcots (color commentator)

An anemic offensive showing led to a surprising Steeler defeat at the hands of the Ray Lewis-less Ravens. Third-team quarterback Tommy Maddox got the starting nod and completed 19 of 36 passes for 230 yards, with a touchdown and an interception (a bizarre play that caromed off of wideout Hines Ward's swinging foot and was snatched by Terrell Suggs), but the Steelers' inability to handle the Raven pass rush was a serious blow. Maddox was sacked six times and under nearly constant duress. Matt Stover won the game on a 44-yard field goal in overtime.

==== Week 12 (Monday November 28, 2005): at Indianapolis Colts ====
	1	2	3	4	Total
Steelers	7	0	0	0	7
Colts	10	6	7	3	26

at RCA Dome, Indianapolis, Indiana

- Game time: 9:00 p.m. EST
- Game weather: Dome
- Game attendance: 57,442
- Referee: Bill Leavy
- TV announcers: (ABC) Al Michaels (play by play), John Madden (color commentator), Sam Ryan (sideline reporter)

The banged-up Steelers were simply no match for the undefeated Colts on Monday Night. Indianapolis' first offensive play proved a harbinger for the Steelers, with Marvin Harrison scorching Pittsburgh cornerback Ike Taylor on an 80-yard touchdown strike and a 7–0 advantage. Ben Roethlisberger's return from a two-game absence (knee injury) was a shaky one; his first interception potentially caused a six-point swing, snuffing out a Steeler drive late in the first half and setting up the Colts to kick a field goal, taking a 16–7 lead into the break. Roethlisberger's struggles were heightened when injured left tackle Marvel Smith grew less and less able to deal with All-Pro Colt pass rusher Dwight Freeney & Co., and eventually left with an ankle injury.

==== Week 13 (Sunday December 4, 2005): vs. Cincinnati Bengals ====
	1	2	3	4	Total
Bengals	7	14	10	7	38
Steelers	14	3	7	7	31

at Heinz Field, Pittsburgh, Pennsylvania

- Game time: 1:00 p.m. EST
- Game weather: 30 °F (−1 °C) (Flurries)
- Game attendance: 63,044
- Referee: Bernie Kukar
- TV announcers: (CBS) Dick Enberg (play by play), Dan Dierdorf (color commentator), Armen Keteyian (sideline reporter)

Ben Roethlisberger put up the most prolific numbers of his young career in his return from a knee injury, but he was ultimately out dueled by Carson Palmer. Roethlisberger outpassed his counterpart 386–227 and each threw three touchdowns, but his three interceptions were backbreakers. Ultimately, the Bengals simply made too many big plays, including a 94-yard kickoff return by Tab Perry, for the Steelers to keep pace.

==== Week 14 (Sunday December 11, 2005): vs. Chicago Bears ====
Chicago Bears (9–3) at Pittsburgh Steelers (7–5)

Quarter	1	2	3	4	Total
Bears	3	0	0	6	9
Steelers	7	7	7	0	21

at Heinz Field • Pittsburgh, Pennsylvania

- Date: December 11
- Game time: 1:00 p.m. EST
- Game weather: Snow • 32 °F (0 °C) • Wind 12 mph (19 km/h)
- Game attendance: 61,237
- Referee: Bill Vinovich
- TV announcers (FOX): Dick Stockton, Daryl Johnston, Tony Siragusa
- Pro-Football-Reference.com

Game information

Bears

- Kyle Orton
  17/35, 207 Yds
- Thomas Jones
  14 Rush, 72 Yds, TD
- Muhsin Muhammad
  8 Rec, 91 Yds

Steelers

- Ben Roethlisberger
  13/20, 173 Yds, TD
- Jerome Bettis
  17 Rush, 101 Yds, 2 TD
- Willie Parker
  2 Rec, 45 Yds

In a snowy atmosphere, the Steelers snapped their three-game losing streak by ending the Bears' eight-game winning run. Jerome Bettis churned through the snow and mud for a season-high 101 rushing yards, scoring twice in the physical win.

Scoring summary

Quarter	Time	Drive			Team	Scoring information	Score	
Quarter	Time	Plays	Yards	TOP	Team	Scoring information	CHI	PIT
1	9:16				Steelers	Ward 14-yard touchdown reception from Roethlisberger, Reed kick good	0	7
1	2:30				Bears	29-yard field goal by Gould	3	7
2	7:25				Steelers	Bettis 1-yard touchdown run, Reed kick good	3	14
3	7:25				Steelers	Bettis 5-yard touchdown run, Reed kick good	3	21
4	13:38				Bears	Jones 1-yard touchdown run, Gould kick no good	9	21
"TOP" = time of possession. For other American football terms, see Glossary of American football.							9	21

==== Week 15 (Sunday December 18, 2005): at Minnesota Vikings ====
	1	2	3	4	Total
Steelers	3	7	6	2	18
Vikings	3	0	0	0	3

at Hubert H. Humphrey Metrodome, Minneapolis, Minnesota

- Game time: 1:00 p.m. EST
- Game weather: Dome
- Game attendance: 64,136
- Referee: Ed Hochuli
- TV announcers: (CBS) Kevin Harlan (play by play), Randy Cross (color commentator)

Desperately trying to keep pace in the AFC playoff picture, the Steelers again dominated an NFC North opponent and again snapped a winning streak. The Vikings had won six straight games, but were pounded up and down the field in losing to Pittsburgh. The Steelers forced three Minnesota turnovers and added a safety in the victory.

==== Week 16 (Saturday December 24, 2005): at Cleveland Browns ====
	1	2	3	4	Total
Steelers	14	6	14	7	41
Browns	0	0	0	0	0

at Cleveland Browns Stadium, Cleveland, Ohio

- Game time: 1:00 p.m. EST
- Game weather: 45 °F (7 °C) (Cloudy)
- Game attendance: 73,136
- Referee: Bill Carollo
- TV announcers: (CBS) Gus Johnson (play by play), Steve Tasker (color commentator)

The Steelers turned a nearly flawless performance into a dominating win in Cleveland. The Browns were sacked eight times and were never really in the game. Willie Parker's 80-yard touchdown scamper in the third quarter broke the game open at 27–0. Ben Roethlisberger completed 13 of 20 passes for 226 yards and a touchdown before giving way to Charlie Batch with the game well in hand.

==== Week 17 (Sunday January 1, 2006): vs. Detroit Lions ====
	1	2	3	4	Total
Lions	14	0	7	0	21
Steelers	14	7	14	0	35

at Heinz Field, Pittsburgh, Pennsylvania

- Game time: 1:00 p.m. EST
- Game weather: 37 °F (3 °C) (Partly Sunny)
- Game attendance: 63,794
- Referee: Walt Coleman
- TV announcers: (FOX) Ron Pitts (play by play), Tim Ryan (color commentator)

Mere weeks after being all but counted out in an extremely tight AFC playoff race, the Steelers clinched a Wild Card berth, trading punches with lowly Detroit and coming out on top. Unexpectedly, the 5–10 Lions leapt to a 14–7 first-quarter lead on two Joey Harrington touchdown passes, but Jerome Bettis tied the game later in the period with the first of his three touchdown runs in his final game in Pittsburgh. Bettis and Willie Parker combined for 176 rushing yards as the Steelers closed out their regular season.

== Playoffs ==
Round	Date	Opponent (seed)	Result	Record	Venue	Recap
Wild Card	January 8	at Cincinnati Bengals (3)	W 31–17	1–0	Paul Brown Stadium	Recap
Divisional	January 15	at Indianapolis Colts (1)	W 21–18	2–0	RCA Dome	Recap
AFC Championship	January 22	at Denver Broncos (2)	W 34–17	3–0	Invesco Field at Mile High	Recap
Super Bowl XL	February 5	vs. Seattle Seahawks (N1)	W 21–10	4–0	Ford Field	Recap

=== Game summaries ===
==== AFC Wild Card Playoffs: at (#3) Cincinnati Bengals ====
AFC wild card game: (#6) Pittsburgh Steelers (11–5) at (#3) Cincinnati Bengals (11–5)

Quarter	1	2	3	4	Total
Steelers	0	14	14	3	31
Bengals	10	7	0	0	17

at Paul Brown Stadium • Cincinnati, Ohio

- Date: January 8, 2006
- Game time: 4:30 p.m. EDT
- Game weather: Partly cloudy • 61 °F (16 °C) • Wind SW 22 miles per hour (35 km/h; 19 kn)
- Game attendance: 65,870
- Referee: Larry Nemmers
- TV announcers (CBS): Jim Nantz, Phil Simms, and Bonnie Bernstein
- Game Book

Game information

Steelers

- Ben Roethlisberger
  14/19, 208 Yds, 3 TD
- Jerome Bettis
  10 Rush, 52 Yds, TD
- Cedrick Wilson
  3 Rec, 104 Yds, TD

Bengals

- Jon Kitna
  24/40, 197 Yds, TD, 2 INT
- Rudi Johnson
  13 Rush, 56 Yds, TD
- Kevin Walter
  5 Rec, 73 Yds

Carson Palmer tore his ACL on his first pass attempt after a tackle by Kimo von Oelhoffen.

Scoring summary

Quarter	Time	Drive			Team	Scoring information	Score	
Quarter	Time	Plays	Yards	TOP	Team	Scoring information	PIT	CIN
1	6:54	9	84	4:25	Bengals	23-yard field goal by Shayne Graham	0	3
1	1:09	7	76	3:26	Bengals	Rudi Johnson 20-yard touchdown run, Shayne Graham kick good	0	10
2	13:11	8	60	2:58	Steelers	Willie Parker 19-yard touchdown reception from Ben Roethlisberger, Jeff Reed kick good	7	10
2	6:13	14	57	6:58	Bengals	T.J. Houshmandzadeh 7-yard touchdown reception from Jon Kitna, Shayne Graham kick good	7	17
2	3:48	6	76	2:25	Steelers	Hines Ward 5-yard touchdown reception from Ben Roethlisberger, Jeff Reed kick good	14	17
3	5:12	8	66	4:39	Steelers	Jerome Bettis 5-yard touchdown run, Jeff Reed kick good	21	17
3	1:13	3	50	1:35	Steelers	Cedrick Wilson 43-yard touchdown reception from Ben Roethlisberger, Jeff Reed kick good	28	17
4	10:29	6	37	2:56	Steelers	21-yard field goal by Jeff Reed	31	17
"TOP" = time of possession. For other American football terms, see Glossary of American football.							31	17

==== AFC Divisional Playoffs: at (#1) Indianapolis Colts ====
AFC Divisional Playoff: (#6) Pittsburgh Steelers (11–5) at (#1) Indianapolis Colts (14–2)

Quarter	1	2	3	4	Total
Steelers	14	0	7	0	21
Colts	0	3	0	15	18

at RCA Dome • Indianapolis, Indiana

- Date: January 15, 2006
- Game time: 1:00 p.m. EDT
- Game weather: Indoors (dome)
- Game attendance: 57,449
- Referee: Pete Morelli
- TV announcers (CBS): Dick Enberg, Dan Dierdorf, and Armen Keteyian
- Game Book

Game information

Steelers

- Ben Roethlisberger
  14/24, 197 Yds, 2 TD, INT
- Willie Parker
  17 Rush, 59 Yds
- Hines Ward
  3 Rec, 68 Yds

Colts

- Peyton Manning
  22/38, 290 Yds, TD
- Edgerrin James
  13 Rush, 56 Yds, TD
- Reggie Wayne
  7 Rec, 97 Yds

The Steelers became the first No. 6 playoff seed (since the league expanded to a 12-team playoff format in 1990) to defeat a No. 1 seed, and also the first No. 6 seed to reach a conference championship game.

Roethlisberger's game-saving tackle on Harper would later be known as "The Immaculate Redemption" or just "The Tackle".

Scoring summary

Quarter	Time	Drive			Team	Scoring information	Score	
Quarter	Time	Plays	Yards	TOP	Team	Scoring information	PIT	IND
1	9:25	10	84	5:35	Steelers	Antwaan Randle El 6-yard touchdown reception from Ben Roethlisberger, Jeff Reed kick good	7	0
1	3:12	7	72	2:53	Steelers	Heath Miller 7-yard touchdown reception from Ben Roethlisberger, Jeff Reed kick good	14	0
2	1:20	15	96	9:39	Colts	20-yard field goal by Mike Vanderjagt	14	3
3	1:26	6	30	3:21	Steelers	1 Jerome Bettis-yard touchdown run, Jeff Reed kick good	21	3
4	14:09	6	72	2:17	Colts	Dallas Clark 50-yard touchdown reception from Peyton Manning, Mike Vanderjagt kick good	21	10
4	4:24	6	80	1:39	Colts	Edgerrin James 3-yard touchdown run, 2-point pass good	21	18
"TOP" = time of possession. For other American football terms, see Glossary of American football.							21	18

==== AFC Championship: at (#2) Denver Broncos ====
	1	2	3	4	Total
Steelers	3	21	0	10	34
Broncos	0	3	7	7	17

at Invesco Field at Mile High, Denver, Colorado

- Game time: 3:00 p.m. EST
- Game weather: 40 °F (4 °C) (Partly Sunny)
- Game attendance: 76,775
- Referee: Terry McAulay
- TV announcers: (CBS) Jim Nantz (play by play), Phil Simms (color commentator), Bonnie Bernstein and Armen Keteyian (sideline reporters)

==== Super Bowl XL: vs. (N1) Seattle Seahawks ====
	1	2	3	4	Total
Seahawks	3	0	7	0	10
Steelers	0	7	7	7	21

at Ford Field, Detroit, Michigan

- Game time: 6:30 p.m. EST
- Game weather: Dome
- Game attendance: 68,206
- Referee: Bill Leavy
- TV announcers: (ABC) Al Michaels (play by play), John Madden (color commentator), Michele Tafoya and Suzy Kolber (sideline reporters)

The Pittsburgh Steelers became the fourth wild card team to win the Super Bowl, and the first to have done so while winning three playoff games on the road. Hines Ward was the Super Bowl MVP, recording 5 catches for 143 yards and a touchdown.

== Standings ==
AFC North
	W	L	T	PCT	DIV	CONF	PF	PA	STK
^{(3)} Cincinnati Bengals	11	5	0	.688	5–1	7–5	421	350	L2
^{(6)} Pittsburgh Steelers	11	5	0	.688	4–2	7–5	389	258	W4
Baltimore Ravens	6	10	0	.375	2–4	4–8	265	299	L1
Cleveland Browns	6	10	0	.375	1–5	4–8	232	301	W1

== Honors and awards ==
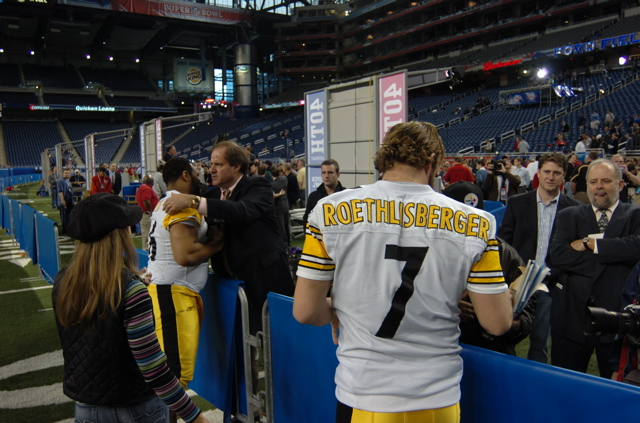
Super Bowl winners Ben Roethlisberger and Jerome Bettis with sportscaster Chris Berman at Super Bowl XL media day

=== Pro Bowl representatives ===
See: 2006 Pro Bowl

- No. 43 Troy Polamalu- Strong safety
- No. 55 Joey Porter- Outside linebacker
- No. 64 Jeff Hartings- Center
- No. 66 Alan Faneca- Offensive guard
- No. 98 Casey Hampton- Nose tackle
