= 2004 Pittsburgh Steelers season =

Pittsburgh Steelers 72nd US football season

- Owner: The Rooney family
- General manager: Kevin Colbert
- Head coach: Bill Cowher
- Home stadium: Heinz Field

Results
- Record: 15–1
- Division place: 1st AFC North
- Playoffs: Won Divisional Playoffs (vs. Jets) 20–17 (OT); Lost AFC Championship (vs. Patriots) 27–41
- All-Pros: 6: Alan Faneca (1st team); James Farrior (1st team); Jeff Hartings (1st team); Troy Polamalu (2nd team); Joey Porter (2nd team); Hines Ward (2nd team)
- Pro Bowlers: 9: G Alan Faneca; ILB James Farrior; C Jeff Hartings; OLB Joey Porter; DE Aaron Smith; OT Marvel Smith; WR Hines Ward; RB Jerome Bettis; SS Troy Polamalu
- Team MVP: James Farrior
- Team ROY: Ben Roethlisberger

The 2004 Pittsburgh Steelers season was the franchise's 72nd season as a professional sports franchise and as a member of the National Football League. It would be the first season the franchise would have under quarterback Ben Roethlisberger. He would play 18 seasons as a Steeler, a franchise record.

The team looked to come back after a disappointing 6–10 season the year before, which saw the team go through the entire season without winning consecutive games.

The team finished with a 15–1 record, topping the 14–2 team record from 1978 and joined the 1984 San Francisco 49ers, the 1985 Chicago Bears, and the 1998 Minnesota Vikings as the only teams in NFL history to that point since the league adopted a 16-game schedule in 1978 to finish with such a record. This also made the Steelers the first AFC team to achieve a 15–1 record, a conference-best at the time (the 2007 Patriots would surpass that by going a perfect 16–0); they are also the only AFC team to do so. Along the way, the Steelers ended the New England Patriots' NFL-record 21-game winning streak in Week 8, then defeated their cross-state rival Philadelphia Eagles the following week to hand the NFL's last two undefeated teams their first losses in back-to-back weeks, both at home.

The season was highlighted by the surprising emergence of rookie quarterback Ben Roethlisberger, the team's top pick in that year's draft. Originally intended to sit behind veteran Tommy Maddox the entire season, plans abruptly changed when Maddox was hurt in the team's Week 2 loss to Baltimore. Surrounded by talent, "Big Ben" went an NFL-record 13–0 as a rookie starting quarterback before being rested for the final game of the season, shattering the old NFL record (and coincidentally, also the team record) of 6–0 to start an NFL career set by Mike Kruczek filling in for an injured Terry Bradshaw in 1976.

The Steelers hosted the AFC Championship for the fifth time in eleven years. However, for the fourth time in that same span, the Steelers lost at home one game away from the Super Bowl, and, like in 2001, lost to the Patriots in a rematch from Week 8.

The 2006 edition of Pro Football Prospectus listed the 2004 Steelers as one of their "Heartbreak Seasons", in which teams "dominated the entire regular season only to falter in the playoffs, unable to close the deal." Said Pro Football Prospectus, "In the playoffs, Roethlisberger hit an inconvenient slump, just like the Pittsburgh quarterbacks who came before him. He threw two killer interceptions against the Jets, but the Steelers were bailed out when Jets kicker Doug Brien missed a game-winning field goal. The next week against New England, head coach Bill Cowher was clearly worried about Roethlisberger, letting him throw only once on first or second down in the first quarter. By the time the offense opened up, the Patriots were beating the Steelers by two touchdowns. A Roethlisberger interception was returned 87 yards for a touchdown by Rodney Harrison, and the game was effectively over. For the second time in seven years, a 15–1 team had failed to make it to the Super Bowl. This was the first of, through the 2024 season, 21 consecutive non-losing seasons for the Steelers.

The Steelers led the NFL in rushing attempts for the second time in four years, running the ball 618 times.

== Offseason ==
Free agent-wise, the Steelers would sign former Philadelphia Eagles running back Duce Staley. Many thought this signing was the team preparing for a future without Jerome Bettis. However, Staley's injury-prone history from Philly would continue with the Steelers. On the undrafted front, the team signed North Carolina running back Willie Parker. Although Parker would play sparingly his rookie season, he would become a major component of the offense in the future. The team also signed veteran punter Chris Gardocki (releasing longtime punter Josh Miller in the process), who up to that point was best remembered by Steelers fans for flipping head coach Bill Cowher the finger twice on live TV after being leveled by Joey Porter while Gardocki was with the Cleveland Browns. (Porter would be penalized for roughing the punter.) Gardocki was fined $5,000 for the incident, and his signing by the team made him the only player to have played for Cowher and give him an expletive in public.

The most notable releases made in the offseason included releasing veteran defensive players Jason Gildon and Dewayne Washington, who both would subsequently sign with the Jacksonville Jaguars and would both play against the Steelers in Week 13.

In the personnel department, the Steelers went back to the future with the return of "Mean Joe" Greene and Dick LeBeau to the organization. Greene, who along with the entire Arizona Cardinals coaching staff was fired after the dismissal of head coach Dave McGinnis, retired from coaching and returned to the Black & Gold as the "special assistant of player personnel" for the team. Meanwhile, LeBeau, who popularized the zone blitz defensive schemes as the team's defensive coordinator in the mid-1990s (referred to as "Blitzburgh" by fans), returned to the team in that same capacity after a brief stint with the Buffalo Bills, replacing the fired Tim Lewis.

This would also be the final season for longtime Steelers radio color commentator Myron Cope, who missed several games this year due to poor health. It was one of only two times in 35 years that Cope would miss time broadcasting for the Steelers, the other being the 1994 season after the death of his wife. Though Cope would later recover, he felt that it was best to retire, and did so at the end of the season.

Additions	Subtractions
RB Duce Staley (Eagles)	TE Mark Bruener (Texans)
P Chris Gardocki (Browns)	P Josh Miller (Patriots)
CB Willie Williams (Seahawks)	S Brent Alexander (Giants)
DE Travis Kirschke (49ers)	CB Dewayne Washington (Jaguars)
	T Todd Fordham (Panthers)
	LB Jason Gildon (Bills)

=== NFL draft ===
The Steelers went into the NFL draft with the eleventh overall pick, their highest selection since selecting Plaxico Burress eighth overall in 2000. Although the team was ready to select Miami University quarterback Ben Roethlisberger if he were to still be available, the team was ready to select other players at "need" positions. However, with Roethlisberger still available, the team snatched him up, making him the third quarterback selected. Alongside Eli Manning, Philip Rivers, and J. P. Losman, Roethlisberger was part of the "Class of 2004" quarterbacks. In addition, "Big Ben" became the first quarterback the Steelers selected with their first-round pick since they selected Mark Malone in 1980.

2004 Pittsburgh Steelers draft
Round	Pick	Player	Position	College	Notes
1	11	Ben Roethlisberger *	Quarterback	Miami (OH)	
2	38	Ricardo Colclough	Cornerback	Tusculum	
3	75	Max Starks	Offensive tackle	Florida	
5	145	Nathaniel Adibi	Defensive end	Virginia Tech	
6	177	Bo Lacy	Offensive tackle	Arkansas	
6	194	Matt Kranchick	Tight end	Penn State	
6	197	Drew Caylor	Center	Stanford	
7	212	Eric Taylor	Defensive tackle	Memphis	
Made roster † Pro Football Hall of Fame * Made at least one Pro Bowl during career

=== Undrafted free agents ===
2004 undrafted free agents of note
Player	Position	College
Allen Augustin	Lineabcker	Florida State
Robert Blizzard	Tight end	North Carolina
Zamir Cobb	Wide receiver	Temple
Darryl Kennedy	Fullback	Syracuse
Glenn Martinez	Wide receiver	Saginaw Valley State
Nick McNeil	Linebacker	Western Carolina
Willie Parker	Running back	North Carolina
Janssen Patton	Safety	Bowling Green
Dedrick Roper	Linebacker	Northwood
Yaacov Yisrael	Safety	Penn State

== Personnel ==
=== Staff / coaches ===
2004 Pittsburgh Steelers staff
Front office {{{front_office}}} Head coaches {{{head_coach}}} Offensive coaches: Offensive coordinator – Ken Whisenhunt; Quarterbacks – Mark Whipple; Running backs – Dick Hoak; Wide receivers – Bruce Arians; Tight ends – James Daniel; Offensive assistant – Matt Raich	Defensive coaches {{{defensive}}}

Notable additions include Ben Roethlisberger and Willie Parker.

=== Roster ===
2004 Pittsburgh Steelers roster
Quarterbacks (QB): 8 Tommy Maddox; 7 Ben Roethlisberger; 2 Brian St. Pierre; Running backs (RB): 36 Jerome Bettis; 34 Verron Haynes; 35 Dan Kreider FB; 39 Willie Parker; 22 Duce Staley; Wide receivers (WR): 80 Plaxico Burress; 89 Lee Mays; 81 Sean Morey; 82 Antwaan Randle El; 86 Hines Ward; Tight ends (TE): 48 Matt Cushing; 88 Matt Kranchick; 87 Walter Rasby; 84 Jerame Tuman	Offensive linemen (OL): 72 Barrett Brooks G/T; 66 Alan Faneca G; 64 Jeff Hartings C; 74 Jim Jones G; 56 Chukky Okobi C/G; 79 Oliver Ross T; 77 Marvel Smith T; 78 Max Starks T; 68 Keydrick Vincent G; Defensive linemen (DL): 96 Kendrick Clancy NT; 76 Chris Hoke NT; 99 Brett Keisel DE; 90 Travis Kirschke DE; 91 Aaron Smith DE; 67 Kimo von Oelhoffen DE	Linebackers (LB): 97 Kendrell Bell ILB; 51 James Farrior ILB; 50 Larry Foote ILB; 53 Clark Haggans OLB; 92 James Harrison OLB; 95 Alonzo Jackson OLB; 57 Clint Kriewaldt ILB; 55 Joey Porter OLB; Defensive backs (DB): 23 Tyrone Carter CB/S; 21 Ricardo Colclough CB; 28 Chris Hope FS; 29 Chidi Iwuoma CB; 43 Troy Polamalu SS; 30 Chad Scott CB; 33 Russell Stuvaints FS; 24 Ike Taylor CB; 26 Deshea Townsend CB; 27 Willie Williams CB; Special teams (ST): 17 Chris Gardocki P; 3 Jeff Reed K; 54 Mike Schneck LS	Practice squad: 74 Grant Bowman NT; 15 Chris Collins WR; 25 Vontez Duff CB; 44 Dedrick Roper LB; 69 Eric Taylor NT; 65 Lenny Vandermade C/G; 49 J. T. Wall FB; 18 Walter Young WR; Reserve: 16 Charlie Batch QB (IR); 37 Ainsley Battles S (IR); 19 Zamir Cobb WR (IR); 98 Casey Hampton NT (IR); 31 Mike Logan S (IR); 85 Jay Riemersma TE (IR); 73 Kendall Simmons G (IR); Rookies in italics 53 active, 7 reserve, 8 practice squad

== Preseason ==
=== Schedule ===
Week	Date	Opponent	Result	Record	Game site	NFL recap
1	August 14	at Detroit Lions	L 21–27	0–1	Ford Field	
2	August 21	Houston Texans	W 38–3	1–1	Heinz Field	
3	August 26	at Philadelphia Eagles	W 27–21	2–1	Lincoln Financial Field	
4	September 2	Carolina Panthers	L 13–16	2–2	Heinz Field	

== Regular season ==
=== Schedule ===
Week	Date	Opponent	Result	Record	Game site	NFL recap
1	September 12	Oakland Raiders	**W** 24–21	1–0	Heinz Field	Summary
2	September 19	at **Baltimore Ravens**	**L** 13–30	1–1	M&T Bank Stadium	Summary
3	September 26	at Miami Dolphins	**W** 13–3	2–1	Pro Player Stadium	Summary
4	October 3	**Cincinnati Bengals**	**W** 28–17	3–1	Heinz Field	Summary
5	October 10	**Cleveland Browns**	**W** 34–23	4–1	Heinz Field	Summary
6	October 17	at Dallas Cowboys	**W** 24–20	5–1	Texas Stadium	Summary
7	Bye					
8	October 31	New England Patriots	**W** 34–20	6–1	Heinz Field	Summary
9	November 7	Philadelphia Eagles	**W** 27–3	7–1	Heinz Field	Summary
10	November 14	at **Cleveland Browns**	**W** 24–10	8–1	Cleveland Browns Stadium	Summary
11	November 21	at **Cincinnati Bengals**	**W** 19–14	9–1	Paul Brown Stadium	Summary
12	November 28	Washington Redskins	**W** 16–7	10–1	Heinz Field	Summary
13	December 5	at Jacksonville Jaguars	**W** 17–16	11–1	Alltel Stadium	Summary
14	December 12	New York Jets	**W** 17–6	12–1	Heinz Field	Summary
15	December 18	at New York Giants	**W** 33–30	13–1	Giants Stadium	Summary
16	December 26	**Baltimore Ravens**	**W** 20–7	14–1	Heinz Field	Summary
17	January 2, 2005	at Buffalo Bills	**W** 29–24	15–1	Ralph Wilson Stadium	Summary
Note: Intra-divisional opponents are in **bold** text.

=== Game summaries ===
==== Week 1: vs. Oakland Raiders ====
Oakland Raiders at Pittsburgh Steelers

Team	1	2	3	4	Total
Raiders	0	7	3	11	21
• **Steelers**	7	7	7	3	24

- Date: Sunday, September 12
- Location: Heinz Field, Pittsburgh, Pennsylvania
- Game start: 1:00 p.m. EST
- Game attendance: 60,147
- Game weather: 78 °F (26 °C) (sunny)
- Referee: Walt Anderson
- TV announcers (CBS): Jim Nantz, Phil Simms, and Bonnie Bernstein

It was the 22nd lifetime meeting between the two clubs. The Raiders erased a 21-13 Steelers lead in the fourth quarter but Jeff Reed connected on the winning field goal with seven seconds left. With the win, the Steelers started their season 1–0 for the 2nd straight year. Jerome Bettis scored 18 points (3 Touchdowns) on 5 carries, yet gained only 1 yard total for an average of 0.2 yards per carry.

==== Week 2: at Baltimore Ravens ====
Pittsburgh Steelers at Baltimore Ravens

Team	1	2	3	4	Total
Steelers	0	0	0	13	13
• **Ravens**	7	6	7	10	30

- Date: Sunday, September 19
- Location: M&T Bank Stadium, Baltimore, Maryland
- Game start: 1:00 p.m. EST
- Game attendance: 69,895
- Referee: Walt Coleman
- TV announcers (CBS): Kevin Harlan and Randy Cross

With the loss, the Steelers fell to 1–1 for the 2nd straight year. 0–1 in division games and 1–1 in conference games.

==== Week 3: at Miami Dolphins ====
Pittsburgh Steelers at Miami Dolphins

Team	1	2	3	4	Total
• **Steelers**	3	0	3	7	13
Dolphins	0	0	0	3	3

- Date: Sunday, September 26
- Location: Pro Player Stadium, Miami, Florida
- Game start: 8:30 p.m. EST
- Game attendance: 72,225
- Game weather: 79 °F (26 °C) (Rain)
- Referee: Bill Leavy
- TV announcers (CBS - Local): Gus Johnson and Brent Jones

The game was originally to be played at 1:00 pm, but was delayed until evening due to Hurricane Jeanne. The game was not broadcast on CBS nationally, it was only shown on local stations in the primary and secondary markets of the two teams as well as on NFL Sunday Ticket. The halftime and in-game updates were produced by ESPN. With the win, the Steelers improved to 2–1. The contest marked Ben Roethlisberger's first NFL start and victory.

==== Week 4: vs. Cincinnati Bengals ====
Cincinnati Bengals at Pittsburgh Steelers

Team	1	2	3	4	Total
Bengals	7	3	7	0	17
• **Steelers**	7	7	0	14	28

- Date: Sunday, October 3
- Location: Heinz Field, Pittsburgh, Pennsylvania
- Game start: 1:00 p.m. EST
- Game attendance: 62,402
- Game weather: 63 °F (17 °C) (sunny)
- Referee: Terry McAulay
- TV announcers (CBS): Ian Eagle and Solomon Wilcots

With the win the Steelers improved to 3–1. 1–1 in division games.

==== Week 5: vs. Cleveland Browns ====
Cleveland Browns at Pittsburgh Steelers

Team	1	2	3	4	Total
Browns	10	3	3	7	23
• **Steelers**	14	13	7	0	34

- Date: Sunday, October 10
- Location: Heinz Field, Pittsburgh, Pennsylvania
- Game start: 1:00 p.m. EST
- Game attendance: 63,609
- Game weather: 54 °F (12 °C) (cloudy)
- Referee: Gerald Austin
- TV announcers (CBS): Gus Johnson and Steve Tasker

With their 2nd straight win over the Browns, the Steelers improved to 4–1.

==== Week 6: at Dallas Cowboys ====
Pittsburgh Steelers at Dallas Cowboys

Team	1	2	3	4	Total
• **Steelers**	7	3	0	14	24
Cowboys	7	3	10	0	20

- Date: Sunday, October 17
- Location: Texas Stadium, Irving, Texas
- Game start: 4:15 p.m. EST
- Game attendance: 64,162
- Referee: Mike Carey
- TV announcers (CBS): Jim Nantz, Phil Simms, and Bonnie Bernstein
- Source: ESPN

Scoring summary
1	9:14	Cowboys	Richie Anderson 21-yard run (Billy Cundiff kick)	Cowboys 7–0
1	5:22	Steelers	Plaxico Burress 5-yard pass from Ben Roethlisberger (Jeff Reed kick)	Tie 7–7
2	4:27	Steelers	Jeff Reed 51-yard field goal	Steelers 10–7
2	:15	Cowboys	Billy Cundiff 47-yard field goal	Tie 10–10
3	5:38	Cowboys	Billy Cundiff 39-yard field goal	Cowboys 13–10
3	2:57	Cowboys	Keyshawn Johnson 22-yard pass from Vinny Testaverde (Billy Cundiff kick)	Cowboys 20–10
4	11:48	Steelers	Jerame Tuman 7-yard pass from Ben Roethlisberger (Jeff Reed kick)	Cowboys 20–17
4	:30	Steelers	Jerome Bettis 2-yard run (Jeff Reed kick)	Steelers 24–20

It was the 29th meeting between the two clubs. The Cowboys jumped to a 20–10 lead following a Keyshawn Johnson touchdown catch in the third, but Ben Roethlisberger led two touchdown drives, the last a Jerome Bettis run with thirty seconds to go. The Cowboys raced to the Steelers 30 but a last-second touchdown attempt was swatted away by Russell Stuvaints. With the win, the Steelers went on their bye week 5–1.

==== Week 8: vs. New England Patriots ====
New England Patriots at Pittsburgh Steelers

Team	1	2	3	4	Total
Patriots	3	7	3	7	20
• **Steelers**	21	3	10	0	34

- Date: Sunday, October 31
- Location: Heinz Field, Pittsburgh, Pennsylvania
- Game start: 4:15 p.m. EST
- Game attendance: 64,737
- Game weather: 63 °F (17 °C) (sunny)
- Referee: Walt Coleman
- TV announcers (CBS): Jim Nantz, Phil Simms, and Bonnie Bernstein

This was the game that ended New England's NFL-record 21-game winning streak. Following an Adam Vinatieri field goal in the first quarter, the Steelers erupted, as Ben Roethlisberger twice hit Plaxico Burress for touchdowns and a Tom Brady interception was run back by Deshea Townsend for a touchdown and a 21–3 Steelers lead after one quarter. Brady was picked off twice and Roethlisberger made no mistakes in throwing for 196 yards and amassing a quarterback rating of 126.4. The Steelers routed the Patriots 34–20 and wound up winning the No. 1 seed in the AFC playoffs as a result. With the win, the Steelers improved to 6–1.

==== Week 9: vs. Philadelphia Eagles ====
Philadelphia Eagles at Pittsburgh Steelers

Team	1	2	3	4	Total
Eagles	0	3	0	0	3
• **Steelers**	14	7	3	3	27

- Date: Sunday, November 7
- Location: Heinz Field, Pittsburgh, Pennsylvania
- Game start: 1:00 p.m. EST
- Game attendance: 64,975
- Game weather: 66 °F (19 °C) (sunny)
- Referee: Bill Carollo
- TV announcers (Fox): Joe Buck, Troy Aikman, Cris Collinsworth, and Pam Oliver
- Source: ESPN

Scoring summary
1	8:56	Steelers	Hines Ward 16-yard run (Jeff Reed kick)	Steelers 7–0
1	2:27	Steelers	Hines Ward 20-yard pass from Ben Roethlisberger (Jeff Reed kick)	Steelers 14–0
2	10:51	Steelers	Jay Riemersma 2-yard pass from Ben Roethlisberger (Jeff Reed kick)	Steelers 21–0
2	6:14	Eagles	David Akers 33-yard field goal	Steelers 21–3
3	2:36	Steelers	Jeff Reed 42-yard field goal	Steelers 24–3
4	7:58	Steelers	Jeff Reed 31-yard field goal	Steelers 27–3

The Steelers for the 2nd week in a row face an undefeated team, the 7–0 Eagles. With the win, the Steelers improved to 7–1 while the Eagles dropped to 7–1. The game gained wider notoriety in subsequent days following broadcast of footage from the Eagles sideline where Terrell Owens was angrily barking at Donovan McNabb with McNabb striving to ignore him.

==== Week 10: at Cleveland Browns ====
Pittsburgh Steelers at Cleveland Browns

Team	1	2	3	4	Total
• **Steelers**	7	7	0	10	24
Browns	3	0	0	7	10

- Date: Sunday, November 14
- Location: Cleveland Browns Stadium, Cleveland, Ohio
- Game start: 1:00 p.m. EST
- Game attendance: 73,703
- Referee: Jeff Triplette
- TV announcers (CBS): Dick Enberg, Dan Dierdorf, and Armen Keteyian

With their 3rd straight win over the Browns, the Steelers improved to 8–1.

==== Week 11: at Cincinnati Bengals ====
Pittsburgh Steelers at Cincinnati Bengals

Team	1	2	3	4	Total
• **Steelers**	3	7	7	2	19
Bengals	7	7	0	0	14

- Date: Sunday, November 21
- Location: Paul Brown Stadium, Cincinnati, Ohio
- Game start: 1:00 p.m. EST
- Game attendance: 65,780
- Referee: Larry Nemmers
- TV announcers (CBS): Ian Eagle and Solomon Wilcots

The Bengals clawed to a 14–10 lead on two Carson Palmer touchdowns, but Roethlisberger, despite being sacked seven times, tossed a touchdown late in the third quarter to Dan Kreider, then late in the fourth Palmer dropped back to his own endzone and threw an incompletion; it was ruled intentional grounding and the resulting Pittsburgh safety finished off the game.

==== Week 12: vs. Washington Redskins ====
Washington Redskins at Pittsburgh Steelers

Team	1	2	3	4	Total
Redskins	0	0	7	0	7
• **Steelers**	3	10	0	3	16

- Date: Sunday, November 28
- Location: Heinz Field, Pittsburgh, Pennsylvania
- Game start: 1:00 p.m. EST
- Game attendance: 63,707
- Game weather: 39 °F (4 °C) (cloudy)
- Referee: Bernie Kukar
- TV announcers (Fox): Sam Rosen and Bill Maas

With the win the Steelers improved to 10–1 and went 3–0 against the NFC East.

==== Week 13: at Jacksonville Jaguars ====
Pittsburgh Steelers at Jacksonville Jaguars

Team	1	2	3	4	Total
• **Steelers**	7	7	0	3	17
Jaguars	7	0	6	3	16

- Date: Sunday, December 5
- Location: Alltel Stadium, Jacksonville, Florida
- Game start: 8:30 p.m. EST
- Game attendance: 76,877
- Referee: Bill Vinovich
- TV announcers (ESPN): Mike Patrick, Joe Theismann, Paul Maguire, and Suzy Kolber

For the first time, Jerome Bettis was not the all-time active rushing leader in the NFL upon kickoff, as he and Curtis Martin dueled throughout the season for the title. Bettis would retake the title by game's end.

==== Week 14: vs. New York Jets ====
New York Jets at Pittsburgh Steelers

Team	1	2	3	4	Total
Jets	0	0	3	3	6
• **Steelers**	3	0	0	14	17

- Date: Sunday, December 12
- Location: Heinz Field, Pittsburgh, Pennsylvania
- Game start: 4:05 p.m. EST
- Game attendance: 63,581
- Game weather: 38 °F (3 °C) (cloudy)
- Referee: Walt Anderson
- TV announcers (CBS): Jim Nantz, Phil Simms, and Bonnie Bernstein

In an NFL first, both running backs came into the game ready to break the 13,000 career yards mark, Jerome Bettis having a 6-yard lead over native Curtis Martin. After the game, Martin would lead Bettis by 9 yards.

==== Week 15: at New York Giants ====
Pittsburgh Steelers at New York Giants

Team	1	2	3	4	Total
• **Steelers**	10	10	3	10	33
Giants	14	0	10	6	30

- Date: Saturday, December 18
- Location: Giants Stadium, East Rutherford, New Jersey
- Game start: 1:30 p.m. EST
- Game attendance: 78,836
- Referee: Gerald Austin
- TV announcers (CBS): Jim Nantz, Phil Simms, and Bonnie Bernstein
- Source: ESPN

Scoring summary
1	14:45	Giants	Willie Ponder 91-yard kickoff return (Steve Christie kick)	Giants 7–0
1	7:26	Steelers	Verron Haynes 10-yard pass from Antwaan Randle El (Jeff Reed kick)	Tie 7–7
1	4:02	Giants	Jeremy Shockey 2-yard pass from Eli Manning (Steve Christie kick)	Giants 14–7
1	:19	Steelers	Jeff Reed 33-yard field goal	Giants 14–10
2	5:36	Steelers	Antwan Randle El 35-yard pass from Ben Roethlisberger (Jeff Reed kick)	Steelers 17–14
2	:14	Steelers	Jeff Reed 21-yard field goal	Steelers 20–14
3	8:35	Giants	Steve Christie 22-yard field goal	Steelers 20–17
3	4:24	Steelers	Jeff Reed 36-yard field goal	Steelers 23–17
3	:29	Giants	Marcellus Rivers 1-yard pass from Eli Manning (Steve Christie kick)	Giants 24–23
4	11:35	Steelers	Jeff Reed 28-yard field goal	Steelers 26–24
4	8:15	Giants	Tiki Barber 1-yard run (pass failed)	Giants 30–26
4	4:57	Steelers	Jerome Bettis 1-yard run (Jeff Reed kick)	Steelers 33–30

This was the first meeting between rookie quarterbacks Ben Roethlisberger and Eli Manning and was part of a rare NFL Saturday triple-header. The game lead tied or changed seven times as Manning and Roethlisberger combined for 498 passing yards; Antwaan Randle El also got into the act with a ten-yard touchdown throw to Verron Haynes, this atop 149 receiving yards. Jerome Bettis rushed 36 times for 140 yards and the winning touchdown in the final five minutes. With 3:31 to go Eli was intercepted by Willie J. Williams. Giants coach Tom Coughlin challenged the ruling but after review it was upheld, and the Steelers ran out the clock for the 33–30 win.

==== Week 16: vs. Baltimore Ravens ====
Baltimore Ravens at Pittsburgh Steelers

Team	1	2	3	4	Total
Ravens	7	0	0	0	7
• **Steelers**	7	3	7	3	20

- Date: Sunday, December 26
- Location: Heinz Field, Pittsburgh, Pennsylvania
- Game start: 1:00 p.m. EST
- Game attendance: 64,227
- Game weather: 27 °F (−3 °C) (cloudy)
- Referee: Jeff Triplette
- TV announcers (CBS): Gus Johnson and Brent Jones

Jerome Bettis retook the all-time active rushing record from his season-long duel with native Curtis Martin by a margin of 81 yards, and also pass Eric Dickerson for fourth all-time.

The win also helped the team improve to 14–1. This would tie the team's franchise record in number of wins in a season.

==== Week 17: at Buffalo Bills ====
Pittsburgh Steelers at Buffalo Bills

Team	1	2	3	4	Total
• **Steelers**	10	6	0	13	29
Bills	7	3	7	7	24

- Date: Sunday, January 2
- Location: Ralph Wilson Stadium, Orchard Park, New York
- Game start: 1:00 p.m. EST
- Game attendance: 73,414
- Game weather: 52° (cloudy)
- Referee: Terry McAulay
- TV announcers (CBS): Kevin Harlan and Randy Cross

With the win, the Steelers finished with a league-best 15–1 record.

=== Standings ===
==== Division ====
AFC North
	W	L	T	PCT	DIV	CONF	PF	PA	STK
^{(1)} Pittsburgh Steelers	15	1	0	.938	5–1	11–1	372	251	W14
Baltimore Ravens	9	7	0	.563	3–3	6–6	317	268	W1
Cincinnati Bengals	8	8	0	.500	2–4	4–8	374	372	W2
Cleveland Browns	4	12	0	.250	2–4	3–9	276	390	W1

==== Conference ====
AFC
#	Team	Division	W	L	T	PCT	DIV	CONF	SOS	SOV	STK
**Division leaders**
1	Pittsburgh Steelers	North	15	1	0	.938	5–1	11–1	.484	.479	W14
2	New England Patriots	East	14	2	0	.875	5–1	10–2	.492	.478	W2
3 (Note: Indianapolis clinched the AFC #3 seed instead of San Diego based upon head-to-head victory.)	Indianapolis Colts	South	12	4	0	.750	5–1	8–4	.500	.458	L1
4	San Diego Chargers	West	12	4	0	.750	5–1	9–3	.477	.411	W1
**Wild cards**
5 (Note: New York Jets clinched the AFC #5 seed instead of Denver based upon better record against common opponents (New York Jets were 5–0 to Denver’s 3–2 against San Diego, Cincinnati, Houston, and Miami).)	New York Jets	East	10	6	0	.625	3–3	7–5	.523	.406	L2
6	Denver Broncos	West	10	6	0	.625	3–3	7–5	.484	.450	W2
**Did not qualify for the postseason**
7 (Note: Jacksonville and Baltimore finished ahead of Buffalo because they each defeated Buffalo head-to-head.) (Note: Jacksonville finished ahead of Baltimore based upon better record against common opponents (Jacksonville were 3–2 against Baltimore’s 2–3 versus Pittsburgh, Indianapolis, Buffalo and Kansas City).)	Jacksonville Jaguars	South	9	7	0	.563	2–4	6–6	.527	.479	W1
8	Baltimore Ravens	North	9	7	0	.563	3–3	6–6	.551	.472	W1
9	Buffalo Bills	East	9	7	0	.563	3–3	5–7	.512	.382	L1
10	Cincinnati Bengals	North	8	8	0	.500	2–4	4–8	.543	.453	W2
11 (Note: Houston finished ahead of Kansas City based upon head-to-head victory.)	Houston Texans	South	7	9	0	.438	4–2	6–6	.504	.402	L1
12	Kansas City Chiefs	West	7	9	0	.438	3–3	6–6	.551	.509	L1
13 (Note: Oakland finished ahead of Tennessee based upon head-to-head victory.)	Oakland Raiders	West	5	11	0	.313	1–5	3–9	.570	.450	L2
14	Tennessee Titans	South	5	11	0	.313	1–5	3–9	.512	.463	W1
15 (Note: Miami finished ahead of Cleveland based upon head-to-head victory.)	Miami Dolphins	East	4	12	0	.250	1–5	2–10	.555	.438	L1
16	Cleveland Browns	North	4	12	0	.250	1–5	3–9	.590	.469	W1
**Tiebreakers** (Note: When breaking ties for three or more teams under the NFL's rules, they are first broken within divisions, then comparing only the highest-ranked remaining team from each division.)

== Playoffs ==
=== Schedule ===
Week	Date	Kickoff (ET)	TV	Opponent	Result	Game site	NFL recap
Divisional	January 15	4:30 p.m.	CBS	New York Jets	W 20–17 (OT)	Heinz Field	Summary
Conference	January 23	6:30 p.m.	CBS	New England Patriots	L 27–41	Heinz Field	Summary

=== Game summaries ===
==== AFC Divisional: vs. New York Jets ====
AFC Divisional playoff
New York Jets at Pittsburgh Steelers

Team	1	2	3	4	OT	Total
Jets	0	10	7	0	0	17
• Steelers	10	0	0	7	3	20

- Date: Saturday, January 15
- Location: Heinz Field, Pittsburgh, Pennsylvania
- Game start: 4:30 p.m. EST
- Game attendance: 64,915
- Game weather: 26 °F (−3 °C) (Clear)
- Referee: Bill Leavy
- TV announcers (CBS): Dick Enberg, Dan Dierdorf, and Armen Keteyian

After a brilliant 15–1 regular season the Steelers pulled one out of the fire in the divisional playoffs against the Jets. Ben Roethlisberger was intercepted at the Jets 14-yard line and Reggie Tongue ran back an 86-yard touchdown in the third quarter. After tying the game at 17 in the fourth the Steelers had to sweat out a Jets drive in the final minutes of regulation. The Jets set up for a Doug Brien 47-yard field goal but the kick missed, hitting the crossbar. On the ensuing possession, Roethlisberger was intercepted again and another Brien field goal was set up, this one from 43 yards away – but it again missed, sailing wide left. In overtime, the Jets won the kick-off but failed to score on their first possession. The Steelers, then, drove down field and Jeff Reed's 33-yard field goal ended a 20–17 Pittsburgh win.

==== AFC Championship: vs. New England Patriots ====
AFC Championship game
New England Patriots at Pittsburgh Steelers

Team	1	2	3	4	Total
• Patriots	10	14	7	10	41
Steelers	3	0	14	10	27

- Date: Sunday, January 23
- Location: Heinz Field, Pittsburgh, Pennsylvania
- Game start: 6:30 p.m. EST
- Game attendance: 65,242
- Game weather: 12 °F (−11 °C) (Clear)
- Referee: Walt Anderson
- TV announcers (CBS): Jim Nantz, Phil Simms, Bonnie Bernstein, and Armen Keteyian

Revenge for their Halloween loss drove the 14–2 Patriots back to Heinz Field and the conference championship. The shaky play of the Steelers against the Jets the week before was exploited by New England as Ben Roethlisberger was intercepted almost right away, then on their next possession the Steelers were stopped on downs. The Patriots raced to a 17–3 lead in the second quarter before Roethlisberger drove them down field and threw a back-breaking interception to Rodney Harrison at the Patriots 13-yard line; Harrison ran back the 87-yard touchdown and fans at Heinz began chanting for Tommy Maddox to come in to replace Roethlisberger. The Steelers managed a pair of third-quarter touchdowns (a 5-yard Jerome Bettis run and a 30-yard Roethlisberger pass to Hines Ward) but these only sandwiched another Patriots score (a 25-yard run by ex-Bengal Corey Dillon) and the Steelers simply could not overcome New England's offense as the Patriots finished off Pittsburgh 41–27, the third playoff win in four career tries by the Patriots over the Steelers.

The game is also significant as the final game by the team's radio broadcaster, Myron Cope. Cope had served as the color commentator on the team's radio broadcast for 35 years. He would publicly announce his retirement five months later.

== Honors and awards ==
- Ben Roethlisberger, AP NFL Offensive Rookie of the Year
- Ben Roethlisberger, Diet Pepsi NFL Rookie of the Year

=== Pro Bowl representatives ===
See: 2005 Pro Bowl

- No. 36 Jerome Bettis – running back (alternate)
- No. 43 Troy Polamalu – strong safety
- No. 51 James Farrior – inside linebacker
- No. 55 Joey Porter – outside linebacker
- No. 64 Jeff Hartings – center
- No. 66 Alan Faneca – offensive guard
- No. 77 Marvel Smith – offensive tackle (alternate)
- No. 86 Hines Ward – wide receiver
- No. 91 Aaron Smith – defensive end (alternate)
