= Dan Kreider =

American football player (born 1977)

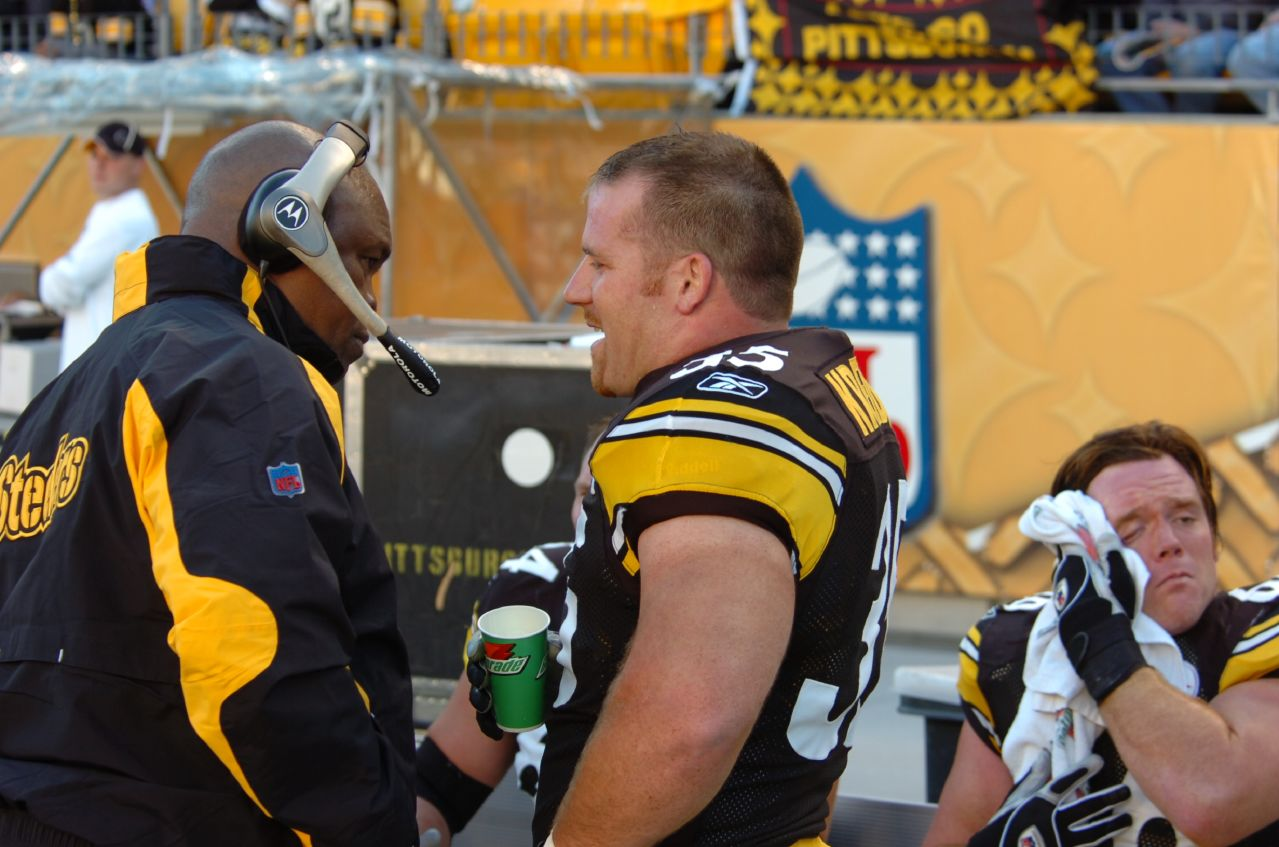
- Kreider (center) with a coach while with the Steelers in 2006.

No. 35, 36
- Position: Fullback

Personal information
- Born: March 11, 1977 (age 49); Lancaster, Pennsylvania, U.S.
- Listed height: 5 ft 11 in (1.80 m)
- Listed weight: 250 lb (113 kg)

Career information
- High school: Manheim Central (Manheim, Pennsylvania)
- College: New Hampshire
- NFL draft: 2000: undrafted

Career history
- Pittsburgh Steelers (2000–2007); St. Louis Rams (2008); Arizona Cardinals (2009)

Awards and highlights
- Super Bowl champion (XL)

Career NFL statistics
- Rushing attempts: 32
- Rushing yards: 144
- Rushing touchdowns: 2
- Receptions: 64
- Receiving yards: 491
- Receiving touchdowns: 2
- Stats at Pro Football Reference

Daniel S. Kreider (born March 11, 1977) is an American former professional football player who was a fullback in the National Football League (NFL). He played college football for the University of New Hampshire. He was signed by the Pittsburgh Steelers as an undrafted free agent in 2000.

Kreider earned a Super Bowl ring with the Steelers in Super Bowl XL, defeating the Seattle Seahawks. He has also played for the St. Louis Rams and the Arizona Cardinals.

== College career ==
Kreider earned state Section II Best Player honors as a senior at Manheim, Pennsylvania's Manheim Central High School. He attended the University of New Hampshire and was an A student and a letterman in football. In football, he was a three-year starter at fullback; as a senior, he posted 92 rushing attempts for 518 yards (5.6 yards per rushing attempt avg.), 25 receptions for 275 yards (11.00 yards per reception avg.) and a touchdown. He majored in business administration.

== Professional career ==
Pre-draft measurables
Height	Weight
5 ft 11 5/8 in (1.82 m)	255 lb (116 kg)
Values from New Hampshire's Pro Day

=== Pittsburgh Steelers ===
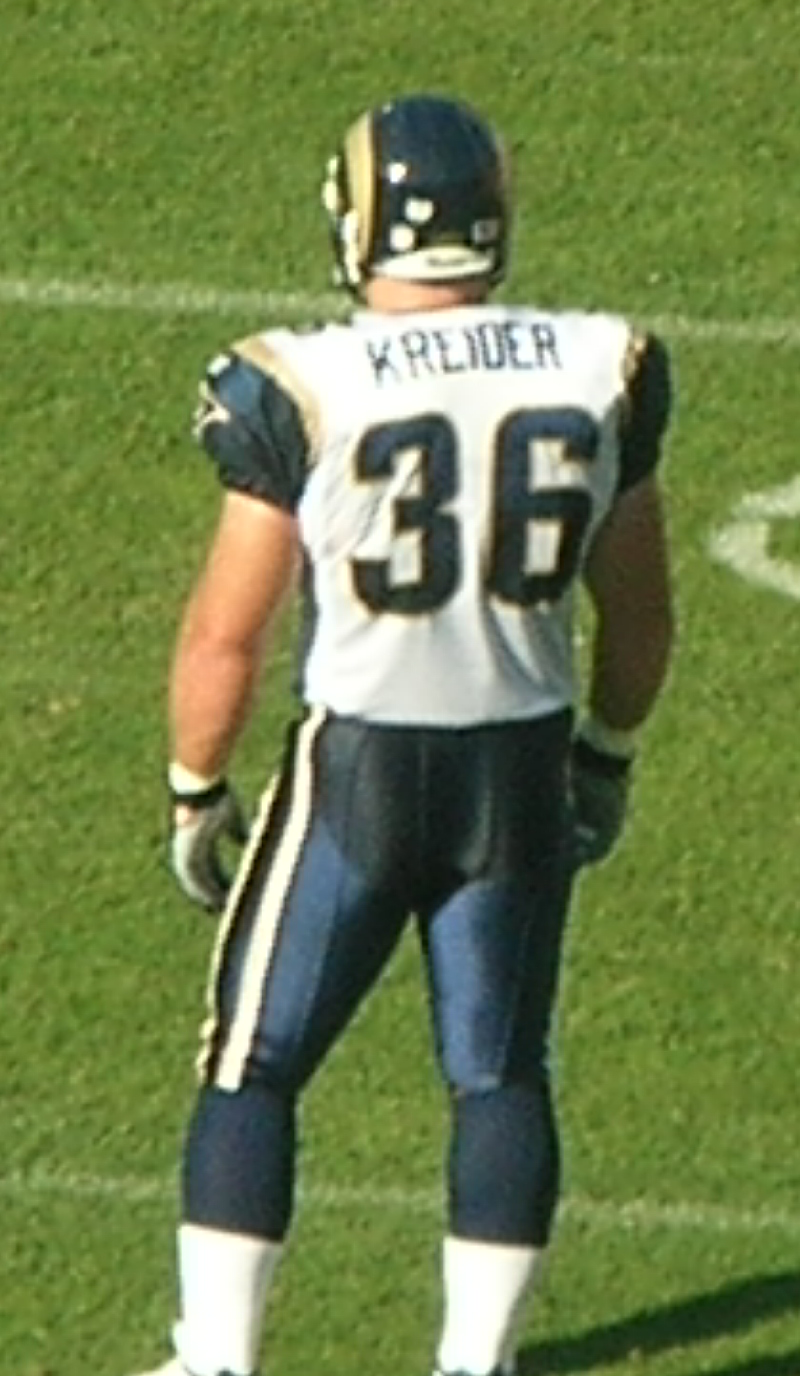
Kreider with the Rams in November 2008.

Kreider entered the league when the Steelers signed him as an undrafted free agent following the 2000 NFL draft. After playing on the team's practice squad, he was signed to the active roster on October 17, 2000, to replace Jon Witman, who had been injured.

He remained on the active roster for the remainder of the season and was named the Steelers' Rookie of the Year, playing better than draftees Plaxico Burress and Marvel Smith. Starting at fullback in Super Bowl XL vs Seattle, Kreider threw a key block for quarterback Ben Roethlisberger on a one-yard touchdown run in the second quarter to give the Steelers a 7–3 lead.

On September 7, 2007, it was announced that there may be some games during the 2007 season that Kreider may not even dress. It was also announced at the same time that he would not be the starting fullback, but rather Carey Davis would assume that role for at least the first game.

After tearing his ACL in week 12 against the Miami Dolphins, he was placed on season-ending injured reserve on November 29.

=== St. Louis Rams ===
On July 22, 2008, Kreider was signed by the St. Louis Rams but was released on November 23, 2008. Kreider was the Rams' starting fullback and played in all 11 games he was on the team for. He had one carry for zero yards.

Kreider wore 36 for the Rams, the same number Jerome Bettis wore when he played for the Rams. Bettis played his first three seasons with the Rams before being traded to the Steelers. Kreider had previously worn 35.

=== Arizona Cardinals ===
Kreider signed a one-year contract with the Arizona Cardinals on April 2, 2009. The move reunited him with Cardinals head coach Ken Whisenhunt, who had previously been the offensive coordinator for the Steelers during Kreider's time in Pittsburgh.

== NFL career statistics ==
Legend
**Bold**	Career high

=== Regular season ===
Year	Team	Games		Rushing					Receiving				
Year	Team	GP	GS	Att	Yds	Avg	Lng	TD	Rec	Yds	Avg	Lng	TD
2000	PIT	10	7	2	24	**12.0**	**22**	0	5	42	8.4	14	0
2001	PIT	13	1	**7**	**29**	4.1	12	**1**	2	5	2.5	5	0
2002	PIT	**16**	**13**	6	16	2.7	5	0	**18**	**122**	6.8	15	**1**
2003	PIT	**16**	12	**7**	**29**	4.1	9	**1**	9	107	11.9	**26**	0
2004	PIT	**16**	9	4	18	4.5	6	0	10	75	7.5	13	**1**
2005	PIT	**16**	8	3	21	7.0	12	0	7	43	6.1	9	0
2006	PIT	**16**	12	1	5	5.0	5	0	8	62	7.8	15	0
2007	PIT	10	4	1	2	5.0	2	0	1	15	**15.0**	15	0
2008	STL	11	4	1	0	0.0	0	0	0	0	0.0	0	0
2009	ARI	14	3	0	0	0.0	0	0	4	20	5.0	8	0
		138	73	32	144	4.5	22	2	64	491	7.7	26	2

=== Playoffs ===
Year	Team	Games		Rushing					Receiving				
Year	Team	GP	GS	Att	Yds	Avg	Lng	TD	Rec	Yds	Avg	Lng	TD
2001	PIT	2	0	0	0	0.0	0	0	**2**	13	6.5	**9**	0
2002	PIT	2	2	0	0	0.0	0	0	**2**	**14**	**7.0**	8	0
2004	PIT	2	2	0	0	0.0	0	0	0	0	0.0	0	0
2005	PIT	**4**	**4**	**1**	**2**	**2.0**	**2**	**1**	0	0	0.0	0	0
2009	ARI	2	0	0	0	0.0	0	0	0	0	0.0	0	0
		12	8	1	2	2.0	2	1	4	27	6.8	9	0
