= Travis Kirschke =

American football player (born 1974)

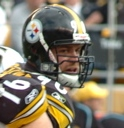

No. 67, 90
- Positions: Defensive tackle, defensive end

Personal information
- Born: September 6, 1974 (age 52); Fullerton, California, U.S.
- Listed height: 6 ft 3 in (1.91 m)
- Listed weight: 298 lb (135 kg)

Career information
- High school: Esperanza (Anaheim, California)
- College: UCLA
- NFL draft: 1997: undrafted

Career history
- Detroit Lions (1997–2002); San Francisco 49ers (2003); Pittsburgh Steelers (2004–2009)

Awards and highlights
- 2× Super Bowl champion (XL, XLIII)

Career NFL statistics
- Total tackles: 294
- Sacks: 13
- Fumble recoveries: 4
- Stats at Pro Football Reference

Travis Kirschke (born September 6, 1974) is an American former professional football player who was a defensive end in the National Football League (NFL). He played college football for the UCLA Bruins and was signed by the Detroit Lions as an undrafted free agent in 1997. Kirschke also played for the San Francisco 49ers and the Pittsburgh Steelers.

== Early life ==
Kirschke grew up in Yorba Linda, California, and attended Esperanza High School. He was named a California High School player of the year his Senior season and also won the Glenn Davis Award for the best high school player in the Los Angeles area.

== College career ==
Kirschke played college football for the UCLA Bruins where he made 104 tackles and 6.5 sacks.

== Professional career ==
=== Detroit Lions ===
Kirschke was selected by the Detroit Lions as an undrafted free agent in 1997. In his rookie season he played in three games making his NFL debut on August 31 against the Atlanta Falcons. He finished the season with one tackle. In 1998, he spent the majority of the season on the injured reserve list and did not get any playing time. The following year, he played a far more active role in the Lions starting line up with seven starts and 15 appearances. He finished the campaign with 20 tackles and two sacks. In 2000, he played in 13 games recording 13 tackles and 0.5 sacks. In 2001, his fifth season with the Lions, he played in all 16 games making 20 tackles. In his final year with the Lions he made 15 appearances and 19 tackles.

=== San Francisco 49ers ===
Kirschke signed for the San Francisco 49ers before the start of the 2003 season. In his only year for the franchise he started in 15 out of 16 games and recorded 43 tackles and 1.5 sacks.

=== Pittsburgh Steelers ===
Kirschke signed with the Pittsburgh Steelers as an unrestricted free agent on March 11, 2004. In his first season with the team he played in all 16 games and finished the season with 12 tackles and one sack. In 2005, he was part of the Steelers team who won Super Bowl XL and finished the year 13 tackles and one sack. The following year, he made eight tackles and equaled his career-high total of two sacks. In 2007, he finished the campaign with 26 tackles and two sacks. In 2008, as part of the NFL's best defense, Travis had a career-high 46 tackles and 2 sacks, 3 more tackles than he had as a starter for the 49ers.

== NFL career statistics ==
Legend
	Won the Super Bowl
**Bold**	Career high

=== Regular season ===
Year	Team	Games		Tackles				Interceptions				Fumbles			
Year	Team	GP	GS	Comb	Solo	Ast	Sck	Int	Yds	TD	Lng	FF	FR	Yds	TD
1997	DET	3	0	1	0	1	0.0	0	0	0	0	0	0	0	0
1999	DET	15	7	20	12	8	**2.0**	0	0	0	0	0	**1**	0	0
2000	DET	13	0	12	4	8	0.5	0	0	0	0	0	**1**	0	0
2001	DET	16	2	20	12	8	0.0	0	0	0	0	0	0	0	0
2002	DET	15	1	29	20	9	0.0	0	0	0	0	0	0	0	0
2003	SFO	15	15	43	**33**	10	1.5	0	0	0	0	0	0	0	0
2004	PIT	16	1	15	9	6	1.0	0	0	0	0	0	0	0	0
2005	PIT	16	0	20	11	9	1.0	0	0	0	0	0	**1**	0	0
2006	PIT	16	0	14	8	6	**2.0**	0	0	0	0	0	0	0	0
2007	PIT	16	4	**48**	30	**18**	**2.0**	0	0	0	0	0	0	0	0
2008	PIT	16	6	46	30	16	**2.0**	0	0	0	0	0	**1**	0	0
2009	PIT	12	7	26	16	10	1.0	0	0	0	0	0	0	0	0
		169	43	294	185	109	13.0	0	0	0	0	0	4	0	0

=== Playoffs ===
Year	Team	Games		Tackles				Interceptions				Fumbles			
Year	Team	GP	GS	Comb	Solo	Ast	Sck	Int	Yds	TD	Lng	FF	FR	Yds	TD
1997	DET	1	0	2	2	0	0.0	0	0	0	0	0	0	0	0
1999	DET	1	0	0	0	0	0.0	0	0	0	0	0	0	0	0
2004	PIT	2	0	3	1	**2**	0.0	0	0	0	0	0	0	0	0
2005	PIT	4	0	1	1	0	0.0	0	0	0	0	0	**1**	0	0
2007	PIT	1	1	**4**	**3**	1	0.0	0	0	0	0	0	0	0	0
2008	PIT	3	0	2	1	1	0.0	0	0	0	0	0	0	0	0
		12	1	12	8	4	0.0	0	0	0	0	0	1	0	0

== Personal life ==
Kirschke is married to Amy and has one daughter, Ella, who is a member of the UCLA swim team, and two sons, Gabe and Blake. Gabe is a member of the Wake Forest football team. Blake attends Denver and plays lacrosse. He is currently an assistant football coach at Valor Christian High School in Highlands Ranch, Colorado.
