= Chidi Iwuoma =

American football player (born 1978)

No. 40, 29, 28
- Position: Cornerback

Personal information
- Born: February 19, 1978 (age 48); Los Angeles, California, U.S.
- Listed height: 5 ft 9 in (1.75 m)
- Listed weight: 189 lb (86 kg)

Career information
- High school: Pasadena (Pasadena, California)
- College: California
- NFL draft: 2001: undrafted

Career history
- Detroit Lions (2001); Pittsburgh Steelers (2002–2005); New England Patriots (2006); St. Louis Rams (2006); Pittsburgh Steelers (2006); Tennessee Titans (2007)

Awards and highlights
- Super Bowl champion (XL)

Career NFL statistics
- Total tackles: 85
- Forced fumbles: 2
- Fumble recoveries: 1
- Pass deflections: 2
- Stats at Pro Football Reference

Chidi Francis Iwuoma (born February 19, 1978) is an American former professional football player who is a scout for BLESTO. He played as a a cornerback in the National Football League (NFL). Iwuoma played college football for the California Golden Bears before being signed by the Detroit Lions as an undrafted free agent in 2001.

Iwuoma has also played in the NFL for the Pittsburgh Steelers, New England Patriots, St. Louis Rams and Tennessee Titans. He won Super Bowl XL with the Steelers.

== Early life ==
Iwuoma's parents were Nigerian immigrants. Chidi Iwuoma attended Pasadena High School in Pasadena, California. He then attended the University of California, Berkeley, where he played football for the California Golden Bears, returning kicks and punts while also playing cornerback.

Chidi Iwuoma is a member of Iota Phi Theta fraternity.

== Professional career ==
=== Detroit Lions ===
Iwuoma signed with the Detroit Lions as an undrafted free agent following the 2001 NFL draft.

=== Pittsburgh Steelers ===
Iwuoma primarily played on special teams while with the Pittsburgh Steelers. He earned a Super Bowl ring with the Steelers following the 2005 season. Iwuoma was elected the special teams co-captain for two consecutive seasons. In 2006, he underwent shoulder surgery but returned in time for pre-season camp. During the pre-season he suffered a concussion and was released on September 6.

=== New England Patriots ===
Iwuoma signed with the New England Patriots on October 4, 2006. He was released on October 31.

=== St. Louis Rams ===
A few weeks after his release from the Patriots, Iwuoma signed with the St. Louis Rams on November 14. He was released again on November 28.

=== Return to Pittsburgh ===
On December 5, 2006, with four games remaining in the season, the Steelers re-signed Iwuoma. Iwuoma ended his 2006 season with the Steelers but dislocated his wrist. He was re-signed on March 16, 2007, as an unrestricted free agent. The Steelers waived Iwuoma as a final cut on September 2.

=== Tennessee Titans ===
He was signed by the Titans on December 26, 2007. He became an unrestricted free agent after the season.

== NFL career statistics ==
Legend
**Bold**	Career high

=== Regular season ===
Year	Team	Games		Tackles					Interceptions					Fumbles			
Year	Team	GP	GS	Cmb	Solo	Ast	Sck	TFL	Int	Yds	TD	Lng	PD	FF	FR	Yds	TD
2001	DET	13	**1**	12	11	1	0.0	0	0	0	0	0	**2**	0	0	0	0
2002	PIT	13	0	17	13	**4**	0.0	0	0	0	0	0	0	0	0	0	0
2003	PIT	15	0	14	11	3	0.0	0	0	0	0	0	0	0	**1**	0	0
2004	PIT	14	0	**21**	**17**	**4**	0.0	0	0	0	0	0	0	**1**	0	0	0
2005	PIT	**16**	0	15	12	3	0.0	0	0	0	0	0	0	**1**	0	0	0
2006	PIT	2	0	3	2	1	0.0	0	0	0	0	0	0	0	0	0	0
2006	NWE	3	0	1	1	0	0.0	0	0	0	0	0	0	0	0	0	0
2007	TEN	1	0	2	2	0	0.0	0	0	0	0	0	0	0	0	0	0
		77	1	85	69	16	0.0	0	0	0	0	0	2	2	1	0	0

=== Playoffs ===
Year	Team	Games		Tackles					Interceptions					Fumbles			
Year	Team	GP	GS	Cmb	Solo	Ast	Sck	TFL	Int	Yds	TD	Lng	PD	FF	FR	Yds	TD
2002	PIT	2	0	1	1	0	0.0	0	0	0	0	0	0	0	0	0	0
2004	PIT	1	0	0	0	0	0.0	0	0	0	0	0	0	0	0	0	0
2005	PIT	**4**	0	**5**	**3**	**2**	0.0	0	0	0	0	0	0	0	0	0	0
2007	TEN	1	0	0	0	0	0.0	0	0	0	0	0	0	0	0	0	0
		8	0	6	4	2	0.0	0	0	0	0	0	0	0	0	0	0

== After professional career ==
Iwuoma worked with the University of California's Athletic Study Center from 2009 to 2012, where he served as assistant director of Student-Athlete Development. In May 2013 he joined the Steelers as their designated BLESTO scout.
