= Clint Kriewaldt =

American football player (born 1976)

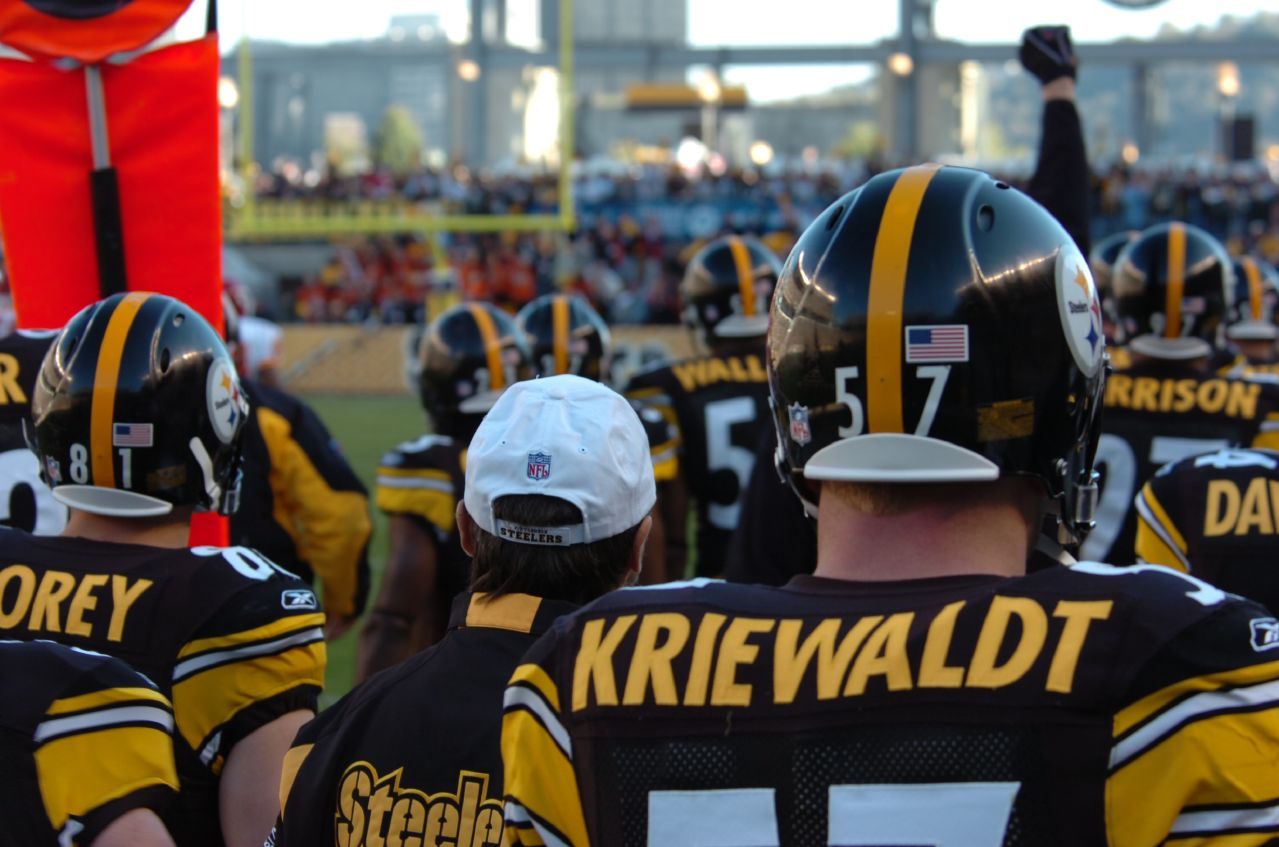
- Kriewaldt with the Pittsburgh Steelers prior to a game

No. 58, 57
- Position: Linebacker

Personal information
- Born: March 16, 1976 (age 50); Shiocton, Wisconsin, U.S.
- Listed height: 6 ft 1 in (1.85 m)
- Listed weight: 248 lb (112 kg)

Career information
- High school: Shiocton
- College: Wisconsin–Stevens Point
- NFL draft: 1999: 6th round, 177th overall pick

Career history
- Detroit Lions (1999–2002); Pittsburgh Steelers (2003–2007)

Awards and highlights
- Super Bowl champion (XL)

Career NFL statistics
- Total tackles: 183
- Sacks: 0.5
- Forced fumbles: 2
- Fumble recoveries: 2
- Interceptions: 2
- Stats at Pro Football Reference

Clint Kriewaldt (born March 16, 1976) is an American former professional football player who was a linebacker in the National Football League (NFL). He was selected by the Detroit Lions in the sixth round of the 1999 NFL draft. He played college football for the Wisconsin–Stevens Point Pointers.

== Professional career ==
His first four seasons in the NFL were spent with the Detroit Lions, where he spent most of his time as a backup and on special teams. He played for the Pittsburgh Steelers from 2003 to 2007.

He made the opening tackle in Super Bowl XL against the Seattle Seahawks. On February 22, 2008, the Steelers released him. Kriewaldt's career was reportedly in jeopardy due to an injury.

== In the media ==
Kriewaldt became a bit of a folk hero in his rookie season among listeners of WDFN in Detroit, despite (or likely due to) his third-string status. The staff recorded a parody of the Christmas standard "We Wish You a Merry Christmas", which went:

"We wish you a merry Kriewaldt, We wish you a merry Kriewaldt, We wish you a merry Kriewaldt..."

followed by Kriewaldt himself singing the line:

"And I hope that I play."

== Personal life ==
Kriewaldt was an All-State running back at Shiocton High School, earned All-Region and All-Conference honors as running back and linebacker as a prep senior in 1993, was the 1993 Offensive Player of the Year in Central Wisconsin Conference (large schools), earned Team MVP and team captain in 1993, and set school rushing records for most career yards (3,357), single-season yards (1,552) and single-game yards (317). He earned his college degree in the 2000 offseason. He served as the head coach for Freedom High School football team in Freedom, Wisconsin, where he lives from 2012 to 2016, He served as an assistant in the program from 2016 to 2020 and became the head coach again in 2021.

Kriewaldt is married. His son, Carter, currently plays wide receiver for North Dakota State.

Kriewaldt ran for Outagamie County sheriff in the primary election on August 14, 2018. His win was a landslide compared to the opposition. His opponents included Co-worker Deputy John Brylski, former Marine, and Alex Bebris.
