= Russell Stuvaints =

American football player (born 1980)

No. 33
- Position: Safety

Personal information
- Born: August 28, 1980 (age 46); Pittsburgh, Pennsylvania, U.S.
- Listed height: 6 ft 0 in (1.83 m)
- Listed weight: 210 lb (95 kg)

Career information
- High school: McKeesport Area (McKeesport, Pennsylvania)
- College: Youngstown State
- NFL draft: 2003: undrafted

Career history
- Pittsburgh Steelers (2003); New England Patriots (2004)*; Pittsburgh Steelers (2004–2005); Team Arkansas (2008)*; Burgh Defenders (2019)
- * Offseason or practice squad member only

Awards and highlights
- Super Bowl champion (XL)

Career NFL statistics
- Tackles: 40
- Passes defended: 4
- Fumble recoveries: 1
- Stats at Pro Football Reference

Russell Stuvaints Jr. (born August 28, 1980) is an American former professional football player who was a defensive back for the Pittsburgh Steelers of the National Football League (NFL). He played college football for the Youngstown State Penguins. Stuvaints won Super Bowl XL with the Steelers.

Although billed as a defensive back, Russell performed most notably on special teams throughout his NFL career.

== Early life ==
Stuvaints attended McKeesport Area High School in McKeesport, Pennsylvania, where he played football for the Tigers under the guidance of coach George Smith. He holds several school records at McKeesport.

== College career ==
Russell attended Youngstown State University and was a student and a letterman in football. In football, as a junior, he was a second-team All-Gateway Football Conference selection and an Honorable Mention All-America selection. As a senior, he was an All-Gateway Conference Honorable Mention selection.

== Professional career ==
=== Pittsburgh Steelers (first stint) ===
Stuvaints signed with the Pittsburgh Steelers on May 2, 2003, after going undrafted in the 2003 NFL draft. He was waived on August 26, signed to the practice squad on September 2, released on September 30, re-signed to the practice squad on October 7, released on October 21, and re-signed to the practice squad again on October 28. He was then promoted to the active roster for the first time on December 3 and played in four games for the Steelers during the 2003 season, recording one assisted tackle.

He was waived by the Steelers on September 5, 2004.

=== New England Patriots ===
Stuvaints was signed to the practice squad of the New England Patriots on September 7, 2004.

=== Pittsburgh Steelers (second stint) ===
On September 13, 2004, the Steelers signed Stuvaints off of the Patriots' practice squad. He appeared in 15 games for the Steelers in 2004, totaling 29 solo tackles, eight assisted tackles, four pass breakups and one fumble recovery that was returned 24 yards for a touchdown. He also played in two playoff games, recording three solo tackles.

He was waived by the Steelers on September 3, 2005, but later re-signed on October 24. He played in four games in 2005, recording two solo tackles, before being placed on injured reserve on November 22, 2005, due to a knee injury. The Steelers won Super Bowl XL that season.

=== AAFL ===
Stuvaints later signed with the All American Football League to play for Team Arkansas.

=== Burgh Defenders ===
Stuvaints signed with the Burgh Defenders of the American Arena League for the 2019 season.

== Personal life ==
On July 10, 2009, it was reported that Stuvaints would be trying out for the Pittsburgh Phantoms of the Global Professional Basketball League on July 12, 2009.

=== Shooting ===
On June 1, 2008, Stuvaints was injured during an altercation at Nigro's Restaurant in North Versailles, Pennsylvania. Stuvaints, who was shot once in the right hip, was one of five people wounded during the incident. The next day, police arrested Tyrone Watson, a 27-year-old from McKeesport, and charged him with five counts of aggravated assault, five counts of reckless endangerment, and one count of carrying an unlicensed firearm. Stuvaints attended the preliminary hearing and told the judges that Watson was not the shooter nor was he present in Nigro's. The Judge finally listened to all 5 people that were shot all testified that Watson was not the shooter. Watson was also found not guilty of the shooting, it was also found that he was not even present in the bar at the time.

=== Arrests ===
In 2016, Stuvaints was arrested in White Oak, Pennsylvania, on drug charges and weapons violations, according to police. He also pleaded guilty in 2013 to charges of aggravated assault and resisting arrest, a year after police said they had to use a Taser to subdue Stuvaints after he threatened a woman in McKeesport. He allegedly punched one officer in the face before he was subdued, according to the Tribune-Review.
