= Mike Schneck =

American football player (born 1977)

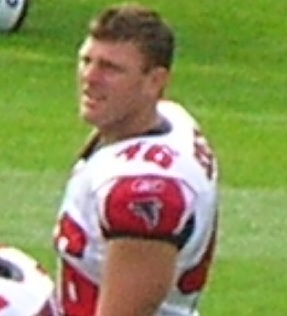
- Schneck with the Atlanta Falcons in 2008

No. 54, 46
- Position: Long snapper

Personal information
- Born: August 4, 1977 (age 49); Whitefish Bay, Wisconsin, U.S.
- Listed height: 6 ft 1 in (1.85 m)
- Listed weight: 234 lb (106 kg)

Career information
- High school: Whitefish Bay
- College: Wisconsin
- NFL draft: 1999: undrafted

Career history
- Pittsburgh Steelers (1999–2004); Buffalo Bills (2005–2006); Atlanta Falcons (2007–2009)

Awards and highlights
- Pro Bowl (2005)

Career NFL statistics
- Games played: 159
- Total tackles: 20
- Stats at Pro Football Reference

Michael Louis Schneck (born August 4, 1977) is an American former professional football player who was a long snapper for 11 seasons in the National Football League (NFL). He played college football for the Wisconsin Badgers. He was signed by the Pittsburgh Steelers as an undrafted free agent in 1999, and also played for the Buffalo Bills and Atlanta Falcons.

== Early life and education ==
Schneck attended Whitefish Bay High School, where in addition to handling longsnapping duties, he was a two-time All-League linebacker and the team captain and the Team MVP as a senior.

Schneck was a long snapper for the Wisconsin Badgers football team. He earned a business degree at the University of Wisconsin.

== Professional career ==
=== Pittsburgh Steelers ===
Beginning in 1999, Schneck spent the first six years of his career as the Steelers' long snapper.

=== Buffalo Bills ===
He was signed as a free agent by the Bills in 2005. Schneck was selected to his first Pro Bowl in 2005, alongside teammate Brian Moorman. He was released by the Bills during final cuts on September 1, 2007.

=== Atlanta Falcons ===
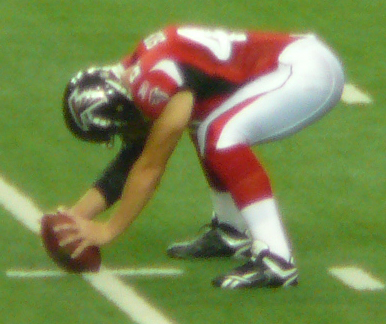
Schneck in 2009

On October 2, 2007, he signed with the Falcons. Schneck announced his retirement from the NFL on March 4, 2010.

== Personal ==
Married to Amanda, and the two have a first born, Joseph, second, Kylie, and third, Sam. They also have two dogs named Mocha and Twinkie.
