= Marvel Smith =

American football player (born 1978)

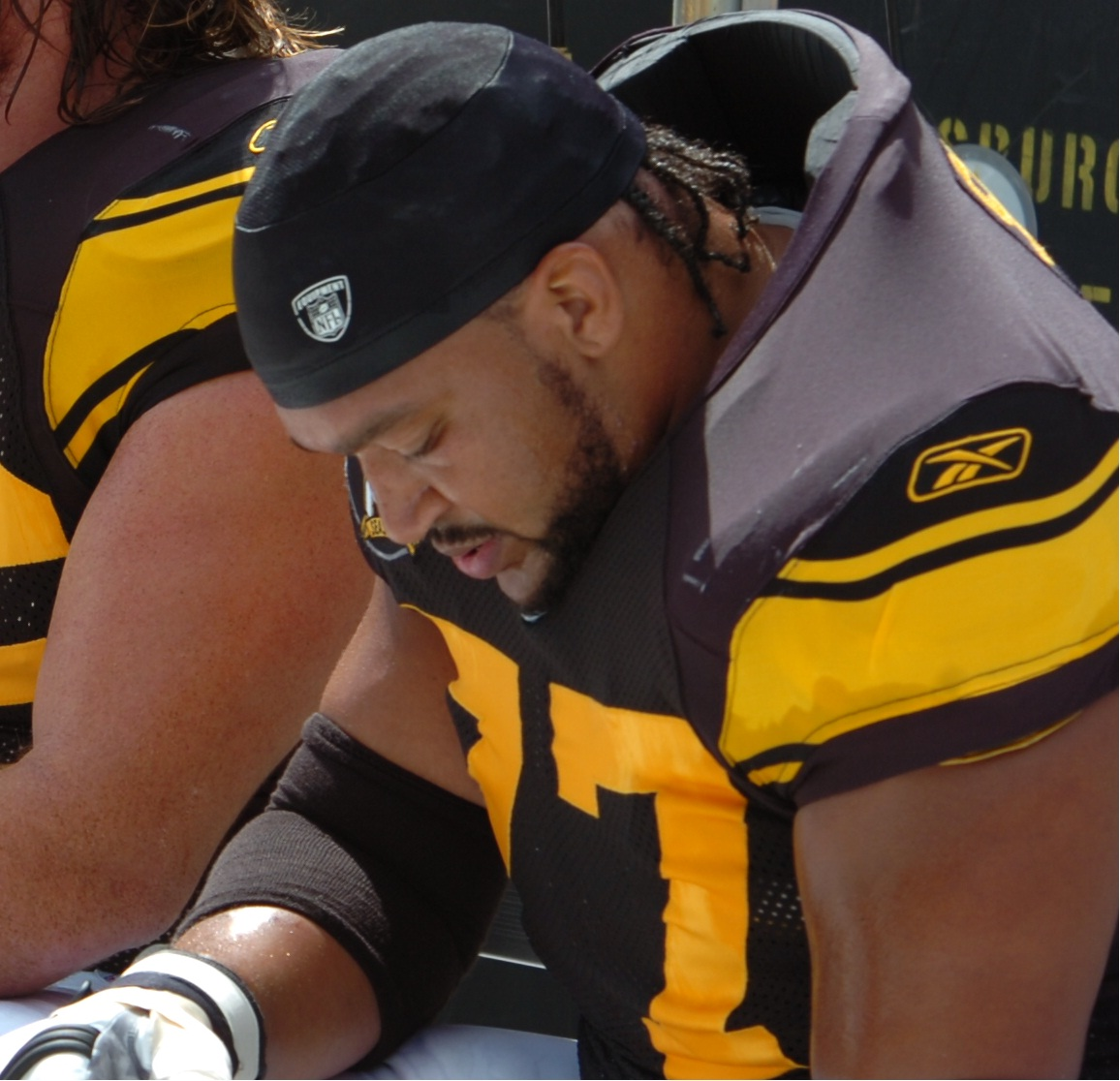
- Smith with the Pittsburgh Steelers in 2007

No. 77
- Position: Offensive tackle

Personal information
- Born: August 6, 1978 (age 48); Oakland, California, U.S.
- Listed height: 6 ft 5 in (1.96 m)
- Listed weight: 321 lb (146 kg)

Career information
- High school: Oakland (CA) Skyline
- College: Arizona State
- NFL draft: 2000: 2nd round, 38th overall pick

Career history
- Pittsburgh Steelers (2000–2008); San Francisco 49ers (2009)*
- * Offseason or practice squad member only

Awards and highlights
- 2× Super Bowl champion (XL, XLIII); Pro Bowl (2004); First-team All-American (1999); First-team All-Pac-10 (1999)

Career NFL statistics
- Games played: 111
- Games started: 108
- Fumble recoveries: 1
- Stats at Pro Football Reference

Marvel Amos Smith (born August 6, 1978) is an American former professional football player who was an offensive tackle for nine seasons in the National Football League (NFL). He played college football for the Arizona State Sun Devils. He was selected by the Pittsburgh Steelers in the second round of the 2000 NFL draft, and also was a member of the San Francisco 49ers. A one-time Pro Bowl selection, Smith earned two Super Bowl rings with the Steelers.

== Early life ==
Smith attended Skyline High School in Oakland, California, and was a top student and a letterman in football. In football, he was a two-time All-City selection.

== College career ==
Smith attended Arizona State University, where he was an All-American first-team selection in 1999, having only allowed one sack all season. He earned a bachelor's degree in interdisciplinary studies.

== Professional career ==
=== Pittsburgh Steelers ===
Smith was selected by the Pittsburgh Steelers in the second round (38th overall) in the 2000 NFL draft. He was selected to represent the AFC in the 2005 Pro Bowl for the first time after winning Super Bowl XL. Smith was considered by many to be one of the most important players on the Steelers' offensive line. Unfortunately, back injuries hampered him at the end of 2007 and limited him to a handful of games in 2008. The Steelers chose not to re-sign him after his 2003, 6-year, $26 million contract lapsed in the 2009 offseason.

=== San Francisco 49ers ===
An unrestricted free agent after the 2008 season, Smith agreed to terms with the San Francisco 49ers on March 27, 2009. The deal contained a maximum value of $10.5 million. Smith announced his retirement on August 28.
