= Destry Rides Again (disambiguation) =

Destry Rides Again is a 1939 western film starring James Stewart.

Destry Rides Again may also refer to:

- Destry Rides Again (1932 film), starring Tom Mix
- Destry Rides Again (Randy Weston album)
- Destry Rides Again (Roland Hanna album)
- Destry Rides Again (musical), by Harold Rome and Leonard Gershe
- Destry Rides Again (novel), by Max Brand

== See also ==
- Destry (disambiguation)
