= Destry =

Destry may refer to:

- Destry, Moselle, a French commune
- Destry Wright (born 1977), retired American football player
- Destry (band), an indie folk band
- Destry (film), a 1954 western starring Audie Murphy
- Destry (TV series), a 1964 western series starring John Gavin

== See also ==
- Destry Rides Again (disambiguation)
