= 2000 Pittsburgh Steelers season =

NFL team season

- Owner: The Rooney Family
- General manager: Kevin Colbert
- Head coach: Bill Cowher
- Offensive coordinator: Kevin Gilbride
- Defensive coordinator: Tim Lewis
- Home stadium: Three Rivers Stadium

Results
- Record: 9–7
- Division place: 3rd AFC Central
- Playoffs: Did not qualify
- All-Pros: None
- Pro Bowlers: OLB Jason Gildon
- Team MVP: Jerome Bettis
- Team ROY: Dan Kreider

The 2000 Pittsburgh Steelers season was the franchise's 68th season as a professional sports franchise and as a member of the National Football League (NFL).

The season began with the team trying to improve on their 6–10 record from 1999 in which they failed to qualify for the playoffs. While Pittsburgh did improve to 9–7 and had their first winning season since 1997, it was not enough for the team to qualify for the playoffs. This season also marked the Steelers' last at Three Rivers Stadium.

Coach Bill Cowher named Kent Graham the team's starting quarterback for the season over former starter Kordell Stewart. After a 0–3 start, Graham was injured and Stewart reclaimed the starting job. Graham was released at the end of the season.

== Offseason ==
Additions	Subtractions
G Rich Tylski (Jaguars)	DT Orpheus Roye (Browns)
QB Kent Graham (Giants)	S Chris Oldham (Saints)
S Myron Bell (Bengals)	G Brendan Stai (Jaguars)
DE Chris Sullivan (Patriots)	LB Carlos Emmons (Eagles)
DT Kimo von Oelhoffen (Bengals)	DE Nolan Harrison (Redskins)
	QB Mike Tomczak (Lions)

=== NFL draft ===
2000 Pittsburgh Steelers draft
Round	Pick	Player	Position	College	Notes
1	8	Plaxico Burress	Wide receiver	Michigan State	
2	38	Marvel Smith *	Offensive tackle	Arizona State	
3	72	Kendrick Clancy	Defensive tackle	Mississippi	
3	77	Hank Poteat	Cornerback	Pittsburgh	From Oakland
4	103	Danny Farmer	Wide receiver	UCLA	
5	137	Clark Haggans	Outside linebacker	Colorado State	
5	163	Tee Martin	Quarterback	Tennessee	Compensatory pick
6	173	Chris Combs	Defensive end	Duke	
6	204	Jason Gavadza	Tight end	Kent State	Compensatory pick
Made roster * Made at least one Pro Bowl during career

=== Undrafted free agents ===
2000 undrafted free agents of note
Player	Position	College
Kyle Atteberry	Kicker	Baylor
Ainsley Battles	Safety	Vanderbilt
Demetrius Brown	Wide receiver	Wisconsin
Sedrick Curry	Cornerback	Texas A&M
Jonathan Foster	Linebacker	Louisiana–Monroe
Hank Fraley	Guard	Robert Morris
Joey Goodspeed	Fullback	Notre Dame
Dan Kreider	Fullback	New Hampshire
Donnel Thompson	Linebacker	Wisconsin

== Personnel ==
2000 Pittsburgh Steelers staff
Front office: President – Daniel M. Rooney; Vice president and general counsel – Arthur J. Rooney II; Vice president – John R. McGinley; Vice president – Arthur J. Rooney, Jr.; Administration advisor – Chuck Noll; Director of business – Mark Hart; Business accounting coordinator – Jim Ellenberger; Office/ticket coordinator – Geraldine Glenn; Accounting manager – Jodie Spagnolli; Communications coordinator – Ron Wahl; Public relations/media manager – David Lockett; Website/network administrator – Kim Smith; Director of marketing – Tony Quatrini; Merchandising manager – Tim Carey; Client services administrator – Amy Cotropia; Marketing manager – Lynne Molyneaux; Luxury suite manager – Lisa Weinzetl; Marketing assistant – John Simpson; Marketing assistant – John Wodarek; Ticket manager – Brian Bonifate; Stadium project manager – Heidi Edwards; Football Operations; Director of football operations – Kevin Colbert; College scouting coordinator – Bill Baker; Pro scouting coordinator – Doug Whaley; Pro/college scout – Phil Kreidler; College scout – Mark Gorscak; College scout – Bob Lane; College scout – Bruce McNorton; College scout – Dan Rooney; College scout – Bill Nunn; BLESTO Scout – Kelvin Fisher; Head coaches: Head coach – Bill Cowher; Offensive coaches: Offensive coordinator – Kevin Gilbride; Running backs – Dick Hoak; Wide receivers – Bob Bratkowski; Tight ends – Mike Mularkey; Offensive line – Kent Stephenson; Offensive line assistant – Irv Eatman	Defensive coaches: Defensive coordinator – Tim Lewis; Defensive line – John Mitchell; Linebackers – Mike Archer; Defensive backs – Willy Robinson; Special teams coaches: Special teams – Jay Hayes; Administrative assistant – Lou Spanos; Administrative assistant – Mike Miller; Strength and conditioning: Conditioning coordinator – Chet Fuhrman; Medical Staff; Ophthalmologist – Dr. Randy Beatty; Physician, orthopedic – Dr. James P. Bradley; Neurological surgeon – Dr. Joseph Maroon; Physician, M.D. – Dr. Richard Rydze; Physician, consultant – Dr. Abraham J. Twerski; Physician, M.D. – Dr. Anthony P. Yates; Training Staff; Head athletic trainer – John Norwig; Assistant athletic trainer – Ryan Grove; Football Staff; Player development coordinator – Anthony Griggs; Equipment manager - Rodgers Freyvogel; Field manager – Rich Baker; Field/equipment assistant – Paul Gallagher; Video coordinator – Bob McCartney; Video assistant – Andy Lizanich; Video assistant – Rob Brakel; Photographers – Mike Fabus

== Roster ==
Notable additions include Plaxico Burress, Dan Kreider, Marvel Smith and Clark Haggans.

2000 Pittsburgh Steelers roster
Quarterbacks (QB): 11 Kent Graham; 17 Tee Martin; 10 Kordell Stewart; Running backs (RB): 36 Jerome Bettis; 33 Richard Huntley; 35 Dan Kreider FB; 21 Amos Zereoué; Wide receivers (WR): 89 Will Blackwell; 81 Troy Edwards; 88 Courtney Hawkins; 83 Kamil Loud; 82 Bobby Shaw; 86 Hines Ward; Tight ends (TE): 87 Mark Bruener; 48 Matt Cushing; 84 Jerame Tuman	Offensive linemen (OL): 63 Dermontti Dawson C; 62 Roger Duffy C; 66 Alan Faneca G; 72 Wayne Gandy T; 61 Tom Myslinski G; 68 Shar Pourdanesh T; 60 Oliver Ross G/T; 77 Marvel Smith T; 71 Larry Tharpe T; 66 Rich Tylski G; Defensive linemen (DL): 96 Kendrick Clancy NT; 73 Chris Combs DE; 76 Kevin Henry DE; 91 Aaron Smith DE; 74 Chris Sullivan DE; 67 Kimo von Oelhoffen NT	Linebackers (LB): 57 John Fiala ILB; 92 Jason Gildon OLB; 53 Clark Haggans OLB; 50 Earl Holmes ILB; 99 Levon Kirkland ILB; 55 Joey Porter OLB; 90 Donnel Thompson ILB; 56 Mike Vrabel OLB; Defensive backs (DB): 27 Brent Alexander FS; 28 Ainsley Battles SS; 42 Myron Bell SS; 24 Nakia Codie FS; 41 Lethon Flowers SS; 22 Hank Poteat CB; 30 Chad Scott CB; 23 Jason Simmons CB; 26 Deshea Townsend CB; 20 Dewayne Washington CB; Special teams (ST): 3 Kris Brown K; 4 Josh Miller P; 54 Mike Schneck LS	Practice squad: 19 Demetrius Brown WR; 40 Joey Goodspeed FB; 29 Pepe Pearson RB; 43 Payton Williams CB; Reserve: 80 Plaxico Burress WR (IR); 45 Chris Fuamatu-Maʻafala RB (IR); 85 Cory Geason TE (IR); 47 Scott Shields S (IR); 94 Jeremy Staat DE (IR); 38 Jon Witman FB (IR); 34 Destry Wright RB (IR); Rookies in italics 53 active, 7 reserve, 4 practice squad

== Preseason ==
=== Schedule ===
Week	Date	Opponent	Result	Record	Venue
1	July 30	at Dallas Cowboys	W 38–10	1–0	Texas Stadium
2	August 5	Miami Dolphins	W 13–10	2–0	Three Rivers Stadium
3	August 10	Carolina Panthers	W 13–0	3–0	Three Rivers Stadium
4	August 19	vs. Indianapolis Colts	L 23–24	3–1	Estadio Azteca (Mexico City)
5	August 25	at Washington Redskins	L 10–17	3–2	FedExField

== Regular season ==
=== Schedule ===
Week	Date	Opponent	Result	Record	Venue
1	September 3	**Baltimore Ravens**	**L** 0–16	0–1	Three Rivers Stadium
2	Bye				
3	September 17	at **Cleveland Browns**	**L** 20–23	0–2	Cleveland Browns Stadium
4	September 24	**Tennessee Titans**	**L** 20–23	0–3	Three Rivers Stadium
5	October 1	at **Jacksonville Jaguars**	**W** 24–13	1–3	Alltel Stadium
6	October 8	at New York Jets	**W** 20–3	2–3	Giants Stadium
7	October 15	**Cincinnati Bengals**	**W** 15–0	3–3	Three Rivers Stadium
8	October 22	**Cleveland Browns**	**W** 22–0	4–3	Three Rivers Stadium
9	October 29	at **Baltimore Ravens**	**W** 9–6	5–3	PSInet Stadium
10	November 5	at **Tennessee Titans**	**L** 7–9	5–4	Adelphia Coliseum
11	November 12	Philadelphia Eagles	**L** 23–26 (OT)	5–5	Three Rivers Stadium
12	November 19	**Jacksonville Jaguars**	**L** 24–34	5–6	Three Rivers Stadium
13	November 26	at **Cincinnati Bengals**	**W** 48–28	6–6	Paul Brown Stadium
14	December 3	Oakland Raiders	**W** 21–20	7–6	Three Rivers Stadium
15	December 10	at New York Giants	**L** 10–30	7–7	Giants Stadium
16	December 16	Washington Redskins	**W** 24–3	8–7	Three Rivers Stadium
17	December 24	at San Diego Chargers	**W** 34–21	9–7	Qualcomm Stadium
Note: Intra-division opponents are in **bold** text.

=== Game summaries ===
==== Week 1 (Sunday September 3, 2000): vs. Baltimore Ravens ====
	1	2	3	4	Total
**Ravens**	10	3	3	0	**16**
Steelers	0	0	0	0	**0**

at Three Rivers Stadium, Pittsburgh, Pennsylvania

- Game time: 1:00 p.m. EDT
- Game weather: 77 °F (25 °C) (Mostly Sunny)
- Game attendance: 55,049
- Referee: Phil Luckett
- TV announcers: (CBS) Don Criqui (play by play), Steve Tasker (color commentator)

==== Week 2 (Sunday September 10, 2000): Bye Week ====
The Steelers had a record of 0-1 on their bye week.

==== Week 3 (Sunday September 17, 2000): at Cleveland Browns ====
	1	2	3	4	Total
Steelers	0	10	10	0	**20**
**Browns**	14	0	3	6	**23**

at Cleveland Browns Stadium, Cleveland, Ohio

- Game time: 1:00 p.m. EDT
- Game weather:
- Game attendance: 73,018
- Referee: Bob McElwee
- TV announcers: (CBS) Gus Johnson (play by play), Brent Jones (color commentator)

The low point for the Steelers's season was probably their Week 3 loss to the Browns. Against a team that would eventually finish 3–13, the usually stout Steelers defense allowed Tim Couch to throw for over 300 yards while failing to sack him once. Furthermore, the game ended with probably the Steelers's biggest gaffe of the season.

The Browns's woeful offense drove down for touchdowns on each of their first two possessions, giving them an early 14–0 lead. A four-yard touchdown run by Richard Huntley helped the Steelers to narrow the deficit to 14–10 at the half, and Jerome Bettis's 10 yard touchdown run in the third quarter gave the Steelers a 20–17 lead. However, a Phil Dawson field goal tied it at 20, and a 79 yard pass from Couch to Kevin Johnson set up a 19-yard chip shot by Dawson to give the Browns a 23–20 lead with 2:48 to go. With the Steelers needing at least a field goal to force overtime, Kent Graham found Bobby Shaw for a 28-yard completion, then a 20-yard run by Chris Fuamatu-Ma'afala put the Steelers inside the 10-yard line when they called their final timeout with 30 seconds left. The Steelers decided to go for the win, and Graham spiked the ball before making the worst play of the day. On third and goal from the six-yard line, Graham dropped back with the Browns pass rush closing in. Rather than throwing incomplete to stop the clock, however, Graham allowed rookie DE Courtney Brown to sack him, meaning that the Steelers had no way to stop the clock without running another play. In the ensuing chaos, the Steelers sent out kicker Kris Brown to attempt a game-tying field goal (with Graham as the holder since he was already on the field), and they failed to get their formation set before time ran out, resulting in a loss.

==== Week 4 (Sunday September 24, 2000): vs. Tennessee Titans ====
	1	2	3	4	Total
**Titans**	10	0	3	10	**23**
Steelers	3	3	0	14	**20**

at Three Rivers Stadium, Pittsburgh, Pennsylvania

- Game time: 1:00 p.m. EDT
- Game weather: 60 °F (16 °C) (Cloudy)
- Game attendance: 51,769
- Referee: Walt Coleman
- TV announcers: (CBS) Ian Eagle (play by play), Mark May (color commentator)

After their humiliating loss to the Browns, the Steelers were in a must-win situation upon returning home to face the Titans. With Steve McNair suffering a bruised sternum in the Titans's previous game, it would be former Steelers QB Neil O'Donnell getting the start against his former team.

While the defense harassed O'Donnell, who completed less than half his passes (13-27) with three interceptions, the Steelers trailed for much of the game with the team down 13-6 late in the third. However, Kent Graham completed a 17-yard pass to Hines Ward, who went down just before the goal line. On the first play of the fourth quarter, Kordell Stewart subbed in for Graham and jumped over the Titans line for the game-tying touchdown. A five-yard touchdown run by Jerome Bettis made it 20-16 Steelers late. With three minutes to go, Jason Gildon sacked O'Donnell, knocking him out of the game. With O'Donnell hurt, Steve McNair, who dressed for the game but was not expected to play with a bruised sternum, came in despite his injury. All McNair did was drive the Titans down the field in four plays, hitting Erron Kinney for the go-ahead touchdown with 1:31 to go. On the next play from scrimmage, Graham was hit after completing a 20 yard pass to Chris Fuamatu-Ma'afala and also had to leave the game due to injury, forcing Kordell Stewart to take over at QB. Although Stewart only went 1–4 on the drive, he did manage to put the Steelers in field goal range with a 16 yard run. However, kicker Kris Brown's potential game-tying 50-yard field goal was short.

==== Week 5 (Sunday October 1, 2000): at Jacksonville Jaguars ====
	1	2	3	4	Total
**Steelers**	7	10	7	0	**24**
Jaguars	3	3	0	7	**13**

at Alltel Stadium, Jacksonville, Florida

- Game time: 1:00 p.m. EDT
- Game weather:
- Game attendance: 64,351
- Referee: Jeff Triplette
- TV announcers: (CBS) Kevin Harlan (play by play), Randy Cross (color commentator), Beasley Reece (sideline reporter)

Steelers get first ever win in Jacksonville.

With Kent Graham out with an injury, Kordell Stewart received his first start of the season coming off losing his starting job after two much-maligned seasons. However, to the pleasant surprise of the team and the fans, Stewart demonstrated his form of old, completing 10 of 16 passes (albeit for only 132 yards, no touchdowns, and one interception) and running for 61 more. Jerome Bettis added 97 yards rushing with 2 touchdowns, and the Steelers jumped out to a 24-6 lead.

During the game, rookie WR Plaxico Burress caught a third down pass and went down without being touched. He spiked the football to celebrate (confusing NCAA rules with NFL rules), but since he was never touched down, the ball remained live (in play) and the Jaguars recovered the fumble with linebacker Danny Clark returning the ball 44 yards to the Steelers' 27 yard line. In spite of this miscue being one of the worst plays of the NFL season, the Steelers even survived this setback without further damage; on 4th and 3 inside the 10, Jaguars coach Tom Coughlin elected to go for it with his team down 18, and Earl Holmes upended Jaguars quarterback Mark Brunell, leaving him a yard short of a first down.

==== Week 6 (Sunday October 8, 2000): at New York Jets ====
	1	2	3	4	Total
**Steelers**	3	7	0	10	**20**
Jets	0	3	0	0	**3**

at Giants Stadium, East Rutherford, New Jersey

- Game time: 1:00 p.m. EDT
- Game weather:
- Game attendance: 78,441
- Referee: Gerald Austin
- TV announcers: (CBS) Ian Eagle (play by play), Mark May (color commentator)

==== Week 7 (Sunday October 15, 2000): vs. Cincinnati Bengals ====
	1	2	3	4	Total
Bengals	0	0	0	0	**0**
**Steelers**	7	3	3	2	**15**

at Three Rivers Stadium, Pittsburgh, Pennsylvania

- Game time: 1:00 p.m. EDT
- Game weather: 59 °F (15 °C) (Cloudy)
- Game attendance: 54,238
- Referee: Phil Luckett
- TV announcers: (CBS) Don Criqui (play by play), Steve Tasker (color commentator)

==== Week 8 (Sunday October 22, 2000): vs. Cleveland Browns ====
	1	2	3	4	Total
Browns	0	0	0	0	**0**
**Steelers**	3	10	3	6	**22**

at Three Rivers Stadium, Pittsburgh, Pennsylvania

- Game time: 4:05 p.m. EDT
- Game weather: 70 °F (21 °C) (Sunny)
- Game attendance: 57,659
- Referee: Ed Hochuli
- TV announcers: (CBS) Ian Eagle (play by play), Mark May (color commentator)

==== Week 9 (Sunday October 29, 2000): at Baltimore Ravens ====
	1	2	3	4	Total
**Steelers**	0	0	9	0	**9**
Ravens	0	6	0	0	**6**

at PSINet Stadium, Baltimore, Maryland

- Game time: 1:00 p.m. EST
- Game weather:
- Game attendance: 69,405
- Referee: Bernie Kukar
- TV announcers: (CBS) Ian Eagle (play by play), Mark May (color commentator)

==== Week 10 (Sunday November 5, 2000): at Tennessee Titans ====
	1	2	3	4	Total
Steelers	0	0	0	7	**7**
**Titans**	0	3	0	6	**9**

at Adelphia Coliseum, Nashville, Tennessee

- Game time: 1:00 p.m. EST
- Game weather:
- Game attendance: 68,498
- Referee: Ron Blum
- TV announcers: (CBS) Gus Johnson (play by play), Brent Jones (color commentator), Marcus Allen (sideline reporter)

==== Week 11 (Sunday November 12, 2000): vs. Philadelphia Eagles ====
	1	2	3	4	OT	Total
**Eagles**	3	7	3	10	3	**26**
Steelers	0	6	7	10	0	**23**

at Three Rivers Stadium, Pittsburgh, Pennsylvania

- Game time: 1:00 p.m. EST
- Game weather: 42 °F (6 °C) (Cloudy)
- Game attendance: 56,702
- Referee: Dick Hantak
- TV announcers: (FOX) Kenny Albert (play by play), Tim Green (color commentator)

==== Week 12 (Sunday November 19, 2000): vs. Jacksonville Jaguars ====
	1	2	3	4	Total
**Jaguars**	0	17	17	0	**34**
Steelers	7	3	0	14	**24**

at Three Rivers Stadium, Pittsburgh, Pennsylvania

- Game time: 8:30 p.m. EST
- Game weather: 29 °F (−2 °C) (Clear)
- Game attendance: 50,925
- Referee: Gerald Austin
- TV announcers: (ESPN) Mike Patrick (play by play), Joe Theismann & Paul Maguire (color commentators), Solomon Wilcots (sideline reporter)

==== Week 13 (Sunday November 26, 2000): at Cincinnati Bengals ====
	1	2	3	4	Total
**Steelers**	14	10	21	3	**48**
Bengals	7	7	7	7	**28**

at Paul Brown Stadium, Cincinnati, Ohio

- Game time: 1:00 p.m. EST
- Game weather:
- Game attendance: 63,925
- Referee: Larry Nemmers
- TV announcers: (CBS) Bill Macatee (play by play), Charles Mann (color commentator)

==== Week 14 (Sunday December 3, 2000): vs. Oakland Raiders ====
	1	2	3	4	Total
Raiders	0	17	0	3	**20**
**Steelers**	7	0	7	7	**21**

at Three Rivers Stadium, Pittsburgh, Pennsylvania

- Game time: 1:00 p.m. EST
- Game weather: 31 °F (−1 °C) (Sunny)
- Game attendance: 54,881
- Referee: Tom White
- TV announcers: (CBS) Kevin Harlan (play by play), Daryl Johnston (color commentator)

With an AFC-best 10–2 record heading into Pittsburgh, the Raiders were favored to win their first game there against the Steelers since 1980. The game that followed was closely contested and featured several hard hits and a controversial ending, renewing attention to the teams’ rivalry from the 1970s.

In the first quarter, Kordell Stewart threw a 19 yard touchdown pass to Bobby Shaw for a 7-0 lead. However, the Steelers fell behind 17-7 in the second quarter. A calf injury to Stewart forced him to the sidelines, and in his relief appearance, Kent Graham threw a pass that was intercepted by Eric Allen and returned 27 yards for a touchdown. Then with 1:06 to go in the half, Rich Gannon found tight end Randy Jordan on a screen pass for a 21 yard touchdown make the score 17-7 Raiders at the half. In the second half, Kordell Stewart returned to play despite his injury and drove the Steelers down to the Raiders's 6 yard line. This drive featured a play where Stewart fumbled at his own 14 yard line, but recovered the ball and escaped the Raiders for 17 yards. On second and goal, Stewart threw a pass in the right flat to tight end Mark Bruener at the 1, when Raiders safety Calvin Branch went into Breuner at full speed and shoved him backwards towards the 5. Unwilling to be stopped short, Breuner fought back and dragged Branch into the end zone with him just before he could be shoved out of bounds, making the score 17-14.

On the first play of the fourth quarter, Stewart ran for a 17 yard touchdown for the Steelers to regain the lead, 21-17. Raiders kicker Sebastian Janikowski kicked a 42 yard field goal to make it 21-20, but with 4 minutes to play, missed another field goal that would have given the Raiders the lead. The Raiders got the ball back with 1:39 left with one last chance to win the game. Rich Gannon completed passes to receivers James Jett and Andre Rison for 11 and 14 yards, then found Tim Brown to convert a fourth down at midfield. The game came down to a controversial call. The Raiders had a fourth and one at the Steelers' 41 yard line, but the sideline crew was slow to switch the down markers from 3 to 4, so Raiders quarterback Rich Gannon called for a pass out in the flat to fullback Jon Ritchie. The Steelers blitzed and forced Gannon to throw incomplete, when the Raiders began to challenge their turnover on downs. Referee Tom White conferred with scorekeeper Charles Heberling to review the down and distance for the previous four plays, and Heberling confirmed that because the previous play was in fact fourth down in spite of what was labeled, the Steelers would be awarded the ball.

During the game, Raiders lineman Regan Upshaw confronted punter Josh Miller after a Steelers punt and spat at him. While Upshaw was not penalized as the refs did not see the incident, CBS cameras did and Upshaw was fined nearly $30,000 after the game.

On the ESPN highlight show NFL Primetime, rather than being shown and recapped with one of the show's standard themes, the highlights were set to the NFL Films songs "A Golden Boy Again" and "Raiders' Theme" to commemorate the final Raiders-Steelers matchup at Three Rivers Stadium, as well as the final game from Three Rivers they would show a highlight from during a regular edition of the show.

==== Week 15 (Sunday December 10, 2000): at New York Giants ====
	1	2	3	4	Total
Steelers	0	3	0	7	**10**
**Giants**	3	10	7	10	**30**

at Giants Stadium, East Rutherford, New Jersey

- Game time: 1:00 p.m. EST
- Game weather:
- Game attendance: 78,164
- Referee: Tony Corrente
- TV announcers: (CBS) Greg Gumbel (play by play), Phil Simms (color commentator), Armen Keteyian (sideline reporter)

Just one week after their big win against the Raiders, the Steelers were blown out against the Giants in New Jersey. The Steelers allowed 333 yards passing from Giants quarterback Kerry Collins, and the Steelers were held to just 47 yards rushing.

The Giants held a 13–3 lead at halftime, and extended their lead to 20–3 after a Collins touchdown pass to Ike Hilliard.

The Steelers's best play of the game, in fact, came on what appeared to be yet another bad play for the team. Kerry Collins completed a pass to a wide-open Hilliard, and he cut to the middle of the field, appearing to break free for what would be a 66 yard touchdown when fullback Greg Comella flattened Steelers safety Ainsley Battles on a block inside the 10, but somehow, Battles rolled into position and tripped up Hilliard at the 7 yard line, and a sure Giants touchdown became a field goal to make it 23-3. Battles's miraculous tackle gave the Steelers one more chance to stay in the game, and Kordell Stewart drove the Steelers inside the 10 yard line, but on fourth and goal, Stewart was intercepted by Reggie Stephens to effectively end any remaining hope the Steelers had. Collins then drove the Giants down the field and threw an insurance touchdown to Amani Toomer to make it 30–3.

The loss put the Steelers at a major disadvantage in the AFC playoff race. With the Steelers at 7-7, the Titans having clinched the division, and the Steelers two games behind the #6 wild card spot in the AFC, the Steelers would have to win out and get major help from other teams in order to qualify for the playoffs.

==== Week 16 (Saturday December 16, 2000): vs. Washington Redskins ====
	1	2	3	4	Total
Redskins	3	0	0	0	**3**
**Steelers**	0	17	0	7	**24**

at Three Rivers Stadium, Pittsburgh, Pennsylvania

- Game time: 12:30 p.m. EST
- Game weather: 39 °F (4 °C) (Rain)
- Game attendance: 58,183
- Referee: Mike Carey
- TV announcers: (FOX) Dick Stockton (play by play), Matt Millen (color commentator), Pam Oliver (sideline reporter)

This was the last game at Three Rivers Stadium.

==== Week 17 (Sunday December 24, 2000): at San Diego Chargers ====
	1	2	3	4	Total
**Steelers**	7	17	0	10	**34**
Chargers	14	0	7	0	**21**

at Qualcomm Stadium, San Diego, California

- Game time: 4:05 p.m. EST
- Game weather: Sunny 60 °F (16 °C) wind 8 mph (13 km/h)
- Game attendance: 50,809
- Referee: Bob McElwee
- TV announcers: (CBS) Gus Johnson (play by play), Brent Jones (color commentator)

Heading into the last Sunday of the 2000 season, the Steelers needed a win, a Jets loss, and a Colts loss in order to earn the last available Wild Card berth in the AFC playoffs. With the Jets losing to the Ravens in a 1:00 game, the Steelers were still alive when their matchup with the 1–14 Chargers started.

Early on in the game, the Chargers demonstrated the potential for an upset bid. On the Chargers's first play from scrimmage, quarterback Ryan Leaf threw a 71-yard touchdown to Jeff Graham, and while Steelers kick returner Will Blackwell answered with a 98 yard kickoff return for a touchdown on the next play, the Chargers held a 14-7 lead after one quarter with Rodney Harrison returning a Kordell Stewart interception 63 yards for a touchdown. However, the Steelers scored 17 unanswered points in the second quarter and never relinquished the lead.

Although Stewart's passing statistics were relatively pedestrian (16-32, 190 yards, and 1 touchdown against 2 interceptions), he ran for 91 yards and 2 touchdowns, and the Steelers held the Chargers to less than 200 yards of total offense while sacking Ryan Leaf six times.

Other than the aforementioned touchdown on the first play, Leaf played poorly as usual, going 15-29 for 171 yards with a touchdown and an interception, giving him only 100 yards passing after his first play. To top it off, he lost a fumble on the last Chargers possession, which turned out to be his last snap as a Charger. Following the game, Leaf stormed out of the locker room without speaking with reporters.

Although the Steelers did their part in winning against the hapless Chargers, the Colts got a big break with their matchup against the Vikings. With the Giants having clinched the #1 seed in the NFC the previous day and the Saints having clinched the NFC West with a worse record than the Vikings, the Vikings could not advance their playoff seed in the playoffs. As a result, the Vikings rested many of their starters (including Daunte Culpepper and Randy Moss) after the first quarter of their game against the Colts, and the Colts capitalized with an easy 31–10 win. This result meant that the Steelers would fail to qualify for the playoffs for the third consecutive season.

== Standings ==
AFC Central
	W	L	T	PCT	PF	PA	STK
^{(1)} Tennessee Titans	13	3	0	.813	346	191	W4
^{(4)} Baltimore Ravens	12	4	0	.750	333	165	W7
Pittsburgh Steelers	9	7	0	.563	321	255	W2
Jacksonville Jaguars	7	9	0	.438	367	327	L2
Cincinnati Bengals	4	12	0	.250	185	359	L1
Cleveland Browns	3	13	0	.188	161	419	L5
