= Destry Rides Again (novel) =

1930 novel by Max Brand

- Author: Max Brand
- Language: English
- Genre: Western fiction
- Publisher: Reader's League of America (serialized version, titled "Twelve Peers," published by Street & Smith's Western Story Magazine).
- Publication date: 1930
- Publication place: United States of America
- OCLC: 47072698

Destry Rides Again is a 1930 western novel by Max Brand. One of Brand's most famous works, it remained in print 70 years after its first publication. It is the story of Harrison Destry's quest for revenge against the 12 jurors whose personal malice leads them to wrongfully convict him of robbery.

== Plot summary ==
Harrison Destry, a man who thinks he is better than anyone else and is constantly "proving" it by his skill with a gun, and his ability to win fistfights he provokes, has just lost his horse and his saddle in a card game. (A cowboy who loses his saddle loses the respect of other cowboys.) He has few friends and many enemies (most of whom he created) in his hometown of Wham, Texas. But the teenage Charlotte Dangerfield, the daughter of a wealthy rancher, adores him.

Only one of the men Destry has beaten in a fight, Chester Bent, seems to bear him no ill-will; Bent stakes the penniless Destry $100. But Bent has just robbed the Express, and (when the wind blows Destry's jacket open) slips cash from the robbery into Destry's pocket. Knowing Destry's character, Bent expects he will waste the money on liquor and gambling, rather than replacing his horse and saddle. This is indeed what happens, and Destry becomes the prime suspect, the planted cash being all but proof of his guilt.

Failing to comprehend how much trouble he is in, Destry neglects his defense and is stunned when convicted by a jury stacked with his enemies, who ignore the fact that the robber's description bears no relation whatever to Destry. He is sentenced to 10 years and swears to wreak vengeance on the jurors. Only Charlotte believes Destry is not guilty.

Released six years later for good behavior, Destry sets about systematically ruining the jurors' lives. He does not murder any of them, though he kills some in self-defense. Destry explains he is determined to stay within the law from now on (though some of his actions, such as trespassing and safe-cracking, are of dubious legality). His chief concern is to show that none of the "jury of his peers" is, in fact, his equal. Destry remains ignorant of Bent's role in framing him; Bent is one of the few people who treat Destry kindly, and Destry comes to count Bent as his best friend. But Bent is helping the remaining jurors organize to murder their nemesis. Anticipating a possible showdown with Destry, Bent has improved his shooting and fighting skills to the point where he is better than Destry.

While on the run, Destry meets Willie Thornton, a boy who has adopted Destry as his hero, based on the tall tales he has been told. Thornton later secretly observes Bent murdering a creditor. Bent uses Destry's knife to kill his victim, in order to frame Destry again. Bent then spots Willie and chases him; Willie escapes by diving into a raging river, from which he emerges weak and sick. Though running a fever, Willie steals a horse and makes a long, hard ride back to Wham to warn Destry of Bent's treachery. So warned, Destry fights his way out of a trap Bent has laid for him. The story's emotional climax occurs when Destry realizes Willie risked his life to save him and might very well die:

...he felt a sudden scorn for the baser parts that were in him, the idler, the scoffer at others, the disdainful mocker at the labors of life. He wished to be simple, real, quiet, able to command the affection of his peers. ...for the first time he could realize the meaning of the word “peer”. Equal. For all men are equal. Not equal in strength of hand, in talent, in craft, in speed of foot or in leap of mind, but equal in mystery, in the identity of the race that breathes through all men, out of the soil, and out of the heavens. So it was that hatred for his enemies left him.

Wham's sheriff, Ding Slater, deputizes Destry, and Destry tries to arrest Bent. But Bent outdraws Destry and shoots Destry's Colt out of his hand; Destry is saved only by Slater's gunfire from the window. Bent flees, with Destry in pursuit. Overtaking Bent, Destry unmounts his enemy, but Bent overpowers Destry and leaps onto Destry's horse, making a last mad dash for freedom. In a most uncharacteristic climax for a Western, Destry shoots Bent in the back as the unarmed man flees. But Destry realizes the shot was lucky and proves nothing about his skill with a gun.

Returning to the devoted Charlotte Dangerfield, Destry announces he will lay down his guns forever, acknowledging that he found his peer in Bent.

== Characters ==
- Harrison "Harry" Destry - The hero of the novel, a self-described "waster" who is supremely talented with his fists and his gun.
- Chester "Chet" Bent - Destry's secret antagonist, a treacherous businessman and investor, but Destry's eventual equal as a marksman and pugilist. Like many of Wham's citizens, he had once been bested by Destry in a fistfight and has long wanted revenge.
- Willie Thornton - A poor boy, he's disenchanted when he discovers that his father's claims to friendship with Destry are lies, and he determines to become a real friend of Destry.
- Charlotte "Charlie" Dangerfield - The daughter of a rich rancher, Charlotte is fond of and loyal to Destry, despite his irresponsible ways.
- Fiddle - Destry's mare, a mount of unusual speed, stamina, and eagerness for the run.
- Ding Slater - The sheriff of Wham, he arrests Destry for robbing the Express but later realizes Destry is innocent and helps him.
- Judd Ogden - One of the jurors who convicts Destry, he later tries to murder Destry and is shot dead by his quarry.
- Martin Ogden - Brother of Judd, he also tries to murder Destry and is crippled for life by Destry's bullet.
- Jerry Wendell - The third juror to encounter Destry, he is shown up for a coward by fleeing him.
- Clyde Orrin - Another juror and a rising politician, he is ruined when Destry exposes the bribes he has been taking from the T & O Railroad.
- Sam Warren - Another juror, he leads a gang of nine men to try to shoot Destry down, but Destry kills him in a shootout in a darkened barn.
- Lefty Turnbull - Another juror, Destry wounds and arrests him for robbery.
- Jimmy Clifton - A friend and creditor of Chester Bent; Bent murders him to frame Destry and avoid paying his debts.
- Hank Cleves - A blacksmith and juror, he unsuccessfully attempts to ambush Destry and is shot dead.

== Setting ==
The action takes place mostly in and around the fictional town of Wham, Texas. Clyde Orrin's scenes transpire in Austin, Texas.

The time setting of Destry Rides Again is never explicitly stated, and obvious markers such as presidents or governors are not mentioned. The use of telephones definitely places the action no earlier than 1878, when telephones were first introduced to Texas. Brand mentions Lefty Turnbull has been to the Klondike River and back; while Turnbull could theoretically have gone to the Klondike at any time, it is most likely that Turnbull would have participated in the Klondike Gold Rush, marking Destry's release as no earlier than 1897, and probably at least two years later to allow Turnbull adequate time to have gone to Canada and returned. Furthermore, Charlie Dangerfield refers to Mount McKinley in chapter 32. Denali Mountain in Alaska was not referred to as Mount McKinley until 1897, implying the events of the novel, particularly Destry's release, would have taken place around or after 1897. If the T&O Railroad that bribes Clyde Orrin is the Oklahoma City & Texas Railroad, then that would place Destry's release no later than 1904, the date of the Oklahoma City & Texas's sale to the St. Louis, San Francisco & Texas line. In any event, the absence of references to motor cars or to any man having served in World War I suggests a setting no later than 1916.

== Publication history ==
Destry Rides Again was first published in 1930, in a series of installments under the title "Twelve Peers" in Frank Blackwell's Western Story Magazine. It was republished, as a paperback, later that year under the title Destry Rides Again. The word "again" in the title refers to Destry's renewed freedom to ride after being let out of prison, not to any previous story; this novel was the Destry character's fiction debut.

Destry Rides Again was in print continuously from its first publication in 1930 until at least 2000.

== Adaptations in other media ==
=== Film ===
Three film versions were made between 1932 and 1954. These owe little to the novel other than their name; the plots are completely unrelated to Brand's story, and Destry's first name is also changed to Tom in the movies.

- Destry Rides Again (1932), starring Tom Mix
- Destry Rides Again (1939), starring James Stewart
- Destry (1954), with Audie Murphy

=== Musical ===
- In 1959, Destry Rides Again was made into a Broadway musical.

=== Television ===
- 1964 saw a Destry television series, starring John Gavin as Harrison Destry, run for thirteen weeks.

== In popular culture ==
- In Cormac McCarthy's third Border Trilogy novel, Cities of the Plain, Billy Parham is reading Destry when John Grady asks him about the White Lake brothel, where John has learned the whore, he loves is located. Billy emphatically warns John not to go there.
