= Destry (film) =

1954 film by George Marshall

- Theatrical release poster by Reynold Brown
- Directed by: George Marshall
- Screenplay by: Edmund H. North; D.D. Beauchamp
- Story by: Felix Jackson
- Based on: Destry Rides Again by Max Brand
- Produced by: Stanley Rubin
- Starring: Audie Murphy; Mari Blanchard; Lyle Bettger; Lori Nelson; Thomas Mitchell; Edgar Buchanan; Wallace Ford; Mary Wickes; Alan Hale Jr.
- Cinematography: George Robinson
- Edited by: Ted J. Kent
- Music by: Henry Mancini; Frank Skinner; Herman Stein
- Color process: Technicolor
- Production company: Universal Pictures
- Distributed by: Universal Pictures
- Release dates: December 1, 1954 (United States); January 19, 1955 (Los Angeles)
- Running time: 95 minutes
- Country: United States
- Language: English
- Box office: $1.5 million (US)

Destry is a 1954 American Western film directed by George Marshall and starring Audie Murphy, Mari Blanchard, Lyle Bettger and Thomas Mitchell.

This, the third film to use the title character of Max Brand's novel Destry Rides Again, is a color remake of the black-&-white 1939 Marlene Dietrich and James Stewart film version. Indeed, Halliwell's Film Guide calls it an "almost scene-for-scene remake." Both films were directed by George Marshall and have a plot bearing no resemblance to Brand's novel or the original 1932 film adaptation.

== Plot ==
The sheriff of a small western town is shot dead after retrieving a promissory note for a ranch won by cheating in a poker game. It is put over that he died of natural causes. The crooked mayor, The Honorable Hiram J. Sellers, and leading crook Phil Decker appoint the town drunk, Reginald T. "Rags" Barnaby, as the new sheriff, believing that he will be easily controlled by them. Rags, however, immediately announces he is giving up drinking and refuses to accept Decker as his new deputy, telling them that he has someone else in mind: Tom Destry, the son of a famed two-fisted lawman.

Destry arrives on the stagecoach with great fanfare, but Rags is disappointed to find out that unlike his father the son is a young man who refuses to carry a gun. Destry prefers friendly persuasion and use of the law over violence. Destry finds out that the previous sheriff may not have died of a heart attack as had been claimed; he suspects that the sheriff was murdered while trying to resolve a land dispute, and he sets about finding out how the sheriff actually died. After Decker orchestrates a public display of humiliation against the new deputy, with the help of his girlfriend Brandy, Destry tricks them into unholstering their weapons and then surprises them all: while he prefers non-violence, he is expertly proficient with their own guns, turning the tables on the perceived sentiment against him with an impressive sharp-shooting display. All the while his public bravado was merely a cover to collect evidence for analysis.

Eventually it becomes clear that Decker shot and killed the sheriff in order to further his plans to obtain all the land necessary to control and exploit the transit of cattle over those properties. With the help of cattleman Jack Larson, who had earlier almost come to blows with Destry but ultimately comes to a respectful accord with the new deputy, arrests from Decker's gang are made and it seems evident that Decker will be arrested for the murder. However a jailbreak is committed, on Decker's orders, and Barnaby is killed in the jail. Destry finally abandons his resolve to seek orderly resolution and heads to the saloon with gun in hand. A shootout follows, in which Decker, his gang, the mayor and even Brandy (who sacrifices herself to save Destry) are killed. With law and order restored, Destry is appointed the new sheriff.

== Cast ==
- Audie Murphy as Tom Destry
- Mari Blanchard as Brandy
- Lyle Bettger as Decker
- Thomas Mitchell as Rags Barnaby
- Edgar Buchanan as Mayor Sellers
- Lori Nelson as Martha Phillips
- Wallace Ford as Doc Curtis
- Mary Wickes as Bessie Mae Curtis
- Alan Hale Jr. as Jack Larson
- George Wallace as Curly
- Richard Reeves as Mac
- Walter Baldwin as Henry Skinner
- Lee Aaker as Eil Skinner
- Anthony Lawrence as Professor (as Mitchell Lawrence)
- Frank Richards as Dummy
- Trevor Bardette as Sheriff Bailey
- Ralph Peters as Bartender
- John Doucette as Coward
