= Jack Prince =

Jack Prince may refer to:

- Jack Prince (footballer)
- Jack Prince (singer)
