= The Johnny Carson Show =

Television series

- Presented by: Johnny Carson
- Theme music composer: Jerome Kern (music) and Dorothy Fields (lyrics)
- Opening theme: "Pick Yourself Up"
- Country of origin: United States
- Original language: English
- No. of seasons: 1
- No. of episodes: 39

Production
- Producer: Ben Brady
- Production locations: Vine Street Theater; 1313 North Vine Street, Hollywood, California
- Running time: 30 minutes

Original release
- Network: CBS
- Release: June 30, 1955 – March 29, 1956

The Johnny Carson Show is a 1955–56 half-hour primetime television variety show starring Johnny Carson.

While working as a staff writer on The Red Skelton Show, local Los Angeles television comedian Carson filled in as host when Skelton was injured during a show rehearsal. As a result of Carson’s performance, CBS created the primetime variety program The Johnny Carson Show, a traditional potpourri of comedy, music, dance, skits, and monologues. Jack Prince was the male vocalist on the series. It aired on Thursday nights at 10pm ET.

The short-lived 1955–56 series served as a precursor of what came later for Carson, planting the seeds for sketches he performed on the later The Tonight Show Starring Johnny Carson, such as "Mighty Carson Art Players". However, the show flopped in the ratings and was quickly cancelled. This show was produced in Los Angeles at the Vine Street Theater. The show was alternately sponsored by Revlon and General Foods (Jell-O, instant Sanka, and Minute Rice).

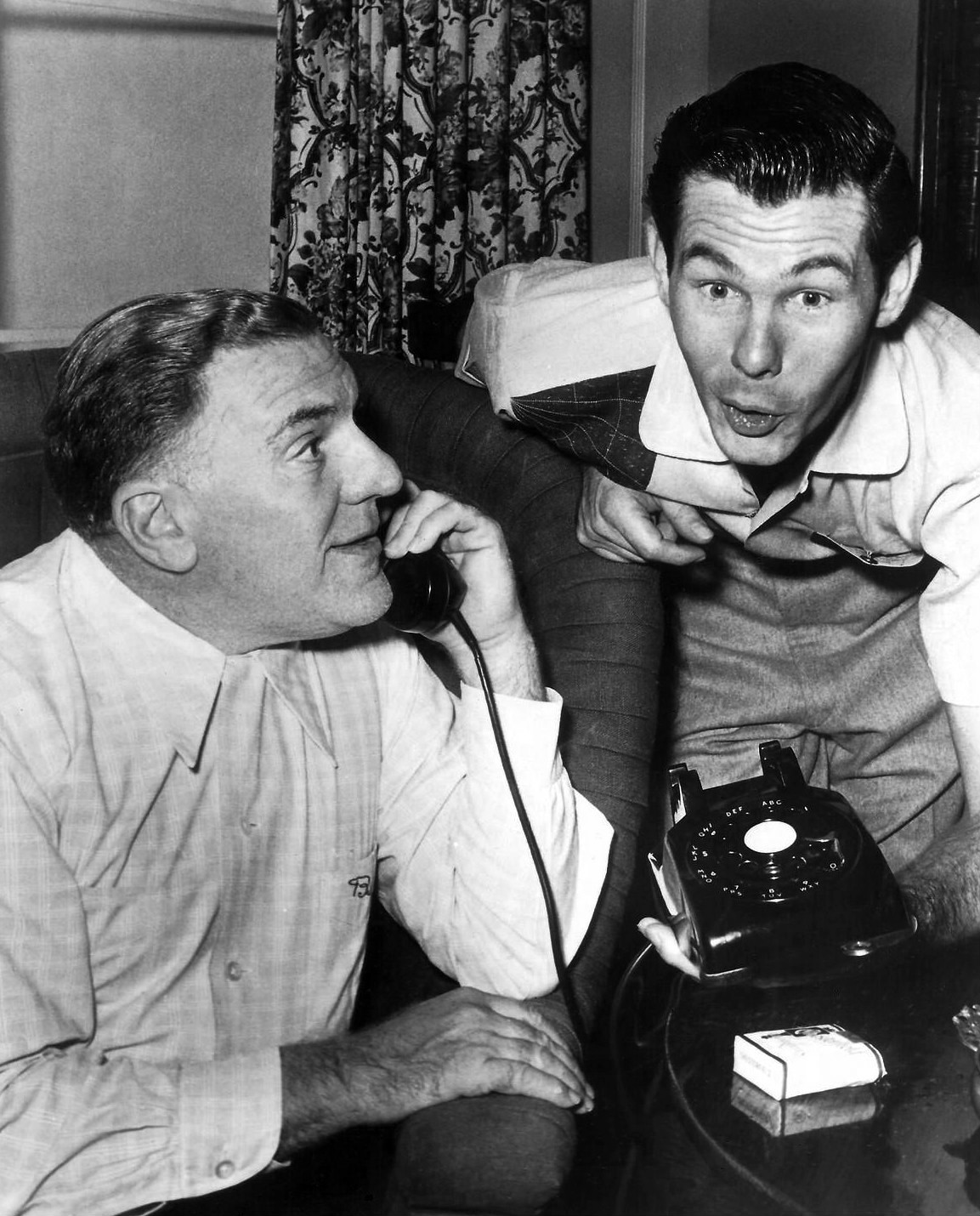
Carson (right) with guest William Bendix in 1955

In a 1978 profile of Carson in The New Yorker, Kenneth Tynan described the Johnny Carson Show as "a half-hour program that goes through seven directors, eight writers, and 39 weeks of worsening health before expiring, in the spring of 1956." Carson wound up hosting a daytime game show called Who Do You Trust? (1957–62) until he was tapped by NBC to replace the departing Jack Paar as host of The Tonight Show in 1962, a position Carson held for 30 years.

Kinescopes of 10 episodes from the series were discovered in a closet by Carson's second wife Joanne and released by Shout Factory on DVD in 2007. Joanne Carson says the kinescopes were hand-picked by Carson as a courtship gift to her and featured his favorite episodes from the series. Additional episodes survive at the UCLA Film and Television Archive.

Following the cancellation of the series, CBS assigned Carson to host another series, this time airing in a daytime time slot. This series also was titled The Johnny Carson Show and began in May 1956, but ran only through the summer. A single episode of this version is included on Shout Factory's DVD release of the 1955–56 series.

Media offices
| Preceded by none | Television show hosted by Johnny Carson; 30 June 1955 – 29 March 1956 | Succeeded by Who Do You Trust? |
