= Libi Staiger =

American actress (1928–2019)

- Born: Elizabeth Anne Staiger; January 10, 1928; Harrisburg, Illinois, U.S.
- Died: September 25, 2019 (aged 91); Austin, Texas, U.S.
- Occupation: Actress
- Years active: 1953–1985
- Spouse: Jerome Eskow

Elizabeth Anne Staiger (January 10, 1928 – September 25, 2019), known as Libi Staiger, was an American actress who primarily worked on stage. Her career, which included roles on Broadway from 1953, was ended by the failure of her first starring vehicle, 1963's Sophie, a musical-comedy life story of entertainer Sophie Tucker.

Staiger was born in Harrisburg, Illinois, and died in Austin, Texas.

== Performances ==
=== Theatre ===
- Sophie (Sophie), Winter Garden Theatre, New York, April 15–20, 1963.
- Destry Rides Again (Chloe; standby for Frenchie), Imperial Theatre, New York, April 23, 1959 - June 18, 1960.
- The Most Happy Fella (Cleo), London Coliseum, London, opened April 21, 1960.

=== Film ===
- Hanky Panky (1982) - Buck's Wife

=== Television ===
- Kate & Allie in episode Dressed to Kill, December 23, 1985.
