= Destry Rides Again =

1939 film

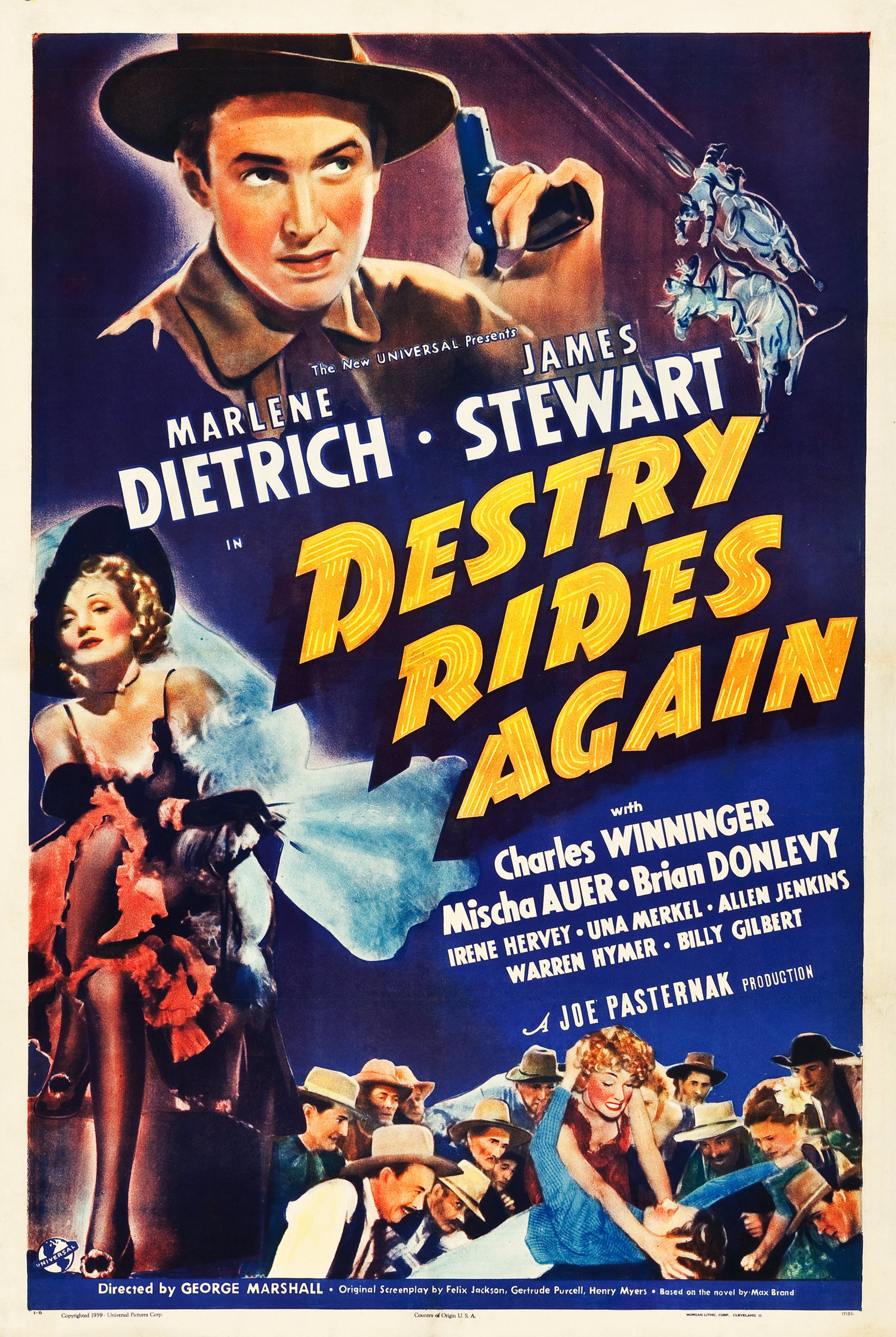
- Theatrical release poster
- Directed by: George Marshall
- Written by: Original story by Felix Jackson
- Screenplay by: Felix Jackson; Gertrude Purcell; Henry Myers
- Based on: Suggested by Max Brand's novel Destry Rides Again
- Produced by: Joe Pasternak
- Starring: Marlene Dietrich; James Stewart; Charles Winninger; Mischa Auer; Brian Donlevy; Irene Hervey; Una Merkel; Allen Jenkins; Warren Hymer; Billy Gilbert
- Cinematography: Hal Mohr, A.S.C.
- Edited by: Milton Carruth
- Music by: Frank Skinner
- Production companies: A Joe Pasternak Production; Universal Pictures
- Distributed by: Universal Pictures Company, Inc.
- Release date: December 29, 1939 (United States)
- Running time: 95 minutes
- Country: United States
- Language: English
- Budget: $700,000 or $765,000
- Box office: $1.6 million

Destry Rides Again is a 1939 American Western comedy film directed by George Marshall for Universal Pictures with stars Marlene Dietrich and James Stewart. The supporting cast includes Charles Winninger, Mischa Auer, Brian Donlevy, Irene Hervey and Una Merkel.

The opening credits contain the billing "Suggested by Max Brand's novel Destry Rides Again", but the movie is considerably different and also bears little resemblance to Universal's 1932 adaptation of the 1930 novel. The 1932 film, originally released as Destry Rides Again with star Tom Mix in his first sound film, has been retitled for post-1939 screenings as Justice Rides Again.

In 1996, Destry Rides Again was selected for preservation in the United States National Film Registry by the Library of Congress as being "culturally, historically, or aesthetically significant".

== Plot ==
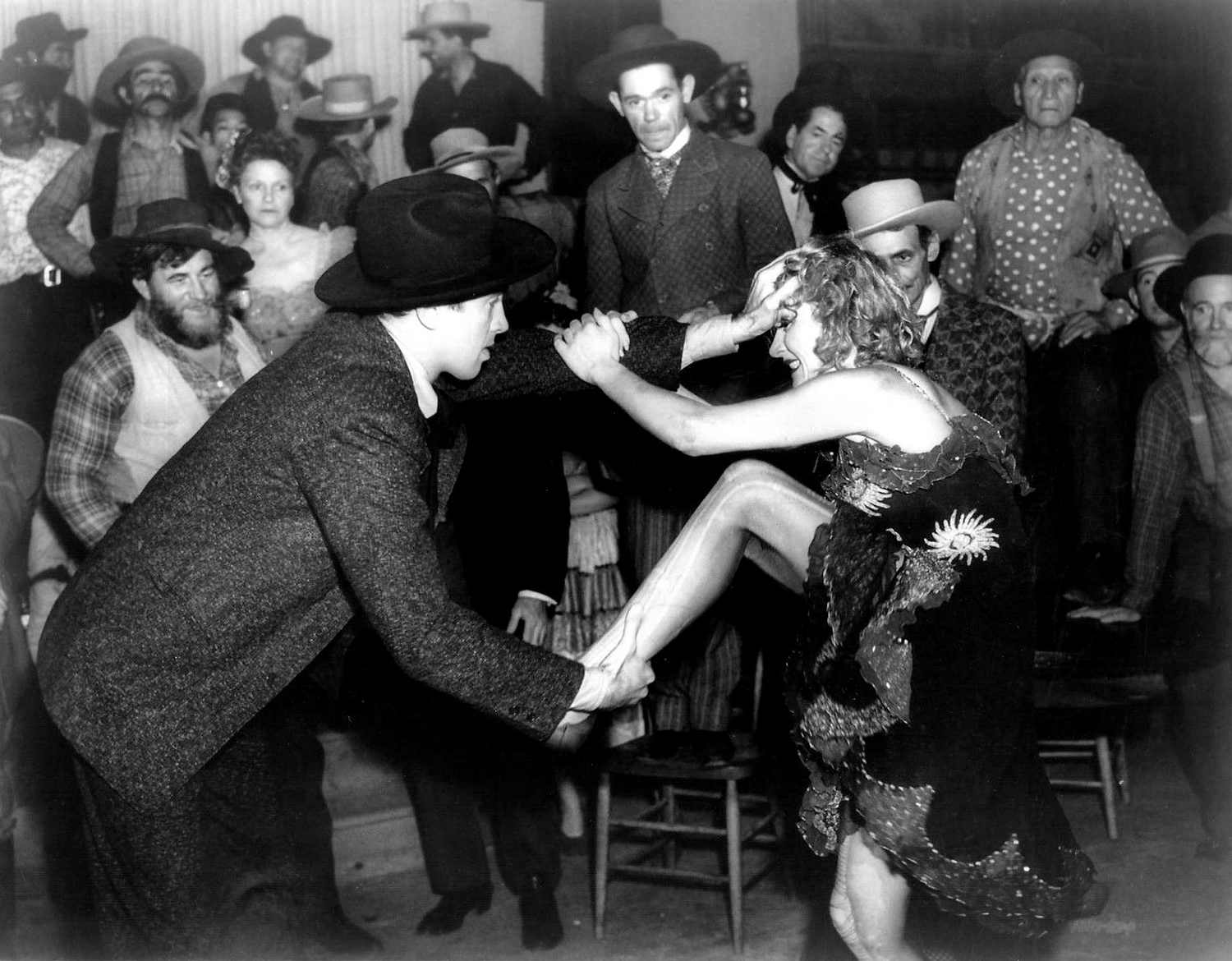
James Stewart and Marlene Dietrich in Destry Rides Again

Saloon owner Kent, the unscrupulous boss of the fictional Western town of Bottleneck, has the town's sheriff, Mr. Keogh, killed when Keogh asks one too many questions about a rigged poker game. Kent and Frenchy, a cheap saloon tramp who is his girlfriend, now have a stranglehold over the local cattle ranchers. The town's crooked mayor, Hiram J. Slade, who is in collusion with Kent, appoints the town drunk, Washington Dimsdale, as the new sheriff, assuming that he will be easy to control and manipulate. However, Dimsdale, a deputy under the famous lawman Tom Destry, promptly swears off drinking, and is able to call upon the latter's equally formidable son, Tom Destry Jr., to help him make Bottleneck a lawful, respectable town.

Destry arrives in Bottleneck with Jack Tyndall, a cattleman, and his sister, Janice. Destry initially confounds the townsfolk by refusing to strap on a gun and maintaining civility in dealing with everyone, including Kent and Frenchy. This quickly makes him a disappointment to Dimsdale and a laughingstock to the townspeople; he is mockingly asked to "clean up" Bottleneck by being given a mop and bucket. However, after a number of rowdy horsemen ride into town shooting their pistols in the air, he demonstrates uncanny expertise in marksmanship and threatens to jail them if they do it again, earning the respect of Bottleneck's citizens.

Through the townsmen's evasive answers regarding the whereabouts of Keogh, Destry gradually begins to suspect that Keogh was murdered. He confirms this by provoking Frenchy into admitting it, but without a location for the body, he lacks any proof. Destry therefore deputizes Boris, a Russian immigrant whom Frenchy had earlier humiliated, and implies to Kent that he had found the body outside of town "in remarkably good condition". When Kent sends a member of his gang to check on Keogh's burial site, Boris and Dimsdale follow, capture, and jail him.

Although the gang member is charged with Keogh's murder (in the hope that he would implicate Kent in exchange for clemency), Mayor Slade appoints himself judge of the trial, making an innocent verdict a foregone conclusion. To prevent this, Destry calls in a judge from a larger city in secret, but the plan is ruined after Boris accidentally gives away the other judge's name in the saloon. Kent orders Frenchy to invite the deputy to her house while other gang members storm the sheriff's office and cause a breakout; now in love with Destry, she accepts. When shots are fired, he rushes back, to find the cell empty and Dimsdale mortally wounded. Destry returns to his room and puts on his gun belt, abandoning his previous commitment to nonviolence.

Under Destry's command, the honest townsmen form a posse and prepare to attack the saloon, where Kent's gang is fortified, while Destry enters through the roof and looks for Kent. At Frenchy's urging, the townswomen march in between the groups, preventing further violence, before breaking into the saloon and subduing the gang. Kent narrowly escapes, and attempts to shoot Destry from the second floor; Frenchy takes the bullet for him, killing her, and Destry kills Kent.

Some time later, Destry is shown to be the sheriff of a now lawful Bottleneck, repeating to children the stories that Dimsdale told him of the town's violent history. He jokingly tells a story about marriage to Janice, implying a marriage between them will soon follow.

== Cast ==
As appearing in screen credits:

- Marlene Dietrich as Frenchy, the saloon singer
- James Stewart as Tom Destry, Jr., the new deputy
- Mischa Auer as Boris Alexandrovich Stavrogin, the henpecked Russian married to Lily Belle
- Charles Winninger as Washington Dimsdale, the new sheriff
- Brian Donlevy as Kent, the saloon owner
- Allen Jenkins as Gyp Watson
- Warren Hymer as Bugs Watson
- Irene Hervey as Janice Tyndall
- Una Merkel as Lily Belle, "Mrs. Boris Callahan"
- Billy Gilbert as Loupgerou, the bartender
- Samuel S. Hinds as Judge Slade, the mayor
- Jack Carson as Jack Tyndall
- Tom Fadden as Lem Claggett
- Virginia Brissac as Sophie Claggett
- Edmund MacDonald as Rockwell
- Lillian Yarbo as Clara, Frenchy's maid
- Joe King as Sheriff Keogh
- Dickie Jones as Claggett Boy
- Ann Todd as Claggett Girl

Uncredited (in order of appearance)
Rudy Bowman	townsman in Kent's saloon
Slim Gaut	townsman in Kent's saloon
George Chesebro	townsman in Kent's saloon
Philo McCullough	bartender in Kent's saloon
Duke York	townsman in Kent's saloon
Billy Bletcher	pianist in Kent's saloon
Robert Milasch	member of Kent's insider group at meeting
Al Taylor	member of Kent's insider group at meeting
Bill Cody Jr.	boy informing sheriff Wash that Destry is arriving
Harry Tenbrook	shotgun rider on stagecoach
Lloyd Ingraham	express agent carrying a box with rabbits
Ken Maynard	cowboy arriving in Bottleneck
William Steele	cowboy arriving in Bottleneck
Marjorie Kane	bar girl in Kent's saloon
Dan White	drunkard in Kent's saloon
Ed Brady	drunkard in Kent's saloon

== Songs ==
Dietrich sings "See What the Boys in the Back Room Will Have" and "You've Got That Look", written by Frank Loesser, set to music by Frederick Hollander, which have become classics, as well as a revised version the "Little Joe the Wrangler".

== Production ==
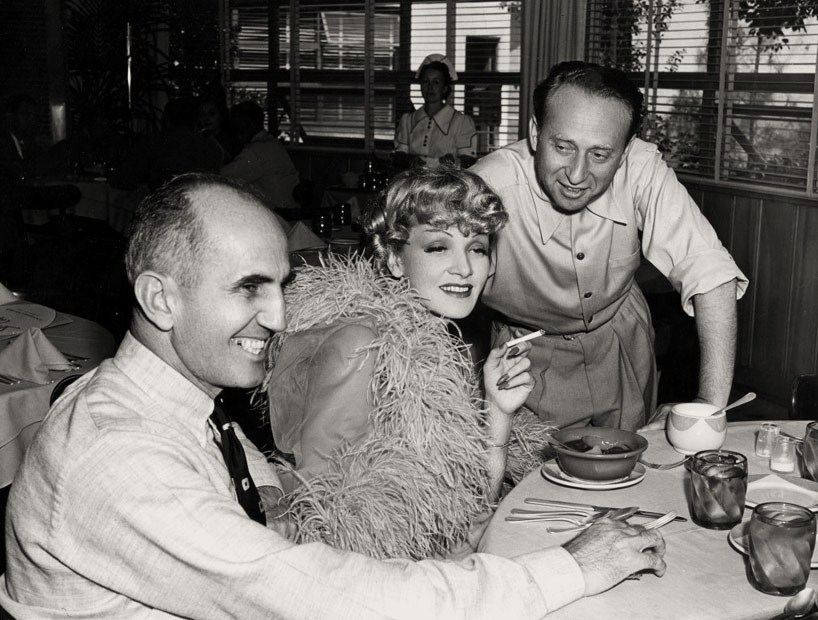
Director George Marshall, Marlene Dietrich and producer Joe Pasternak on the set of Destry Rides Again

Western writer Max Brand contributed the novel Destry Rides Again, but the film also owes its origins to Brand's serial "Twelve Peers", published in a pulp magazine. In the original work, Harrison (or "Harry") Destry was not a pacifist. As filmed in 1932, with Tom Mix in the starring role, the central character differed in that Destry did wear six-guns.

The film was James Stewart's first Western (he would not return to the genre until 1950, with Winchester '73, followed by Broken Arrow). The story featured a ferocious cat-fight between Marlene Dietrich and Una Merkel, which apparently caused a mild censorship problem at the time of release. The film also represented Dietrich's return to Hollywood after a string of flops at Paramount ("Angel", "The Scarlet Empress", "The Devil is a Woman") caused her and other stars to be labelled "box office poison". While vacationing at Cap d'Antibes with her family, her mentor Josef von Sternberg and her lover Erich Maria Remarque, she received an offer from Joe Pasternak to come to Universal at half the salary she had been receiving for most of the 1930s. Pasternak had previously tried to sign Dietrich to Universal while she was still in Berlin. Unsure of what to do she was advised by von Sternberg "I made you into a Goddess. Now show them you have feet of clay."

According to writer/director Peter Bogdanovich, Marlene Dietrich told him during an aircraft flight that she and James Stewart had an affair during shooting and that she became pregnant but had a surreptitious abortion without telling Stewart.

Internationally, the film was released under the alternative titles Femme ou Démon in French and Arizona in Spanish.

== Reception ==
Destry Rides Again was generally well accepted by the public, as well as critics. It was reviewed by Frank S. Nugent in The New York Times, who observed that the film did not follow the usual Hollywood type-casting. On Dietrich's role, he characterized: "It's difficult to reconcile Miss Dietrich's Frenchy, the cabaret girl of the Bloody Gulch Saloon, with the posed and posturing Dietrich we last saw in Mr. Lubitsch's 'Angel'." Stewart's contribution was similarly treated, "turning in an easy, likable, pleasantly humored performance."

On the review aggregator website Rotten Tomatoes, 96% of 23 critics' reviews are positive, with an average rating of 7.7/10. On Metacritic, the film has a score of 81 out of 100, based on 9 critics, indicating "universal acclaim".

== Other versions ==
- Universal Pictures released an earlier film, also titled Destry Rides Again (1932), directed by Benjamin Stoloff and starring Tom Mix and ZaSu Pitts. Apart from the title, the story has no connection with the later film and is sometimes retitled as Justice Rides Again.
- A Lux Radio Theater version of the story which aired November 5, 1945, starred Jimmy Stewart and Joan Blondell.
- An almost shot-for-shot remake of the 1939 production, Destry (1954), was also directed by George Marshall and stars Audie Murphy and Thomas Mitchell.
- A Broadway musical version of the story, Destry Rides Again, opened in New York City at the Imperial Theatre on April 23, 1959, and played 472 performances. Produced by David Merrick, the show had a book by Leonard Gershe, music and lyrics by Harold Rome, and starred Andy Griffith as Destry and Dolores Gray as Frenchy.
- ABC aired a 13-episode mid-season replacement TV series in 1964, Destry, based on the 1939 and 1954 films, starring John Gavin as the son of the movie's title character.

== In popular culture ==
Marlene Dietrich's character, Frenchy, was the inspiration for the character of Lili Von Shtupp in the Western parody Blazing Saddles.
