= Jack Prince (singer) =

American singer

- Jack Prince in The Andy Griffith Show 1963
- Born: John Trevathian Upchurch Jr. January 19, 1920; Shreveport, Louisiana, US
- Died: January 8, 1994 (aged 73); Las Vegas, Nevada, US
- Resting place: Hillside Memorial Park Redlands, California
- Other name: Jack Prince
- Occupations: Singer, actor
- Spouses: Sarah Zelda Saltzer (m. 1945; div. 1958) Ruth Frances Gleason (m. 1958–1959)
- Children: 4

John Trevathian Upchurch Jr. (January 19, 1920 – January 8, 1994), professionally known as Jack Prince, was a singer and an occasional actor who incorporated his mother's maiden name into his professional name of Prince. He performed in Broadway plays, sang in nightclubs, and was a regular on a 1955 television variety show. Prince is best remembered for playing Rafe Hollister on The Andy Griffith Show.

== Early years ==
Prince was born January 19, 1920, in Shreveport, Louisiana, the son of John Trevathian Upchurch and Betty Prince Upchurch. During the Second World War he served in the U. S. Army and was stationed in France, where he formed a band called "The Chowhounds."

== Singing and acting career ==
After leaving military service Prince became a vocalist for the Shep Fields band. He then sang in night clubs, including Colosimo's Cafe Chicago, Alan Gale's Celebrity Club Miami, and Billy Gray's Band Box, Hollywood. A Billboard review stated “With a style as infectious as a ton of honey Prince is a cinch to rise to greater heights.”

During the 1950 to 1953 Broadway run of Guys and Dolls, Prince was the replacement actor for the role of Nicely Nicely Johnson. Starting in 1956, he was the understudy and replacement actor for Marrying’ Sam in Li'l Abner. Prince's final Broadway performance was playing Wash in the 1959 to 1960 production of Destry Rides Again. Andy Griffith played the lead role.

Prince stated "The reason I left Broadway was that I’m a singer. I’m not an actor – unless it’s something real simple."

One of Prince's first television appearances was on the July 25, 1954 episode of The Colgate Comedy Hour. From June 30, 1955, to March 29, 1956, he was the male vocalist on the CBS variety show The Johnny Carson Show.

When The Andy Griffith Show began, Griffith remembered his Destry Rides Again co-star and asked Prince to appear on the show. During the first season Prince played Ben Sewell on the January 30, 1961 episode Alcohol and Old Lace. He was Luke Rainer in the April 10, 1961 episode The Inspector, and was a rummage sale customer in the April 21, 1961 episode Andy Forecloses. During seasons two and three Prince played farmer and moonshiner Rafe Hollister in three episodes – Sheriff Barney (December 25, 1961), The County Nurse (March 19, 1962), and Rafe Hollister Sings (February 11, 1963). Griffith wanted him to appear in additional episodes, but Prince felt acting on the show would interfere with his singing opportunities.

From 1963 to 1964 Prince sang with the Harry James Band. Little is known of his work during the 1970s and 80s. In September 1991 Prince reprised his role of Rafe Hollister on TNN's Nashville Now. He and Hal Smith, who played town drunk Otis Campbell on The Andy Griffith Show, appeared together in a jail skit, and Prince sang The Lonesome Road, a song heard in the Rafe Hollister Sings episode.

== Death ==
Jack Prince died in Las Vegas on January 8, 1994. He is buried in Hillside Memorial Park, in Redlands, California.
