= Destry Rides Again (musical) =

1959 musical comedy

- 1959 Original Cast Recording
- Music: Harold Rome
- Lyrics: Harold Rome
- Book: Leonard Gershe
- Basis: Film Destry Rides Again

Destry Rides Again is a 1959 musical comedy with music and lyrics by Harold Rome and a book by Leonard Gershe. The play is based on the 1939 film of the same name.

== Production history ==
The show opened on Broadway at the Imperial Theatre on April 23, 1959, and closed on June 18, 1960, after 472 performances. Michael Kidd was the director and choreographer. The cast starred Andy Griffith as Destry and Dolores Gray as Frenchy. The national tour starred John Raitt and Anne Jeffreys, while Yvonne De Carlo appeared in the show in such venues as the Paper Mill Playhouse and the Dallas Summer Musicals.

The plot was loosely based on a story by Max Brand. The song sung by Marlene Dietrich in the film, "See What the Boys in the Back Room Will Have", was not used in the stage production.

== Synopsis ==
=== Act 1 ===
The opening song ("Bottleneck") shows the roughness and violence of the town Bottleneck. Then, at the Last Chance Saloon, Frenchy and her girls perform for the male patrons of The Last Chance ("Ladies"). After the song, Clagget stomps into the bar with Sheriff Keogh. Clagget accuses Frenchy and Kent of stealing his ranch in a crooked poker game last night. Kent strides out calmly, greeting the sheriff. Kent states that he won and Clagget lost. Sheriff Keogh asks them to step into his office. Kent, Gyp and Bugs Watson, and the sheriff go into Kent's office. Clagget angrily storms out of the saloon while Rockwell and Frenchy reveal that she did steal one of Clagget's aces. But in the middle of their laughter, a gunshot is heard and the laughing grinds to a halt. Kent and his gang come out, explaining that Gyp Watson's pistol accidentally went off. Slade tells Kent that shooting Keogh was a mistake and they were moving too fast. One of Kent's gang hands Slade the sheriff badge and Kent tells Slade that it's up to him to appoint a new sheriff. Slade makes an announcement to the patrons of the saloon that Sheriff Keogh has left town on urgent business and that Washington Dimsdale will be taking his place. Wash tells the town that he'll bring law and order to the town with the help of Tom Destry ("Hoop De Dingle").

Tom Destry arrives in Bottleneck with a parasol and a canary cage. The townsmen don't think very highly of him and tease him, especially Kent's gang. Destry mistakes their jeering for hospitality, and tells the townspeople how surprised he is by their welcome ("Tomorrow Morning"). When Kent asks Destry for his gun, Destry reveals he doesn't own a gun, to Wash's surprise. Destry meets Frenchy and quickly angers her, and a fight ensues in which Destry and Frenchy are pulled apart by Wash and Kent.

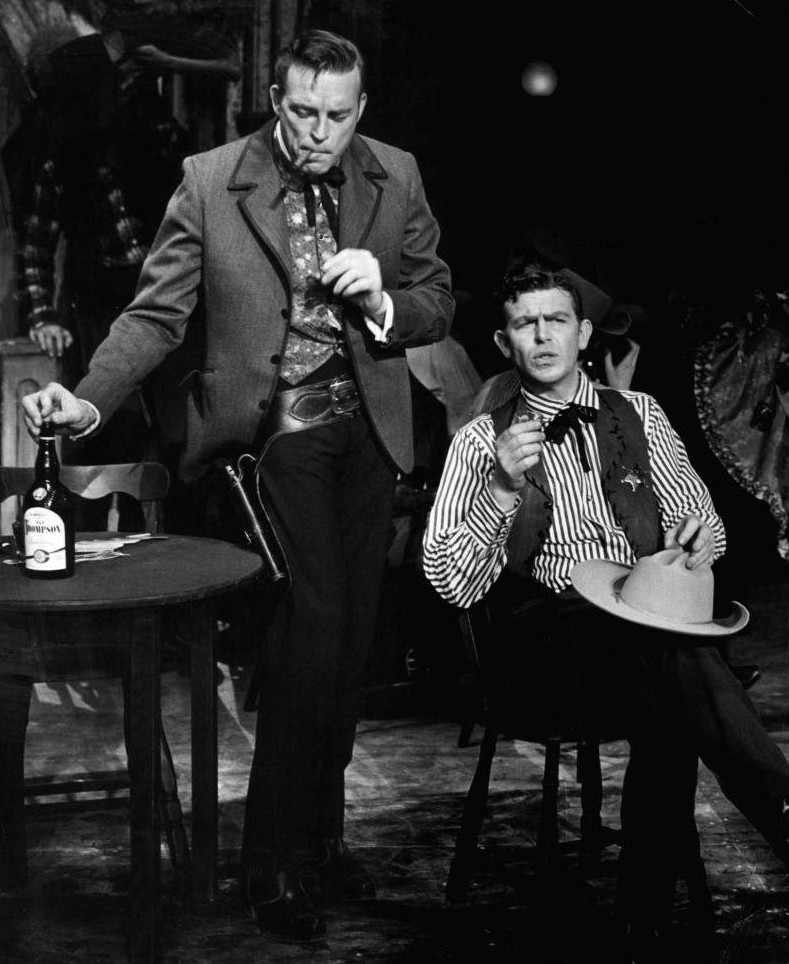
Scott Brady and Andy Griffith, 1959

Wash and Destry run out to the street, where Wash confronts him about not owning a gun. Wash explains that the town has planned a big welcome party for him, but he doesn't think Destry can face anyone now. Destry tells Wash that they won't need guns to bring law and order to Bottleneck: he tells Wash that guns bring only death ("Ballad of the Gun"). Wash then swears Destry in as deputy, and they head for the party. Meanwhile, Kent's gang are seen harassing two girls. They steal a banner the girls were carrying and see that there's to be a social in honor of Destry's arrival and they weren't invited. The gang then hurries off to tell Kent and Frenchy.

In a corral, the party has already started ("The Social") and the townsfolk are seen dancing. Kent and his gang crash the party and threaten the people with whips, until Destry shows up and takes down Kent's gang. The townspeople resume their celebration, and at the end of the social Destry thanks everyone for the party, until he is interrupted by Clagget, who is armed with a rifle. He is followed by his wife, who pleads that he put the gun down. Clagget proclaims that he won't put the gun down until he's killed Kent and his gang. Destry interferes, taking Clagget's rifle while they shake hands. Clagget explains that Kent put him and his wife off their ranch this morning. He relates the story of how he was cheated in the poker game, also mentioning the suspicious "disappearance" of the former sheriff. A few of the other townsmen tell Destry that Kent also took their ranches through similar means. Destry reluctantly tells Clagget that there's nothing that he can do without further evidence. Clagget's wife snaps at Destry and the two leave. A gleeful Kent thanks Destry and leaves with his gang. The townspeople, who now despise Destry, turn away from him.

At Frenchy's house, Destry pays a visit to Frenchy, who tries to seduce him ("I Know Your Kind"). Destry politely tells Frenchy that he's there on official business, but Frenchy becomes angry. Destry gets Frenchy to admit that she had something to do with the disappearance of Sheriff Keogh. She then threatens to throw a perfume bottle at Destry if he didn't leave. Destry leaves, and Clara enters and begins to talk about Destry. Frenchy shoos her out and fumes about Destry ("I Hate Him"). She finishes by smashing her brush into her mirror.

At Rose Lovejoy's house, the men of Bottleneck admire Rose Lovejoy and her girls ("Paradise Alley"). Frenchy and Destry run into each other and Frenchy apologizes for her behavior earlier. They try to be impersonal and impartial but fail ("Anyone Would Love You"). Destry then meets up with Wash and indirectly reveals that he's in love ("Once Knew a Fella"). Then Destry shows Wash important papers that Sheriff Keogh had left behind, saying he's got a plan to catch the culprit tonight. The town then celebrates their "every once in a while" ("Every Once in a While").

The saloon is packed and Frenchy performs a song ("Fair Warning"). Destry whispers to Wash to follow Gyp Watson to see if he can lead them to the sheriff's body. Destry is then confronted by Kent, who tells Destry to stop investigating Keogh's disappearance. Destry refuses, hinting that he knows where the body is hidden. Kent then sends Gyp Watson to go and check if the body is still where they hid it. Wash follows Gyp and catches him red-handed with Sheriff Keogh's body. He arrests Gyp and tells Destry. Destry then announces to the town that Gyp Watson has been arrested for murder. Bugs Watson becomes furious, claiming that his brother didn't kill Sheriff Keogh. Kent then sends Frenchy to announce that Mayor Slade will be trying Gyp's case and the jury will be made up of patrons of the Last Chance Saloon. Wash disappointedly hands Destry two pistols and walks away.

=== Act 2 ===
Destry leaves town to get a Federal Marshal, and Kent decides that a jail-break is the best way to keep Gyp from talking. Destry returns, but Wash is killed, and so Destry uses gunplay to stop the outlaws. A repentant Frenchy keeps Destry from being killed, and the two embrace at last. Destry and Frenchy plan to be married.

== Original cast and characters ==
| Character | Broadway (1959) |
|---|---|
| Frenchy | Dolores Gray |
| Destry | Andy Griffith |
| Kent | Scott Brady |
| Wash Dimsdale | Jack Prince |
| Chloe | Libi Staiger |
| Rose Lovejoy | Elizabeth Watts |
| Gyp Watson | Marc Breaux |
| Bugs Watson | Swen Swenson |
| Rockwell | George Reeder |
| Mayor Slade | Don McHenry |
| Clara | Rosetta LeNoire |

== Songs ==
Act 1

- Bottleneck - Patrons of the Last Chance Saloon
- Ladies - Frenchy and Girls
- Hoop-de-Dingle - Wash and Patrons of the Saloon
- Tomorrow Morning - Destry
- Ballad of the Gun - Destry and Wash
- The Social - Townspeople, Gyp Watson, Bugs Watson and Rockwell
- I Know Your Kind - Frenchy
- I Hate Him - Frenchy
- Paradise Alley - Cowboys and The Rose Lovely Girls
- Anyone Would Love You - Destry and Frenchy
- Once Knew a Fella - Destry, Wash and Friends
- Every Once in a While - Gyp Watson, Bugs Watson, Rockwell, Cowboys and Saloon Girls
- Fair Warning - Frenchy

Act 2

- Are You Ready, Gyp Watson?- Friends of Gyp Watson
- Not Guilty - The Jury
- Only Time Will Tell - Destry
- Respectability - Rose Lovejoy and Girls
- That Ring on the Finger - Frenchy and Girls
- Once Knew a Fella (Reprise) - Destry and Frenchy
- I Say Hello - Frenchy

== Awards and nominations ==
- Tony Award Best Actor in a Musical - Andy Griffith (nominee)
- Tony Award Best Actress in a Musical - Dolores Gray (nominee)
- Tony Award Best Choreography - Michael Kidd (winner)
- Tony Award Best Direction of a Musical - Michael Kidd (nominee)
