= Nakia Codie =

American football player (born 1977)

No. 24
- Position: Defensive back

Personal information
- Born: January 20, 1977 (age 49); Onslow County, North Carolina, U.S.
- Listed height: 6 ft 3 in (1.91 m)
- Listed weight: 208 lb (94 kg)

Career information
- High school: Cleburne (Cleburne, Texas)
- College: Baylor (1995–1998)
- NFL draft: 1999: undrafted

Career history
- Detroit Lions (1999)*; Pittsburgh Steelers (2000)
- * Offseason or practice squad member only
- Stats at Pro Football Reference

Nakia Yarbrough Codie (born January 20, 1977) is an American former professional football defensive back who played one season with the Pittsburgh Steelers of the National Football League (NFL). He played college football at Baylor University.

== Early life and college ==
Nakia Yarbrough Codie was born on January 20, 1977, in Onslow County, North Carolina. He attended Cleburne High School in Cleburne, Texas.

Codie was a four-year letterman for the Baylor Bears of Baylor University from 1995 to 1998.

== Professional career ==
After going undrafted in the 1999 NFL draft, Codie signed with the Detroit Lions on April 23. He was released on August 31, 1999.

Codie was signed by the Pittsburgh Steelers on April 4, 2000. He was released on August 22 and signed to the team's practice squad on August 29. He was promoted to the active roster on November 18 and played in six games for the Steelers during the 2000 season, recording one interception. Codie was released on August 27, 2001.

== Personal life ==
Codie later became a personal football trainer and also started his own football camp. He entered the financial industry after his NFL career, including a stint as a loss mitigation manager at Ally Financial Service.
