= Destry Rides Again (1932 film) =

1932 film

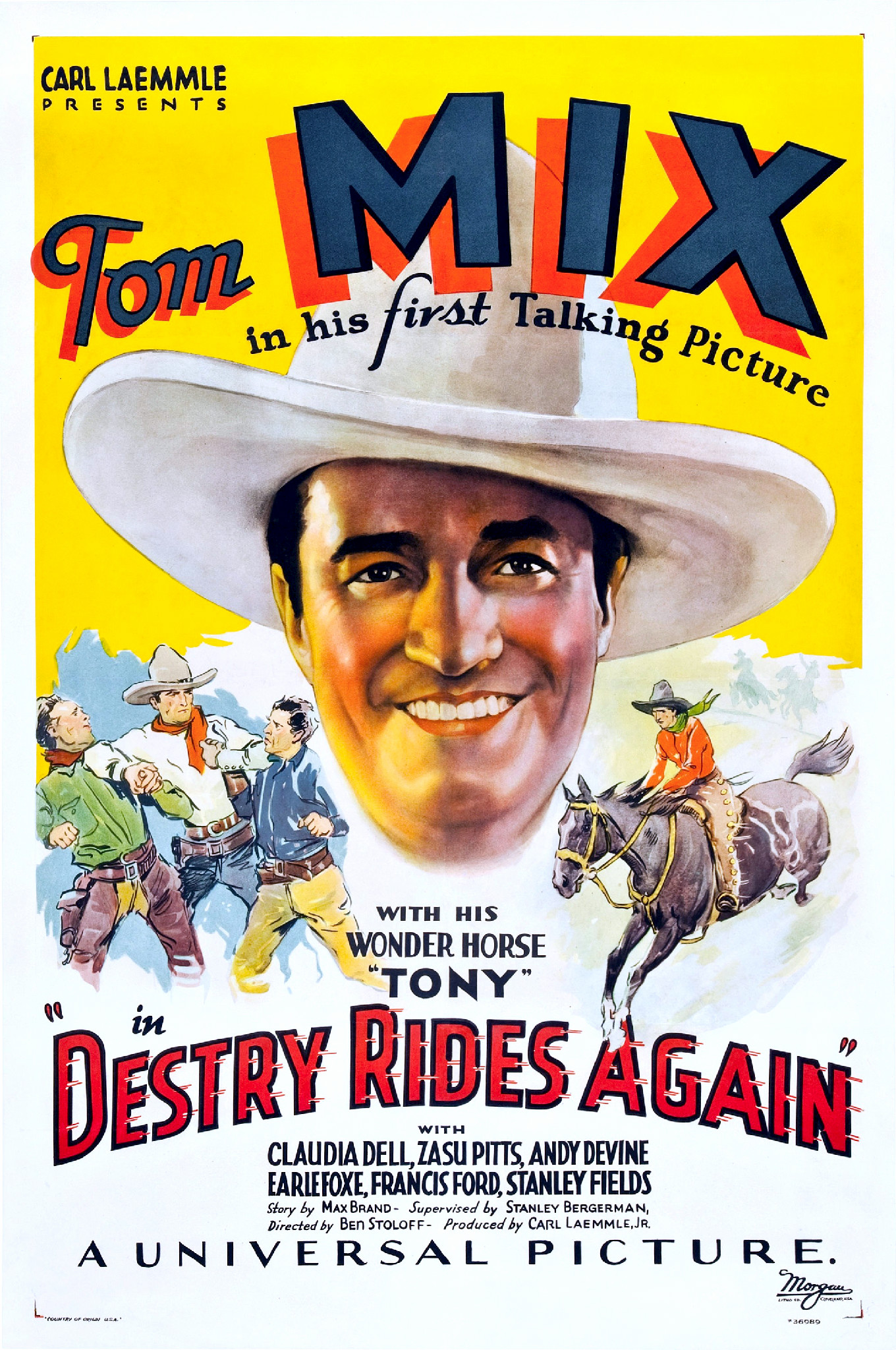
- film poster
- Directed by: Benjamin Stoloff (billed as Ben Stoloff)
- Written by: Richard Schayer (adaptation); Robert Keith (dialogue); Isadore Bernstein (continuity)
- Based on: Destry Rides Again 1930 novel by Max Brand
- Produced by: Carl Laemmle Jr. Stanley Bergerman
- Starring: Tom Mix; Claudia Dell; ZaSu Pitts
- Cinematography: Daniel B. Clark
- Edited by: Arthur Hilton
- Distributed by: Universal Pictures
- Release date: 1932
- Running time: 94 minutes
- Country: United States
- Language: English

Destry Rides Again is a 1932 American pre-Code Western movie starring Tom Mix and directed by Benjamin Stoloff. The film was based on a novel by Max Brand. The supporting cast includes Claudia Dell, ZaSu Pitts, and Francis Ford.

The film has sometimes been retitled Justice Rides Again for television broadcasts, to avoid confusion with the 1939 film of the same name, with Marlene Dietrich and James Stewart. The latter, however, shares only the title; it is a completely different story that has no connection with Max Brand's novel.

== Plot ==
A man is framed for a crime he didn't commit and returns to wreak havoc following his release from prison.

== Cast ==
- Tom Mix as Tom Destry
- Claudia Dell as Sally Dangerfield
- ZaSu Pitts as Temperance Worker
- Stanley Fields as Sheriff Jerry Wendell
- Earle Foxe as Tom Brent
- Edward Peil Sr. as Frank Warren
- Francis Ford as Judd Ogden
- Fred Howard as Edward Clifton
- George Ernest as Willie
- Edward LeSaint as Mr. Dangerfield
- Charles K. French as Jury Foreman
- Tony the Horse as Tony, Tom's Horse
- Andy Devine as Stage Passenger (scene deleted)
- Harry Tenbrook as Barfly (uncredited)
