= Destry Wright =

American football player (born 1977)

No. 34
- Position: Running back

Personal information
- Born: July 9, 1977 (age 49); Clarksdale, Mississippi
- Listed height: 6 ft 1 in (1.85 m)
- Listed weight: 230 lb (104 kg)

Career information
- College: Jackson State

Career history
- Pittsburgh Steelers (2000)

Destry "D-Train" Wright (born July 9, 1977) is a retired American football player.

At Jackson State University, Wright set the team's three-season career rushing record of 4,020 yards, running for 1,614 yards and scoring 12 touchdowns in his last season. Wright also held the record as the Southwestern Athletic Conference’s all-time leading rusher.

As an un-drafted free agent, Wright officially played one season with the Pittsburgh Steelers, though he was unable to play any regular-season games due to an injury suffered in a pre-season game against the Dallas Cowboys on July 30, 2000, in which Wright dislocated his right ankle and broke his right leg. The injury gained widespread publicity after an on-field photo was published that showed Wright's feet pointing in different directions.

He is now a middle school football coach at Cordova Middle School in Cordova, Tennessee.
