= Max Brand =

American writer (1892–1944)

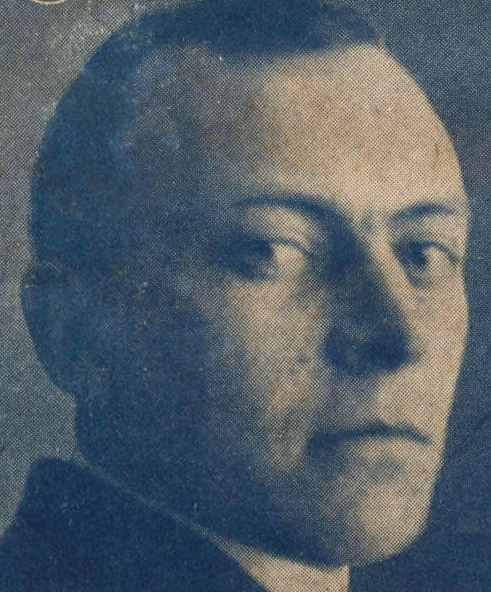
- Born: Frederick Schiller Faust; May 29, 1892; Seattle, Washington, United States
- Died: May 12, 1944 (aged 51); Minturno (Santa Maria Infante), Italy
- Resting place: Sicily–Rome American Cemetery and Memorial
- Education: University of California
- Occupations: Writer, author
- Spouse: Dorothy Schillig
- Relatives: Gilbert Leander Faust (father); Louisa Elizabeth (Uriel) Faust (mother)
- Writing career
- Pen name: Frank Austin; George Owen Baxter; Lee Bolt; Walter C. Butler; George Challis; Peter Dawson; Martin Dexter; Evin Evan; Evan Evans; John Frederick; Frederick Frost; Dennis Lawson; David Manning; M.B. Peter Henry Morland; Hugh Owen; Nicholas Silver
- Genre: Western

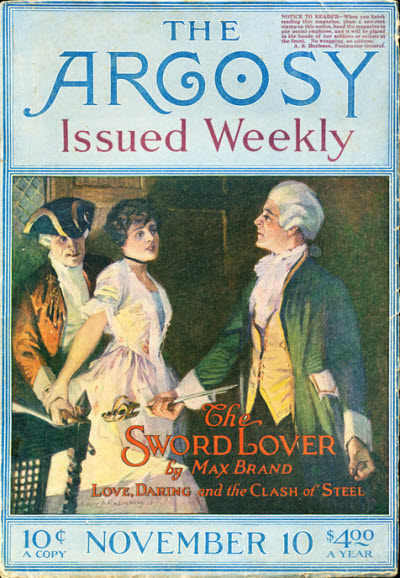
The "Max Brand" novel The Sword Lover was serialized in The Argosy during 1917.

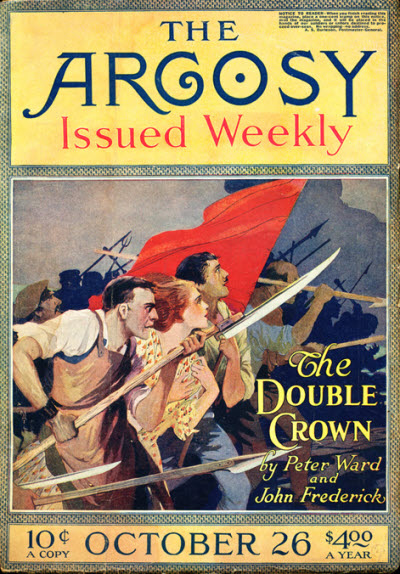
Faust's novel The Double Crown carried two of Faust's pen names when it was serialized in The Argosy during 1918.

Frederick Schiller Faust (May 29, 1892 – May 12, 1944) was an American writer known primarily for his Western stories using the pseudonym Max Brand. As Max Brand, he also created the popular fictional character of young medical intern Dr. James Kildare for a series of pulp fiction stories. His Kildare character was subsequently featured over several decades in other media, including a series of American theatrical movies by Paramount Pictures and Metro-Goldwyn-Mayer (MGM), a radio series, two television series, and comics. Faust's other pseudonyms include George Owen Baxter, Evan Evans, Peter Dawson, David Manning, John Frederick, Peter Henry Morland, George Challis, and Frederick Frost. He also wrote under his real name. As George Challis, Faust wrote the "Tizzo the Firebrand" series for Argosy magazine. The Tizzo saga was a series of historical swashbuckler stories, featuring the titular warrior, set in Renaissance Italy.

== Death ==
During early 1944, when Faust, Frank Gruber, and fellow author Steve Fisher were working at Warner Brothers, they often had idle conversations during afternoons, along with a Colonel Nee, who was a technical advisor sent from Washington, D.C. One day, charged with whiskey, Faust talked of getting assigned to a company of foot soldiers so he could experience the war and later write a war novel. Colonel Nee said he could fix it for him and some weeks later he did, getting Faust an assignment for Harper's Magazine as a war correspondent in Italy. While traveling with American soldiers fighting in Italy in 1944, Faust was wounded mortally by shrapnel.

== Titles and series ==
=== Dan Barry series ===
- The Untamed (1919)
- The Night Horseman (1920)
- The Seventh Man (1921)
- Dan Barry's Daughter (1923)

=== Ronicky Doone Trilogy ===
- Ronicky Doone (1921)
- Ronicky Doone's Treasures (1922)
- Ronicky Doone's Rewards (1922)

=== Silvertip series ===
- Silvertip (1941)
- The Man from Mustang (1942)
- Silvertip's Strike (1942)
- Silvertip's Roundup (1943)
- Silvertip's Trap (1943)
- The Fighting Four (1944)
- Silvertip's Chase (1944)
- Silvertip's Search (1945)
- The Stolen Stallion (1945)
- Valley Thieves (1946)
- Mountain Riders (1946)
- The Valley of Vanishing Men (1947)
- The False Rider (1947)

=== Dr. Kildare series ===
- Interns Can't Take Money (1936)
- Whiskey Sour (1938)
- Young Doctor Kildare (1938)
- Calling Dr. Kildare (1939)
- The Secret of Dr. Kildare (1939)
- Dr. Kildare's Girl and Dr. Kildare's Hardest Case (1940)
- Dr. Kildare Goes Home (1940)
- Dr. Kildare's Crisis (1941)
- The People vs. Dr. Kildare (1941)

=== Tizzo the Firebrand series ===
- The Firebrand (1934)
- The Great Betrayal (1935)
- The Storm (1935)
- The Cat and the Perfume (1935)
- Claws of the Tigress (1935)
- The Bait and the Trap (1935)
- The Pearls of Bonfadini (1935)

=== Other novels ===
- Above the Law (1918)
- Devil Ritter (1918)
- Harrigan! (1918)
- Riders of the Silences (1919)
- Trailin'! (1919)
- The Man Who Forgot Christmas (1920)
- The Ghost (The Ghost Rides Tonight!) (1920) [writing as Frederick Faust]
- Black Jack (1921)
- Bull Hunter (1921)
- Donnegan (Gunman's Reckoning) (1921)
- The Long, Long Trail (1921)
- Sheriff Larrabee's Prisoner (1921)
- A Shower of Silver (1921)
- Way of the Lawless (1921)
- Alcatraz (1922)
- Gun Gentlemen (1922)
- The Rangeland Avenger (1922)
- The Garden of Eden (1922)
- The Lost Valley (1922)
- Wild Freedom (1922)
- His Name His Fortune (1923) [writing as Frederick Faust]
- Outlaw Breed (1923)
- The Quest of Lee Garrison (1923)
- The Gold King Turns His Back (1923) [writing as John Frederick]
- Rodeo Ranch (1923)
- Rustlers of Beacon Creek (The Winged Horse) (1923)
- Soft Metal (1923)
- "Sunset" Wins (1923) [writing as George Owen Baxter]
- Timber Line (1923)
- Under His Shirt (1923)
- The Gambler (1924)
- The Tenderfoot (1924)
- The Smiling Desperado (1924)
- The Whispering Outlaw (a.k.a. The Whisperer of the Wilderness) (1924)
- The Brute (1925) [writing as David Manning]
- Jim Curry's Test (1925)
- The Black Rider (1925) [writing as George Owen Baxter]
- In the River Bottom's Grip (1925) [writing as David Manning]
- His Fight for Pardon (1925) [writing as George Owen Baxter]
- Acres of Unrest (1926)
- Fate's Honeymoon (1926)
- Fire-Brain (1926)
- Werewolf (1926)
- The Iron Trail (1926)
- The Outlaw Tamer (1926)
- The White Cheyenne (1926)
- Trouble Trail (1926)
- Pleasant Jim (1926)
- The Blue Jay (1926)
- Single Jack (1926, 1927)
- The Border Bandit (1926) [writing as Evan Evans]
- Sawdust and Sixguns (1927) [writing as Evan Evans]
- The Mountain Fugitive (1927)
- The Mustang Herder (1927)
- The Pride of Tyson (1927)
- Thunder Moon Strikes (1927)
- Border Guns (1928)
- Hunted Riders (1928)
- Pillar Mountain (1928)
- The Gun Tamer (1928)
- The Sheriff Rides (Silver Trail) (1928)
- Tragedy Trail (1928)
- Outlaw Valley (1928) [writing as Evan Evans]
- King of the Range (a.k.a. Strength of the Hills) (1929)
- Tiger Man (1929)
- The Seven of Diamonds (1929)
- Destry Rides Again (1930) (adapted to films of the same name in 1932 and 1939)
- Marbleface (a.k.a. Pokerface; The Tough Tender foot) (1930)
- Sixteen in Nome (1930)
- Strange Courage (1930) [writing as Evan Evans]
- The Hair-Trigger Kid (1931)
- The Killers (1931)
- Trouble Kid (1931)
- Lucky Larribee (1932)
- The Boy Who Found Christmas (1932)
- The Lightning Warrior (a.k.a. The White Wolf) (1932)
- Trail Partners (1932)
- The Two-Handed Man (1932)
- Gunman's Legacy (1932) [writing as Evan Evans]
- Outlaw's Code (1932) [writing as Evan Evans]
- Blood on the Trail (1933)
- Gunman's Gold (1933)
- Rider of the High Hill (1933)
- The King Bird Rides (Kingbird's Pursuit) (1933)
- The Red Bandanna (1933)
- The Stage to Yellow Creek (1933)
- The Whisperer: A Reata Story (1933) [writing as George Owen Baxter]
- Red Devil of the Range (a.k.a. The Red Pacer; Horseback Hellion; The Man from Savage Creek) (1933)
- Jingo: A Western Story (1933)
- Montana Rides! (1933) [writing as Evan Evans] (adapted into the film Branded (1950 film))
- Crooked Horn (1934)
- Cheyenne Gold (1935)
- Montana Rides Again (1935) [writing as Evan Evans]
- Six-Gun Country (1935)
- The Song of the Whip (1936) [writing as Evan Evans]
- Happy Jack (1936)
- Singing Guns (1938)
- The Dude (1940)
- Out of the Wilderness: A Western Story (2014, posthumously published)

Abdullah, Achmed; Brand, Max; Means, E.K.; Sheehan, Perley Poore (1920). The Ten Foot Chain: Can Love Survive the Shackles? — A Unique Symposium. New York: Reynolds Publishing Company.
