= MacKaye =

MacKaye is a surname and a given name. Notable people with the name include:

Surname:

- Abdelwahid Aboud Mackaye (born 1953), Chadian insurgent leader
- Alec MacKaye (born 1965), American singer and musician
- Benton MacKaye (1879–1975), American forester, planner and conservationist
- Hazel MacKaye (1880–1944), American theater professional, advocate of women's suffrage
- Ian MacKaye (born 1962), American musician
- James MacKaye (1872–1935), American engineer and philosopher
- Jessie Belle Hardy Stubbs MacKaye (1876–1921), American suffragist
- Jessie Mackaye (1879–1967), American comic stage actress
- Percy MacKaye (1875–1956), American dramatist and poet
- Steele MacKaye (1842–1894), American playwright, actor, theater manager and inventor

Given name:

- Anne MacKaye Chapman (1922–2010), Franco-American ethnologist

== See also ==
- Benton MacKaye Trail, a 300-mile footpath in the Appalachian Mountains
- Mackay
- McKay
- Floortje Mackaij (born 1995), Dutch racing cyclist
- Roy Makaay (born 1975), Dutch football coach and former player
