= Marie Moore Forrest =

Marie Henderson Moore Forrest (born Washington, DC, August 27, 1873; died Falls Church, Virginia, December 1, 1956) was an American writer and producer of pageants and other civic events and an advocate for women's rights.

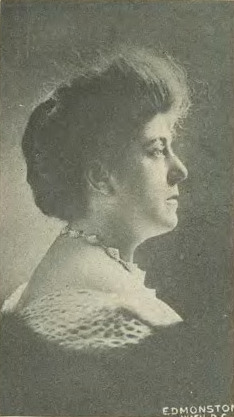
Forrest in the program of the 1913 Woman Suffrage Procession; she chaired the Office Hospitality Committee

== Early life ==
She was born Marie Henderson Moore to Commodore William Sturtevant Moore (1846-1914) and his wife Virginia Henderson Moore, daughter of artist and general Seth Eastman (1808-1875) and his wife Mary Henderson Eastman (1818-1887), a historian and novelist. Seth Eastman was a well-known figure in Washington; president Ulysses S. Grant and other prominent Washington figures attended his daughter Virginia's wedding reception on December 1, 1870. Marie attended Brook Hall in Media, Pennsylvania and then graduated from the American Academy of Dramatic Arts and studied in Europe.

== Career ==
By 1915 Forrest had begun involvement with pageantry, serving as assistant director to Hazel MacKaye on a pageant about Susan B. Anthony presented at the annual convention of the Congressional Union for Woman Suffrage. In 1916 she toured the nation presenting a pageant of her own, "The Bible Among the Nations". By 1918 Forrest held the position of director of community drama and pageantry in the District of Columbia schools, and in 1919 was described as being "nationally known for her work in pageantry".

In December 1918 Forrest was in charge of a Christmas celebration at the United States Capitol including a tree lighting, caroling, tableaux, and dancing. Starting in 1923 she worked with Lucretia Walker Hardy, head of the schools' Community Center department, on the annual National Christmas Tree celebration.

In 1921 Forrest directed a pageant on peace during the first week of the Washington Naval Conference. In 1924 she directed 600 members of the Catholic Students' Mission Crusade in a pageant titled "The Dreamer Awakes".

Forrest had a long connection with the National Woman's Party. Decades later Forrest spoke of being one of the Silent Sentinels picketing the White House in favor of women's suffrage. Forrest directed a pageant for the opening of the National Woman's Party headquarters in Washington on May 21, 1922. In 1933 she arranged the funeral service of Alva Belmont, president of the party. In 1939 she was in charge of arranging a Jubilee Year conference of the party. In 1950 she was still active as the chairman of the party's Committee of Pageantry and Drama.

== Family ==
She married Randolph Keith Forrest (1862-1930), an attorney, in 1910. They had one daughter, Henrietta Marie Thornhill (1911-1980).
