= Hazel MacKaye =

American theater professional

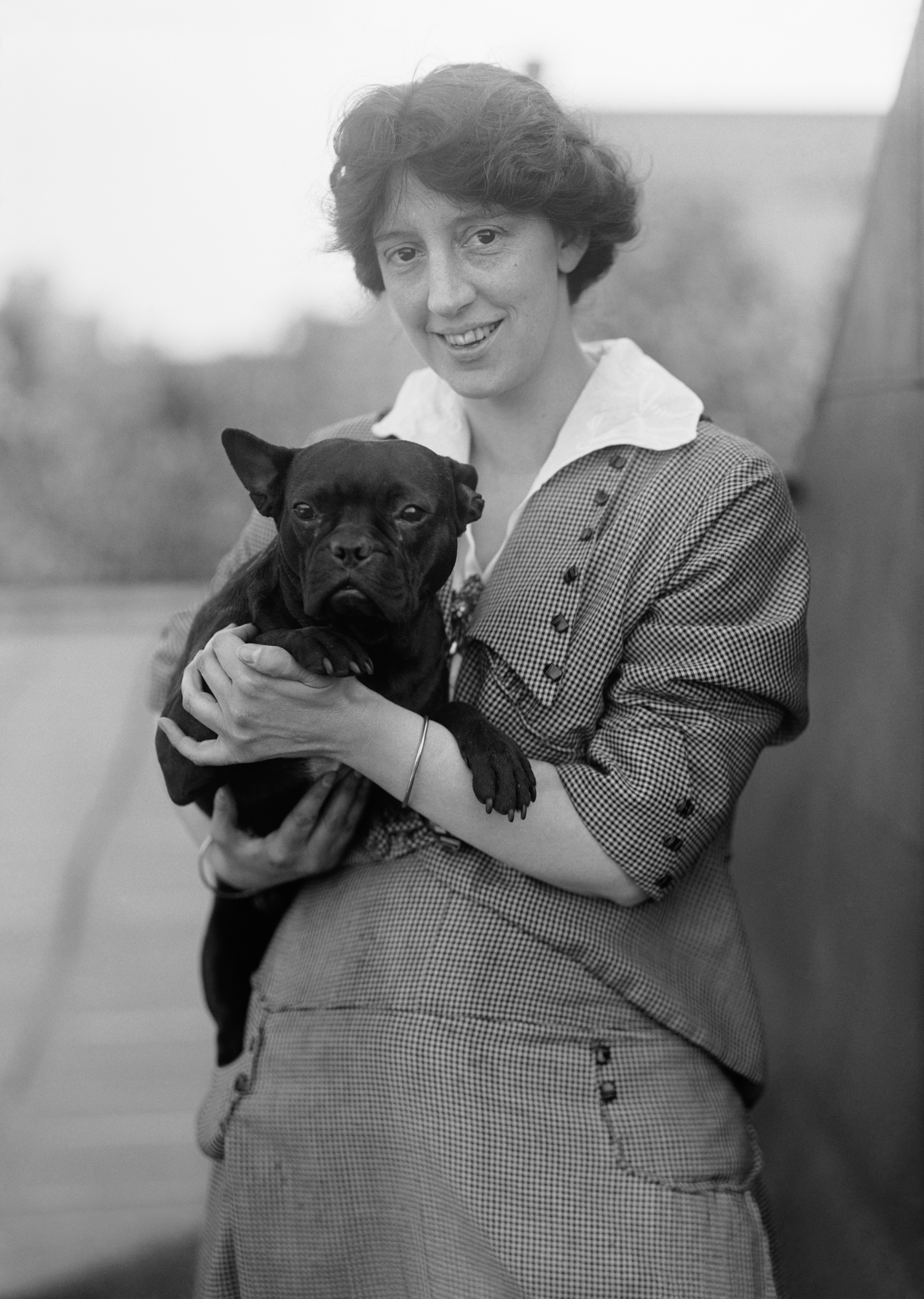
- MacKaye in 1915
- Born: August 24, 1880; New York City, U.S.
- Died: August 11, 1944 (aged 63); Westport, Connecticut, U.S.
- Occupations: Theater professional and suffragette

Hazel MacKaye (August 24, 1880 – August 11, 1944) was an American theater professional and advocate of women's suffrage. She is best known for helping present a series of pageants in support of women's suffrage.

== Family and early life ==
MacKaye was born into a prominent theatrical family. Her father Steele MacKaye (1842–1894) was a famous actor, playwright, and producer; Hazel was named after his hit play Hazel Kirke. Hazel's mother Mary Medbery MacKaye (1845–1924) wrote a popular adaption of Pride and Prejudice for the stage in 1906. Hazel's siblings included engineer and writer James MacKaye (1872–1935), dramatist and poet Percy MacKaye (1875–1956), and conservationist Benton MacKaye (1879–1975). The family settled in Shirley, Massachusetts, in 1888.

MacKaye first intended to be a concert pianist, but in 1907, she enrolled in Radcliffe College theater classes taught by George Pierce Baker. She failed to graduate but was made an honorary member of the 1910 class. After leaving Radcliffe MacKaye worked as an assistant on various pageant productions, including several with her older brother Percy. She was a charter member of the American Pageant Association in 1913 and wrote a "Who's Who" of the members.

MacKaye also acted, touring with the Castle Square theater company of Winthrop Ames and appearing in her brother's Sappho and Phaon and Jeanne D'Arc (both 1907) and Mater (1908). She worked as an instructor at the Children's Educational Theatre in New York City.

== Career ==
MacKaye was active in the woman suffrage movement, being present at the first meeting of Alice Paul's Congressional Committee of the National American Woman Suffrage Association, forerunner of the Congressional Union for Woman Suffrage and the National Woman's Party. The organizers of the Woman Suffrage Procession, planned for Washington, D.C., on March 3, 1913, just before Woodrow Wilson's inauguration, asked MacKaye to create a pageant for the event. Titled Allegory and produced by director Glenna Smith Tinnin, it was presented on the steps of the U.S. Treasury Building as the culmination of the event. The pageant was praised as "one of the most impressively beautiful spectacles ever staged in this country" in The New York Times. Later that year, MacKaye and Tinnin collaborated again, creating the pageant Uncle Sam's 137th Birthday Party to celebrate Independence Day on July 4, 1913. The pageant, held on the National Mall, involved 2,000 children and 200 adults.

Her 1914 production with collaborators Bertha Remick and James E. Beggs, "The American Woman: Six Periods of American Life" was presented by the New York City Men's League for Women's Suffrage. It included “historical scenes to expose the specific economic, political, and social oppressions of American women". It was not a popular success. Her 1915 production Susan B. Anthony, presented at Convention Hall in Washington, D.C. in association with the annual convention of the Congressional Union for Woman Suffrage, was more successful, raising money for the organization and celebrating the life of the great early leader of women's suffrage. These productions were huge enterprises, involving hundreds of participants.

In 1916, MacKaye staged a "Jubilee Pageant" for the National Young Women's Christian Association. By 1919 MacKaye was serving as Director of Pageantry and Drama for the organization. While with the YWCA MacKaye wrote a number of pageants for their use.

In 1921, MacKaye and Marie Moore Forrest were in charge of the ceremony for the presentation of Adelaide Johnson's "Portrait Monument to Lucretia Mott, Elizabeth Cady Stanton, and Susan B. Anthony" to the U.S. Capitol.

MacKaye produced another pageant in 1923 celebrating the 75th anniversary of the Seneca Falls Convention, in the Garden of the Gods park in Colorado Springs, Colorado. The pageant was intended to promote the National Woman's Party's effort to pass the Equal Rights Amendment.

MacKaye wrote "The Enchanted Urn", a fantasy pantomime, in 1924. Her pageant "The Quest of Youth" was published by the Department of the Interior, Bureau of Education in 1924.

From 1923 to 1926, MacKaye taught drama at Brookwood Labor College in Katonah, New York. In 1926, she left to work with the United Mine Workers in Illinois, where her class in labor drama spawned a traveling ensemble.

== Death ==
By the mid-1920s, MacKaye was in declining health and was living with her brother Benton in Shirley. In 1928, she had a nervous breakdown and entered Gould Farm, a rest home in Great Barrington, Massachusetts. In 1937, her condition worsened and she was moved to a facility in Greens Farms, Connecticut. She had episodes of severe depression for much of the rest of her life. She died in 1944, and was buried in the Center Cemetery in Shirley; her brother Benton was buried nearby decades later.
