= Bertha Remick =

Bertha Remick (15 December 1872 - 14 July 1965) was an American artist, composer, music educator, and pianist. She sometimes published under the pseudonym Sybil Paget.

Remick was born in Chelsea, Massachusetts, to Anna L. and Henry T. Remick. Her father was a singer; her mother was a pianist and teacher. Her uncle Edward T. Remick was a composer and choirmaster.

Remick studied music in Boston with John Wheeler Tufts and in Dresden with Pittrich (not further identified; possibly Georg Pittrich or Carl Pittrich). She also studied music in New York for five years.

Remick was interested in American Indian music and gave lecture recitals on world folk music. She taught at the Florence Fleming Noyes School of Rhythmic Expression in Boston, Massachusetts. In the summer of 1915, she taught a course on the psychological value and recognition of music through rhythm at the school's summer session in South Woodstock, Connecticut.

In addition to composing original music, Remick arranged the works of other composers, frequently collaborating with other musicians. With B. R. Sharon, she arranged songs from Wagner's Tannhäuser and Die Meistersinger, and with David Stevens, she arranged songs from Bizet's Carmen, all for use by school choruses.

Although she never formally studied art, Remick's paintings were shown in Boston in 1919 and in 1939 at Morton Galleries in New York.

Some of Remick's music is in the collection of the Boston Public Library. Several of her songs were included in The Progressive Music Series by Horatio William Parker and in Primary Melodies by Elbridge Ward Newton. Her compositions were published by C. C. Birchard and Co., G. Schirmer Inc., J. G. Seeling, and Oliver Ditson. Her works included:

== Musical theater ==
- Enchanted Forest (with Florence Fleming Noyes)
- Magic Pipes of Pan (with Florence Fleming Noyes)
- Masque (with Florence Fleming Noyes)
- Nine Muses
- Suffrage Pageant (with Hazel MacKaye and James E. Beggs

== Piano ==
- Fairy Tale
- Romance

== Rhythm Band ==
- Come Join the Dance (by Alphons Czibulka; arranged by J. Lilian Vandevere and Bertha Remick)

== Vocal ==
- “A Mistake”
- “Anchored” (music by Michael Watson; text by Samuel K. Cowan; arranged by Bertha Remick)
- “Blind Man’s Bluff”
- “Bunny”
- “Caterpillar and the Bee”
- “Im Fruehling”
- “In My Love’s Garden” (song cycle)
- “Irish Girl’s Song”
- “Mother o’ Mine” (text by Rudyard Kipling)
- “O Captain! My Captain!”
- “Ragman”
- “Scissors Grinder”
- “Ten Thousand Eyes”
- “Umbrella Man”
- “Zwei Lieder”
