= Glenna Smith Tinnin =

American suffragist (1877–1945)

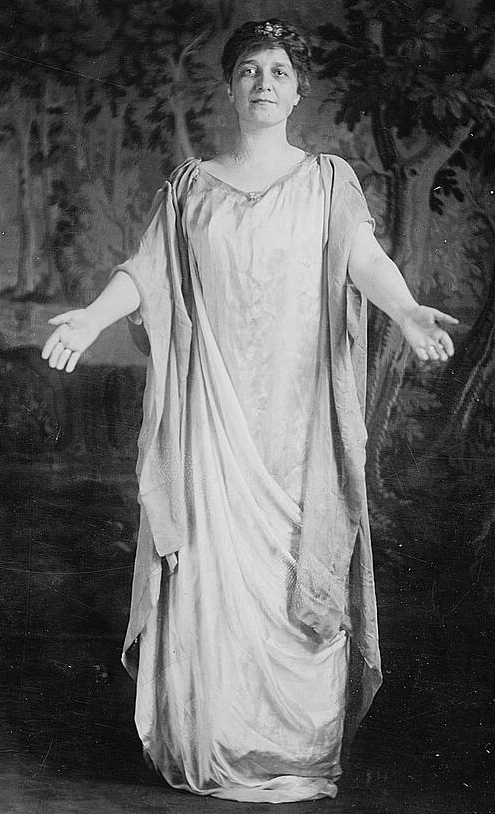
- Glenna Smith Tinnin circa 1913
- Born: February 27, 1877
- Died: March 24, 1945 (aged 68)

Glenna Smith Tinnin (February 27, 1877 – March 24, 1945) was an American suffragist and the first chairman of the District of Columbia Equal Franchise League. The Equal Franchise League was founded in 1914 as The Woman Suffrage Council. Early in her career Tinnin was an instructor in oratory at various institutes in the upper Midwest. She was a theater director and playwright, and served as chairman of the pageant committee of the American Federation of Arts. She wrote several plays for children (with Katharine S. Brown) including One Night in Bethlehem: A Play of the Nativity (1925) and Arthur Wins the Sword (1928) In December 1931 Tinnin and Brown staged a production of Paul Kester's Tom Sawyer on Broadway at the Alvin Theatre, which closed after 6 performances.

== Biography ==
She was born in Illinois on February 27, 1877. In 1897 she graduated from the Columbia School of Oratory in Chicago. By 1905 she was married to David Solomon Tinnin (1878–1918) of North Carolina; in 1910 they were living in Washington, DC. Smith Tinnin was an active member of the Washington Center of the Drama League of America. In 1913, she collaborated with Hazel MacKaye to create the pageant Allegory held on steps of the U.S. Treasury Building as part of the Woman Suffrage Procession, a large suffrage demonstration held the day before the inauguration of Woodrow Wilson. Later that year, they collaborated again, creating the pageant Uncle Sam's 137th Birthday Party to celebrate Independence Day on July 4, 1913. The pageant, held on the National Mall, involved 2,000 children and 200 adults. The success of that pageant led Smith Tinnin and other members of the Washington Drama League to open a children's theatre in Washington, D.C. The House of Play operated for two years with Glenna Smith Tinnin as its director. She died on March 24, 1945, in Chestnut Hill, Massachusetts.
