= Won at Last =

1877 play by Steele MacKaye

Won at Last is a five-act comedy by American dramatist Steele MacKaye. The play was written and set in 1877.

== Cast ==
- John Fleming, a man of the world
- Professor Tracy, a man of science
- Will Tracy, his son, a young sea-captain
- Dr. Sterling, a man of fact
- Major Bunker, a confiding husband
- Baron von Spiegel, one who knows
- Captain Maudle
- A Sailor
- Mr. Toddypop
- Mr. Mockem
- Mr. Tenderhug
- Robert, Fleming's Valet
- Grace Fleming, a true woman
- Mrs. Tracy, the professor's wife
- Sophy Bunker, a French adventuress
- Flora Fitzgiggle, a faded flower
- Mrs. Jones
- Mrs. Smith
- Polly Fickle
- Becky Stingall
- Miss Lovewild
- Jane McCarthy, a servant
- Lane, a servant
