= Jane Walker Burleson =

May Jane Walker Burleson
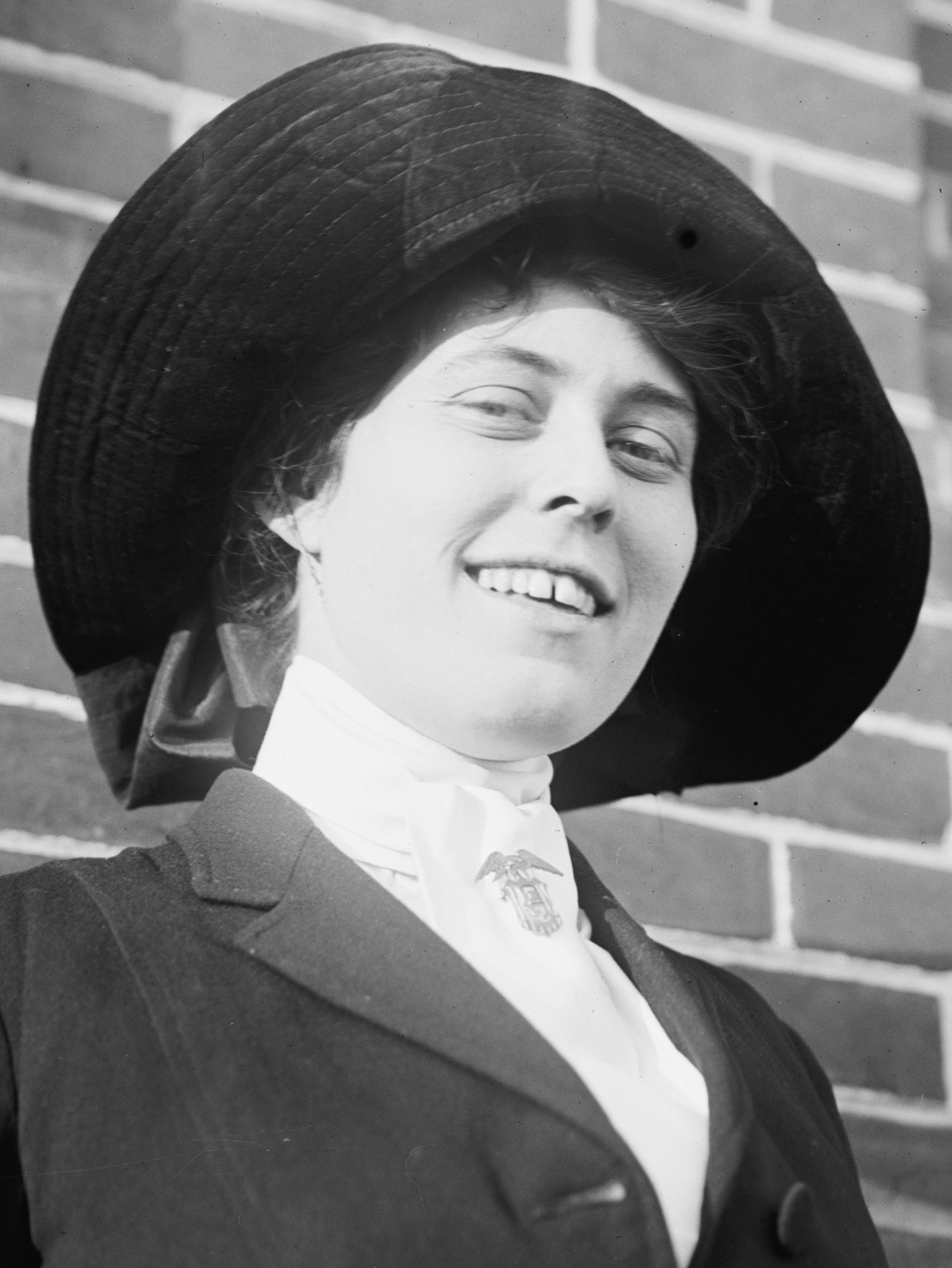
- Burleson in 1913
- Born: 1888; Galveston, Texas, US
- Died: 1957 (aged 68–69)
- Resting place: Glenwood Cemetery, Houston
- Movement: Women's suffrage
- Criminal charge: Voluntary manslaughter
- Criminal penalty: 12 years
- Spouse: Richard Coke Burleson (m.1908)

May Jane Walker Burleson (1888–1957), also known as Jennie May Burleson, was a notable socialite, artist, and Texan suffragette who was the grand marshal of the Woman Suffrage Parade of 1913 in Washington, DC. Mounted with confidence on her horse, she led a parade of 5,000 people up Pennsylvania Avenue, Washington, DC and "into a melee that changed the direction of the suffrage movement." During the 1930s her name was associated with scandal, attracting wide media attention in Texas, as she shot and killed the woman her husband married after their contentious divorce in 1938.

== Early life ==
Jane Walker was born and spent her early years in Galveston, Texas. Her parents John Caffery Walker (1849 - 1924) and Clara Waters Wilson Walker (1855 - 1937) had four children. Walker's father was a lawyer and judge from a prominent Texas family.

== Education ==
Burleson studied art in New York under the eminent painter William Chase and received her teaching certificate from Chase's normal school upon graduation. In 1914 she took courses at George Washington University in economics and sociology.

== Manila, Philippines ==
After her marriage in 1908 to Lieutenant Richard Coke Burleson (1881-1960) of the Third Field Artillery, they were ordered to Manila. With her teacher's certificate from Chase's normal school, she worked as supervisor in Manila public school system for two years where she trained and supervised five hundred teachers who in turn taught "thousands of children."

== Washington, DC ==
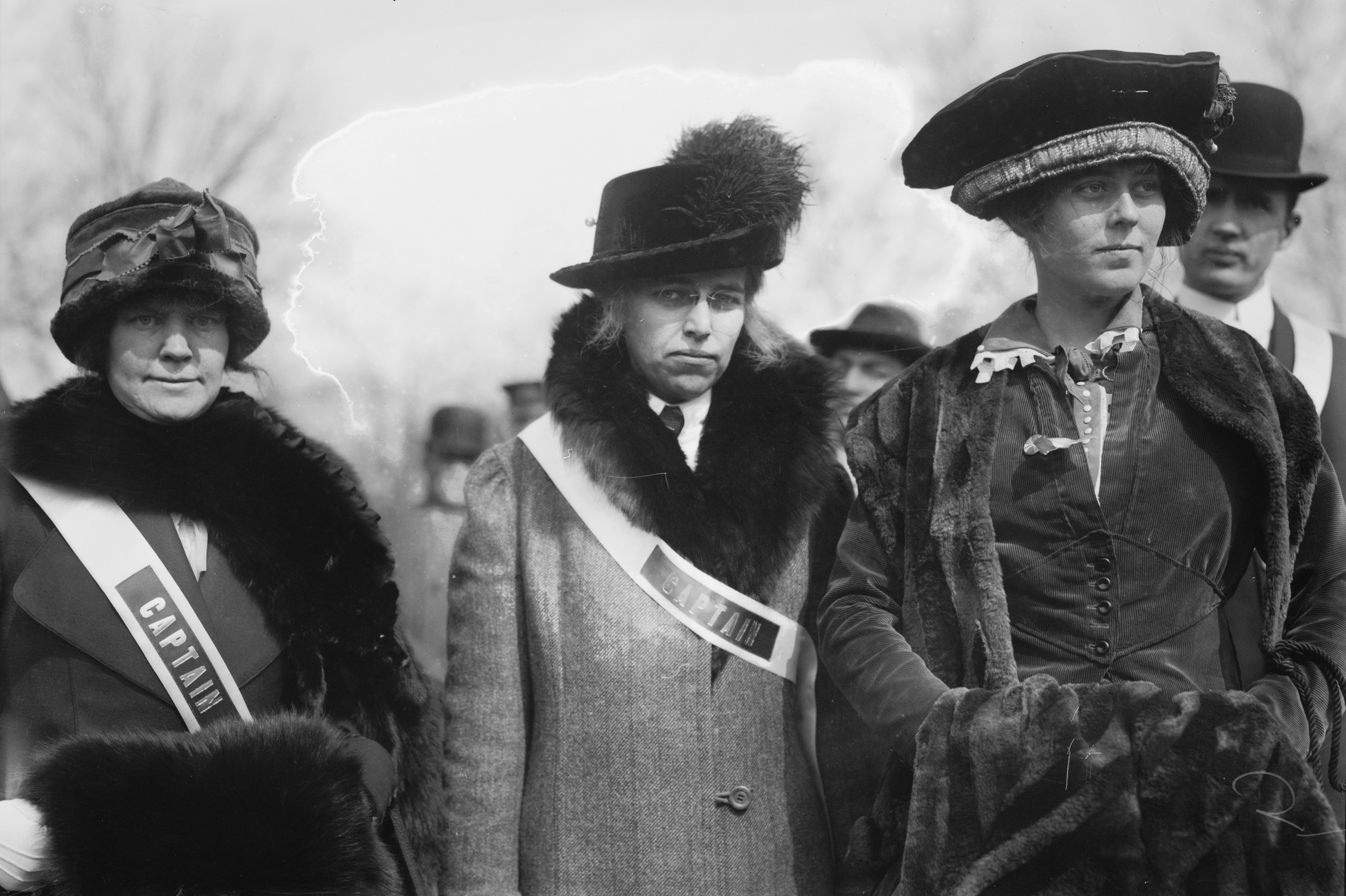
Suffrage parade - Mrs. Mary Bair, Mr(s). W. Albert Wood, and Mrs. R.S. (i.e., Richard Coke) Burleson LOC 2616374812

Upon their return to the United States, Lieutenant Burleson was stationed at Fort Myer just out of Washington, DC. In Washington, she joined the short-lived Congressional Union for Woman Suffrage association which was founded in 1913 by Alice Paul and Lucy Burns to campaign for a constitutional amendment guaranteeing women's suffrage Burleson was the grand marshal of the Woman Suffrage Parade of 1913 in Washington, DC.

She was featured in a February 1914 article in the Meriden Morning Record under the heading "Women Worth While." She was described as a "handsome young wife" who "was one of the most accomplished women in the army and navy circles in Washington, DC- an expert swimmer and diver who played golf, tennis and could "ride the most spirited mount."

Burleson's husband served overseas during World War I, commanding the 107th Regiment of the 53rd Field Artillery Brigade in Belgium. He advanced to the rank of colonel and received several medals for his service.

== Controversies ==
Her husband filed for divorce in 1935 and the case was heard in the District Court of San Saba County in November 1936 with his appeal for divorce being denied. In April 1937, attorneys allegedly acting on behalf of Jennie May Burleson "filed a cross action for divorce," which resulted in a divorce. However, Jennie Burleson alleged that she had not authorized the cross action suit. On September 27, 1937, Jennie May Burleson filed a "voluminous" report to have the April 1937 divorce judgment retracted "because the defense of insanity was not set up in some manner as against either spouse obtaining a divorce; and charged her attorneys with fraud, collusion, and misrepresentation in filing her cross action for divorce, knowing her nervous and mental state, and in not securing an order of the court to place her under "observation and a judgment as to her sanity before submitting to a trial." Her submission was dismissed by Justice Blair. The divorce made headlines in the media as a society scandal.

== Incarceration ==
In 1940, Burleson was again on the front pages of American newspapers for the murder of Isabelle Burleson, the woman Richard Burleson married immediately after their divorce was granted. Jennie Burleson traveled by train from Texas to Columbia, South Carolina, sought out Mrs. Burleson at a restaurant she frequented, and shot her twice. The jury found her guilty of voluntary manslaughter by reason of insanity and she was sentenced to twelve years. In October 1948, she was released having served eight years in prison in South Carolina and she returned to the Walker family home.
