= Benton MacKaye =

American forester and conservationist (1879 – 1975)

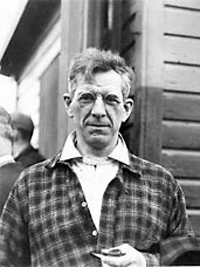
- Born: March 6, 1879; Stamford, Connecticut, U.S.
- Died: December 11, 1975 (aged 96); Shirley, Massachusetts, U.S.
- Education: Harvard University
- Occupations: Forester; conservationist; writer; educator
- Spouse: Jessie Belle Hardy Stubbs MacKaye (m. 1915–1921) (her death)

Benton MacKaye (/məˈkaɪ/ mə-KY; March 6, 1879 – December 11, 1975) was an American forester, planner and conservationist. He was born in Stamford, Connecticut; his father was actor and dramatist Steele MacKaye. After studying forestry at Harvard University, Benton taught there for several years. He held positions in the U.S. Forest Service, the Tennessee Valley Authority, and the U.S. Department of Labor; he was also a member of the Technical Alliance where he participated in the Energy Survey of North America.

MacKaye helped pioneer the idea of land preservation for recreation and conservation purposes and was a strong advocate of balancing human needs and those of nature; he coined the term "geotechnics" to describe this philosophy. In addition to writing the first argument against urban sprawl, MacKaye also authored two books, The New Exploration: A Philosophy of Regional Planning and Expedition Nine: A Return to a Region. Thirteen of his essays were published in the collection From Geography to Geotechnics. A co-founder of The Wilderness Society, he is best known as the originator of the Appalachian Trail, an idea he presented in his 1921 journal article entitled "An Appalachian Trail: A Project in Regional Planning." The Benton MacKaye Trail, some portions of which coincide with the Appalachian Trail, is named after him.

== Early life ==
Emile Benton MacKaye was born in Stamford, Connecticut, on March 6, 1879, to actor and dramatist Steele MacKaye and his wife Mary. He was the sixth of seven children (and last son) born to the couple. His siblings were Arthur Loring MacKaye (1863–1939), Harold (Hal) Steele (1866–1928), William Payson (1868–1889), James (Jamie) Medbery (1872–1935), Percy (1875–1956), and Hazel (1880–1944). Benton's name was derived from his paternal grandmother, Emily Benton Steele. The family often suffered from financial troubles because of the patriarch's numerous failed business ventures; although the Stamford home where Benton was born and where the family had lived since 1875 was a comfortable one, in late 1879 the family began a restless series of moves due to lack of funds. They lived in farms and houses in Brattleboro, Vermont; Norton, Massachusetts; Mount Vernon, New York; and Ridgefield, Connecticut, before moving to New York City in 1885.

In order to escape the bustle of city life, the family took to visiting Shirley Center, Massachusetts, a quiet village 30 miles from Boston that Benton would continue to visit throughout his life. In 1888, his brother William purchased an estate in Shirley that the family would come to call "The Cottage". Eight-year-old Benton was enamored with the beauty and freedom of the country, proclaiming he enjoyed it far more than urban existence. Shortly after William died of a sudden respiratory disease in 1889, the family moved to Washington, D.C. An indifferent student, MacKaye once described school as "a place that boys like to run away from". Drawn to the study of the natural world, he often pursued knowledge on his own; he spent much time in the Smithsonian, making sketches of the abundant collections and volunteering to help scientists in their labs. He befriended assistant curator James Benedict and attended lectures given by Civil War hero John Wesley Powell and arctic explorer Robert Peary.

His early immersion in nature helped him cope with tragedy that eventually struck the MacKaye family; his frequently absent father died in 1894, when Benton was fourteen. While attending high school in Cambridge, he began charting the landscape around Shirley Center, documenting vegetation, landforms, rivers, and roads in numbered notebooks. Lewis Mumford, a close friend of MacKaye and his future biographer, wrote that "This direct, first-hand education through the senses and feelings, with its deliberate observation of nature in every guise—including the human animal—has nourished MacKaye all his life."

== Harvard and forestry ==
After dropping out of school in order to prepare for college entrance exams on his own, in 1896 MacKaye followed his brothers—James, an engineer and philosopher, and Percy, a dramatist and poet—to Harvard University, where he studied geology. It took him two years to overcome deficiencies in subjects such as German, algebra and physics. When he graduated with a Bachelor of Arts in 1905, MacKaye was still unsure what career he should embark upon. During this time, he read Thomas Henry Huxley's 1877 work Physiography: An Introduction to the Study of Nature—a gift from his brother James and a work that would prove influential in MacKaye's future regional planning. In 1903 he enrolled in Harvard's newly established forestry school; he was the school's first student to graduate in 1905. For the next five years, he alternated between teaching at Harvard's forestry school near Petersham, Massachusetts, and working as a forest assistant with the United States Forest Service.

MacKaye made some important contributions during the early years of national forestry. While working as a forest examiner in the 1910s, he performed groundbreaking research on the impacts of forest cover on surface runoff in New Hampshire's White Mountains. This was during a time in which an intense debate regarding the connection between deforestation and irregular streamflow was occurring, and MacKaye's scientific evidence that forest cover controlled streamflow helped in the creation of the White Mountain National Forest.

In 1913, while living in Washington D.C., Mackaye helped form a social activist group called the Hell Raisers. Composed of government workers, congressional staffers, and journalists, the informal group aimed to raise public awareness about social and political issues. He married the suffragist Jessie Belle Hardy Stubbs in 1915.

== Hiking trails ==
MacKaye's article "An Appalachian Trail: A Project in Regional Planning," which proposed the construction of the Appalachian Trail, was published in the October 1921 issue of Journal of the American Institute of Architects. The article was partly inspired by the Green Mountain Club which had helped usher in Vermont's Long Trail. The article triggered sixteen years of effort, organized through hundreds of local trail associations and community groups, to blaze and build a 2,192-mile trail along the crests of the Appalachian Mountains.

The Pinhoti National Recreation Trail is considered the realization of MacKaye's original 1921 vision of a trail extending the length of the Appalachian Mountain chain, connecting several existing trails and sprinkled with permanent camps to "stimulate every line of outdoor non-industrial endeavor," including recreation, recuperation, agriculture and study. MacKaye hoped to spark a "back to the land" movement to relieve the ills of urban industrial life.

== Legacy ==
In his 2002 book Long Trails of the Southeast, writer and avid hiker Johnny Molloy wrote that the Benton MacKaye Trail "is what I imagine the Appalachian Trail was like many decades ago—a lesser tamed path, steep in places, rough in spots, and still evolving".

On June 17, 2011 he was inducted into the Appalachian Trail Hall of Fame at the Appalachian Trail Museum as a charter member.
