= Percy MacKaye =

American poet (1876–1956)

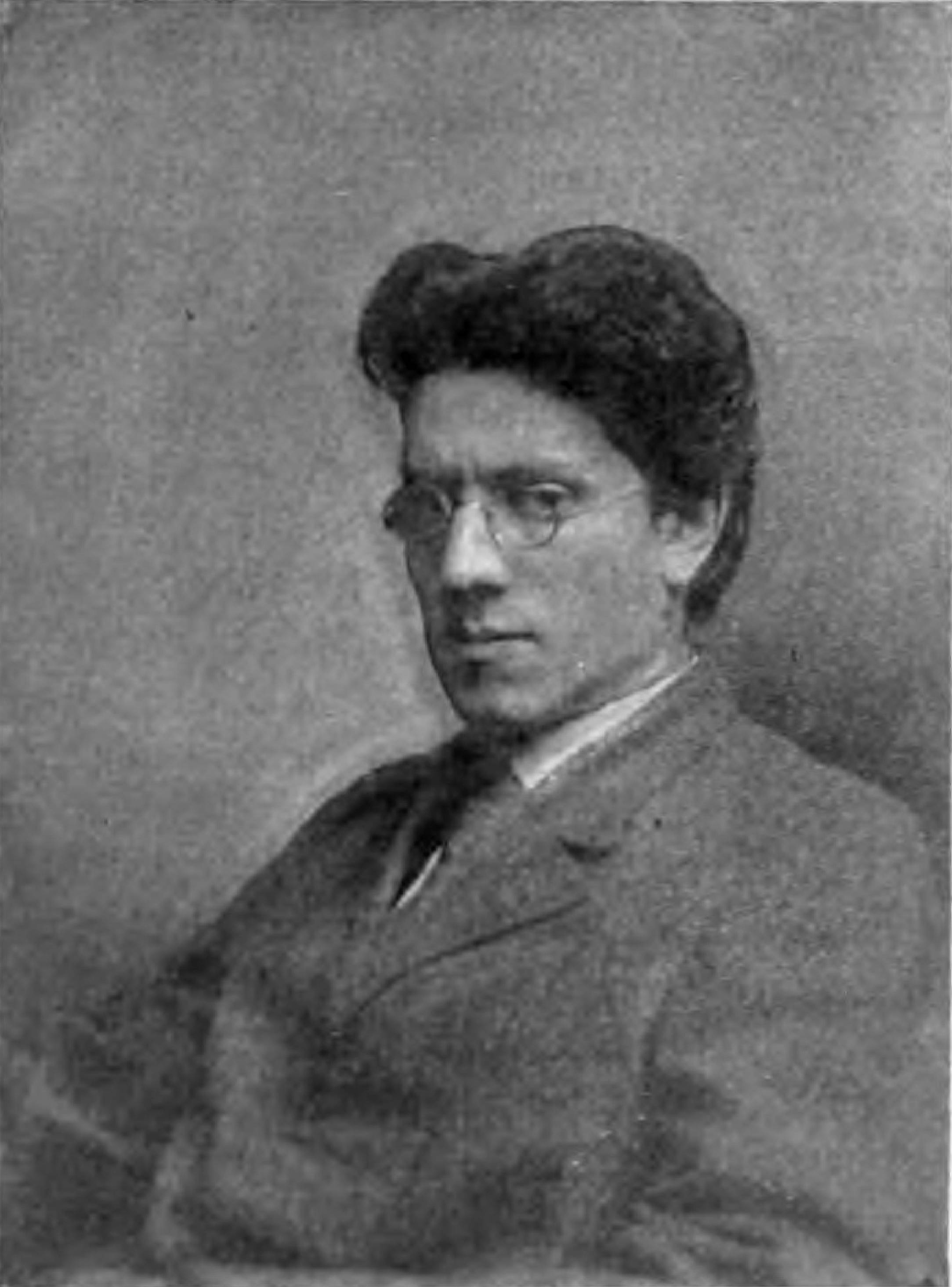
Percy MacKaye

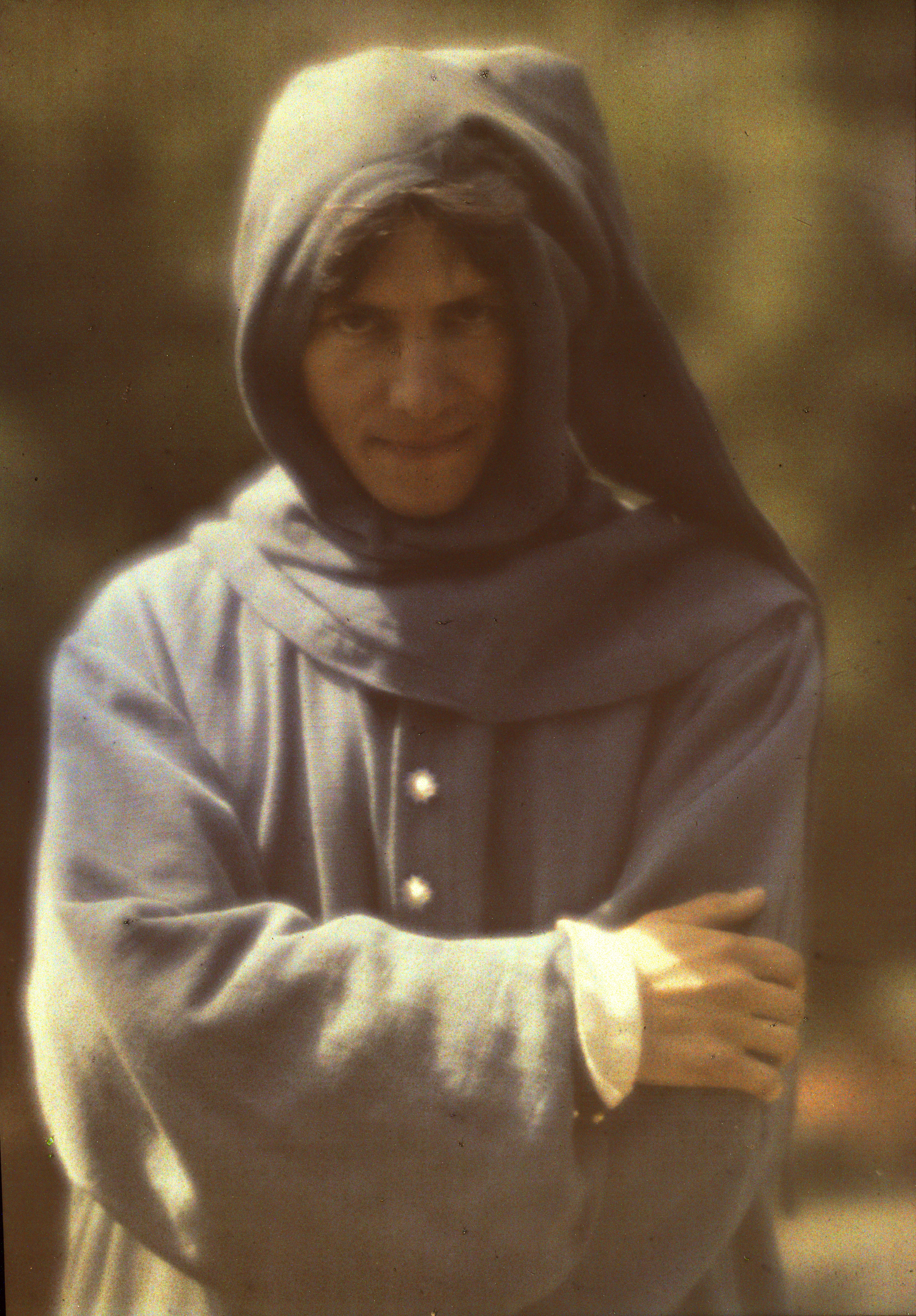
Percy MacKaye as Alwyn the poet in MacKaye's play Sanctuary: A Bird Masque. Photographed in 1913 by Arnold Genthe.

Percy MacKaye (1875–1956) was an American dramatist and poet.

== Biography ==
MacKaye was born in New York City into a theatrical family. His father, Steele MacKaye, was a popular actor, playwright, and producer, while his mother, Mary, wrote a dramatization of Pride and Prejudice, first produced in 1910. His brother James MacKaye was a philosopher, while brother Benton MacKaye was a forester and conservationist. His sister, Hazel MacKaye, became a women's suffrage leader and pageant director.

After graduating from Harvard in 1897, he traveled in Europe for three years, residing in Rome, Switzerland and London, studying at the University of Leipzig in 1899–1900. He returned to New York City to teach at a private school until 1904, when he joined a colony of artists and writers in Cornish, New Hampshire, and devoted himself entirely to dramatic work.

He wrote the plays The Canterbury Pilgrims in 1903, Sappho and Phaon in 1907, Jeanne D'Arc in 1907, The Scarecrow in 1908, Anti-Matrimony in 1910, and the poetry collection The Far Familiar in 1937. In 1950, MacKaye published The Mystery of Hamlet King of Denmark, or What We Will, a series of four plays written as prequels to William Shakespeare's Hamlet. His sister Hazel acted in or helped produce several of his early works.

He was made a member of the National Institute of Arts and Letters in 1914. In the 1920s, MacKaye was poet in residence at Miami University in Oxford, Ohio. He lectured on the theatre at Harvard, Yale, Columbia and other universities in the United States.

Percy MacKaye is considered to be the first poet of the Atomic Era because of his sonnet "The Atomic Law," which was published in the Christmas 1945 issue of The Churchman.

== Civic Theatre ==
In 1912, he published The Civic Theatre in Relation to the Redemption of Leisure; A Book of Suggestions. Here he presented a concept of Civic Theatre as "the conscious awakening of the people to self-government in its leisure". To this end he called for the active involvement of the public, not merely as spectators, professional staff not dominated by commercial considerations and the elimination of private profit by endowment and public support. This idea is most apparent in his play Caliban by the Yellow Sands (1916). This concept was influential on Platon Kerzhentsev and the Soviet Proletcult Theatre movement.

== Works ==
=== Poetry ===
- MacKaye, Percy (1912). Uriel: and Other Poems. Houghton Mifflin company. "Percy MacKaye."
- MacKaye, Percy (1914). The Present Hour: A Book of Poems. The Macmillan Company. "Percy MacKaye."
- MacKaye, Percy (1915). The Sistine Eve: and Other Poems. The Macmillan company. "Percy MacKaye."
- The Far Familiar: Fifty New Poems. Richards. 1938.

=== Plays ===
- Beowulf: A Drama of Anglo-Saxon Legend, c. 1899 (unpublished; posthumously performed at Texas A&M University on September 22, 2016)
- The Canterbury Pilgrims, 1903. This comedy was produced by the Coburn Players in the open air at Harvard, Yale and other universities in 1909–13, and given as a civic pageant in honor of President Taft at Gloucester, Massachusetts, 4 August 1909.
- Fenris the Wolf, 1905
- MacKaye, Percy (1906). Jeanne D'Arc: A Drama. The Macmillan company. "Percy MacKaye." Produced by E. H. Sothern and Julia Marlowe in the United States and England.
- MacKaye, Percy (1907). Sappho and Phaon. The Macmillan company. "Percy MacKaye."
- MacKaye, Percy (1908). The Scarecrow: or, The Glass of Truth; a Tragedy of the Ludicrous. The Macmillan company. "Percy MacKaye."
- MacKaye, Percy (1908). Mater: An American Study in Comedy. The Macmillan company. "Percy MacKaye."
- MacKaye, Percy (1910). Anti-matrimony: A Satirical Comedy. Frederick A. Stokes Co. "Percy MacKaye." Produced and acted by Henrietta Crosman.
- MacKaye, Percy (1912). Yankee Fantasies: Five One-act Plays. Duffield & company. "Percy MacKaye."
- MacKaye, Percy (1912). To-morrow: A Play in Three Acts. Frederick A. Stokes Company. "Percy MacKaye."
- MacKaye, Percy (1914). A Thousand Years Ago: A Romance of the Orient. Doubleday. "Percy MacKaye."
- MacKaye, Percy (1914). Sanctuary: A Bird Masque. Frederick A. Stokes company. "Percy MacKaye." Produced for President Wilson at Meriden Bird Club Sanctuary, New Hampshire.
- MacKaye, Percy (1915). The Immigrants: a Lyric Drama. B. W. Huebsch. "Percy MacKaye."
- MacKaye, Percy (1916). Caliban by the Yellow Sands. Doubleday, Page & Company. "Percy MacKaye." A community masque to commemorate the Shakespeare Tercentenary.
- MacKaye, Percy (1917). The Evergreen Tree. D. Appleton and company. "Percy MacKaye."
- MacKaye, Percy (1919). Washington: the Man Who Made Us: ballad play. Knopf. "Percy MacKaye."
- The Pilgrim and the Book. 1920. A dramatic "Service" for celebrating the Pilgrim Centenary.
- An Arrant Knave & Other Plays. Princeton University Press. 1941.
- The Mystery of Hamlet, King of Denmark, Or. What We Will: A Tetralogy in Prologue to "The Tragicall Historie of Hamlet, Prince of Denmarke". J. Lane. 1952.
- MacKaye, Percy (2008). Jeanne D'Arc. READ BOOKS. ISBN 978-1-4437-7195-5.

=== Opera ===
- Reginald De Koven; Percy MacKaye (1916). The Canterbury Pilgrims: An Opera. The Macmillan company. "Percy MacKaye."
- Reginald De Koven; Percy MacKaye (1919). Rip Van Winkle: Folk-opera in Three Acts. G. Schirmer. "Percy MacKaye."

=== Non-fiction ===
- MacKaye, Percy (1912). The Civic Theatre in Relation to the Redemption of Leisure: A Book of Suggestions. M. Kennerly. "Percy MacKaye The Civic Theatre."
