= Steele MacKaye =

American playwright and inventor (1842–1894)

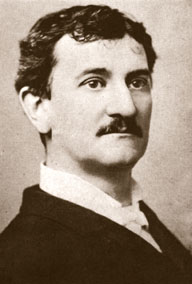
Portrait of MacKaye

James Morrison Steele MacKaye (/məˈkaɪ/ mə-KY; June 6, 1842 – February 25, 1894) was an American playwright, actor, theater manager and inventor. Having acted, written, directed and produced numerous and popular plays and theatrical spectaculars of the day, he became one of the most famous actors and theater producers of his generation.

== Biography ==
Steele MacKaye was born in Buffalo, New York. His father, Colonel James M. MacKaye, was a successful attorney and an ardent abolitionist; Steele's mother died when he was young. He had two sisters, Emily MacKaye von Hesse and Sarah MacKaye Warner, and two half-brothers, William Henry MacKaye and Henry Goodwin MacKaye. While young, Steele attended Roe's Military Academy in Cornwall-on-Hudson and the William Leverett Boarding School in Newport. Under the influence from his father, who was also an art connoisseur, MacKaye initially planned to become an artist. During his teens he studied painting with William Morris Hunt, then continued his studies at the École des Beaux Arts in Paris. He returned to the U.S. in order to serve for the Union Army during the American Civil War. A member of New York's Seventh Regiment, he eventually rose to the rank of Major before an illness forced his retirement. MacKaye would later model in full uniform for John Quincy Adams Ward's Seventh Regiment Memorial statue, which stands in Central Park.

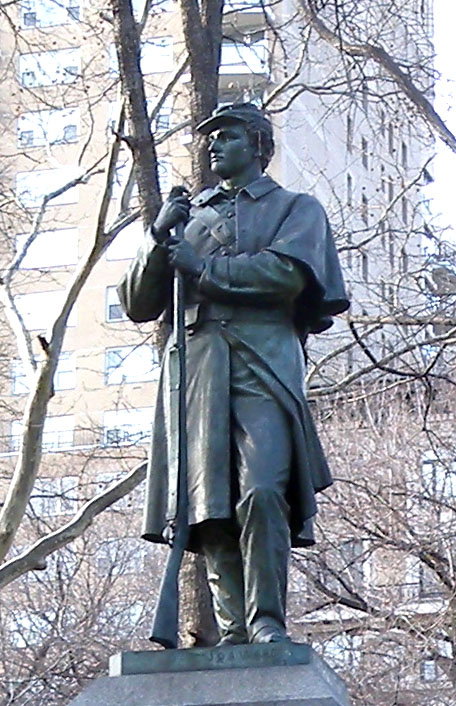
7th Regiment statue

In 1869, MacKaye traveled to Paris with his family, where he became the disciple of the renowned French acting teacher François Delsarte. Under Delsarte, MacKaye learned to enhance performance through pose and gesture. He would later teach and utilize this system during his career. On his return to the United States a year later, he lectured on the philosophy of ethics and "natural" acting in New York, Boston and elsewhere. In 1873 he became the first American actor to portray Hamlet in London.

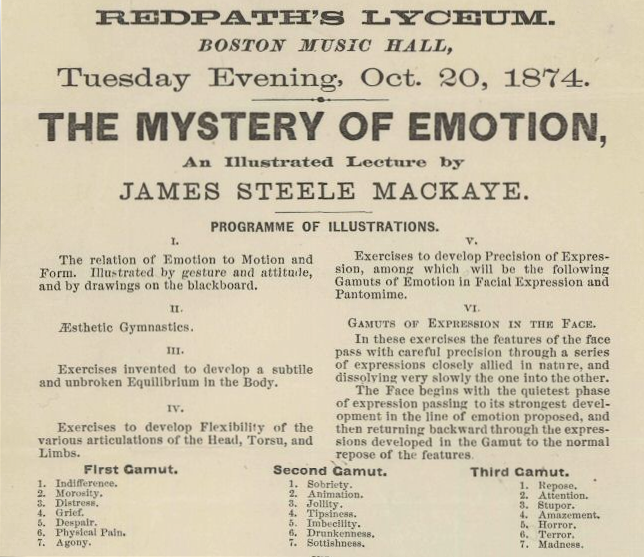
MacKaye's lecture on the Mystery of Emotion at the Boston Music Hall, 1874

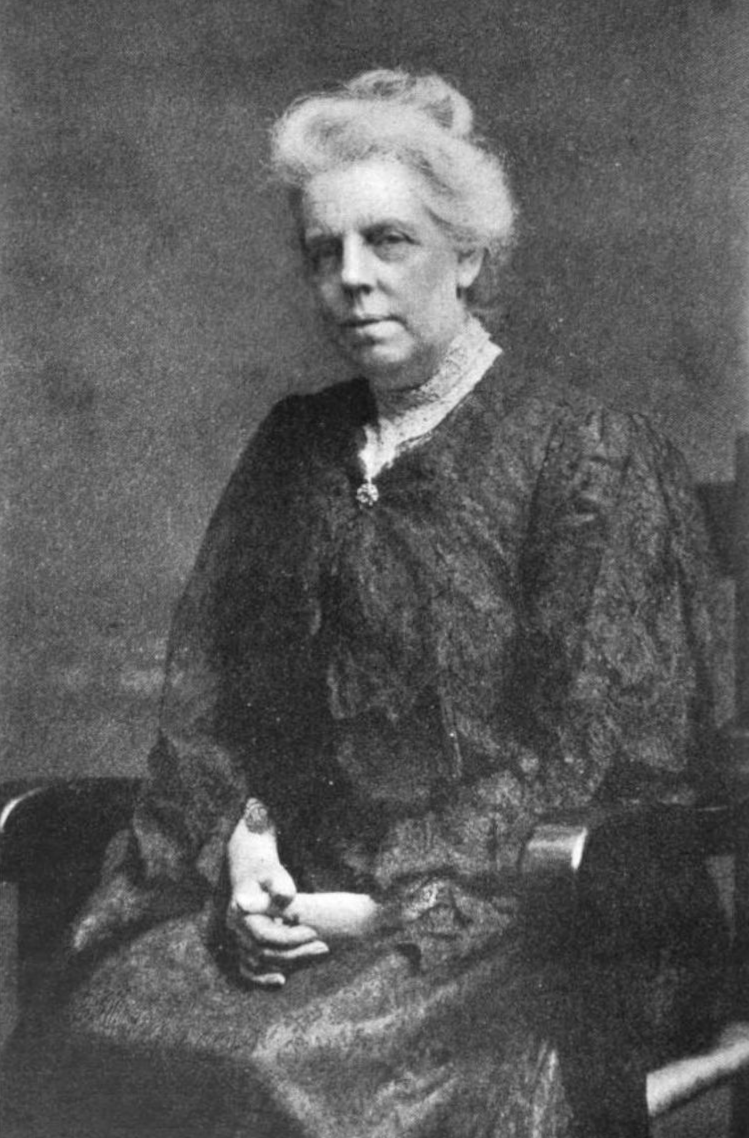
Mary K. MacKaye

MacKaye was the author of thirty plays. As a dramatist, MacKaye is seen as representative of the transition from an older theatrical tradition to a newer one, incorporating realism and naturalistic portrayals. His first play to be published was Hazel Kirke, which was privately printed in New York in 1880. The play, while a smash-hit with audiences, received neutral-to-negative response from theatre critics, who criticized its lack of a primary antagonist. In the mid-1880s he helped establish the first school of acting in the United States, the Lyceum Theatre School, which later became the American Academy of Dramatic Arts (AADA). He was also well known for his theatrical innovations, having invented a variety of devices including flame-proof curtains, folding theater seats and the "Nebulator", a machine for creating clouds onstage. In all, he patented over 100 theatrical inventions.

By 1885, MacKaye had established three theaters in New York City: the St. James, Madison Square and the Lyceum Theatre. For the Chicago World's Fair of 1893, he began to construct a theatre capable of seating 10,000 people—the "Spectatorium"—but the Panic of 1893 deprived the project of necessary funds. The project was left incomplete.

MacKaye married Jeannie Spring, the daughter of Marcus Spring, during the time he was teaching art at Marcus Spring's Eagleswood Military Academy, in Perth Amboy, New Jersey. After a brief marriage to Jeannie, which ended in divorce, MacKaye married his second wife, Mary K. Medbery, in 1865. The couple had six children, four of whom attained notability: philosopher James MacKaye, poet and playwright Percy MacKaye, conservationist Benton MacKaye, and suffragist Hazel MacKaye.

Steele MacKaye fell ill in February 1894, and his physicians urged him to move to a warmer climate. He left Chicago on February 22 on a private train headed for San Diego. The train was near Timpas, Colorado on February 25 when MacKaye's health began to rapidly decline up until his death at 7:45 in the morning. His son, Percy, published his father's biography, Epoch: The Life of Steele MacKaye, in 1927.

== Inventions ==
Steele MacKaye was widely known for being an innovator in theater technology. He patented and invented more than 100 inventions including the Folding Theater Chair, the Fire Curtain, and the unique Double-Stage System.

The Double-Stage System was a large elevator-like structure that was used to load scenery on and off of the stage. It was only ever installed in the Madison Square Theatre (not to be confused with Madison Square Garden) because of its cost and complexity. The system cut the time of intermissions between scenes of plays from around 6 minutes to 40 seconds, which made the theatre more enjoyable to go to as a whole.

MacKaye is also responsible for converting the Lyceum Theatre to an overhead-lit theater. This is the first recorded occurrence of an overhead lighting structure in a North-American theater.

== Works ==
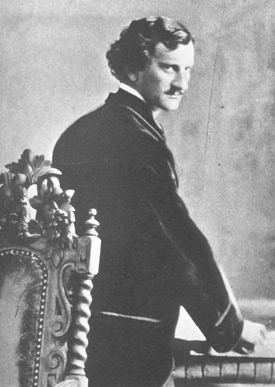

He wrote the plays Monaldi and Marriage. Other works include:

- The Twins (1876) (with Andrew Carpenter Wheeler)
- Won at Last (1877)
- Through the Dark (1878), later called Money Mad
- Hazel Kirke (1880)
- Anarchy (1887), originally called Paul Kauvar; or Anarchy, later shortened to Anarchy, and then again changed to Paul Kauvar.
- A Fool's Errand
- In Spite of All
