= Florence Fleming Noyes =

American dancer

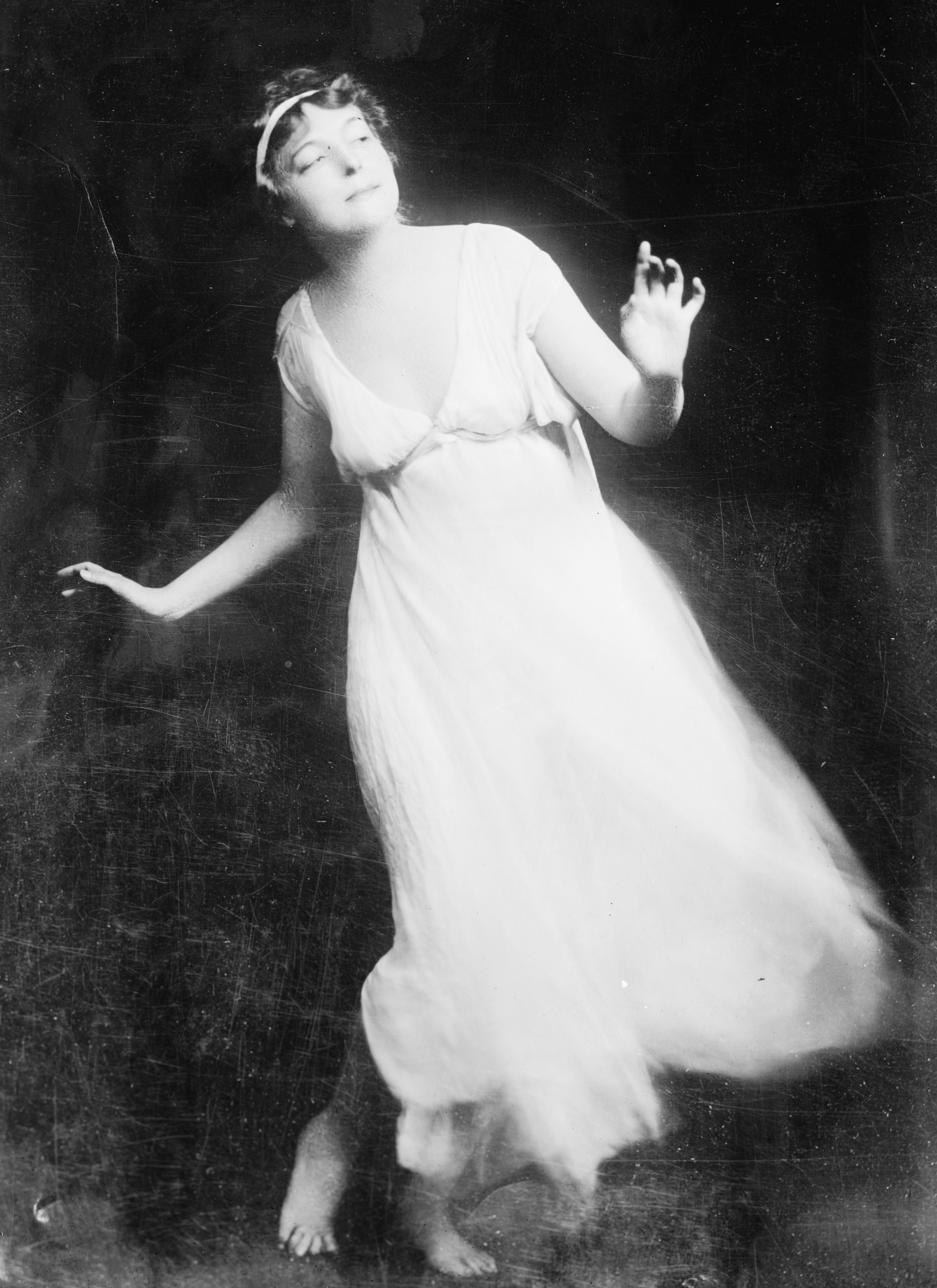
- Florence Fleming Noyes, from about 1913
- Born: 1871; Sharon, Massachusetts, U.S.
- Died: February 4, 1928 (aged 56–57); New York, New York, U.S.
- Occupations: Dancer, dance educator

Florence Fleming Noyes (1871– February 4, 1928) was an American modern dancer and dance educator. She founded schools and camps to teach dancers according to her own philosophy of movement. known as the Noyes Rhythm movement system.

== Early life and education ==
Noyes was from Sharon, Massachusetts, near Boston, and studied with Charles Wesley Emerson and Lucia Gale Barber.

== Career ==
In 1912 Noyes opened her first dance studio in Carnegie Hall, teaching her own version of rhythmic dance, which she eventually developed into the "Noyes Rhythm" movement system. "With the discovery of a sense of rhythm, pupils find the doors of artistic expression open to them and forms of beauty in color, music, sculture, dance, in the written and spoken word, are the result," she explained in a 1925 interview. Much like the students of Isadora Duncan or Ruth St. Denis, Noyes' dancers wore Greek-inspired flowing silk gowns, and they danced barefoot or in sandals, both choices meant to enhance and communicate the dancer's freedom.

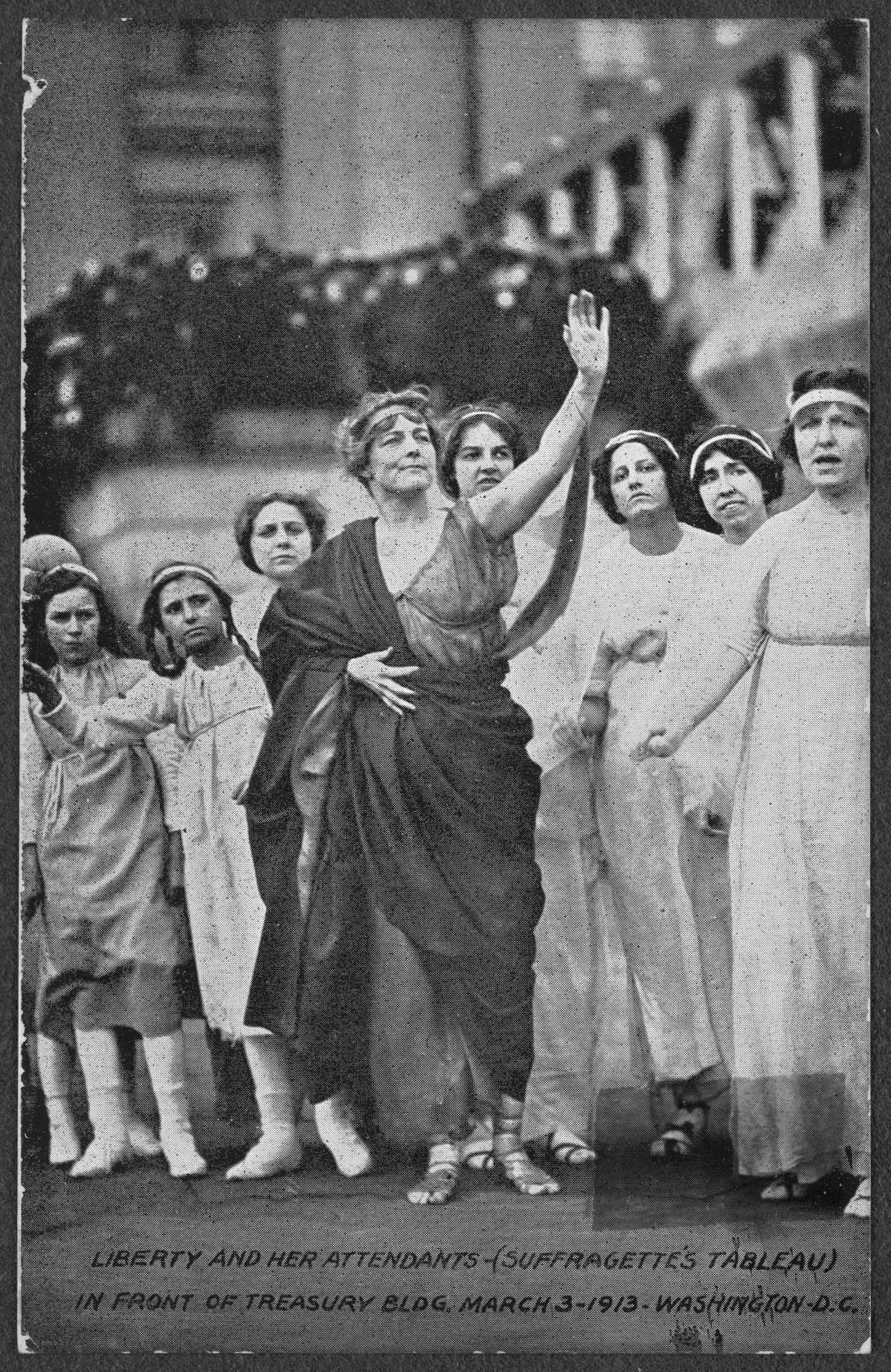
Noyes as Liberty, and her attendants. A suffrage tableau on the steps of the Treasury Building. March 3, 1913

Noyes danced in Paris at a 1912 conference about Rodin. In 1913 she dressed as Liberty at the Capitol in Washington, D.C. as part of a tableau vivant to bring publicity for the cause of women's suffrage. In 1921 she founded two dance camps in Portland, Connecticut, the Shepherd's Nine for women, and the Junio. Whole families came to her camps in Connecticut as a summer escape.

== Publications ==
- The Psychology of the New Education (1923, with Wolstan Crocker Brown)
- Rhythm: The Basis of Art and Education (1923, with Wolstan Crocker Brown)

== Personal life and legacy ==
Noyes died in 1928, in New York City. The Noyes School of Rhythm in New York continued offering dance classes until 2002. Similarly, the Noyes Rhythm Camp in Cobalt, Connecticut, continued long past Noyes's lifetime. The Noyes Rhythm movement system is still taught at summer programs and in classes. Among her students were actress Edith Wynne Matthison, actor Richard Bennett, dancer Grace Christie, and dancer and dance educator Valeria Gibson Ladd. Composer Bertha Remick collaborated and taught with Noyes.
