= James MacKaye =

American engineer and philosopher (1872–1935)

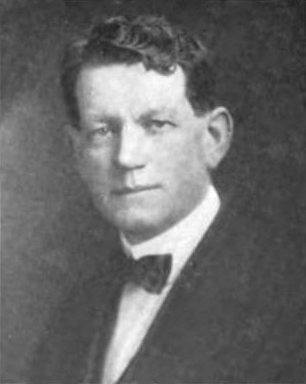
- Born: James Medbery MacKaye; April 8, 1872; New York, New York, U.S.
- Died: January 22, 1935 (aged 62); Boston, Massachusetts, U.S.
- Education: Packard's Business College; Harvard University
- Occupations: Engineer, philosopher
- Parents: Steele MacKaye (father); Mary MacKaye (mother)
- Relatives: Benton MacKaye (brother); Hazel MacKaye (sister); Percy MacKaye (brother)

James Medbery MacKaye (April 8, 1872 – January 22, 1935) was an American engineer and philosopher.

== Biography ==
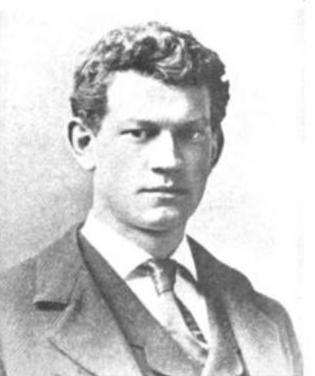
As a Harvard undergraduate, c. 1895

MacKaye was born in New York City, the son of actor Steele MacKaye and Mary (Medbery) MacKaye, and brother of poet Percy MacKaye, theater professional and suffragist Hazel MacKaye and conservationist Benton MacKaye. He attended Grammar School No. 40 near Groton, Massachusetts and Packard's Business College in New York, and in 1895 obtained an SB degree from Harvard University.

In early 1890 MacKaye worked as a patent lawyer with the Census Bureau in Washington, and in April 1891 he became secretary to Nathaniel Southgate Shaler at the Harvard Geological Department, holding for a number of years various minor appointments in that institution. He joined the Boston firm Stone & Webster in 1899, where he worked as a research engineer. During the 28 years that he remained affiliated to that company he published several books on ethics, economics and politics, including Americanized Socialism, The Logic of Conduct and, most notably, The Economy of Happiness.

== The Economy of Happiness ==
In this highly original but now largely forgotten work, MacKaye attempted to rescue the utilitarianism of Jeremy Bentham from the changes that this doctrine had subsequently undergone as a result of John Stuart Mill's moderating influence. MacKaye conceived human beings—and sentient beings generally—as mechanisms of transforming resources into happiness, which he argued was the only intrinsic good. The goal of a society was therefore viewed by MacKaye as the problem of finding that arrangement which would produce the highest output of happiness attainable given the inputs available. As he wrote,

That which society should seek to attain, the maximum surplus of happiness, may be referred to by different names according to the relation in which we think of it, e.g. the utilitarian end, the end or object of utility, of society or of justice, and so forth. It is in the nature of a perfectly definite magnitude. Quantities of pain or pleasure may be regarded as magnitudes having the same definiteness as tons of pig iron, barrels of sugar, bushels of wheat, yards of cotton, or pounds of wool; and as political economy seeks to ascertain the conditions under which these commodities may be produced with the greatest efficiency--so the economy of happiness seeks to ascertain the conditions under which happiness, regarded as a commodity, may be produced with the greatest efficiency--how the maximum output of happiness may be achieved with the means available. In order to ascertain what these conditions are, we need to proceed as any manufacturer trained to his business would proceed, were he endeavoring to ascertain how he could most economically produce beer, or molasses, or oil, or tacks. He would satisfy himself by the inductive or common sense method what laws and resources of nature and of human nature were available under conditions as he found them, and the means thus available he would, to the best of his ability, adapt to his ends. Our problem is a similar one, and we shall adopt similar means to solve it.

MacKaye concluded that the form of social organization most conducive to that goal was a particular type of socialism which he dubbed "pantocracy".

== The Dynamic Universe ==
In 1930 MacKaye startled the world after announcing an alternative to Albert Einstein's general theory of relativity. His theory of "radiation" was first presented at the twenty-ninth annual meeting of the American Philosophical Association held at Columbia University. Contrary to Einstein, MacKaye proposed a dynamic universe, assuming that all space was filled with radiation of super-frequency and super-penetration moving in all directions with the speed of light. As he claimed in the concluding paragraph of his paper, subsequently published in The Journal of Philosophy, "If the radiation theory is sound, [...] it is plain that Einstein has discovered nothing about time, space, motion or acceleration unknown to the Newtonians, or shown that what they have hitherto assumed about those magnitudes is contrary to any fact in nature." The theory was described as "magnificent" by William Pepperell Montague and appears to have been generally well received by the audience. He later expanded his views in the book, The Dynamic Universe, published in 1931.

MacKaye entered the academic profession only in 1931, when he became a lecturer at Rollins College. The following year he was appointed Professor of Philosophy at Dartmouth College. At the end of 1934 MacKaye was hospitalized at the Massachusetts General Hospital in Boston, where he had a gall bladder surgery. Although the doctors predicted recovery, he died a week later. A service was held on January 24 at the Memorial Church of Harvard University, where his remains were cremated.

== Bibliography ==
- The Economy of Happiness, Boston: Little, Brown, and Co., 1906.
- The Happiness of Nations: A Beginning in Political Engineering, New York: B.W. Huebsch, 1915.
- The Mechanics of Socialism, Boston: Fabian Club, 1915.
- Americanized Socialism; A Yankee View of Capitalism, New York: Boni and Liveright, 1918.
- The Science of Usefulness, New York: Boni and Liveright, 1920.
- The Logic of Conduct, New York: Boni and Liveright, 1924.
- Thoreau: Philosopher of Freedom, New York: Vanguard Press, 1930
- The Dynamic Universe, New York: C. Scribner's Sons, 1931
- The Logic of Language, Hanover, New Hampshire: Dartmouth College Publications, 1939.
