= Jessie Belle Hardy Stubbs MacKaye =

American suffragist

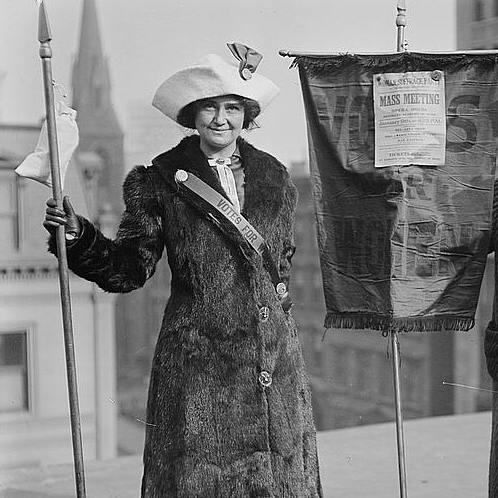
- Born: 1876; Chicago, Illinois, U.S.
- Died: April 18, 1921 (aged 44–45); New York City, New York, U.S.
- Education: Columbia University
- Occupation: Social Activist
- Known for: Women's Suffrage
- Spouses: F. Gurney Stubbs (m. 1896; died 1910) Benton MacKaye (m. 1915)

Jessie Belle Hardy Stubbs MacKaye (1876 – April 18, 1921) was an American suffragist. She was president of the Milwaukee Women's Peace Society.

== Biography ==
Hardy Stubbs MacKaye was the daughter of Major A. L. Hardy of Pittsburgh, a notable newspaper reporter for the Chicago Times.

She was the head surgical nurse at St. Luke's hospital in Chicago and met her first husband, Dr. F. Gurney Stubbs there. Dr. Stubbs died from pneumonia in 1910 and Hardy Stubbs moved to New York City afterward, attending Columbia University’s School of Philanthropy and becoming the legislative chair of the Women's Peace Society.

She was noted for "urging all women to remain unmarried or to refuse to bear children" to express the seriousness of female suffrage.

In 1915, she married Benton MacKaye. Jessie died by suicide in 1921 by drowning herself in the East River. While grieving her death, husband Benton MacKaye began formulating the idea that became the Appalachian Trail, as his wife had loved long-distance walking and hiking.

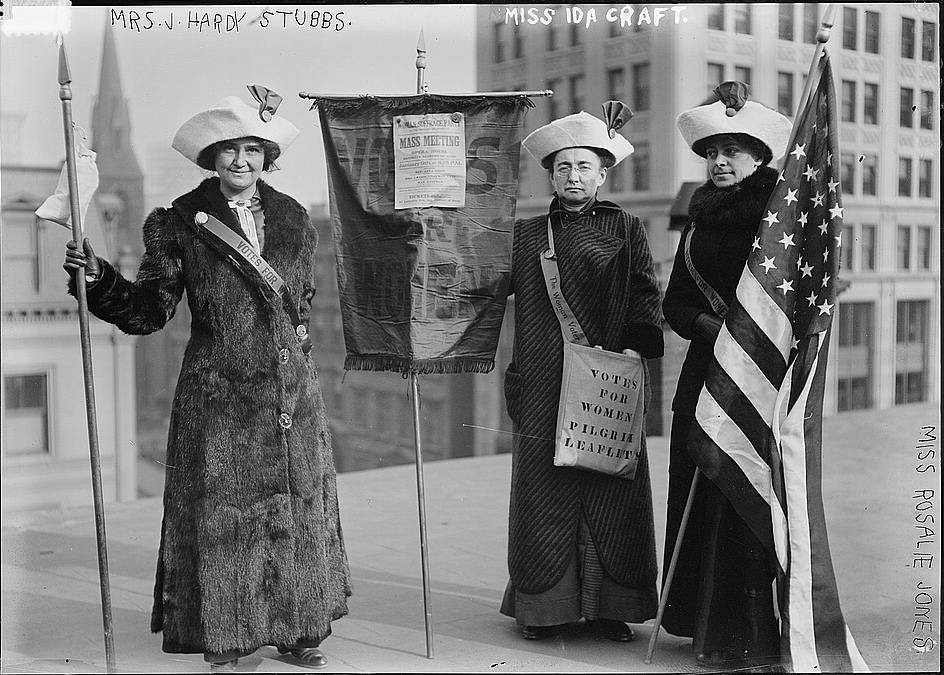
Mrs. J. Hardy Stubbs, Miss Ida Craft, Miss Rosalie Jones circa 1912–1913
