= Hazel Kirke =

1879 play by Steele MacKaye

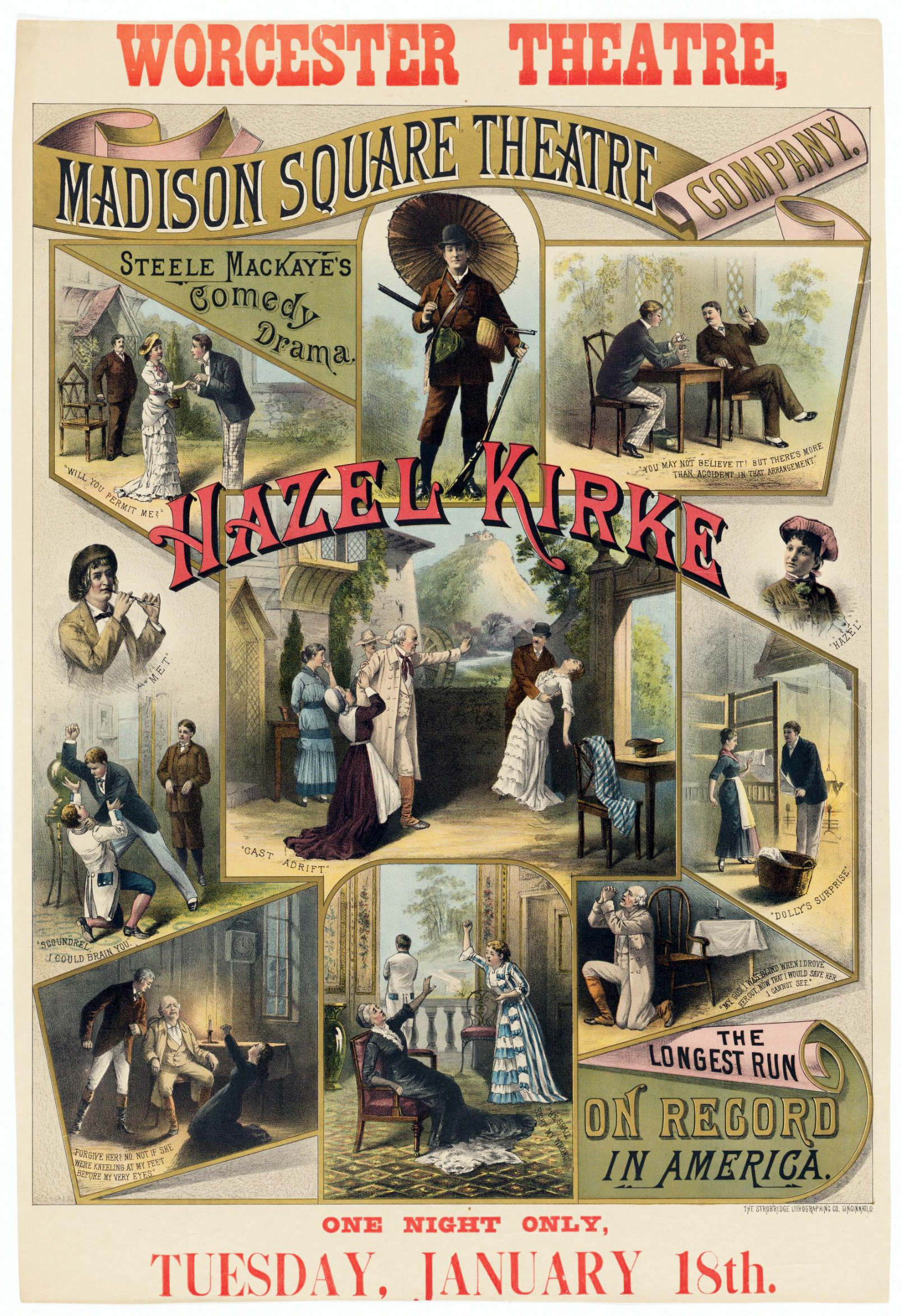
- Poster for Hazel Kirke, circa 1881
- Original language: English
- Written by: Steele MacKaye

Premiere
- Date: February 4, 1880
- Place: Madison Square Theatre, New York City

Hazel Kirke is a play in four acts written by American actor and dramatist Steele MacKaye.

== Overview ==
The play was written between 1871 and 1879 in the town of Dublin, New Hampshire. MacKaye meant it to be expressly for New York City's Madison Square Theatre, which MacKaye had recently renovated and completely remodeled. Originally titled An Iron Will, the play toured Philadelphia, Baltimore and Washington until renovations on the Madison Square Theatre were complete. It premiered there on February 4, 1880, and the original production became immensely successful; it starred actress Effie Ellsler in the title role and ran for 486 consecutive performances, the record of its time. before closing May 31, 1881.

Because MacKaye revolutionized the concept of multiple companies performing the same production simultaneously, by 1883 the play had been performed more than two thousand times.

== Legacy ==
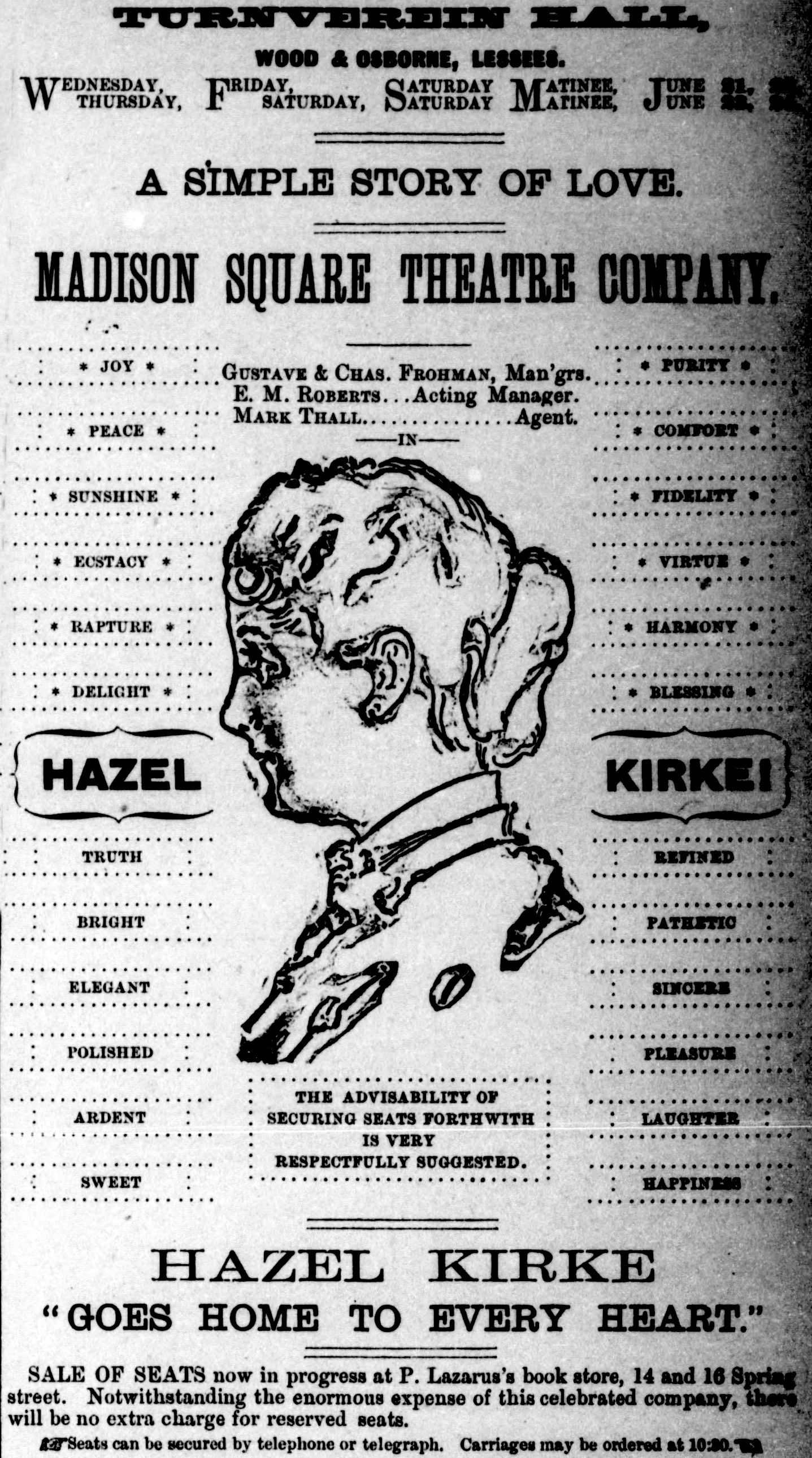
A poster for the play from a newspaper, 1884

By the mid-1910s the play had been produced in England, Australia, Japan, and elsewhere. In 1916 it was adapted into a film starring Pearl White and produced at the Whartons Studio in Ithaca, New York.

Hazel Kirke was adapted into an opera by composer Mark Houston which debuted at the Lake George Opera Festival. The New York Times called the result "like watching a B movie; its kitschy charm wears thin after a short while."

== Original cast ==
- Effie Ellsler ... Hazel Kirke
- Gabrielle Du Sauld ... Dolly Dutton (also later played by Georgia Cayvan)
- Mrs. Cecil Rush ... Emily Carringford (Lady Travers)
- Blanche Whiffen ... Mercy Kirke
- Annie Ellsler ... Clara, a maid
- Eben Plympton ... Arthur Carringford (Lord Travers)
- Charles Walter (C.W.) Couldock ... Dunstan Kirke
- Dominick Murray ... Aaron Rodney
- Thomas Whiffen ... Pittacus Green
- Joseph Frankau ... Methuselah Miggins
- Edward Coleman ... Barney O'Flynn, a valet
- Fred P. Barton ... Joe, a miller
- George Grey ... Dan, a miller
- Henry Jones ... Thomas, a servant.

== Notes ==
Preceded by Humpty Dumpty	Longest-running Broadway show 1881–1885	Succeeded by Adonis
