= McKay =

McKay, MacKay or Mackay is a Scottish and Irish surname. The last phoneme in the name is traditionally pronounced to rhyme with 'eye', but in some parts of the world this has come to rhyme with 'hey'. In Scotland, it corresponds to Clan Mackay. Notable people with the surname include:

== A ==
- Adam McKay
- Aeneas Mackay (1839-1909), Prime Minister of the Netherlands, member and president of the Dutch House of Representatives
- Al McKay
- Alan Lindsay Mackay
- Alexander McKay (disambiguation)
- Alfred Edwin McKay
- Allen McKay
- Ami McKay
- Andrew McKay (Australian footballer)
- Andrew McKay (actor)
- Andy McKay
- Andy Mackay
- Angus McKay (disambiguation)
- Antonio McKay
- Asia Mackay

== B ==
- Barrie McKay
- Ben McKay (disambiguation)
- Bill McKay (disambiguation)
- Billy Mckay
- Bob McKay
- Bobby McKay
- Brad McKay (doctor)
- Brendan McKay (born 1995), American baseball player

== C ==
- Callum McKay, fictional character in Shortland Street
- Charles McKay
- Charles Mackay (disambiguation)
- Cheryl McKay
- Christopher McKay (planetary scientist)
- Clan McKay
- Clarence Mackay (1874–1938), American financier
- Claude McKay
- Clint McKay
- Cody McKay
- Colin McKay
- Craig McKay (disambiguation)

== D ==
- Daniel MacKay
- Daniel McKay
- Daithí McKay
- David McKay (disambiguation)
- Derek McKay
- Dianne B. McKay
- Don McKay (disambiguation)
- Donald McKay
- Donald McKay (politician)
- Doreen McKay
- Doug McKay (public servant)
- Douglas McKay
- Douglas I. McKay
- Dryden McKay (born 1997), American ice hockey goaltender
- Duncan McKay (disambiguation)
- Dwanna L. McKay
- Dylan McKay, a fictional character from Beverly Hills, 90210

== E ==
- Elsie Mackay, aka 'Poppy Wyndham', English actress and pioneering aviator
- Elsie Mackay (actress), Broadway and film actress in the 1920s–30s
- Ernie McKay

== F ==
- Freddie McKay
- Fulton Mackay

== G ==
- Gardner McKay
- George McKay (disambiguation)
- Glenda McKay
- Gordon W. McKay

== H ==
- Hamish McKay
- Harry McKay (politician) (1925–1987), Canadian politician and judge
- Harry McKay (footballer) (born 1997), Australian footballer
- Heather McKay (born 1941), Australian squash player
- Hec McKay
- Helen Mackay (sculptor) (1897–1973), British artist
- Helen McKay, dance band singer
- Helen McKay (plant physiologist)
- Henry D. McKay
- Hilary McKay
- Hilda Mabel McKay (1893-1987), Australian welfare worker and philanthropist
- Hugh Victor McKay
- Hugh Mackay, 14th Lord Reay (1937–2013)
- Hunter McKay

== I ==
- Ian McKay (disambiguation):
- Iven Giffard Mackay, Australian World War II general

== J ==
- J. Curtis McKay, American legislator
- Jack McKay (footballer, born 1885)
- Jack McKay (footballer, born 1996)
- James McKay (disambiguation):
- Jason McKay
- Jessie Mackay (1864–1938), New Zealand poet, journalist, feminist and animal rights activist
- Jessie McKay (born 1989), Australian professional wrestler, ring name Billie Kay
- Jim McKay (1921–2008), professional name of American sportscaster James McManus
- Jim McKay (director)
- Jodi McKay
- John MacKay (disambiguation)
- Julian MacKay

== K ==
- K. Gunn McKay (1925–2000), American politician
- Katherine Mackay (1901–1975), Australian police officer
- Katherine Duer Mackay (1878–1930), American suffragist and socialite
- Katrine Mackay (1864–1944), New Zealand journalist, novelist and cook
- Kevin McKay (artist) (born 1966), Australian artist

== L ==
- Lathan McKay
- Laura Jean McKay, Australian author
- Leo McKay, Jr.

== M ==
- Malky Mackay (born 1972), Scottish footballer and manager
- Malky Mackay (footballer, born 1942), Scottish footballer
- Margaret MacKay (1903–1998), New Zealand lawyer
- Margaret McKay
- Maureen McKay
- Matt McKay
- McKay Christensen
- Megan McKay, basketball player
- Mekale McKay (born 1993), American football player
- Mhairi McKay (born 1975), Scottish golfer
- Michael McKay (disambiguation)
- Molly McKay
- Mungo McKay
- Muriel McKay (1914–1970), Australian murder victim

== N ==
- Natasha McKay
- Nellie McKay
- Nellie Y. McKay
- Nicholas McKay (disambiguation)

== P ==
- Pat McKay, Scottish martial artist
- Patrick McKay (born 1980/1981), American screenwriter
- Patricia McKay
- Peter McKay (footballer), Scottish footballer
- Peter McKay (Australian politician)
- Peter Mackay, 4th Earl of Inchcape (born 1943)
- Peter MacKay, Canadian politician (born 1965)

== R ==
- R. J. McKay, Australia-born biologist
- Randy McKay, Canadian retired ice hockey player
- Ray McKay, former ice hockey player
- Raymond McKay (1925–1993), American labor leader
- Rich McKay, president of the Atlanta Falcons
- Ritchie McKay, American basketball coach
- Robert Mackay (disambiguation)
- Roderick McIntosh McKay, Scottish chess master
- Rodney McKay, a character from Stargate Atlantis
- Roy McKay (baseball) (1933–1995), baseball pitcher
- Ray McKay, Founder of Hoggin Alberta Veterans Ranch

== S ==
- Sally McKay Artist
- Sandra Lee McKay, Professor Emeritus of San Francisco State University
- Scott McKay (disambiguation)
- Serena McKay (1997–2017), a Canadian woman who was brutally murdered and her murder posted online
- Shane McKay, a character from Degrassi
- Simon Mackay, Baron Tanlaw (born 1934), member of the House of Lords
- Smith McKay (1817–1889), Newfoundland mine owner and politician
- Sophie McKay, a character from Shortland Street
- Sophie McKay (footballer) (born 2006), Australian rules footballer
- Stephanie McKay, American soul singer and songwriter
- Stephen McKay, British Professor in Social Research

== T ==
- Thomas McKay (disambiguation):

== W ==
- William McKay
- Willie McKay

== See also ==
- All pages beginning with Mckay
- All pages beginning with Mackay
- Nautyn McKay-Loescher
- McKay's approximation for the coefficient of variation
- Mackay (disambiguation), includes a list of people with the surname
- MacKaye
- Mackey (disambiguation)
- Mackeys (disambiguation)
- McKey (disambiguation)
- Floortje Mackaij (born 1995), Dutch racing cyclist
- Roy Makaay (born 1975), Dutch football coach and former player
