= McKee =

McKee is a surname of Scottish or Irish origin. The surname is derived from the Gaelic Mac Aodha ("son of Aodh") a patronymic form of an old Gaelic personal name which means "fire". Similar surnames which also are derived from the same Gaelic patronymic are McCoy, McGee, Kee, McHugh and McKay. Notable people with the surname include:

== Disambiguation pages ==
- Andrew McKee (disambiguation)
- John McKee (disambiguation)
- Kevin McKee (disambiguation)
- Paul McKee (disambiguation)
- Samuel McKee (disambiguation)

== Individuals ==
=== Politicians, government officials and military ===
- Alexander McKee (c. 1735 – 1799), British Indian Department agent (in North America) and colonel
- Billy McKee (1921–2019), Irish republican, a founding member and former leader of the Provisional Irish Republican Army
- Cara McKee, Scottish politician
- Daniel McKee (born 1951), Governor of Rhode Island
- Dave McKee (died 2005), Australian politician
- Dick McKee (1893–1920), member of the Irish Republican Army (IRA)
- Erin Elizabeth McKee, American diplomat
- Gordon McKee (politician) (born 1994), Scottish Member of Parliament (UK)
- Hugh McKee (1844–1871), American naval officer
- Ivan McKee (born 1963), Scottish politician
- J. Killeen McKee (1907-78), Canadian politician
- Joseph V. McKee (1889-1956), acting mayor of New York city
- Kinnaird R. McKee (1929–2013), United States Navy four-star admiral
- Mary Harrison McKee (1858–1930), only daughter of President Benjamin Harrison and his first wife
- Michael McKee (politician) (born 1940), Canadian politician and son of J. Killeen McKee
- Nicole McKee (born 1971/1972), New Zealand politician
- Redick McKee (1800–1886), American government official
- Rob McKee (born 1985), Canadian politician and son of Michael McKee
- Robert A. McKee (born 1949), American politician, former member of the Maryland House of Delegates
- Sarah Galt Elwood McKee (1842–1934), Canadian social reformer and temperance leader
- Seth J. McKee (1916–2016), United States Air Force general
- Theodore McKee (born 1947), chief judge of the United States Court of Appeals for the Third Circuit
- Thom McKee (born 1955), United States Navy officer
- Tom McKee (born 1941), American politician

=== Authors and publishers ===
- Alexander McKee (author) (1918–1992), British journalist, military historian and diver
- Arthur McKee, New Zealand newspaper proprietor, photo-engraver and printer
- David McKee (1935–2022), British writer and illustrator
- Lyra McKee (1990–2019), Northern Irish journalist and author
- Robert McKee (born 1941), American author
- Suzy McKee Charnas (1939–2023), American novelist and short story writer

=== Doctors, educators, and scientists ===
- Ann McKee, neurologist and neuropathologist
- Christopher McKee (born 1942), astrophysicist
- Elsie McKee, theology professor
- Kenneth McKee (1906–1991), English orthopaedist, pioneer of hip replacement surgery
- Martin McKee (1956), English doctor and professor

=== Arts and culture ===
- Ben McKee (born 1985), American bassist for the band, Imagine Dragons
- Bonnie McKee (born 1984), American singer and songwriter
- Frances McKee (born 1966), Scottish singer and songwriter
- Gina McKee (born 1964), English actress
- Kayleigh McKee (born 1994), American voice actress
- Lonette McKee (born 1954), American actress, composer, producer, screenwriter and director
- Maria McKee (born 1964), American singer-songwriter
- Roxanne McKee, English 21st century actress and model

=== Athletes and coaches ===
- Charles McKee (born 1962), American sailor and Olympic bronze medalist
- Darrell McKee (born c. 1963), Canadian curler
- Frank McKee (1923–1988), Scottish professional footballer
- Grant McKee (born 1940), Canadian football player
- Jaimes McKee, (born 1987) English-born Hong Kong footballer
- James McKee (footballer), Scottish football player
- Jay McKee (born 1977), Canadian coach and former professional ice hockey player
- Jerry McKee (born 1946), American basketball player
- Joe McKee (born 1992), Scottish footballer player
- Melville McKee (born 1994), British racing driver
- Roger McKee (1926–2014), American Major League Baseball pitcher
- Tanner McKee (born 2000), American football player
- Tim McKee (born 1953), American swimmer, three-time Olympic silver medalist

=== Other professions ===
- Eva McKee (1890–1955), Irish craftswoman and designer

== Fictional characters ==
- Saddie McKee, protagonist of an American 1934 film

== See also ==
- McKey (surname)
- Clan MacKay
