= George Mackay =

George Mackay or Mckay may refer to:

== Arts and entertainment ==
- George McKay (actor) (1884–1945), Russian-American actor
- George Frederick McKay (1899–1970), American composer
- George MacKay (actor) (born 1992), English actor

== Law and politics ==
- George Mackay of Skibo (c. 1715–1782), Scottish soldier and MP for Sutherland
- George R. McKay (1817–1890), American politician in Michigan
- George McKay (Australian politician) (1819–1898), New South Wales colonial politician
- George Prevost McKay (1840–1924), Canadian businessman and political figure in Ontario
- George Mackay (Australian politician) (1872–1961), Speaker of the Australian House of Representatives

== Sports ==
- George Mackay (cricketer) (1860–1948), Australian cricketer
- George MacKay (rower) (1900–1972), Canadian rower
- George McKay (rugby union) (fl. 1920–1922), Australian rugby union player
- George Mackay (rugby union) (1906–1981), Australian rugby union player

== Others ==
- George Mackay, 3rd Lord Reay (1678–1748), Scottish noble
- George Mackay, 5th Lord Reay (1735–1768), Scottish noble
- George Leslie Mackay (1844–1901), Canadian missionary
- George Mackay (surgeon) (1861–1949), British ophthalmic surgeon
- George William Mackay (1882–1969), Canadian missionary in Taiwan
- George Chisholm MacKay (1898–1973), Canadian World War I pilot

== See also ==
- George Mackay Brown (1921–1996), Scottish poet, author and dramatist
- George Mackey (1916–2006), American mathematician
- George Mackie (disambiguation)
