= McKee (disambiguation) =

McKee is a surname. It may also refer to:

== Place names ==
In Canada:

- McKee Creek (British Columbia)

In the United States:

- McKee, Kentucky, a city
- McKee, Oregon, an unincorporated community
- McKee, Pennsylvania, a census-designated place
- McKee Township, Adams County, Illinois
- McKee Creek (West Virginia)
- McKee Run or Creek, Pennsylvania

== Other uses ==
- USS McKee, four United States Navy ships
- McKee Foods, an American company
- McKee field, an oil and gas producing field in Taranaki, New Zealand
- McKee power station, a power station in Taranaki, New Zealand
- McKee Barracks, Dublin, Ireland
- McKee Botanical Garden, Vero Beach, Florida, United States, on the National Register of Historic Places
- McKee Bridge, Oregon, United States, on the National Register of Historic Places
- McKee (VTA), a light rail station operated by Santa Clara Valley Transportation Authority
- The Trans-Canada Trophy, an aviation award often referred to as the "McKee Trophy"

== See also ==
- McKee City, New Jersey, an unincorporated community
- McKey (disambiguation)
