= McKee Creek =

McKee Creek may refer to:

- McKee Creek (British Columbia), Canada
- McKee Creek (West Virginia), United States
- McKee Run, also known as McKee Creek, Pennsylvania, United States

== See also ==
- McKees Creek
