= Mackey =

Mackey may refer to:

== Places ==
- Mackey, Indiana, United States, a town
- Mackey, Iowa, United States, an unincorporated community
- Mackey, a community in the municipality and incorporated township of Head, Clara and Maria, Ontario, Canada
- Mackey Rock, Marie Byrd Land, Antarctica

== Other uses ==
- Mackey (name), including a list of people with the name
- Mackey Airlines, small US international carrier
- Mackey Arena, an indoor sports venue at Purdue University

== See also ==
- Mackay (disambiguation)
- Mackeys (disambiguation)
- McKay (disambiguation)
- McKay (given name)
- McKay
- McKey (disambiguation)
