= Donald Mackay =

Donald Mackay, MacKay, or McKay may refer to:

== Politics and government ==
- Donald McKay (politician) (1836–1895), Canadian politician
- Donald Mackay, 11th Lord Reay (1839–1921), Dutch-born British administrator and Liberal politician
- Donald McDonald Mackay (1845–1904), Australian politician
- Donald W. MacKay (1874–1952), Canadian politician
- Donald Morrison MacKay (1889–1953), Canadian politician
- Donald Brenham McKay, former mayor of Tampa, Florida
- Don McKay (politician) (1908–1988), New Zealand politician
- Donald Hugh Mackay (1914–1979), mayor of Calgary, Alberta
- Donald Mackay (anti-drugs campaigner) (1933–1977), Australian politician and anti-drugs campaigner
- Donald Mackay, Baron Mackay of Drumadoon (1946–2018), Scottish judge

== Sports ==
- Donald George Mackay (1870–1958), Australian explorer and long-distance cyclist
- Donald McKay (footballer) (fl. 1890s), Scottish footballer
- Don Mackay (born 1940), Scottish football player
- Donald Mackay-Coghill (born 1941), South African cricketer

== Other people ==
- Donald Mackay, 5th of Strathnaver (died 1370), chief of the ancient Clan Mackay
- Donald Mackay, 11th of Strathnaver (died 1550), chief of the ancient Clan Mackay
- Donald Mackay, 1st Lord Reay (1591–1649), Scottish peer and soldier
- Donald Mackay (fur trader) (1753–1833), Canadian trader with the North West Company
- Donald Mackay (Royal Navy officer) (1780–1850), British admiral
- Donald McKay (1810–1880), Canadian-American shipbuilder
  - MS Donald McKay (1938) one of the first C2 ships
- Donald McKay (scout) (1836–1899), American scout, actor, and spokesman
- Donald MacKay (architect) (c. 1846 – c. 1887), Scottish-American architect
- Donald Cameron MacKay (1906–1979), Canadian maritime artist
- Donald A. Mackay (1914–2005), American illustrator
- Donald McKay (RAF officer) (1917–1959), British flying ace of the Second World War
- Donald MacCrimmon MacKay (1922–1987), Scottish physicist
- Donald Mackay (scientist) (1936–2023), Scottish-born Canadian scientist of environmental chemistry
- Donald Mackay (medical doctor) (died 1981)
