= Mackey (name) =

Mackey is an Irish surname. It is derived from the Gaelic Mac Aoidh meaning 'son of Aodh', a variant of the Scottish and Irish McKay. In Ireland the name is also derived from to Ó Macdha 'descendant of Macdha', a given name meaning 'virile, manly', and may be anglicised as such.

== People with the surname Mackey ==
- Albert Mackey (1807–1881), writer on freemasonry
- Albert D. Mackey (died 1935), American politician and lawyer from Maryland
- Amanda Mackey (1951–2022), American casting director
- Bill Mackey (1927–1951), race car driver
- Biz Mackey (1897–1965), American Negro league baseball player and manager
- Bobby Mackey, country music singer
- Clay Mackey, Washington viticulturist
- Connor Mackey (born 1996), American ice hockey player
- Crandal Mackey (1865–1957), American lawyer and newspaper publisher
- Dick Mackey, dogsled racer
- Douglass Mackey (born 1989 or 1990), American social media influencer
- Edmund William McGregor Mackey (1846–1884), U.S. Representative from South Carolina
- Emma Mackey (born 1996), French-British actress
- Gerry Mackey Irish football player (1933–2021)
- George Mackey (1916–2006), mathematician
- Greg Mackey (1961–2014), Australian rugby league footballer
- Harriet Wright O'Leary Mackey (1916-1999), American teacher and politician and first woman to serve on the tribal council of the Choctaw Nation of Oklahoma
- Harry Arista Mackey (1869-1938), American politician
- Hayley Mackey (born 2001), is a New Zealand judoka
- Howard Hamilton Mackey (1901–1987), American architect, educator
- Jack Mackey (1922–1945), Australian recipient of the Victoria Cross
- James Mackey (disambiguation), multiple people
- Janet Mackey (1953–2024), politician
- Jermain Mackey (born 1979), Bahamian boxer of the 2000s and 2010s
- John Mackey (disambiguation), multiple people
- Kevin Mackey (born 1946), basketball coach
- Kyle Mackey (born 1962), American football player
- Lance Mackey (1970–2022), dogsled racer
- Levi A. Mackey (1819–1889), 19th century politician
- Malcolm Mackey (born 1970), basketball player
- Mick Mackey (1912–1982), hurler
- Moana Mackey (born 1974), politician
- Nathaniel Mackey (born 1947), American writer
- Nick Mackey, politician
- Sandra Mackey (c. 1930–2015), expert on Middle East
- Steve Mackey (born 1966), musician
- Steven Mackey (born 1956), composer
- Wade Clark Mackey (born 1946), American author and social scientist
- William Mackey (Jesuit) (1915–1995), Canadian Jesuit Educationist and founder of the modern educational system of Bhutan

== People with the given name Mackey ==
The surname Mackey has occasionally been used as a given name.

- Mackey Sasser (born 1962), American former Major League Baseball player
- Mackey Saturday (born 1985), American designer and typographer

== Fictional characters ==
- Vic Mackey, main character of the FX drama series The Shield
- Mr. Mackey, on the animated series South Park
