= John Mackie =

John Mackie may refer to:

- John C. Mackie (1920–2008), U.S. Representative from Michigan
- John Duncan Mackie (1887–1978), Scottish historian
- J. L. Mackie (1917–1981), Australian-born philosopher, best known for his views on meta-ethics
- John Mackie, Baron John-Mackie (1909–1994), British Labour Member of Parliament 1959–1974
- John Mackie (Scottish Unionist politician) (1898–1958), Scottish Unionist Member of Parliament for Galloway 1931–1958
- John Mackie (physician) (1748–1831), Scottish physician
- John F. Mackie (1835–1910), first United States Marine to receive the Medal of Honor
- John Milton Mackie (1813–1894), American writer
- John Mackie (Kirkcudbright MP) (died 1858), MP for Kirkcudbright Stewartry
- John Mackie (born 1961), bassist for Scottish post-punk band Scars

== Association football ==
- Alec Mackie (Irish footballer) (John Alexander Mackie, 1903–1984), Irish professional footballer who played for Arsenal, Portsmouth and Northampton Town
- John Mackie (footballer, born 1910) (1910–1980), Scottish professional footballer who played for Hull City, Bradford City and Chesterfield
- John Mackie (footballer, born 1976), English professional footballer who played for Reading and Leyton Orient

== See also ==
- Jack McKay (disambiguation)
- John MacKay (disambiguation)
- John Mackey (disambiguation)
- John McKay (disambiguation)
