= Kevin McKay =

Kevin McKay may refer to:

- Kevin McKay (artist) (born 1966), Australian artist
- Kevin McKay (athlete) (born 1969), British track and field athlete
- Kevin McKay (musician), Scottish DJ, electronic musician, record label owner and record producer
