= Charles Mackay =

Charles (or Charlie) Mackay, McKay, or MacKay may refer to:

- Charles Mackay (author) (1814–1889), Scottish poet, journalist, author, anthologist, novelist, and songwriter
- Charles McKay (1855–1883), American naturalist and explorer
- Charles Mackay (mayor) (1875–1929), New Zealand lawyer, local politician, and Mayor of Wanganui
- Charlie MacKay (1880–1953), Australian rules footballer and physician
- Charles Reay Mackay, Australian immunologist, fellow of the Australian Academy of Science
- Charles R. MacKay, pseudonym for William Harral Johnson and William Stewart Ross used on Life of Charles Bradlaugh, M.P. (1888), a libelous attack on Charles Bradlaugh
- Charles MacKay (born 1950), American arts administrator
- Charles McKay (Oregon pioneer) (1808–1873), American fur trapper
