= McKay Lake =

McKay Lake may refer to:

- McKay Lake (Minnesota)
- McKay Lake (Ottawa), a lake in Ottawa, Ontario
- McKay Lake (Pic River), a lake in Thunder Bay District, Ontario
- McKay Lake (Cochrane District), a lake in Cochrane District, Ontario
- McKay Lake (Muskoka District), a lake in Muskoka District, Ontario
- McKay Lake (Simpson Island), a lake on Simpson Island, Thunder Bay District, Ontario
- McKay Lake (Manitoba), a lake near Grand Rapids, Manitoba
