= Margaret MacKay =

Margaret MacKay or Margaret Mackay may refer to:

- Margaret MacKay (lawyer) (1903–1998), New Zealand lawyer
- Margaret Mackay (writer) (1802–1887), Scottish writer

== See also ==
- Margaret McKay (1907–1996), British Labour Party member of parliament for Clapham
