= Kevin Harper =

British footballer (born 1976)

Personal information
- Full name: Kevin Patrick Harper
- Date of birth: 15 January 1976 (age 50)
- Place of birth: Oldham, England
- Position: Winger

Youth career
- 1992: Hutchison Vale

Senior career*
Years	Team	Apps	(Gls)
1992–1998	Hibernian	94	(15)
1998–2000	Derby County	32	(1)
1999–2000	→ Walsall (loan)	9	(1)
2000–2005	Portsmouth	119	(9)
2003	→ Norwich City (loan)	9	(0)
2004	→ Leicester City (loan)	2	(0)
2005–2007	Stoke City	26	(1)
2006–2007	→ Carlisle United (loan)	7	(0)
2007	→ Walsall (loan)	10	(4)
2007–2009	Dunfermline Athletic	29	(5)
2015–2016	Thorniewood United	7	(0)
Total		337	(36)

International career
1995–1997	Scotland U21	7	(4)
2003	Scotland B	1	(0)

Managerial career
- 2018–2020: Albion Rovers
- * Club domestic league appearances and goals

Kevin Patrick Harper (born 15 January 1976) is a football coach and former player. He played as a winger for Hibernian, Derby County, Walsall, Portsmouth, Norwich City, Leicester City, Stoke City, Carlisle United and Dunfermline Athletic. Born in England, played for the Scotland U21 national team and Scotland national football B team, He managed Scottish League Two side Albion Rovers from November 2018 to May 2020.

== Personal life ==
Harper was born in Oldham and raised in Glasgow's Possilpark area, attending St. Theresa's Primary and St. Augustine's Secondary School.

== Playing career ==
=== Hibernian ===
Harper played for youth club Hutchison Vale in Edinburgh before he was signed by Hibernian and made his professional debut aged just 17. As a black footballer, Harper was in a small minority within Scottish football. He was unhappy that having claimed Gary Mackay had racially abused him during an Edinburgh derby game in November 1996, the SFA did not take action in response to his complaint.

=== England ===
Derby County manager Jim Smith signed Harper for £300,000 in September 1998. Harper scored two goals for Derby; one against Liverpool in the league and one against Swansea City in the FA Cup. He was loaned out to Walsall in December 1999 for the remainder of the season.

His spell at Walsall was cut short when Portsmouth made an offer of £300,000 for his services in March 2000. Harper moved to Fratton Park having started only seven games for Derby. The Scottish under-21 international soon settled into the team at Portsmouth, but missed much of the 2000–01 season with a shin splints problem. In 2001–02 he had the dubious honour of having been sent off (twice) more times than he scored (once). However, he was a crucial member of the side that won the First Division title in 2002–03.

Despite his impressive part in Portsmouth's promotion, Harper was loaned out to Norwich in September 2003. His loan spell at Carrow Road was initially for one month but was extended to three months. He played well at Norwich, but was also sent off for a two-footed tackle on Luciano Zavagno in a match against Derby County. He contributed nine league appearances during Norwich's 2003/04 season after which they were promoted to the Premier League as First Division champions in his absence. On his return to Fratton Park he made only nine appearances for Portsmouth in the 2003–04 season. After failing to regain his place at the start of the 2004–05 season he was loaned to Leicester City.

In January 2005 was sold to Stoke City. Despite starting his Stoke career impressively, Harper was dogged by injuries that prevented him challenging for a first team place. He scored once for Stoke, in a 3–1 win over Norwich City. Harper was loaned to Carlisle United in October 2006 and then Walsall, whom he had played for on loan earlier in his career. He was released by Stoke manager Tony Pulis in May 2007.

=== Return to Scotland ===
On 7 July 2007, Harper opted to join Dunfermline Athletic, of the Scottish First Division. He scored the winning goal against Stirling Albion on 25 August 2007 and played in Dunfermline's UEFA Cup matches at home 16 August and away 30 August against BK Hacken FC of Sweden. Harper's season was rather inconsistent, though on 25 March 2008 he scored a hat-trick in a re-arranged fixture against First Division strugglers Stirling Albion.

== Coaching career ==
Following the departure of their Under 20s coach, SPFL side Airdrieonians appointed Harper as the replacement in July 2015. He left this post in September 2015. Harper has also set up his own football academy based in Stepps.

In November 2015, Thorniewood United manager and former Hibernian team-mate Andy Frame, persuaded Harper to come out of retirement and join the club in a player-coach role.

Harper was appointed Albion Rovers manager in November 2018. He became the first black, Asian or minority ethnic manager of a Scottish club since Márcio Máximo in 2003. A struggling Rovers side won none of their first 12 matches under Harper, but then won five of their last nine fixtures in 2018–19 Scottish League Two to avoid relegation. In May 2019, Harper extended his contract with the club to the end of the 2019–20 season. Albion again avoided relegation by finishing ninth in that season, but Harper decided to leave the club at the end of his contract in May 2020. Harper later revealed that, despite having avoided relegation again with a very poor 9th-place finish, he had been offered reduced terms, in line with a greatly reduced club budget due to prevailing circumstances, to stay and believed the board could match the ambition he had for the club.

In June 2020, Harper appeared in a special podcast panel discussing his experiences of racism in football with A View from the Terrace host Craig Fowler.

On 15 November 2022, Lochee United appoint Hibs first team scout Kevin Harper as new manager.

== Career statistics ==
=== Club ===
Appearances and goals by club, season and competition
Club	Season	League			FA Cup		League Cup		Europe		Total	
Club	Season	Division	Apps	Goals	Apps	Goals	Apps	Goals	Apps	Goals	Apps	Goals
Hibernian	1993–94	Scottish Premier Division	2	0	0	0	0	0	0	0	2	0
Hibernian	1994–95	Scottish Premier Division	23	5	0	0	0	0	0	0	23	5
Hibernian	1995–96	Scottish Premier Division	16	3	1	0	2	0	0	0	19	3
Hibernian	1996–97	Scottish Premier Division	27	5	4	0	1	0	0	0	32	5
Hibernian	1997–98	Scottish Premier Division	27	1	1	0	1	0	0	0	29	1
Hibernian	1998–99	Scottish First Division	2	1	0	0	1	0	0	0	3	1
Hibernian	Total		97	15	6	0	5	0	0	0	108	15
Derby County	1998–99	Premier League	27	1	3	1	3	0	0	0	33	2
Derby County	1999–2000	Premier League	5	0	0	0	3	0	0	0	8	0
Derby County	Total		32	1	3	1	6	0	0	0	41	2
Walsall (loan)	1999–2000	First Division	9	1	0	0	0	0	0	0	9	1
Portsmouth	1999–2000	First Division	12	2	0	0	0	0	0	0	12	2
Portsmouth	2000–01	First Division	24	2	1	0	0	0	0	0	25	2
Portsmouth	2001–02	First Division	39	1	1	0	1	0	0	0	41	1
Portsmouth	2002–03	First Division	37	4	1	0	2	0	0	0	40	4
Portsmouth	2003–04	Premier League	7	0	2	0	0	0	0	0	9	4
Portsmouth	2004–05	Premier League	0	0	0	0	1	0	0	0	1	0
Portsmouth	Total		119	9	5	0	4	0	0	0	128	9
Norwich City (loan)	2003–04	First Division	9	0	0	0	0	0	0	0	9	0
Leicester City (loan)	2004–05	Championship	2	0	0	0	0	0	0	0	2	0
Stoke City	2004–05	Championship	9	0	0	0	0	0	0	0	9	0
Stoke City	2005–06	Championship	14	1	2	0	1	0	0	0	17	1
Stoke City	2006–07	Championship	3	0	0	0	1	0	0	0	4	0
Stoke City	Total		26	1	2	0	2	0	0	0	30	1
Carlisle United (loan)	2006–07	League One	7	0	0	0	1	0	0	0	8	0
Walsall (loan)	2006–07	League One	10	4	0	0	0	0	0	0	10	4
Dunfermline Athletic	2007–08	Scottish First Division	15	4	1	0	0	0	2	0	18	4
Dunfermline Athletic	2008–09	Scottish First Division	14	1	0	0	4	0	0	0	18	1
Dunfermline Athletic	Total		29	5	1	0	4	0	2	0	36	5
Career total			340	36	17	1	22	0	2	0	381	37

== Managerial statistics ==
As of match played 7 March 2020

Team	Nat	From	To	Record							
Team	Nat	From	To	G	W	D	L	GF	GA	GD	Win %
Albion Rovers	(Scotland)	November 2018	May 2020	58	14	13	31	68	112	−44	24.14
Total				58	14	13	31	68	112	−44	24.14

== Honours ==
Portsmouth

- Football League First Division: 2002–03
