= McKey =

McKey may refer to:

- McKey, Oklahoma, census-designated place in Sequoyah County, Oklahoma, U.S.
- McKey (surname)
- McKey Sullivan (born 1988), American fashion model

== See also ==
- McKee (disambiguation)
- Mackey (disambiguation)
- Mackeys (disambiguation)
- McKay (disambiguation)
- Mackay (disambiguation)
