= Duncan MacKay =

Duncan MacKay or McKay may refer to:

- Duncan MacKay (footballer) (1937–2019), Scottish former footballer
- Duncan Mackay (musician) (born 1950), British composer, singer and musician
- Duncan McKay (TV presenter), Scottish television presenter and podcaster
- Mickey MacKay (Duncan McMillan MacKay, 1894–1940), Canadian ice hockey centre
- Duncan McKay, a character from Monarch of the Glen (TV series)
