= Craig McKay =

Craig McKay may refer to:

- Craig McKay (film editor), American film editor
- Craig McKay (cartoonist) (born 1966), American freelance illustrator
- Craig McKay (actor) (born 1973), English actor

== See also ==
- Craig Mackay (1927–2020), Canadian speed skater
