= The Cyclopedia of New Zealand =

Encyclopaedia published in New Zealand

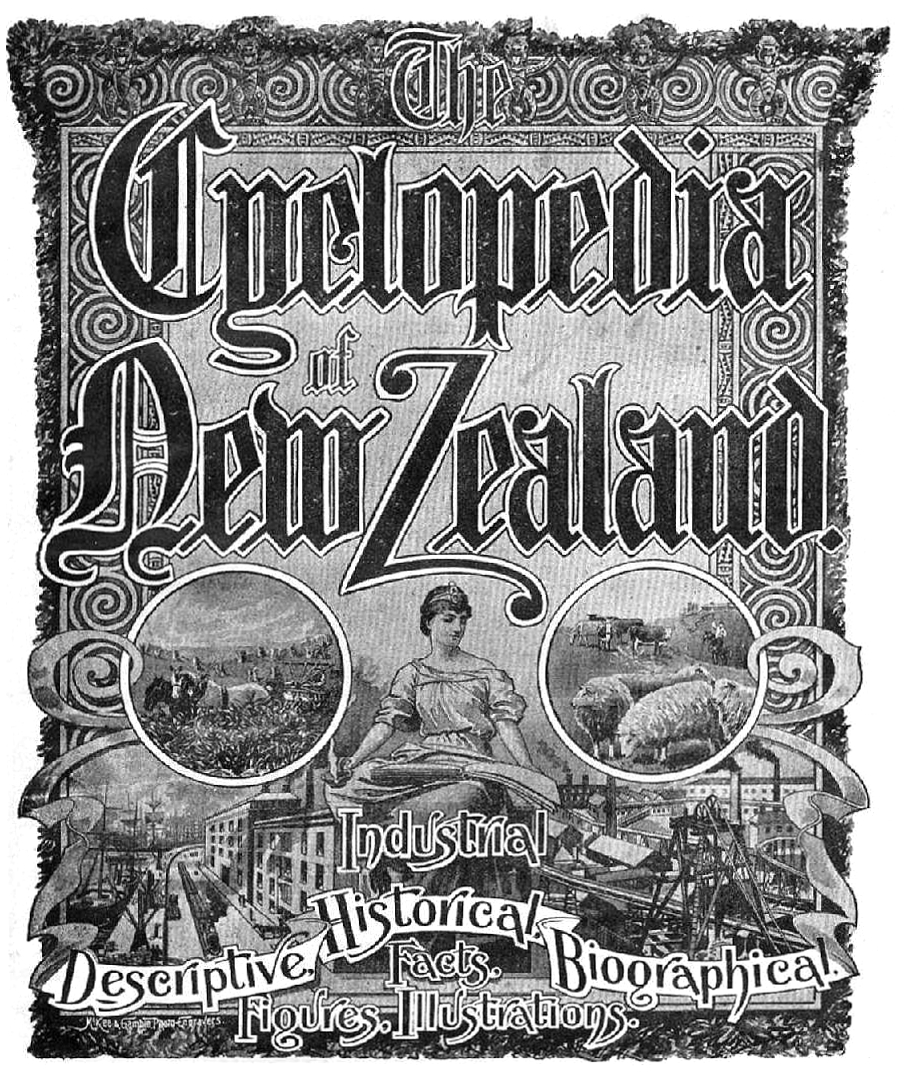
- Frontispiece from the Cyclopedia
- Editors: A. McKee, H. Gamble
- Language: English
- Subject: New Zealand – Encyclopedias
- Publisher: Cyclopedia Co. Ltd.
- Publication date: 1897–1908
- Publication place: New Zealand
- Media type: 6 volumes, hardbound; CDROM, Colonial CD Books, 2002; online, NZETC, 2008.
- OCLC: 18158442
- Dewey Decimal: 993.003
- LC Class: DU400 .C99
- Text: The Cyclopedia of New Zealand online

The Cyclopedia of New Zealand: industrial, descriptive, historical, biographical facts, figures, illustrations was an encyclopaedia published in New Zealand between 1897 and 1908 by the Cyclopedia Company Ltd. Arthur McKee was one of the original directors of the company that published The Cyclopedia, and his business partner H. Gamble worked with him on the first volume. Six volumes were published on the people, places and organisations of provinces of New Zealand. The Cyclopedia is an important historical resource. The volumes are arranged geographically, with each volume concerned with a specific region of New Zealand. Its breadth of coverage of many small towns and social institutions were poorly covered by contemporary newspapers and other sources. The first volume, which covered Wellington, also included the colonial government, politicians, governors, and public servants. The first volume was produced in Wellington, and the remaining volumes were produced in Christchurch. Much of its content was subsidised with contributor backing. Victoria University Electronic Text site reminds us that portraits are therefore generally glowing, and entries paid for by businesses are "unashamedly promotional". Similarly, they note that "individuals who would not or could not pay the fee required to feature in The Cyclopedia are not included—there are few entries for women, Māori or non-European settlers for example."

- Volume 1. Wellington Provincial District. Published 1897
- Volume 2. Auckland Provincial District. Published 1902
- Volume 3. Canterbury Provincial District. Published 1903
- Volume 4. Otago and Southland Provincial Districts. Published 1905
- Volume 5. Nelson, Marlborough and Westland Provincial Districts. Published 1906
- Volume 6. Taranaki, Hawke's Bay and Wellington Provincial Districts. Published 1908

The Cyclopedia of New Zealand was a predecessor of the more scholarly three-volume An Encyclopaedia of New Zealand published by the Government of New Zealand in 1966 and, later, of Te Ara: The Encyclopedia of New Zealand, a government-run, online encyclopaedia, established in 2002.

The Cyclopedia was digitised by the New Zealand Electronic Text Centre in 2008–2009.
