= Craig G. Telfer =

British TV Presenter

- Born: Craig Gordon Telfer; Rutherglen, Scotland
- Years active: 2013–present
- Career
- Show: A View from the Terrace (2019–present)
- Station: BBC Scotland

Craig G. Telfer is a Scottish television presenter and podcaster. He hosts Scottish football magazine and factual television television series A View from the Terrace.

== Career ==
Telfer started his own sports journalism website called 'Tell Him He's Pele' in 2012. He later started the podcast series 'The Pele Podcast' in which he interviewed lower league Scottish football players.

He joined the cast of the long-running podcast 'The Terrace', which covers the latest goings on in the SPFL. In 2019, an adaptation of the podcast was made into a television show, A View from the Terrace, and launched in the opening week of the new BBC Scotland channel.

== Personal life ==
Telfer is a fan of Stenhousemuir, and was the club stadium announcer for a short spell.

He was a pupil at Larbert High School.

He works for Glasgow Caledonian University as a video communications officer.
