= Lake Mackay (disambiguation) =

Lake Mackay is a salt lake in Australia.

Lake Mackay may also refer to.

- Lake Mackay hare-wallaby, an extinct Australian animal species
- Lake Mackay, Northern Territory, a locality in Australia

== See also ==
- MacKay Lake (Northwest Territories)
- Mackay (disambiguation)
