= Thomas McKay (disambiguation) =

Thomas McKay (1792–1855) was a Scottish-born Canadian businessman and co-founder of Ottawa, Ontario.

Thomas or Tom McKay may also refer to:

- Thomas McKay (fur trader) (1796–1849), Canadian fur trader and early settler of Oregon
- Thomas McKay (Canadian politician) (1839–1912), Canadian member of Parliament and senator
- Thomas E. McKay (1875–1958), Utah politician and leader in The Church of Jesus Christ of Latter-day Saints
- Thomas McKay (Northwest Territories politician) (1849–1924), Canadian Anglo-Métis politician and first mayor of Prince Albert, Saskatchewan
- Thomas McKay (Australian politician) (1909–2004), golfer and politician in New South Wales
- Thomas McKay (Alaska politician), American politician
- Thomas McKay (gunner) (died 2005), known as "Tam the Gun", gunner at Edinburgh Castle's One O'Clock Gun
- Thomas J. McKay, professor of philosophy at Syracuse University, New York
- Tom McKay (athlete) (1900–1978), Canadian Olympic runner
- Tom McKay (footballer) (born 1938), Australian rules footballer
- Tom McKay (actor) (born 1979), British actor

== See also ==
- Thomas Mackay (1849–1912), British wine merchant
- Tom MacKay (1911–1986), Australian rules footballer
- Thomas Cooper, 1st Baron Cooper of Culross (Thomas Mackay Cooper, 1892–1956), Scottish politician, judge and historian
