= Jack McKay =

Jack McKay may refer to:

- Jack McKay (footballer, born 1885) (1885–?), English football outside left for Hebburn Argyle, Birmingham and Blyth Spartans
- Jack McKay (footballer, born 1996), Scottish football forward for York City
- Jack McKay (coach) (1886–?), American college football and basketball coach

== See also ==
- John MacKay (disambiguation)
- John Mackey (disambiguation)
- John Mackie (disambiguation)
- John McKay (disambiguation)
