= Beaver Run (County Line Branch) =

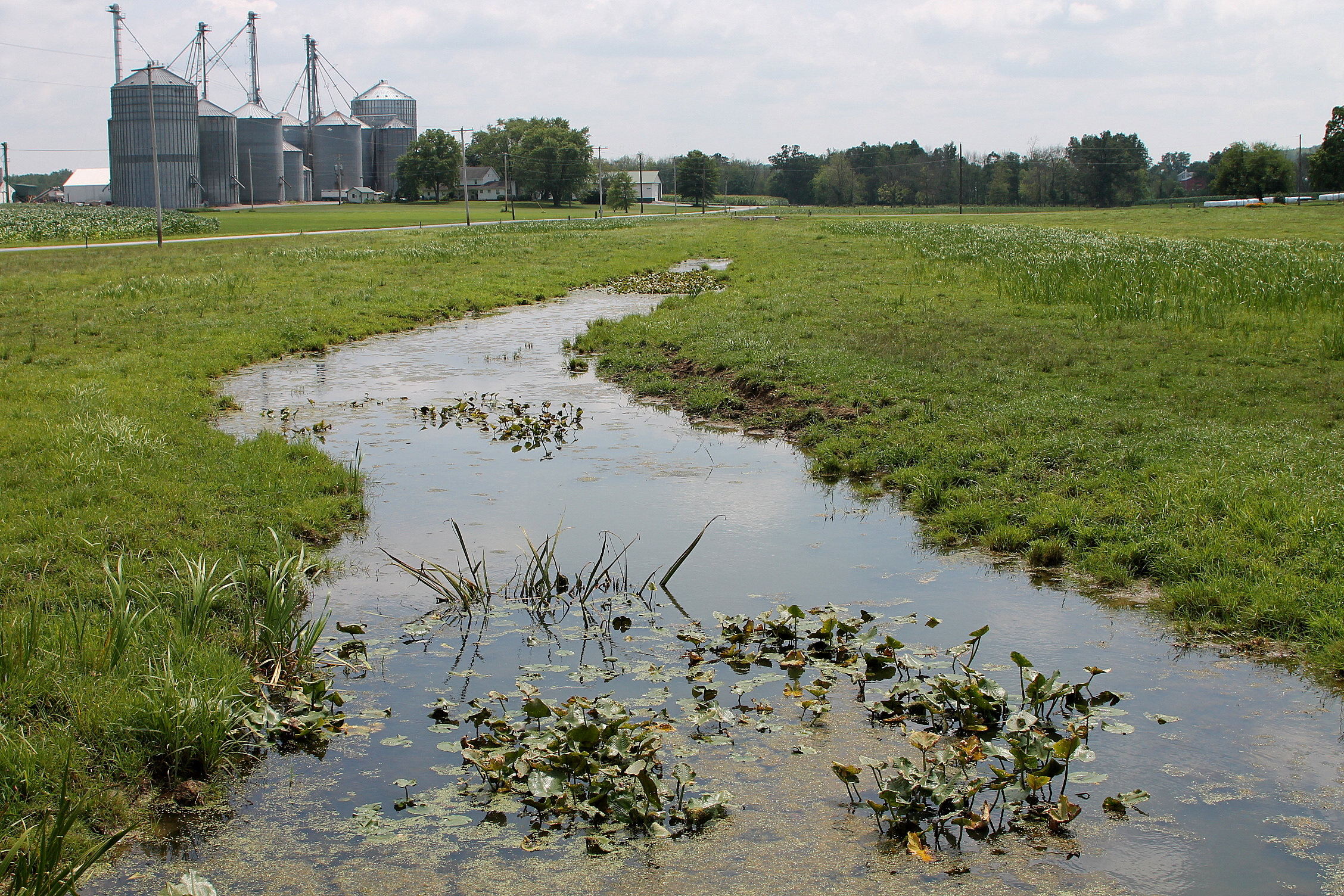
- Beaver Run looking downstream near Turbotville

Physical characteristics
- Source
  - location: eastern Lewis Township, Northumberland County, Pennsylvania
- Mouth
  - location: County Line Branch in Limestone Township, Montour County, Pennsylvania
  - coordinates: 41°05′07″N 76°42′33″W
  - elevation: 535 ft (163 m)
- Length: 3.9 mi (6.3 km)

Basin features
- Progression: County Line Branch → West Branch Chillisquaque Creek → Chillisquaque Creek → West Branch Susquehanna River → Susquehanna River → Chesapeake Bay

Beaver Run is a tributary of County Line Branch in Northumberland County and Montour County, in Pennsylvania, in the United States. It is approximately 3.9 miles (6.3 km) long and flows through Lewis Township in Northumberland County and Anthony Township in Montour County. The watershed of the stream mostly consists of agricultural land. The watershed lies over rock of the Onondaga and Old Port Formation, the Keyser and Tonoloway Formation, and the Hamilton Group. It lies over soil of the Chanango-Pope-Holly series, the Hagerstown-Edom-Washington series, and the Watson-Berks-Alvira series. The stream experiences siltation and organic enrichment.

A. Joseph Armstrong described Beaver Run as "small and overgrown" in his book Trout Unlimited's Guide to Pennsylvania Limestone Streams.

== Course ==
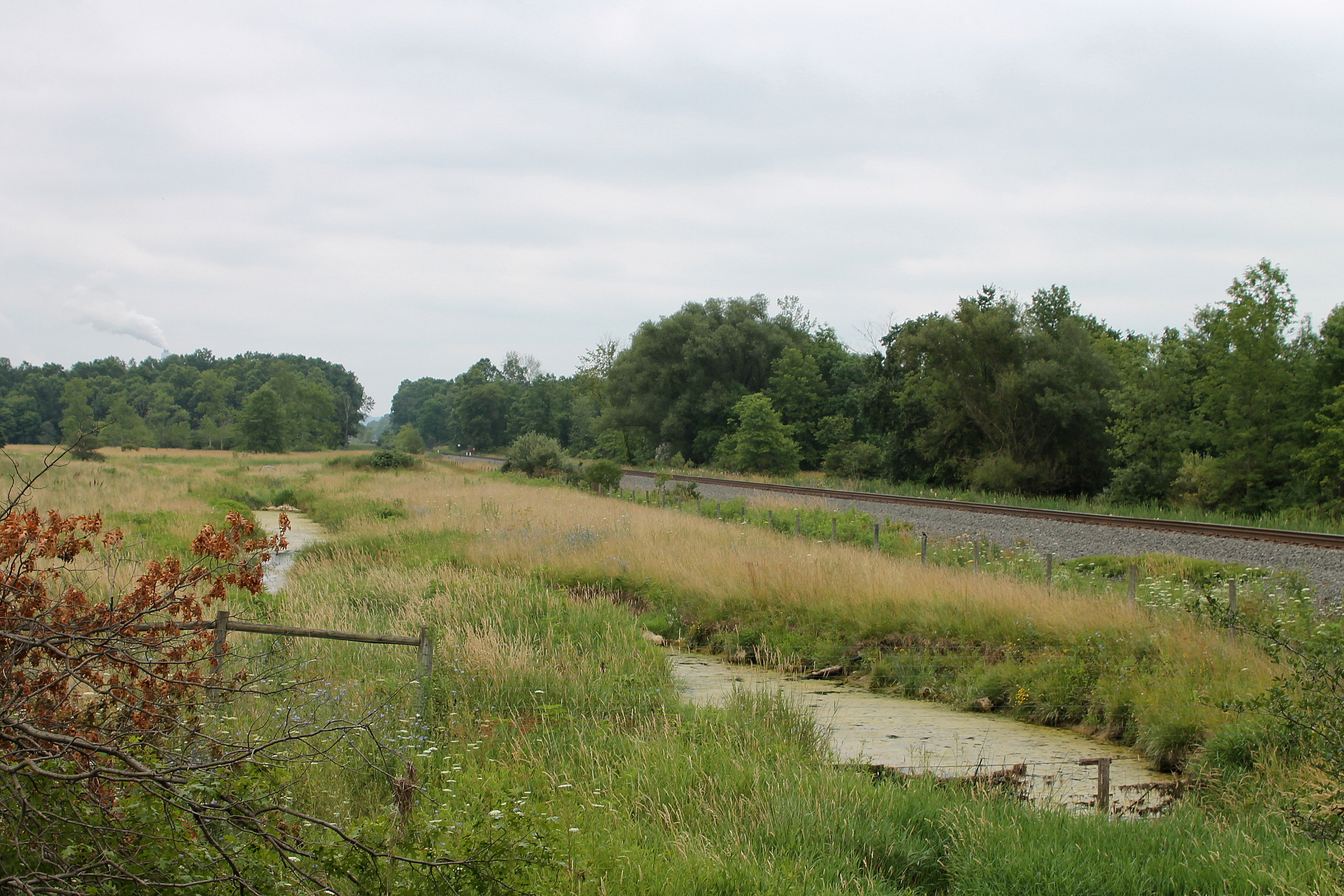
Beaver Run looking downstream

Beaver Run begins in eastern Lewis Township, Northumberland County. It flows southeast for a short distance before turning southwest and then south. The stream then crosses Pennsylvania Route 44 and Pennsylvania Route 54 before crossing a Conrail railroad and turning southeast. It flows in this direction for some distance before passing by the community of Schuyler and leaving Lewis Township.

Upon leaving Lewis Township, Beaver Run enters Limestone Township, Montour County. Here it turns east for a short distance and then turns southeast. The stream then crosses a set of railroad tracks and further downstream reaches its confluence with County Line Branch near the eastern border of Limestone Township.

== Hydrology ==
Portions of Beaver Run and its tributaries are affected by siltation and organic enrichment due to agriculture. The entirety of the stream and its tributaries are listed as "not attaining" in the 305B Stream Listings.

The water of Beaver Run is relatively warm.

Beaver Run has low levels of dissolved oxygen.

== Geography and geology ==
The watershed of Beaver Run is in the Appalachian Mountain section of the ridge and valley physiographic region.

Most of Beaver Run and the area in its vicinity lies over rock of the Onondaga and Old Port Formation. However, the southern part of the watershed is on rock of the Keyser and Tonoloway Formation and the upper reaches of the watershed, including some of the northern tributaries, lies over Hamilton Group rock.

The soils in a small area in the lower reaches of the watershed of Beaver Run are of the Chenango-Pope-Holly soil series. The stream's southern tributaries and the rest of the lower and middle reaches of the watershed are on soil of the Hagerstown-Edom-Washington series. The upper reaches of the watershed lie over the Watson-Berks-Alvira soil series. Hydric soils also occur on the stream.

Beaver Run is not influenced by limestone.

The elevation of Beaver Run near its mouth is 535 feet (163 m) above sea level.

== Watershed ==
Nearly all of the watershed of Beaver Run is agricultural land. However, there are some small patches of forested land. In addition to the townships that the stream flows through, the community of Turbotville is also in the watershed.

There are 16.85 miles (27.12 km) of streams in the watershed of Beaver Run.

The Beaver Run Bridge was built over Beaver Run in its lower reaches in 1915. It is a closed-spandrel arch bridge that is 48.9 feet (14.9 m) long. The bridge is open to traffic.

== Biology ==
Beaver Run has been described as overgrown. The Montour County Natural Areas Inventory recommends planting native trees along the stream.

== See also ==
- McKee Run, next tributary of County Line Branch going downstream
- List of rivers of Pennsylvania
