= County Line Branch =

Stream in Pennsylvania, US

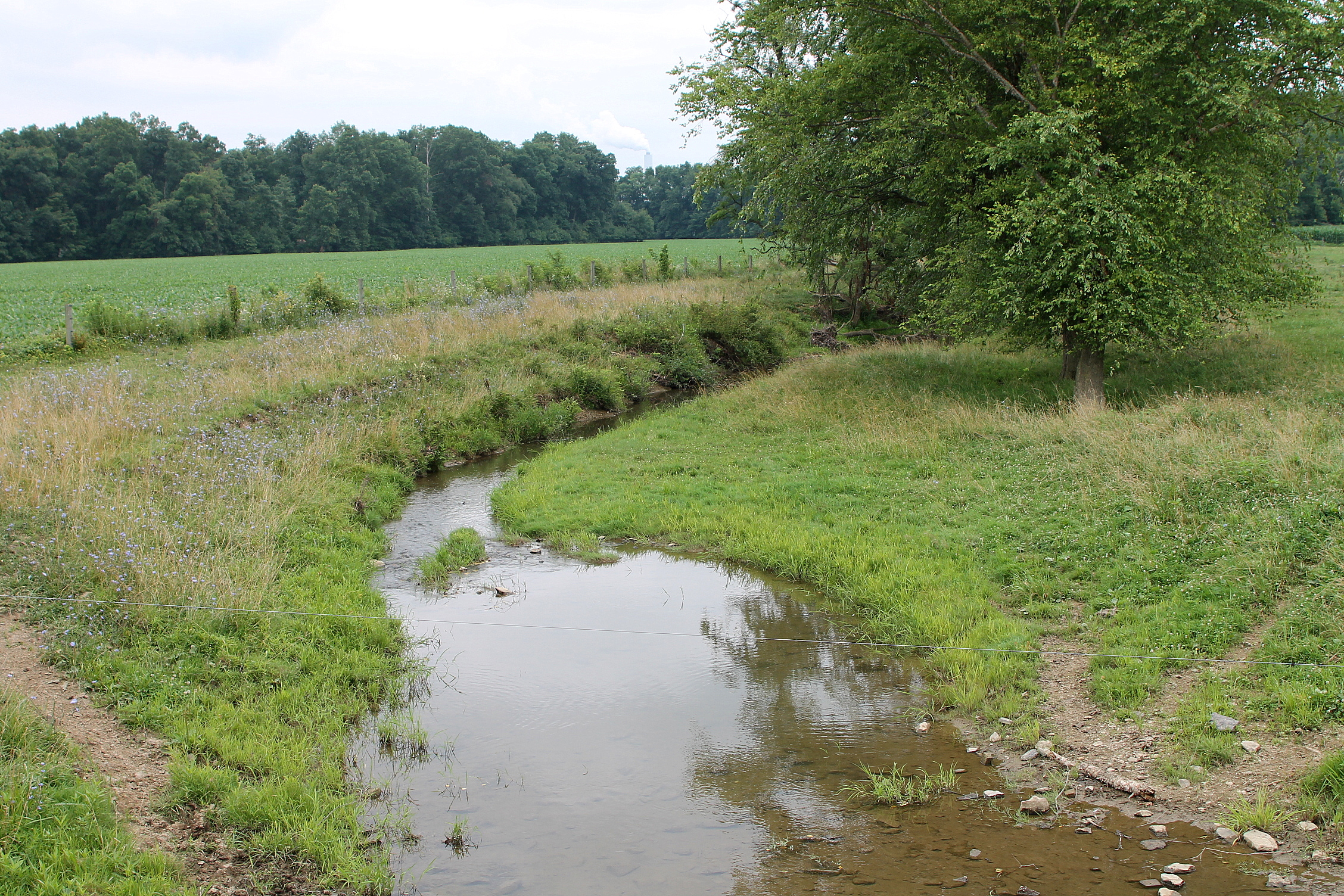
- County Line Branch in Northumberland County

Physical characteristics
- Source
  - location: Muncy Hills in Anthony Township, Montour County, Pennsylvania/Lewis Township, Northumberland County, Pennsylvania
- Mouth
  - location: West Branch Chillisquaque Creek in Anthony Township, Montour County, Pennsylvania
  - coordinates: 41°04′46″N 76°41′10″W
  - elevation: 518 ft (158 m)
- Length: 8.9 mi (14.3 km)
- Basin size: 8.97 mi^{2} (23.2 km^{2})

Basin features
- Progression: West Branch Chillisquaque Creek → Chillisquaque Creek → West Branch Susquehanna River → Susquehanna River → Chesapeake Bay
- Tributaries
  - left: McKee Run
  - right: Beaver Run

County Line Branch (also known as the County Line Branch of Chillisquaque Creek) is a tributary of West Branch Chillisquaque Creek in Northumberland County and Montour County, in Pennsylvania, in the United States. It is approximately 8.9 miles (14.3 km) long and flows through Lewis Township in Northumberland County and Anthony and Limestone Townships in Montour County. The stream's watershed has an area of 8.97 square miles. Its tributaries include Beaver Run and McKee Run.

The main rock formations in the watershed of County Line Branch are the Hamilton Group, the Onondaga and Old Port Formation, the Trimmers Rock Formation, and the Keyser and Tonoloway Formation. The soil series in the watershed include the Chenango-Pope-Holly series, the Berks-Weikert-Beddington series, the Hagerstown-Edom-Washington series, and the Watson-Berks-Alvira series. Industries in the watershed include agriculture and timbering. The Mountour County Natural Heritage Inventory lists the headwaters of County Line Branch as a "locally significant" site.

== Course ==
County Line Branch begins near the border between Anthony Township, Montour County and Lewis Township, Northumberland County, near the northern borders of both townships. The headwaters are in the Muncy Hills. The stream flows south for several miles with few turns, following the Northumberland/Montour County line. Eventually it makes a sharp turn southeast and leaves the county line. Upon leaving the county line, the stream begins flowing roughly parallel to the border between Anthony Township and Limestone Township, Montour County. During this stretch, the stream crosses Pennsylvania Route 44 and Pennsylvania Route 54 and at the southern edge of the stretch, it receives the tributary Beaver Run. It then turns northeast into Anthony Township, where it picks up the tributary McKee Run. The stream then turns southeast and reaches its confluence with West Branch Chillisquaque Creek at the southern edge of Anthony Township.

County Line Branch joins West Branch Chillisquaque Creek 1.1 miles (1.8 km) upstream of its mouth.

=== Tributaries ===
Tributaries of County Line Branch include Beaver Run and McKee Run. The stream also has unnamed tributaries.

== Hydrology ==
The entirety of County Line Branch and the entirety of each of its tributaries is considered by the Pennsylvania Department of Environmental Protection to be impaired. The stream and a number of its tributaries are affected by siltation due to agriculture.

== Geography and geology ==
County Line Branch has an elevation of 518 feet (158 m) at its mouth.

Much of the southern part of the watershed of County Line Branch lies over rock of the Onondaga and Old Port Formation. Some of the southern part of the watershed, however, is over rock of the Keyser and Tonoloway Formation. Most of the middle reaches of the watershed are on rock of the Hamilton Group and the uppermost and northernmost reaches of the watershed are on the Trimmers Rock Formation.

There are several soil series in the watershed of County Line Branch. The Chenango-Pope-Holly series is found in a small part of the lowest reaches of the watershed, near the stream's mouth. The Hagerstown-Edom-Washington series is found in a much larger area in the southern part of the watershed. The Watson-Berks-Alvira series occurs in the watershed's middle reaches and the Berks-Weikert-Beddington series is found near the headwaters and also on its southwestern edge.

There is glacial till in the watershed of County Line Branch.

== Watershed ==
The watershed of County Line Branch has an area of 8.97 square miles. Much of the watershed is in Anthony and Limestone Townships in Montour County, but a significant portion of it is in Lewis Township, Northumberland County. The watershed also occupies part of Turbotville. Its northern edge is on the border of Lycoming County.

The headwaters of County Line Branch and their vicinity are mostly forested. However, nearly all of the rest of it is agricultural land. There is little development anywhere in the watershed.

== History and industries ==
An site called the Pulsifer Site (also known as Site 36Mo79) is a prehistoric archaeological site on a stream terrace of County Line Branch. 32 artifacts have been unearthed at the site, 31 of which are chert flakes. The other artifact is a biface. The material of these artifacts are dissimilar to the bedrock in the area. Some of these artifacts date to the Archaic period and the Transitional period.

Agriculture and timbering are done in the upper reaches of the watershed of County Line Branch.

== Biology ==
A large number of native plants and animals live at the headwaters of County Line Branch. There are also forests at the headwaters, which are part of a large tract of forested land.

The Mountour County Natural Heritage Inventory lists the headwaters of County Line Branch as a "locally significant" site.

There are 12 tree species at the headwaters of County Line Branch. These include three maple species, two oak species, and two birch species. There is also a large population of American beech trees. Shrubs in this area include witch hazel, blackberry, spicebush, and mountain laurel. There are also 23 herb species, including Christmas fern, Indian cucumber, veined skullcap, fleabane, wild sarsaparilla, and numerous others.

There are three salamander species inhabiting the headwaters of County Line Branch: the redback salamander, the northern spring salamander, and the northern two-lined salamander. Stoneflies and fireflies also live in the area. There are also ten species of birds at the stream's headwaters, including warblers, thrushes, woodpeckers, and others.

There are some invasive species near the source of County Line Branch. Beech bark disease could potentially affect the beech trees in this area as well.

== See also ==
- List of rivers of Pennsylvania
