= Mackeys =

Mackeys may refer to two unincorporated communities in the United States:

- Mackeys, Missouri
- Mackeys, North Carolina

== See also ==
- Mackey (disambiguation)
- Mackay (disambiguation)
- McKay (disambiguation)
- McKey (disambiguation)
