= George Mackie =

George Mackie may refer to:

- George Mackie, Baron Mackie of Benshie (1919–2015), Scottish Liberal politician
- George Owen Mackie (1929–2023), British–Canadian zoologist
- George Mackie (footballer) (born 1954), Scottish footballer
- George Mackie (book designer), book designer and Royal Designer for Industry
- George Mackie (rugby union) (1949–2020), Scottish rugby union player

== See also ==
- George Mackey (1916–2006), mathematician
- George Mackay (disambiguation)
