= A View from the Terrace =

Scottish football television series

- Based on: The Terrace: Scottish Football Podcast
- Directed by: Jordan Laird
- Presented by: Craig G. Telfer
- Starring: Craig Fowler; Joel Sked; Shaughan McGuigan; Robert Borthwick; Graeme Thewliss; Ray Bradshaw; Sean Hamilton; Tony Anderson; Amy Canavan; Duncan McKay; Duncan Cowles
- Opening theme: "The Late 90s" – Ella's Brother
- Country of origin: Scotland
- Original language: English
- No. of seasons: 9
- No. of episodes: 146 (up to 9 October 2026)

Production
- Executive producers: Ian Greenhill, David Harron
- Producers: Andy Maas, Michael Dart, Neil Sargent
- Camera setup: Multi-Camera
- Running time: 58 minutes, 44 minutes (from series 8), 28 minutes (from series 9)
- Production company: Studio Something

Original release
- Network: BBC Scotland
- Release: 1 March 2019 – present

A View from the Terrace is a Scottish football magazine and factual television series hosted by Craig G. Telfer. It is broadcast weekly on BBC Scotland and repeated on BBC One in Scotland throughout the football season.

The show is produced by creative agency Studio Something and is adapted from the long-running podcast The Terrace.

== History ==
The origins of the show stem from The Terrace podcast created by Craig Fowler, Alan Temple, Jen McLean and Niall McNeill, while studying journalism at Napier University in 2007.

The show, based on the original podcast, was launched in March 2019, in the opening week of the new BBC Scotland channel. It is hosted by Craig G. Telfer and features the recurring cast of Craig Fowler, Joel Sked, Shaughan McGuigan and Robert Borthwick, along with regular guest appearances from Amy Canavan, Graeme Thewliss and Tony Anderson.

The panel take a loving and scathing look at Scottish football from the top of the leagues to the bottom as well as exploring the culture that surrounds the game in Scotland. Each show is built around studio debate as well as number of outside VTs that further explore the culture of the game. These films take the form of observational documentaries, light-entertainment pastiches, short films, archive features, spoken word, animation, musical performances and scripted drama.

The most common features used in the show are "The Boyata Index", "On The Fence", "Time Capsule", "See Ya Later Debater", "Jobberography" and "Larsson and Scheidt".

== Episodes ==
The original 10-part series was extended to 13 episodes to take the show up to the eve of the 2019 Scottish Cup Final. In Episode 6 of series 1, originally broadcast on the 5th April, 2019, a short film about football on the island of Eriskay went viral, amassing more than 2m views on Facebook alone. The popularity of the film helped establish the show in its early days. In August 2024, drinks giant Guinness launched an advertising campaign for Guinness 0.0 which borrowed heavily from the original film featured on A View From The Terrace. Producers on the show advised Guinness during the early production of the advert.

Each episode of the first series closed with a popular Scottish musician or band playing a version of one of their team's most famous songs. Some of the artists to perform have been Admiral Fallow, Fatherson, HYYTS, STPHNX and We Were Promised Jetpacks. This feature was used intermittently in following series. The show also began to curate archive-based love letters to some of Scottish football's most iconic moments, using fan voices to tell those stories with features including St. Johnstone's famous Scottish Cup win and the Scottish Women National Team's send off at Hampden ahead of the 2019 Women's World Cup.

The show was recommissioned by BBC for a second season of 20 episodes and returned on 27 September 2019. Following the abrupt end to the 2019–20 season due to the COVID-19 pandemic, a compilation show entitled The Best of A View from the Terrace was screened. Additionally, the show's team continued to create similar output via their long-running podcast, including a series of shows entitled A View from the Lockdown, where the presenters took popular elements from the television show to discuss non-football-related topics.

The third run of the show launched in October 2020, navigating a UK-wide lockdown to produce 20 episodes. The fourth began in October 2021; it included more guest panellists than previous seasons, including podcast regular Graeme Thewliss and comedian Ray Bradshaw.

Following Scotland Men's National Team's qualification for the delayed Euro 2020 Championships in 2021, a 3-part spin off titled A View from the Euros was aired to accompany the tournament. Applying the show's trademark humour and style with a continental twist, it celebrated what it meant to be Scottish as the national side returned to major tournament football. During A View from the Euros, famous Scottish football songs were covered in different genres from countries partaking in the Euros competition. For example The Proclaimers' "I'm Gonna Be (500 Miles)" was played by a Spanish flamenco band.

After the end of Series 4, it was announced that A View From The Terrace would be performing a live end-of-season review show at St. Luke's in Glasgow. The show (which was not televised) saw many of the regular features (See Ya Later, Debater and Future Headlines) as well as a special edition of the Club Shop where audience members had the chance to win a Peterhead branded bottle of hand sanitiser, a diamanté Raith Rovers shirt, and a Buckie Thistle torch keyring. The show featured all the regular contributors bar Bradshaw and Hamilton, as well as two special guests in the form of Marvin Bartley and Dylan Easton.

Series 5 ran for 20 episodes between the 30th September, 2022, and 28 May 2023, with the show's usual winter break included. This series included a film entitled 'When We Were Famous - Scotland '72', which told the story of the first women's international match between Scotland and England played at Ravenscraig in 1972. The film won an RTS Scotland Award for Best Short Form feature.

The show's sixth series started on 29 September 2023 and included, for the first time on TV, a number of episodes recorded in front of a live studio audience. The show's 100th episode was broadcast on 24 November 2023, with the previous episode having been recorded with a live audience in Greenock and the following one in Edinburgh.

To celebrate the show's fifth anniversary (towards the end of series 6, in March 2024), drinks giant Tennent's released a limited edition beer under its Drygate brand called A Brew From The Terrace. The stout, which was brewed using real Bovril, was described as 'bold and beefy' and 'football in a bottle', and was inspired by the Scottish football tradition of consuming a pie and Bovril on the terraces. The beer was described as 'one of the most eagerly awaited releases ever at Drygate'.

At the end of series 7 in May 2025, it was reported in the media that, despite being 'a beloved fixture for Scottish football fans', the show was yet to be recommissioned by the BBC and its future 'hung in the balance'. Later that year it was announced that the show would indeed return for an eighth series.

Series 8 began on 3 October 2025. The runtime was reduced from 58 minutes to 44 minutes, and the number of episodes was cut from 20 to 18. The number of panel members joining Craig G. Telfer was also reduced, from three to two. As part of the overall changes, production moved from West Lothian to Glasgow. Series 9 began on 9 October 2026, with a further-reduced runtime of 28 minutes.

Amid a backdrop of large scale budget cuts at the BBC and the reported closure of the BBC Scotland channel, A View From The Terrace was recommissioned for a 9th series in summer 2026 and debuted on 9th October. The show's budget and run time had been cut again, this time to 28 minutes, but the lineup and content remained largely unchanged.

Throughout the program's run they have conducted interviews with some of the most well known faces in Scottish football, like former national team managers Craig Brown, Craig Levein and Shelley Kerr, Scotland internationals like Ben Gannon-Doak,Colin Hendry, Kenny Miller, Duncan Ferguson, Ian Murray, Gemma Fay, Rachel Corsie, John Robertson, Shaun Maloney, Andrew Considine, Stephen O'Donnell, Ryan Porteous, Kevin Thomson and Lee Miller, as well as others like Archie Knox, Brian Graham, Dougie Imrie, Rory Loy, David Martindale, Jack Ross, Tony Watt, Jim Leishman, Scott Allan, Mixu Paatelainen, Arild Stavrum, Keith Lasley, James Grady, Dylan McGeouch, Michael Stewart, Nacho Novo and Rose Reilly

== Regular features ==
Throughout the run of programme there have been many sections that have appeared throughout every series and often several episodes in the same series. These include:

- Social Media Section: For the first three series of the programme the four hosts were joined by Robert Borthwick for a whistle-stop tour of the best parts of Scottish football social media from the past week. After the decision to rotate the cast on an episode-to-episode basis, Telfer and the panel would go through the social media section together as a group. During the festive period, this section often included a look into what Scottish clubs were selling as Christmas gifts such as St Mirren F.C. lip balm, an Aberdeen F.C. cat flap or the notorious Raith Rovers F.C. ''Roaring Back'' mugs from their doomed attempt to escape from League 1 in 2017-18.
- Put A Shift In: Documentary filmmaker Duncan Cowles is not a fan of football, but his friend Duncan McKay is, and wants to try out as many different roles related to football as possible. Duncan and Duncan travel the length and breadth of the country trying out different jobs at all levels of football. Some of the highlights have included taking on the role of Raith Rovers mascot Roary the Lion at Stark's Park, being a ballboy at Hampden Park, a commentator for an Airdrieonians F.C. match and assistant manager at Caledonian Braves F.C..
- The Boyata Index: Based upon the hypothetical valuation of £50million set on Celtic defender Dedryck Boyata by pundit John Hartson, the panel speculated as to how much players throughout the SPFL would cost using the same barometer. These included that Stephen Dobbie was worth £150million and that Oliver Burke was worth a bag of balls.
- The Gaffer: Shining the spotlight on managers throughout Scottish football, like Shadab Iftikhar, the first South-Asian to manage any Scottish football club, former Albion Rovers F.C. manager Kevin Harper, University of Stirling head coach Chris Geddes, or Bailey Hanlon, manager of Kilsyth Athletic and youngest manager of a football club in Scotland at 22 years old.
- Scottish Passport: Interviews with Scottish players currently playing in leagues outside of the UK, such as Lana Clelland during her time at Fiorentina and Steven Lennon, who was playing in Iceland.
- Home: A closer look at the stadiums and pitches that clubs around Scotland call home. Some of the most memorable films have included smaller clubs like Eriskay F.C., Orkney Women's F.C. and Campbeltown A.F.C.
- Guest Interviews: The show has often featured guest appearance and interviews with current and former players.
- The Banker (originally Bank or Bust): The panellists predict results from the upcoming weekend fixture card and get points over the course of a season. For the first three series the 4 panellists each made three predictions every week and the individual player with the most points at the end of the series took home the Eamonn Brophy Lone Wolf Trophy. Then from series four, Craig C. Telfer played against the other panellists in each episode as a team (who were given a different humorous team name each week), Telfer making three predictions and the others one each, reduced to two each side in series eight with the smaller panel. Either Telfer or the team would win the trophy. Additional rules are occasionally thrown in to gain bonus points or make the game a little more challenging.
- Last Minute Winner: Songs associated with specific football teams are played by bands or artists who are fans of that club, such as Hibs fan Louis Abbott of Admiral Fallow performing Sunshine on Leith or Dunfermline-based band The Skids performing Into the Valley. Later on, this feature began to include fan stories from memorable moments in Scottish football history such as St Johnstone F.C. winning their first ever piece of silverware in 2014 or Queen of the South F.C. reaching the Scottish Cup semi-final in 2008, and also short interviews with club legends about past glories such as Colin Hendry on what it was like to captain his country or Jim Leishman talking about his playing career and then his managerial career with Dunfermline.
- The Light Box: A light box on the wall behind the panel shows various sayings, phrases or film quotes throughout each episode.

== Appearances ==
After the successful appearance of Graeme Thewliss during A View From The Euros, more regular contributors and friends of the show were invited to contribute. To date, host Craig G. Telfer has appeared in all but one of the studio shows (A View From The Euros, Episode 3) due to a positive COVID-19 test. However he did appear briefly via video call. In Series 2 and 3, there were a total of 3 Best Of episodes, as Telfer introduced the best clips from the previous series alone in the studio.

Robert Borthwick only appeared in the regular ″Social Media Review″ section for the first three series, until he became a more regular panellist from Episode 3 of A View From The Euros onwards.

Before becoming a more regular contributor, Graeme Thewliss made two appearances in the earlier series of the show, in a section called ″Come Consi-Dine With Me″ where a famous footballer taught him to cook their speciality. These included making sushi with former Heart of Midlothian F.C. and Dundee United F.C. player Ryan McGowan and baking empire biscuits with Motherwell F.C. player Stephen O'Donnell.

Podcast contributor Gary Cocker made three appearances in the early series, interviewing players in informal settings for a feature called ″First Mates″. Cocker played chess with Hamilton Academical F.C. and Partick Thistle F.C. player Ziggy Gordon, a former child chess champion; he met former Heart of Midlothian player Oliver Bozanic at Gorgie City Farm, and he interviewed former Hamilton Academical F.C. player Steve Davies in an escape room.

== Controversies ==
In 2022, journalist Kevin McKenna defended the show after criticism from some Celtic F.C. fans about the panel's views on the club's supporters. McKenna claimed that he 'laughed out loud at this section of the show', and encouraged his fellow Celtic supporters to have a sense of humour saying 'it's completely okay for fans of other clubs to have a laugh (at Celtic fans)'. On other occasions, some critics have pointed to the fact that three of the original five panel members were Heart of Midlothian supporters as proof of a bias towards Heart of Midlothian F.C.

In 2024, Lowland League side Albion Rovers announced that they would allow a Hibernian F.C. fan, Duncan Mckay, to replace Sandy Clark as manager for one match, as part of a feature to be filmed for A View From The Terrace. The announcement was met with a widespread backlash from supporters and just days later Rovers announced that they were scrapping the idea. A View From The Terrace aired the film in any case, with Mckay arriving at the ground on match day to discover he had been 'sacked', and instead watching the game from the stands with supporters.

In 2025, the show aired a short film featuring historian Ged O'Brien and a team of archaeologists from Archaeology Scotland, claiming to have discovered the site of the oldest known football pitch in the world, in Anwoth, Dumfries and Galloway. The discovery, if true, had the potential to rewrite the accepted origin story of football, suggesting that the game may have originated in Scotland, rather than England, as often claimed. The film made headlines worldwide, causing significant discussion and controversy.

In March 2026 the original The Terrace podcast was acquired by Newsquest, the second largest publisher of regional newspapers in the UK, most recognised in Scotland for owning The Herald (Glasgow) newspaper. The deal was described by founder Craig Fowler as 'lucrative'. However, since the BBC television show A View From The Terrace and the podcast The Terrace are editorially independent of each other, it was unclear whether this deal would have an impact on the show or its output.

== Reception ==
The show has been described as "quietly but bravely pushing boundaries" and "injecting the fun back into football on the TV for the first time since Baddiel and Skinner's Fantasy Football League". Kevin McKenna in The Observer described it as "the best football show on UK television by far". Football periodical Mundial described it as "the reason why you should give a shit about Scottish football" and BBC Scotland credited it as being a part of the "new wave of fan led football content".

The show has been nominated for several awards during its run, including a Broadcast 2020 Award for Best Sports Programme and a RTS Scotland Award for Sports Programme in 2025. In 2023, a film about the first women's international match between Scotland and England in 1972 won Best Short Form feature at the RTS Scotland Awards.
