= McKay (disambiguation) =

McKay is a surname. It may also refer to:

== Places ==
- McKay Cliffs, part of the Geologists mountain range, Ross Dependency, Antarctica
- Mount McKay (Australia), Victoria, Australia
- Mount McKay, Ontario, Canada
- McKay Lake (Pic River), Ontario
- McKay Township, Ontario
- McKay Bay, Florida, United States
- McKay Lake (Minnesota), United States
- McKay, Oregon, United States, an unincorporated community
- McKay Park, Bend, Oregon
- McKay Reservoir, Oregon
- McKay Ridge, Washington, United States

== People and fictional characters ==
- McKay (given name)

== Buildings in the United States ==
- The McKay, an apartment building in Indianapolis, Indiana
- McKay Events Center, original name of the UCCU Center, a multi-purpose arena on the campus of Utah Valley University
- McKay Tower, an office building in Grand Rapids, Michigan

== See also ==
- MacKay (disambiguation)
