= Mackay =

Mackay may refer to:

- Clan Mackay, the Scottish clan from which the surname "MacKay" derives

Mackay may also refer to:

== Places ==
=== Australia ===
- Mackay Region, a local government area
  - Mackay, Queensland, a city in the above region
    - Mackay Airport, in the above city
    - Mackay railway station
  - Electoral district of Mackay, Queensland, Australia

=== Canada ===
- Fort MacKay, Alberta
- MacKay, Alberta
- A. Murray MacKay Bridge, in Halifax, Nova Scotia

=== United States ===
- Mackay, Idaho, a city in Custer County

== People and fictional characters ==
- Aeneas James George Mackay (1839–1911), Scottish lawyer and historical writer
- Aeneas Mackay Jr. (1838–1909), prime minister of the Netherlands
- Buddy MacKay (1933–2024), American politician and diplomat
- Charles Mackay (1814–1889), Scottish poet
- Daniel MacKay (born 2001), Scottish footballer
- David J. C. MacKay (1967–2016), British physicist and mathematician
- Derek Mackay (born 1977), SNP politician
- Donald MacCrimmon MacKay (1922–1987), British physicist
- George Leslie Mackay (1844–1901), Canadian Presbyterian missionary
- George Robert Aberigh-Mackay (1848–1881), Anglo-Indian writer
- Harper MacKay (1921-1995), American pianist and composer
- John Bain Mackay (1795–1888), nurseryman of Clapton, London
- John Henry Mackay (1864-1933), German anarchist writer
- Mariellen MacKay, American politician
- Robert Sinclair MacKay (born 1956), British mathematician
- Shena Mackay (born 1944), Scottish author
- McKay as surname (list of people)
- McKay (given name)

== Other ==
- Mackay Memorial Hospital, named in George Leslie Mackay, a medical centers in Taiwan
  - Shuanglian metro station, where deputy station name is Mackay Memorial Hospital station, a metro station of the Taipei Metro
- Mackay Trophy, named in honour of Clarence Mackay, awarded annually by the US Air Force for the "Most Meritorious Flight"
- Mackays, now known as M&Co., a United Kingdom chainstore
- Mackay Pianos, see John Mackay (industrialist)

== See also ==
- Lake Mackay (disambiguation)
- MacKaye
- Mackey (disambiguation)
- Mackeys (disambiguation)
- McKay (disambiguation)
- McKey (disambiguation)
- Floortje Mackaij (born 1995), Dutch racing cyclist
- Roy Makaay (born 1975), Dutch football coach and former player
- All pages beginning with Mackay
- All pages beginning with Mckay
