= John MacKay =

John MacKay, Mackay, or McKay may refer to:

== Arts and entertainment ==
- John Mackay (poet) (1656–1754), Scottish Gaelic poet known as Am Pìobaire Dall
- John Henry Mackay (1864–1933), Scottish writer, anarchist, thinker and homosexual activist
- John Victor Mackay (1891–1945), American art director
- John D. Mackay (1909–1970), Orcadian schoolteacher
- John P. McKay (died 2022), American historian and professor, author of A History of Western Society
- John McKay (pianist) (born 1938), Canadian-American pianist
- John McKay (guitarist) (born 1958), British guitarist and former member of Siouxsie & the Banshees
- John McKay (director) (born 1965), British film and television director

== Business ==
- John Mackay (industrialist, born 1774) (1774–1841), ship master and industrialist in Boston, Massachusetts
- John William Mackay (1831–1902), Irish-born American industrialist
- John Calder Mackay (1920–2014), American real estate developer

== Military and public service ==
- John Frederick MacKay (1873–1930), Scottish recipient of the Victoria Cross
- Sir John McKay (police officer) (1912–2004), British police officer
- John B. McKay (1922–1975), U.S. Navy officer and test pilot
- John McKay (attorney) (born 1956), United States Attorney for the Western District of the state of Washington

== Politics ==
- John McKay (Ontario politician, born 1841) (1841–1918), Ontario physician and political figure
- John McKay (English politician) (1883–1964), British Labour Party MP for Wallsend, 1945–1964
- John Keiller MacKay (1888–1970), 19th Lieutenant Governor of Ontario, Canada, 1957–1963
- John George MacKay (1893–1974), farmer and political figure on Prince Edward Island
- William John MacKay (fl. 1929–1934), Ontario politician
- John P. MacKay (fl. 1937–1943), Ontario politician
- John MacKay, Baron MacKay of Ardbrecknish (1938–2001), Scottish Conservative Member of Parliament for Argyll, 1979–1987
- John McKay (Northern Ireland politician) (born 1945), member of the Northern Ireland Constitutional Convention
- John McKay (New Brunswick politician) (born 1948), former Speaker of the Legislative Assembly of New Brunswick and mayor of Miramichi, New Brunswick
- John McKay (Ontario politician, born 1948) (born 1948), member of the Canadian parliament
- John M. McKay (born 1948), American politician from Florida

== Science ==
- John Bain Mackay (1795–1888), nurseryman based in Clapton, London
- John Sturgeon Mackay (1843–1914), Scottish mathematician
- John Yule Mackay (1860–1930), Scottish anatomist and principal of University College, Dundee
- John Ross Mackay (1915–2014), Canadian geographer
- John McKay (mathematician) (1939–2022), British-Canadian mathematician

== Sports ==
- John Sutherland Mackay (1848–1924), Scottish medical doctor and president of Rio Tinto FC
- John McKay (1850–1916), co-founder of the Gaelic Athletic Association
- John McKay (footballer, born 1898) (1898–?), Scottish footballer
- John McKay (American football) (1923–2001), American football coach
- John McKay (1950s footballer), Scottish footballer
- John Mackay (cricketer) (born 1937), Australian cricketer
- J. K. McKay (John Kenneth McKay, born 1953), American football wide receiver
- John Mackay (rugby league) (born 1956), Australian rugby league player

== Others ==
- John Mackay, 11th of Strathnaver (died 1529), Scottish chief of Clan Mackay
- John Mackay (Australian pioneer) (1839–1914), founder of the city of Mackay, Australia
- John A. Mackay (1889–1983), Scottish missionary and founder of the Anglo-Peruvian School in Lima, Peru
- John Calvin MacKay (1891–1986), Free Church of Scotland minister
- John MacKay (journalist) (born 1966), Scottish television journalist and newscaster

== See also ==
- Jack McKay (disambiguation)
- John Mackey (disambiguation)
- John Mackie (disambiguation)
