= Don McKay =

Don McKay may refer to:

- Don McKay (poet) (born 1942), Canadian poet, editor, and educator
- Don McKay (actor) (1925–2018), American actor, dancer and singer
- Don McKay (rugby union) (1937–2024), New Zealand rugby union player
- Sir Don McKay (politician) (1908–1988), New Zealand politician
- Don McKay (film) a 2009 independent drama thriller film

== See also ==
- Donald McKay (disambiguation)
