= John Mackie (physician) =

Scottish physician

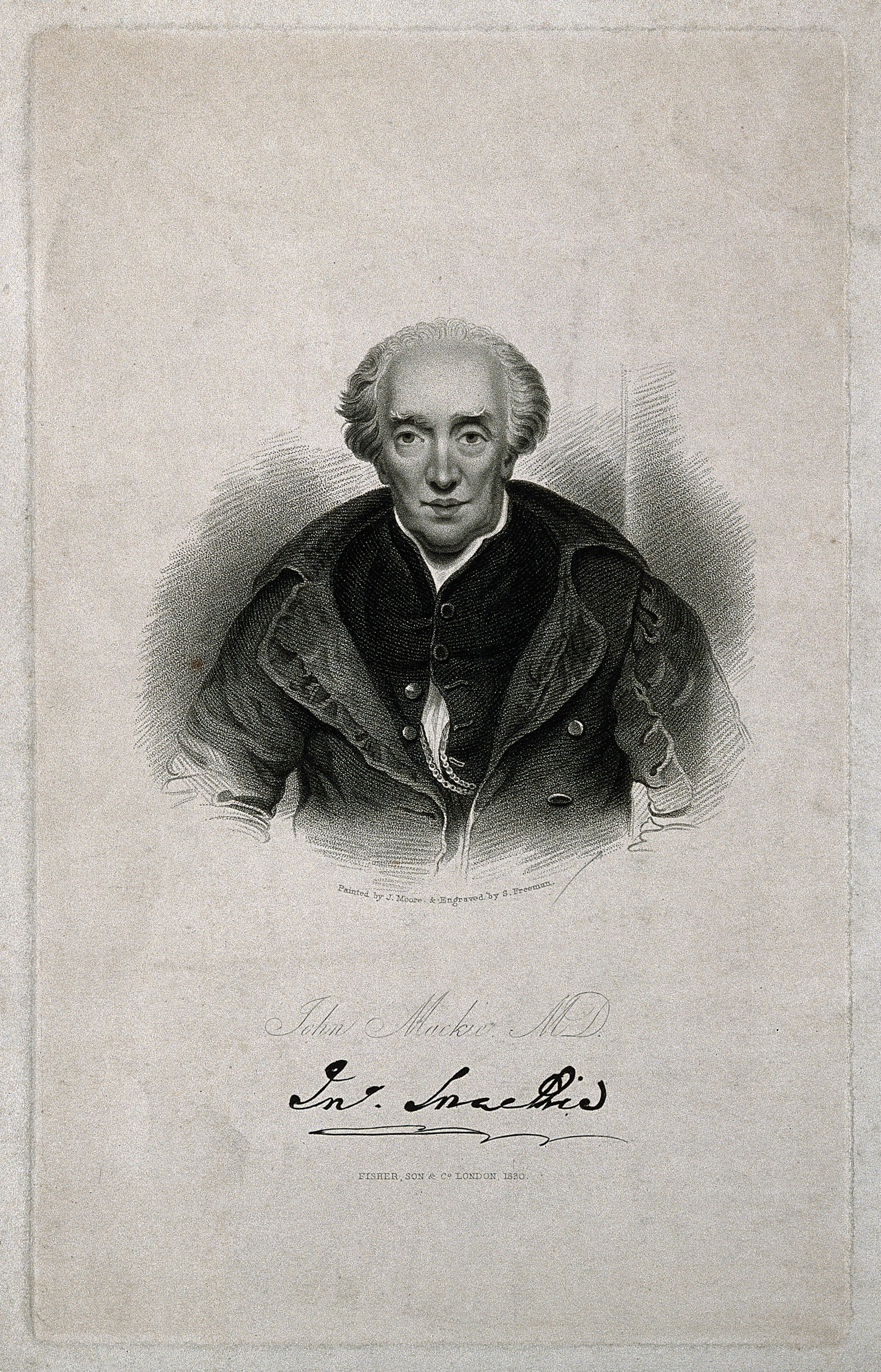
- 1830 engraving of Mackie
- Born: 1748; Fifeshire, Scotland
- Died: 29 January 1831 (aged 82–83)
- Occupation: Physician

John Mackie (1748 – 29 January 1831) was a Scottish physician.

== Biography ==
Mackie was the eldest of a family of fifteen children, was born in 1748 at Dunfermline Abbey in Fifeshire. In 1763 he commenced his medical studies at Edinburgh and on leaving the university he settled at Huntingdon. About 1792 he removed to Southampton, and there practised with great success till 1814, when he left for a ten years' tour on the continent, where he only practised his profession occasionally, but numbered among his patients the queen of Spain, the ex-king of Holland, and other persons of rank. In 1819 he printed anonymously at Vevay for private distribution a 'Sketch of a New Theory of Man,' which was translated into French, and reprinted in English at Bath, 1822. On his return to England, after passing several winters at Bath, he removed to Chichester, where he died 29 January 1831 at the age of eighty-three. He married in 1784 the daughter of a French clergyman, who translated into English the 'Letters of Madame de Sévigné,' published in London, 12 mo, 8 vols. 1802. She died at Vevay in 1819, leaving one son and one daughter. Mackie was a religious man and an attached member of the church of England, notwithstanding his Scottish parentage and education. He was most liberal to his patients, and at Southampton showed great kindness to numerous French emigrants. He was fond of reading, and was very popular in society. Miss L. M. Hawkins, in her 'Memoirs, Anecdotes,' &c. (i. 310), calls him a most agreeable conversationist. A fine portrait of him was painted in miniature by George Engleheart in 1784 (the date of his marriage); another by Marchmont Moore in 1830 was engraved by Samuel Freeman in the same year, and a drawing in water-colours was executed by Slater in 1808.
