= Arthur McKee =

Arthur McKee (14 August 1863 – 9 March 1943) was a New Zealand newspaper proprietor, photo-engraver and printer, land agent, businessman, orchardist. He was born in Liverpool, Lancashire, England on 14 August 1863. He was one of the directors behind the company that published The Cyclopedia of New Zealand.
