= Nicholas McKay =

Nicholas McKay is the name of:

- Nicholas McKay (actor), Australian actor on the television series Farscape
- Nicholas McKay (inventor) (1920–2014), American inventor and entrepreneur
