= Robert Mackay =

Robert Mackay or Mckay, with spelling variations of the given name as Bobby, Rob, or Bob, may refer to:

== Sports ==
- Robert McKay (American football) (1887–1958), American football player and investment banker
- Bob McKay (1947–2026), American football player in the NFL
- Bobby McKay (1900–1977), Scottish football player and manager

== Others ==
- Robert Mackay (businessman) (1840–1916), Canadian businessman and politician from Quebec
- Robert Mackay (priest), Dean of Aberdeen and Orkney from 1922 to 1934
- Robert Hugh MacKay (1868–1941), Canadian businessman and politician from Nova Scotia
- Robert William Mackay (1803–1882), British philosophical and religious author
- Robert McKay (lawyer) (1919–1990), dean of New York University Law School
- Robert Sinclair MacKay (born 1956), British mathematician
- Rob McKay, New Zealand paleoceanographer
- Robert M. L. McKay, Canadian microbiologist
- Robert Alexander MacKay (1894–1979), Canadian political scientist and diplomat

== See also ==
- Bob McCay (1896–1962), American cartoonist
