= George Mackay (rugby union) =

Australian rugby union player (1906–1981)

- Born: George Arthur Mackay; 7 May 1906 Sydney
- Died: 7 May 1981 Canberra
- School: Newington College

Rugby union career
- Position: Fullback
International career
| Years | Team | Apps | (Points) |
| 1926 | Wallabies | 1 | (0) |

George Arthur Mackay (7 May 1906 – 7 May1981) was a rugby union player who represented Australia. He was born in Sydney, and attended Newington College (1919–1922). Mackay was a fullback and claimed one international rugby cap for Australia in 1926. In later years he lived in Canberra and he died in Royal Canberra Hospital on his 75th birthday.
