= Wade Clark Mackey =

American author and social scientist (born 1946)

W. C. Mackey (born 1946) is an American author and social scientist who has researched topics of anthropology, criminal justice, criminology, psychology, and sociology in his academic and professional career. He has authored Fathering Behaviors (Plenum, 1985) and The American Father (Plenum, 1996), and he co-authored the 2000 book Gender Roles, Traditions, and Generations to Come: The Collision of Competing Interests and the Feminist Paradox with Nancy S. Coney for Nova Science Publishing. He has written about the relationship between gender and parental interaction.

== Early life and family ==
Born in 1946 in New Jersey, Wade C. Mackey has developed close attachments to Virginia, Iowa and Texas in his career and private life. He married Bonnie Lee Watson of Norfolk, Virginia in 1969, and they had three children, Shannon, Jennifer and Michael. They divorced in 1995 while residing in Texas.

== Education ==
Dr. Mackey earned his B. A. in Anthropology and Sociology at the University of Virginia in 1967, his M.A. in psychology from Louisiana State University in 1970, and his Ph.D. in anthropology at the University of Virginia in 1976 (Vita – Wade C. Mackey, 2008).

== Career ==
One of Mackey's widely cited criminal justice articles is "Police Violence as a Function of Community Characteristics," (with Dr. Richard R. E. Kania) which appeared in Criminology in 1977. He revisited the topic in 2009 with Dr. Vance McLaughlin in an article in Criminal Justice Studies, “Police-Caused Homicides in the U.S. as a Function of Community Characteristics: Revisiting a Set of Relationships from a Previous Generation.” In both studies he and his colleagues demonstrated strong correlations between police decision-making in deadly-force situations and features of the communities the police served.

His article, “Violent Crime and the Loss of Fathers: Beyond the Long Arm,” was included in a collection prepared by anthropologist Myrdene Anderson, The Cultural Shaping of Violence, Purdue University Press, 2004.

He has been a frequent contributor to Mankind Quarterly, often co-authoring articles with psychiatrist Dr. Ronald S. Immerman. Together they have explored some of the psychological aspects of human social evolution and cultural development.

The common thread to his work has been the proposition that the role of the father in child development is far more important than is usually supposed or credited in contemporary family studies (Mackey and Mackey 2003). Showing empirically that growing up fatherless often has negative social consequences for children, he has challenged the social desirability of social policies which sustain and even reward single-parent family arrangements. This has set him at odds with some feminist scholars and his work has been deemed “politically incorrect” in their circles (Kania and Mackey 1983; Mackey and Coney, 2000).

Mackey taught for the Department of Criminal Justice at Jacksonville State University of Alabama between 2007 and 2009 before retiring. Since his retirement he has lived in Wilton, Iowa.

Mackey also taught for Cy-Fair College in Cypress, Texas; North Harris College in Houston, Texas; Tomball College in Tomball, Texas; the University of Arkansas at Monticello, Arkansas; Southeastern Community College in West Burlington, Iowa; El Paso Community College and the Army's Sergeant-Major's Academy in El Paso, Texas; Iowa Wesleyan College in Mt. Pleasant, Iowa; Tarkio College in Tarkio, Missouri; South Dakota State University in Brookings, South Dakota; Virginia Commonwealth University, Richmond Virginia; School of Continuing Education of the University of Virginia and the Piedmont Community College in Charlottesville, Virginia; the Louisiana State University at Eunice, La.; and Louisiana State University in Baton Rouge, Louisiana (Vita – Wade C. Mackey, 2008).

He has been the recipient of three Harry Frank Guggenheim Foundation research grants, in 1977, 1980 and 1989, and was the 1985 Chadwick Distinguished Teacher of the Year at Iowa Wesleyan College. In 1974 he received a National Science Foundation research grant to study adult-child behaviour in public places. He has done extensive field research in Iceland in 1977, Ireland in 1980, Mexico in 1975 and Spain in 1974, and directed field research projects on adult-child interaction in Austria (1986), Kenya (1986), France, (1986), Great Britain (1986), Brazil (1977, 1981), Taiwan (1980), Israel (1980), Japan (1977), Hong Kong (1979), Morocco (1977), India (1978), Peru (1976), Sri Lanka (1982), and Ivory Coast (1977, 1981) (Vita – Wade C. Mackey, 2008).

== Bibliography ==
- Kania, Richard R. E., and Mackey, Wade C. (1977) "Police Violence as a Function of Community Characteristics," Criminology, Volume 15, #1.
- Kania, Richard R. E., and Wade C. Mackey (1983) "A Preliminary Analysis of Feminist Views on the Crime of Rape," Southern Journal of Criminal Justice, Volume 8, #1.
- Mackey, Bonnie W.; Mackey, Wade C. (Summer 2009). "The Presence of the U.S. Father as an Enhancement for His Children's Reading Achievement: Masculine Influence or a Second Parent?". Reading Improvement. 46 (2).
- Mackey, Wade C. (2008) Vita – Wade C. Mackey. Document on file in the Department of Criminal Justice at Jacksonville State University of Alabama.
- Mackey, Wade C. (1996) The American Father, Plenum.
- Mackey, Wade C. (1985) Fathering Behaviors, Plenum.
- Mackey, Wade C. (2004) “Violent Crime and the Loss of Fathers: Beyond the Long Arm,” in The Cultural Shaping of Violence, Purdue University Press, edited by Myrdene Anderson.
- Mackey, Wade C., and Nancy S. Coney (2000) Gender Roles, Traditions and Generations to Come: The Collision of Competing Interests and the Feminist Paradox, Nova Science Publishing.
- Mackey, Wade C., and Mackey, Bonnie W. (2003) “The Presence of Fathers in Attenuating Young Male Violence: Dad as Social Palliative,” Marriage & Family Review 35: 63–75.
