= Charlie MacKay =

Australian rules footballer and medical specialist

Personal information
- Full name: Charles Vincent MacKay
- Born: 3 May 1880; Woods Point, Victoria
- Died: 26 April 1953 (aged 72); South Yarra, Victoria
- Original team: Trinity College

Playing career^{1}
Years	Club	Games (Goals)
1905–06	Melbourne	12 (7)
- ^{1} Playing statistics correct to the end of 1911.

Charles Vincent MacKay (3 May 1880 – 26 April 1953) was a noted Australian medical specialist and an Australian rules footballer who played for Melbourne in the Victorian Football League (VFL).

== Family ==
The son of Donald MacKay (1849–1934), and Eleanor (a.k.a. "Helen") MacKay (1855–1930), née Vincent, Charles Vincent MacKay was born at Woods Point, Victoria on 3 May 1880.

He married Rose Nita née Collins, née Mackay (1890–1973) in Marylebone, London, England in 1927.

== Football ==
Charles MacKay played VFL football while studying medicine at Trinity College.

== Medicine ==
He graduated in medicine from the University of Melbourne at the end of 1905.

Following his graduation, MacKay worked in several Melbourne hospitals, completing a Doctorate of Medicine by Thesis in 1910, and taking on the role of medical superintendent of the Melbourne Hospital in 1911.

== Military service ==
At the outbreak of World War I, MacKay joined the Royal Army Medical Corps in England, where he was twice Mentioned in Despatches. Promoted to lieutenant-colonel, he took command of the No 80 General Hospital in Salonika during the latter stages of the war.

== Post-war Medicine ==
MacKay remained in England for several years following the war; and, after returning to Australia, he served as medical assistant to the director of the Australian Institute of Anatomy, Canberra, in 1936, and as acting director in 1937.

MacKay was appointed as director of the Anti-Cancer Council of Victoria in 1939.

During World War II, he was wartime executive medical officer of the Medical Equipment Control Committee, and after the war, he joined the Cancer Institute as a secretary and later served as its executive medical officer.

== Death ==
He died at his residence on 26 April 1953.
