= Ben McKay =

Ben McKay may refer to:

- Ben McKay (politician) (1918–1976), member of the Tasmanian Legislative Council
- Ben McKay (footballer) (born 1997), Australian rules footballer

== See also ==
- Ben Mackey (born 1986), English footballer
- Benjamin Skene Mackay (1883–1930), Scottish politician and trade unionist
