= Alexander McKay =

Alexander McKay or MacKay may refer to:

- Alexander McKay (boxer) (1804–1830), Scottish heavyweight bare-knuckle fighter
- Alexander McKay (politician) (1843–1912), mayor of Hamilton, Ontario, 1886–1887
- Alexander Mackay (British Army officer) (1717–1789), British general and Member of Parliament
- Alexander MacKay (politician) (1818–?), merchant and politician in Nova Scotia, Canada
- Alexander Gordon McKay (1924–2007), Canadian academic who specialized in Vergilian studies
- Alexander Murdoch Mackay (1849–1890), Presbyterian missionary to Uganda
- Alexander MacKay (fur trader) (1770–1811), business associate of fur trader Duncan Cameron
- Alexander Grant MacKay (1860–1920), Canadian teacher, lawyer and provincial level politician
- Alexander Mackay (magistrate) (1833–1909), New Zealand farmer, explorer, linguist, magistrate and land court judge
- Alexander McLellan Mackay (1834–1905), businessman and politician in Newfoundland
- Alexander McKay (geologist) (1841–1917), New Zealand geologist
- Alexander McKay (educator) (1841–1917), educator in Nova Scotia
- Alex MacKay (umpire), American baseball umpire
