= Craig Fowler =

British TV Presenter

- Born: Craig Fowler; Scotland
- Years active: 2007–present
- Presenting career
- Show: A View from the Terrace (2019–present)
- Station: BBC Scotland

Craig Fowler is a Scottish television presenter and podcaster. He is a panelist on Scottish football magazine and factual television television series A View from the Terrace.

== Career ==
Fowler co-founded Scottish football podcast The Terrace in 2007 alongside Alan Temple, Jen McLean and Niall McNeill, while studying journalism at Napier University in 2007. The podcast covers the latest goings on in the SPFL.

Fowler worked as a sports reporter for The Scotsman from 2016 until 2023.

In 2019, an adaptation of the podcast was made into a television show, A View from the Terrace, and launched in the opening week of the new BBC Scotland channel.
