= George Mackay (cricketer) =

Australian cricketer (1860–1948)

Personal information
- Born: 6 July 1860; Castlemaine, Victoria, Australia
- Died: 22 May 1948 (aged 87); Bendigo, Australia

Domestic team information
- Years: Team
- 1880-1884: Victoria
- Source: Cricinfo, 21 July 2015

George Mackay (6 July 1860 – 22 May 1948) was an Australian cricketer. He played six first-class cricket matches for Victoria between 1880 and 1884.

== See also ==
- List of Victoria first-class cricketers
