= Craig McKay (cartoonist) =

American cartoonist

Craig McKay (born 1966) is an American cartoonist who has done freelance cartooning and illustration for numerous of firms.

== Biography ==
McKay was born in Ohio in 1966 but was raised in Indiana. He attended the Art Academy of Cincinnati in Cincinnati, Ohio, graduating with a B.F.A. in 1989. Working as a freelancer since 1990, McKay received the National Cartoonist Society Advertising and Illustration Award in 1999, 2000, and 2008. He and his wife live in Cincinnati.

== Awards ==
- National Cartoonist Society Division Award for Advertising and Illustration
  - 1999 – for his illustration of A Christmas Carol for the Cincinnati Playhouse in the Park
  - 2000 – for his packaging illustrations and character designs for "X-treme Petz," a line of toys
  - 2008
