= McKey (surname) =

McKey is a surname. Notable people with the name include:

- David McKey (born 1954), basketball coach
- Denis McKey (1910–1982), Australian rules footballer
- Derrick McKey (born 1966), American basketball player
- Lynsey McKey (born 1990), Irish football player
- Willy Mckey (1980–2021), Venezuelan poet and writer
- Alys McKey Bryant (1880–1954), American aviator
- Alice Jane McKey (1829–1866), mother of Doc Holliday (who sometimes used 'McKey' as an alias)

== See also ==
- McKee
