= Donald Mackay-Coghill =

South African cricketer (born 1941)

Personal information
- Born: 4 November 1941
- Died: 9 May 2025 (aged 83)
- Source: Cricinfo, 18 July 2020

Donald Mackay-Coghill (4 November 1941 – 9 May 2025) was a South African cricketer. He played in 73 first-class matches between 1962 and 1974.

Mackay-Coghill died in Australia in May 2025.
