= George R. McKay =

American politician

Member of the Michigan House of Representatives from the Calhoun County 2nd district
- In office January 1, 1865 – December 31, 1866
- Preceded by: Abner Pratt
- Succeeded by: Harvey Randall

Personal details
- Born: c. 1817 Caledonia, New York
- Died: March 21, 1890 (aged 72–73) Marengo, Michigan
- Party: Republican (before 1872); Democratic (After 1872)

George R. McKay (c. 1817 – March 21, 1890) was a Michigan politician.

== Early life ==
McKay was born in about 1817 in Caledonia, New York. In 1852, McKay moved to Marengo, Michigan, where bought a farm to live on.

== Career ==
On November 8, 1864, McKay was elected to the Michigan House of Representatives where he represented the Calhoun County 2nd district from January 4, 1865 to December 31, 1866. McKay was an influential member of the Grange. McKay was a Republican until 1872, when he became a Democrat.

== Personal life ==
McKay was widowed upon his wife's death in 1879.

== Later life and death ==
At some point, McKay moved to Chicago and Kansas. He moved back to Marengo, Michigan in 1888. McKay died in Marengo on March 21, 1890.
