= Samuel McKee =

Samuel McKee may refer to:

- Samuel McKee (politician, born 1774) (1774–1826), U.S. Representative from Kentucky
- Samuel McKee (born 1832) (1832–1862), Union Army colonel from Kentucky
- Samuel McKee (politician, born 1833) (1833–1898), Union Army captain and U.S. Representative from Kentucky
- Samuel B. McKee (1822–1887), American attorney and judge
