= John Mackey =

John Mackey may refer to:

- John Mackey (American football) (1941–2011), American football tight end
- John Mackey (businessman) (born 1953), founder of Whole Foods Market
- John Mackey (composer) (born 1973), American composer of classical concert music
- John Mackey (hurler) (1914–1989), Irish athlete in the sport of hurling
- John Mackey (politician) (1863–1924), Australian politician
- John Mackey (Roman Catholic bishop) (1918–2014), Bishop of Auckland (1974-1983)
- John C. Mackey, American football coach
- Jack Mackey (John Bernard MacKey, 1922–1945), recipient of the Victoria Cross
- John Mackey (Tyler) (1882–1962), Irish hurler

== See also ==
- Jack McKay (disambiguation)
- John Mackay (disambiguation)
- John Mackie (disambiguation)
- John McKay (disambiguation)
