= Duncan McKay (TV presenter) =

British TV Presenter

- Born: Duncan McKay; Scotland
- Years active: 2019–present
- Career
- Show: A View from the Terrace (2019–present)
- Station: BBC Scotland
- Country: United Kingdom

Duncan McKay is a Scottish television presenter and podcaster. He is a regular contributor on Scottish football magazine and factual television television series A View from the Terrace.

== Career ==
He joined the cast of the long-running podcast 'The Terrace', which covers the latest goings on in the SPFL. In 2019, an adaptation of the podcast was made into a television show, A View from the Terrace, and launched in the opening week of the new BBC Scotland channel.

McKay features in a regular segment on A View from the Terrace called Put A Shift In. Throughout the run of the programme, he travels the length and breadth of the country trying out lots of different jobs at all levels of football. Some of the highlights include dressing up as Roary the Lion at Stark's Park, being a ballboy at Hampden Park, co-commentator and lead commentator for an Airdrieonians game and taking up the mantle of being assistant manager at Caledonian Braves F.C. for one game only.

In November 2024, the BBC reported that McKay would take over as first team manager of Albion Rovers in their upcoming league game against Hearts B as part of the TV show segment. Following outrage from supporters, the club announced on the day of the game that McKay had been relieved of his duties. The Rovers boss Sandy Clark later claimed that BBC Scotland had incorrectly reported the story and that McKay would not have picked the team or been in the dugout during the game.

== Personal life ==
McKay is a Hibs supporter.
