= George Mackay (surgeon) =

British surgeon (1861–1949)

- Born: 1861 near Madras, India
- Died: 10 May 1949 (aged 87–88); Edinburgh, United Kingdom
- Education: University of Edinburgh
- Known for: ophthalmic surgeon
- Spouse: Elise Marjory MacKay
- Children: Donald James MacKay; Alexander George MacKay; Kenneth Charles MacKay
- Father: George MacKay, a surgeon of the HEIC & of HM

George Mackay (1861-1949) was a British ophthalmic surgeon. He served in the Department of Ophthalmology of the University of Edinburgh and the Royal Infirmary of Edinburgh, and was a member of the Ophthalmological Society of the United Kingdom, the Scottish Ophthalmological Club and the French Ophthalmological Society.

== Early life and education ==
He was born near Madras, but the family moved back to Scotland when he was 4 years old. He was educated at Clifton and Inverness Colleges and graduated MB CM with honours from the University of Edinburgh in 188e and MD in 1888. He was awarded gold medal for his thesis, which was titled: A contribution to the study of hemianopsia of central origin: with special reference to acquired colour blindness and a clinical report of 4 cases. He specialised in ophthalmic surgery. During his post-graduate studies he spent some time in Vienna.

== Career ==
He became a Member of the Royal Colleges of Surgeons of England in 1883 and Fellow of the Royal Colleges of Surgeons of Edinburgh in 1886. After retiring from hospital practice he continued have an extensive private practice and became a Manager of the Royal Infirmary and President of the Royal College of Surgeons of Edinburgh (1919-1921). He was most famous for performing cataract operations, done with the utmost steadiness and precision. "We remember a distinguished figure, walking to and from the Infirmary irreproachably dressed, with a well-cut morning coat, shining tall hat, and immaculate linen." In 1912 he was elected a member of the Harveian Society of Edinburgh.

== Personal life ==
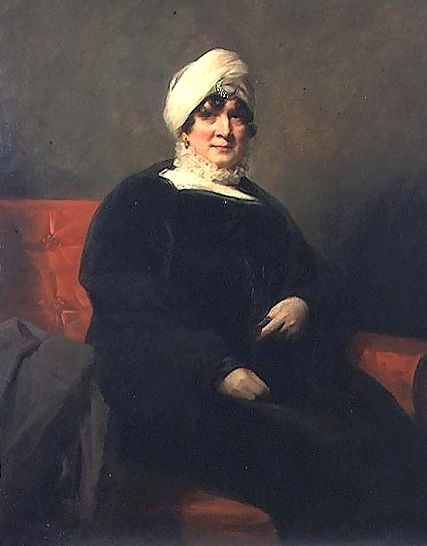
Louisa Campbell, George Mackay's great-grandmother

As a student he enjoyed athletics and gymnastics, and in later life took up golf and fishing. He was also a member of the Royal Company of Archers, the King's Bodyguard for Scotland. Gaelic literature, archaeology, anthropology and geology were also his interests.

He is the son of Surgeon-General George Mackay, who served in the Indian Army, and was instrumental to the establishment of the Medical College of Madras.

His great-grandfather was Lt-Col. George Mackay, whose wife's portrait was painted by Henry Raeburn.
