= John McKee =

John McKee may refer to:

- John McKee (politician) (1771–1832), American politician
- John McKee (American football) (1877–1950), American football coach and physician
- John McKee (philanthropist) (1821–1902), African-American property magnate
- John McKee (rugby union coach), New Zealand rugby union coach
- John McKee (field hockey) (1996), Irish field hockey player
- John McKee (rugby union, born 2000), Irish rugby union player
