= Kevin McKee =

Kevin McKee may refer to:

- Kevin McKee (footballer) (born 1966), Scottish footballer
- Kevin McKee (sledge hockey) (born 1990), American sledge hockey player
- Kevin McKee, a victim of The Troubles, see Disappeared (Northern Ireland)
