= Thomas J. McKay =

American philosopher

Thomas McKay is an American philosopher currently professor of philosophy and director of graduate studies at the department of philosophy of Syracuse University. He was chairman of the department there from 1995 to 2002. He received his B.A. from Swarthmore College in 1969, his M.A. from University of Massachusetts Amherst in 1972, and his Ph.D., also from the University of Massachusetts, 1974, for a dissertation on "Essentialism and Quantified Modal Logic: Quine's Argument and Kripke's Semantics"

His work has primarily concerned the philosophy of logic and language. In 2006, Oxford University Press published his book, Plural Predicates a, in which he gives an account of a semantics for a plural logic. In particular he develops a Russellian account of plural definite descriptions.

He is also the author of the following textbooks:

- Modern Formal Logic (Macmillan, 1989; second edition, Thomson, 2006),
- Reasons, Explanations and Decisions (Wadsworth, 2000)

and the following journal articles:

- "Essentialism in Quantified Modal Logic," Journal of Philosophical Logic 4 (1975), 423–438.
- "Counterfactuals with Disjunctive Antecedents," with Peter van Inwagen, Philosophical Studies 31 (1977), 353–356.
- "The Principle of Predication," Journal of Philosophical Logic 7 (1978), 19–26.
- "Natural Kind Terms and Standards of Membership," with Cindy Stern, Linguistics and Philosophy 3 (1979), 27–34.
- "On Proper Names in Belief Ascriptions," Philosophical Studies 39 (1981), 287–303.
- "On Showing Invalidity," Canadian Journal of Philosophy 14 (1984), 97–100.
- "Critical Review of Michael Devitt's Designation, Noûs 18 (1984), 357–367.
- "Actions and De Re Beliefs," Canadian Journal of Philosophy 14 (1984), 631–635.
- "On Critical Thinking," American Philosophical Association Newsletter on Teaching Philosophy, Spring-Summer 1985, 19–20.
- "His Burning Pants," Notre Dame Journal of Formal Logic 27 (1986), 393–400.
- "Lowe and Baldwin on Modalities," Mind 95 (1986), 499–505.
- "he himself: Undiscovering an Anaphor," Linguistic Inquiry 22 (1991), 368–373.
- "Representing de re Beliefs," Linguistics and Philosophy 14 (1991), 711–739.
- "Analogy and Argument," Teaching Philosophy, 20 (1997), 49–60.
- "A reconsideration of an argument against compatibilism," Philosophical Topics, 24 (1996), 113–121. (Actually published in late 1997.)

He also wrote the encyclopedia chapters on "Modal Logic, Philosophical Issues," for the Routledge Encyclopedia of Philosophy, and "Propositional Attitude Reports," Stanford Encyclopedia of Philosophy, 2000, 2005. (2005 version co-authored with Michael Nelson), and many book chapters and other presentations.
