= McKees Creek =

River in the United States of America

McKees Creek is a stream in the U.S. state of Ohio. It is a tributary of Stony Creek.

McKees Creek was named for Col. McKee, an early agent to the Native Americans.

== Location ==
- Mouth: Confluence with Stony Creek in Logan County 40°18′57″N 83°51′41″W
- Origin: Logan County east of Bellefontaine 40°21′47″N 83°43′03″W

== See also ==
- List of rivers of Ohio
