= John Milton Mackie =

American author

John Milton Mackie (19 December 1813, in Wareham, Massachusetts – 27 July 1894, in Great Barrington, Massachusetts) was an American writer who specialized in topics from German history and literature.

== Biography ==
He graduated from Brown University in 1832, and studied at the University of Berlin, Germany, 1833–1834. On his return to the United States, he was tutor at Brown 1835–1838. He contributed articles on German topics to the North American Review, American Whig Review, and Christian.

== Books ==
- Life of Godfrey William von Leibnitz, with Gottschalk Eduard Guhrauer (Boston, 1845) at archive.org
- Life of Samuel Gorton in Sparks's “American Biography” series (1848)
- Cosas de España, or Going to Madrid via Barcelona (New York, 1848)
- Life of Schamyl, the Circassian Chief (1856)
- Life of Tai-Ping-Wang, Chief of the Chinese Insurrection (1857)
- From Cape Cod to Dixie and the Tropics (1864)
