= Donald Mackay (fur trader) =

Donald Mackay (c. 1753 – 26 June 1833) was born in Scotland and served in the British army during the early part of the American revolution. After he left the army, he decided to stay in Canada and pursue a career.

Mackay started in the fur trade out of Montreal in 1779 as a clerk with an independent trader. When the North West Company was formed at Grand Portage, he became a clerk with that organization. He had a varied and grueling start in the business and he and his partner ended up in 1780 trading on the Assiniboine River, near Fort La Reine. That year he led an expedition to the upper Missouri River and the Hidatsa villages.
