= Paul McKee =

Paul McKee may refer to:

- Paul McKee (developer), St. Louis, Missouri-area property developer
- Paul McKee (athlete) (born 1977), Irish sprint athlete
- Paul McKee (author) (1898–1974), scholar and author of children's books
- Paul McKee (American football) (1923–1999), American football end
