= Michael McKay =

Mike or Michael McKay may refer to:

- Michael McKay (cyclist) (born 1964), Jamaican cyclist who represented Jamaica at the 1992 Summer Olympics
- Michael McKay (labor leader), American labor leader and racketeer
- Michael McKay (astronaut), former member of the Canadian Astronaut Corps
- Mike McKay (basketball) (born 1965), Australian basketball player
- Mike McKay (ice hockey) (born 1976), Canadian ice hockey player
- Mike McKay (rower) (born 1964), Australian rower and Olympic medalist
- Mike McKay (politician) (born 1969), member of the Maryland House of Delegates

== See also ==
- Michael Mackay (born 1982), footballer
- Michal Mckay (1942–2024), New Zealand fashion journalist
- Mickey MacKay (1894–1940), Canadian ice hockey player
