= John Mackay (cricketer) =

Australian cricketer

Personal information
- Born: 24 November 1937 (age 88); Rockhampton, Queensland, Australia
- Source: Cricinfo, 5 October 2020

John Mackay (born 24 November 1937) is an Australian cricketer. He played in 47 first-class matches for Queensland between 1959 and 1967.

== See also ==
- List of Queensland first-class cricketers
