= George McKay (rugby union) =

- Born: George R. McKay

Rugby union career
- Position: number eight
International career
Years	Team	Apps	(Points)
1920–22	Wallabies	6	(9)

George R. McKay was a rugby union player who represented Australia.

McKay, a number eight, claimed a total of 6 international rugby caps for Australia.
