= Donald MacKay (architect) =

Scottish-American architect (c. 1846 – c. 1887)

- Born: c. 1846; Scotland, United Kingdom
- Died: c. 1887
- Occupations: Contractor, architect
- Years active: 1881–1887
- Style: Gothic Revival; Second Empire style
- Spouse: Margaret (m. 1879)
- Children: 2

Donald MacKay (c. 1846 – c. 1887) was a Scottish-American contractor and architect active in the Pacific Northwest. Born in Scotland, he was active in architectural design from 1881 until his death around 1887. MacKay designed a variety of religious, civil, and private constructions across the Washington Territory and British Columbia. After designing the Saint Patrick's Catholic Church in Walla Walla, Washington, in 1881, he moved to Seattle where he oversaw a large number of designs in the Gothic Revival and Second Empire styles over the following years. After entering a commercial dispute with Seattle Catholic parish leader Francis X. Prefontaine, he relocated to Tacoma, Washington, where he saw little business. In 1887, he moved to Vancouver, Canada, in an attempt to take advantage of reconstruction efforts in the aftermath of the Great Vancouver Fire; however, he only designed one known building in the city, and died soon after. His only extant designs are the Saint Patrick's Church in Walla Walla (with some subsequent modifications) and the Proto-Cathedral of St. James the Greater in Vancouver, Washington.

== Biography ==
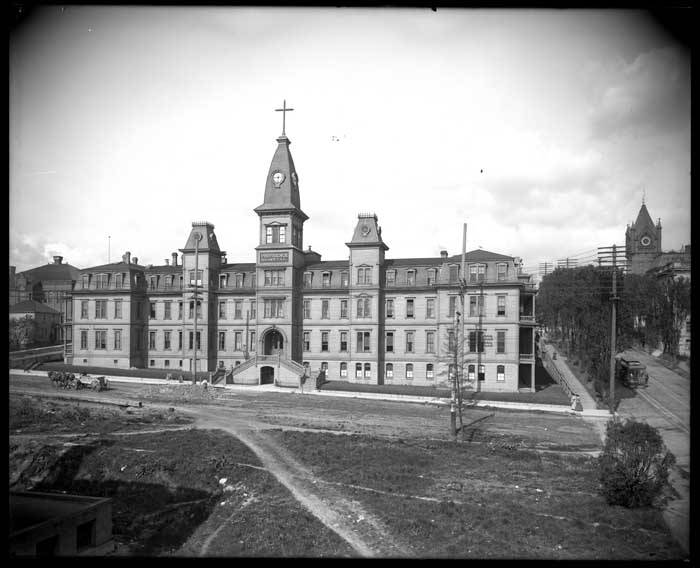
MacKay's Providence Hospital building, c. 1904

Donald MacKay was born in Scotland around 1846, moving to the United States at some point over the following decades. In 1879, he married an English woman named Margaret who was around 17 years old. They were recorded by the 1880 United States census as living in Walla Walla, Washington Territory. Initially working as a contractor from June 1880, MacKay began working as an architect while in Walla Walla: he was contracted to design Saint Patrick's Roman Catholic Church in the city. The church had previously occupied a series of three other buildings as the town grew; planning began for a fourth, larger church building by 1870, only five years after the previous structure had been completed. A brick structure in the Gothic style, MacKay's church was dedicated on December 25, 1881. The building's transepts and chancel were later enlarged, but MacKay's bell tower, nave, and entrance facade remain largely original.

He briefly visited Portland, Oregon, where he may have encountered the work of Portland architects Warren Heywood Williams and Joseph Sheridan; his later work suggests familiarity with their designs. He traveled to Seattle, arriving on April 18, 1882, to pursue architectural contracts with the city's Catholic parish. From 1882 to 1883, he designed the Providence Hospital, possibly with plans laid out by Mother Joseph, and an enlargement of the Roman Catholic Church of Our Lady of Good Help. Over the following years, he designed a number of civil and religious structures in Seattle, often with inspirations from the Second Empire style. He designed the Occidental Hotel, the city's primary hotel during the 1880s; during this period, he lived in the hotel. Additionally, he designed the Seattle Engine House No. 1, a fire station later destroyed in the Great Seattle Fire.

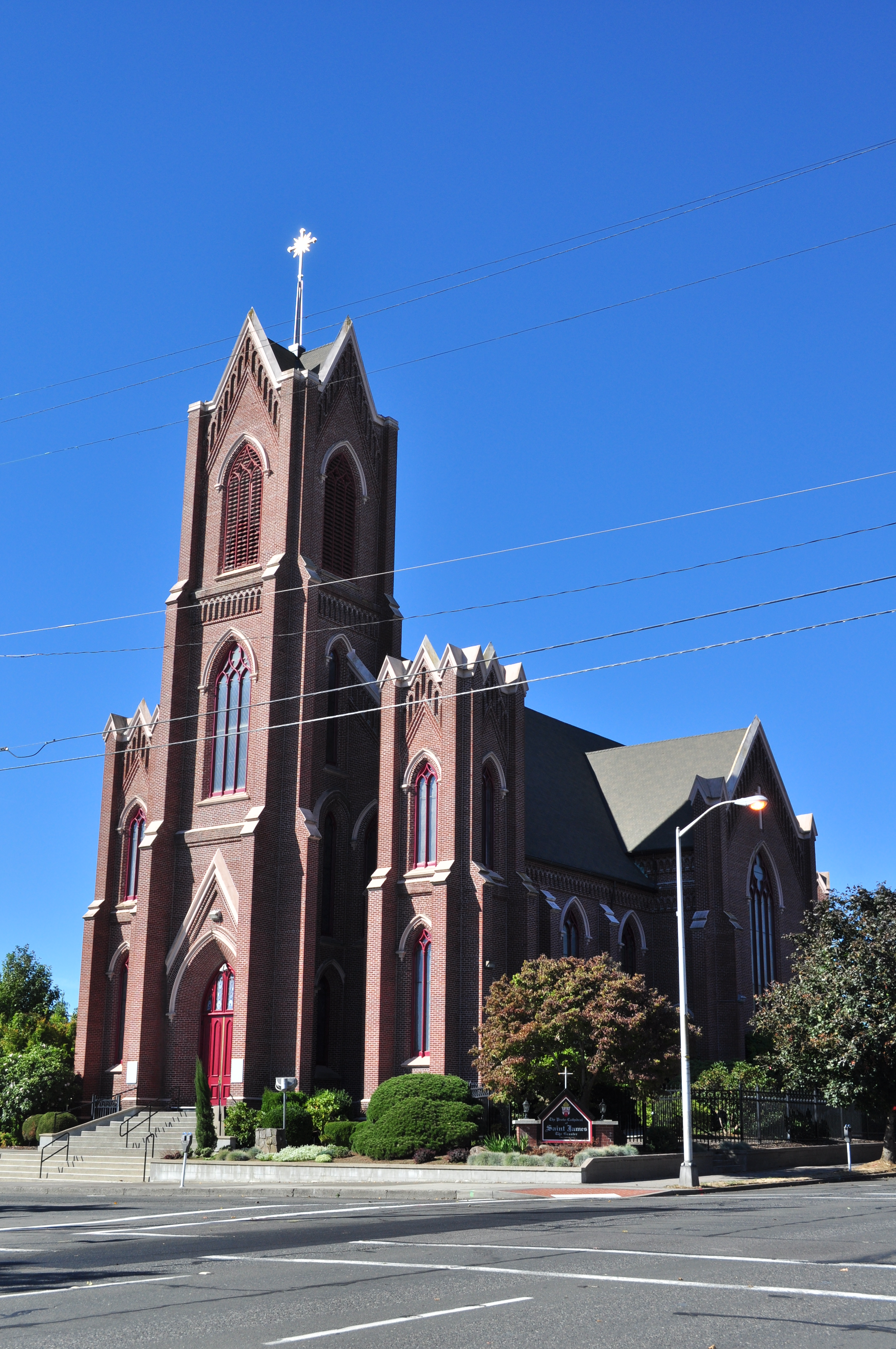
The Proto-Cathedral of St. James the Greater in Vancouver, Washington, one of MacKay's two surviving works

In addition to his work in Seattle, MacKay designed two major projects in Vancouver, Washington, from 1883 to 1885; the First Presbyterian Church and the Saint James Roman Catholic Cathedral. He was contracted to design what would become Gonzaga University of Spokane, Washington, but MacKay's designs for the university went ultimately unused. From 1883 to 1884, he designed the Academy of the Holy Names in Seattle with an eclectic mix of Italianate, Second Empire, and Gothic components. He fought with parish leader Francis X. Prefontaine over the direction of construction work, writing that Prefontaine was attempting to take over responsibility over directing construction work and take him "down to the starvation terms offered [...] for my work". Angered by this dispute, MacKay relocated his business to Tacoma, where he had already begun some architectural work. None of his contracts in Tacoma ultimately came to fruition, beyond a now-demolished Stick style residence for businessman Edward Slade "Skookum" Smith constructed from 1884 to 1886.

MacKay left Tacoma in 1884, likely moving to Portland. In 1887, he relocated to Vancouver, British Columbia, due to the widespread reconstruction efforts in the aftermath of the 1886 Great Vancouver Fire. Although he opened an office in the city, MacKay may have been unable to find significant contracts; his only known design in the city was a private residence featuring a rooftop observatory. MacKay died around this time, although it is unknown when and where; his widow, alongside his daughters Christine and Elizabeth, returned to Portland by 1888. A biographer, David Rash, described MacKay's career as "unsurpassed at its time", writing that "no other resident architect in Seattle at the time could have given these buildings the same design sophistication."

== Works ==
Buildings designed by Donald MacKay
| Name | Location | Date constructed | Style | Status |
|---|---|---|---|---|
| Saint Patrick's Roman Catholic Church | Walla Walla, Washington | 1881–1882 | Gothic Revival | Extant, modified |
| Roman Catholic Church of Our Lady of Good Help | Seattle, Washington | 1882 | Gothic Revival | Demolished |
| Providence Hospital | Seattle, Washington | 1882–1883 | Second Empire | Demolished |
| Occidental Hotel | Seattle, Washington | 1882–1884 | Second Empire | Demolished |
| Seattle Engine House No. 1 | Seattle, Washington | 1883–1884 | — | Demolished |
| Academy of the Holy Names | Seattle, Washington | 1883–1884 | Italianate, Second Empire, Gothic revival | Demolished |
| Saint James Roman Catholic Cathedral | Vancouver, Washington | 1883–1885 | Gothic Revival | Extant |
| First Presbyterian Church | Vancouver, Washington | 1883–1885 | — | Demolished |
| Edward S. Smith House | Tacoma, Washington | 1884–1886 | Stick style | Demolished |
| L. R. Johnson House | Vancouver, British Columbia | 1887 | — | Demolished |
