= Andrew McKee (disambiguation) =

Andrew McKee (1896–1976) was a submarine engineer.

Andrew or Andy McKee may also refer to:

- Andrew McKee (RAF officer) (1902–1988), British air marshall
- Andy McKee (born 1979), fingerstyle guitar player
- Andy McKee (bassist) (born 1953), American bass player
