= McKay (given name) =

McKay is a masculine given name. Notable people with the name include:

- McKay Christensen (born 1975), American baseball player
- McKay Coppins (born 1987), American journalist and author
- McKay McKinnon, American physician

== See also ==
- Mackay (disambiguation)
