= McKee Run =

McKee Run McKee Creek
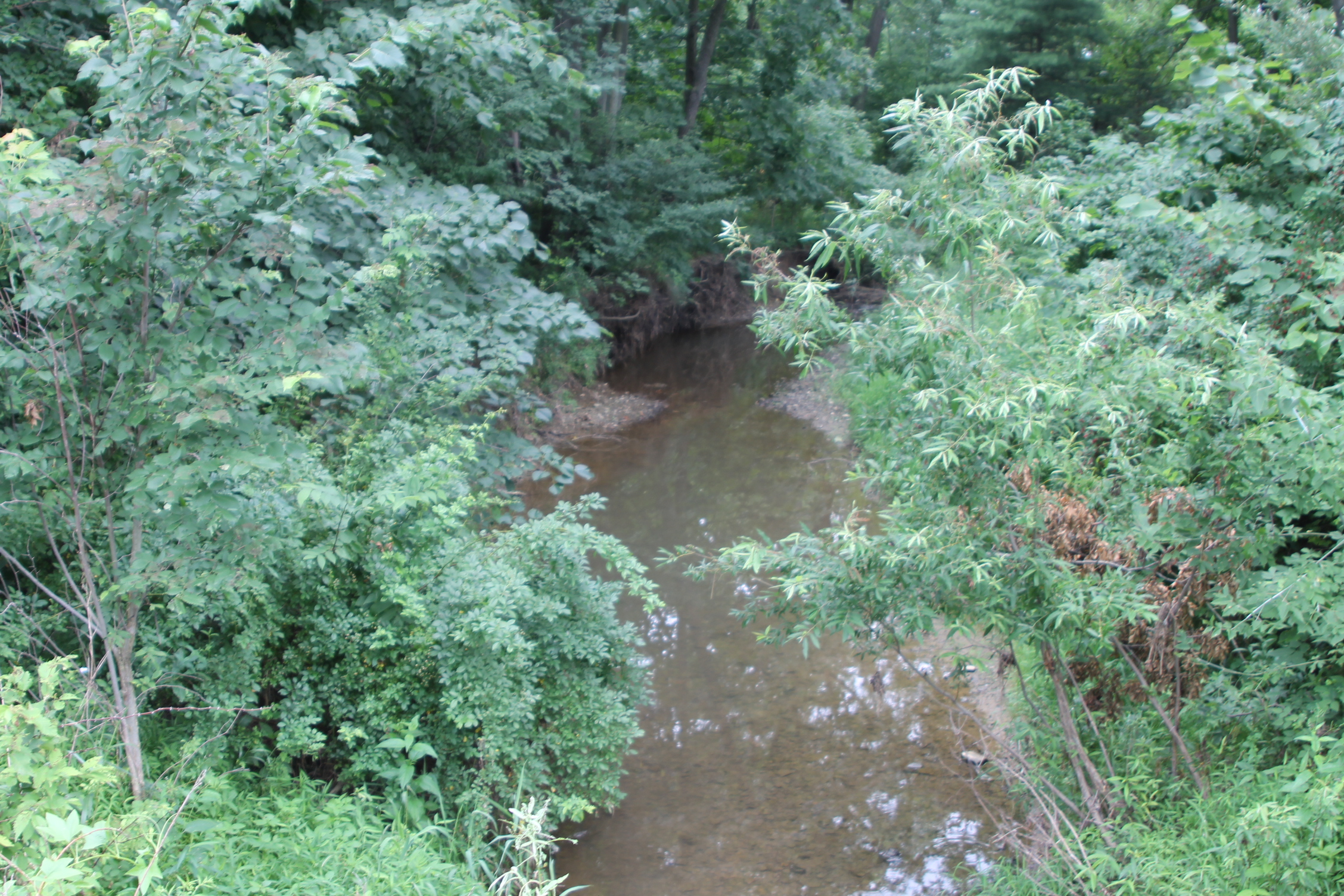
- McKee Run in the summertime

Physical characteristics
- Source
  - location: valley in Anthony Township, Montour County, Pennsylvania
  - elevation: between 940 and 960 feet (287 and 293 m)
- Mouth
  - location: County Line Branch in Anthony Township, Montour County, Pennsylvania
  - coordinates: 41°05′19″N 76°42′06″W
  - elevation: 525 ft (160 m)
- Length: 4.1 mi (6.6 km)
- Basin size: 2.68 mi^{2} (6.9 km^{2})

Basin features
- Progression: County Line Branch → West Branch Chillisquaque Creek → Chillisquaque Creek → West Branch Susquehanna River → Susquehanna River
- Tributaries
  - left: one unnamed tributary
  - right: one unnamed tributary

McKee Run (also known as McKee Creek) is a tributary of County Line Branch in Montour County, Pennsylvania, in the United States. It is approximately 4.1 miles (6.6 km) long and flows through Anthony Township. The watershed of the stream has an area of 2.68 square miles (6.9 km^{2}). The stream is designated as impaired by siltation and removal of vegetation due to agriculture. Land uses in the watershed include forested land, croplands, and pastures. A number of bridges cross the stream.

== Course ==
McKee Run begins in a valley in Anthony Township. It flows south for several tenths of a mile before turning south-southwest for a short distance and leaving the valley. The stream then turns south again for about a mile before turning southwest for several tenths of a mile. It then turns south for several tenths of a mile and crosses Pennsylvania Route 44 and receiving an unnamed tributary from the left before turning southwest. A few tenths of a mile further downstream, it receives an unnamed tributary from the right and turns south-southeast. After several tenths of a mile, the stream reaches its confluence with County Line Branch.

McKee Run joins County Line Branch 2.40 miles (3.86 km) upstream of its mouth.

=== Tributaries ===
McKee Run has no named tributaries. However, it does have two unnamed tributaries. These are known as UNT 18829 and UNT 18830.

== Hydrology ==
There are a total of 5.84 miles (9.40 km) of streams in the watershed of McKee Run. All of these are impaired by siltation and removal of vegetation due to agriculture. However, the stream has good water quality.

The HEC-1 peak 2-year discharge of McKee Run is 272 cubic feet per second (7.7 m^{3}/s). The 5-year peak discharge is 416 cubic feet per second (11.8 m^{3}/s), the 10-year peak discharge is 572 cubic feet per second (16.2 m^{3}/s), and the 25-year peak discharge is 851 cubic feet per second (24.1 m^{3}/s). The 50-year peak discharge of the stream is 1,115 cubic feet per second (31.6 m^{3}/s), the 100-year peak discharge is 1,418 cubic feet per second (40.2 m^{3}/s), and the 500-year peak discharge is 2,413 cubic feet per second (68.3 m^{3}/s).

== Geography and geology ==
The elevation near the mouth of McKee Run is 525 feet (160 m) above sea level. The elevation of the stream's source is between 940 and 960 feet (287 and 293 m) above sea level.

The width of the channel of McKee Run can be as high as 18 feet (5.5 m) or as low as 8 feet (2.4 m). The bank height is 3 feet (0.91 m) in some reaches. In this area, the stream slope is 0.063 feet per foot (6.3 cm/m). The roughness coefficient of the stream's channel at the Pennsylvania Route 44 bridge is 0.045.

The watershed of McKee Run contains rolling hills with croplands and pastures, as well as forested mountains. The stream does not experience streambank erosion near the Pennsylvania Route 44 bridge.

== Watershed ==
The watershed of McKee Run has an area of 2.68 square miles (6.9 km^{2}). A total of 1.30 square miles (3.4 km^{2}) drains into the stream upstream of the Pennsylvania Route 44 bridge. This part of the watershed is irregular in shape. The mouth of the stream is in the United States Geological Survey quadrangle of Washingtonville. However, its source is in the quadrangle of Hugesville. The watershed of the stream is in the northern part of Montour County.

The main land uses in the watershed of McKee Run above Pennsylvania Route 44 are forests, cropland, and pasture. A total of 6 percent of this part of the watershed is forested.

== History ==
McKee Run was entered into the Geographic Names Information System on August 2, 1979. Its identifier in the Geographic Names Information System is 1180740. The stream is also known as McKee Creek.

A concrete bridge carrying State Route 1006 was constructed across McKee Run in 1913. It is 40.0 feet (12.2 m) long and is located 3 miles (4.8 km) north of Washingtonville. A bridge carrying Pennsylvania Route 44 also crosses the stream.

In 1979, The State Water Plan proposed a hypothetical reservoir known as Small Potential Reservoir #020-3 on McKee Run 1,500 feet (460 m) upstream of Pennsylvania Route 44. Its dam was to have a height of 29 feet (8.8 m) and it was to drain an area of 1.3 square miles (3.4 km^{2}). The reservoir would have had a volume of 1,063 acre-feet (1.3 million cubic meters) if built.

== Biology ==
The vegetation along the streambanks of McKee Run consists of grasses in some reaches. Parts of the stream could benefit from additional riparian buffering.

== See also ==
- Beaver Run (County Line Branch), next tributary of County Line Branch going upstream
- List of rivers of Pennsylvania
