= Charles McKay =

American naturalist and explorer

- Born: Charles Leslie McKay; April 21, 1855; Appleton, Wisconsin
- Disappeared: April 19, 1883 (aged 27)
- Education: Butler University; Indiana University Bloomington; Cornell University
- Occupations: Naturalist, explorer

Charles Leslie McKay (April 21, 1855 – April 19, 1883) was an American naturalist and explorer.

McKay was born at Appleton, Wisconsin. He studied under David Starr Jordan at Appleton Collegiate Institute, Butler University and Indiana University, where he graduated as a Bachelor of Science. McKay attended Cornell University from 1875 to 1876 before transferring.

In 1881, McKay joined the U.S. Army Signal Corps. Spencer Fullerton Baird of the Smithsonian Institution was responsible for selecting Signal Officers for the remoter stations, and would choose men with scientific training who were prepared to study the local flora and fauna. Baird sent McKay to Nushagak, Alaska on the north side of Bristol Bay, Alaska. McKay collected a number of plants and animals and ethnographic artifacts for the Smithsonian, including a pair of a new species of bird which were named McKay's Bunting in his honor.

In April 1883, McKay disappeared when out on a collecting trip in a kayak. His body was never recovered.
