= Margaret MacKay (lawyer) =

New Zealand lawyer

Margaret Smith MacKay
- Born: 1903; Oamaru, Otago, New Zealand
- Died: 1998 (aged 94–95)
- Occupation: Lawyer

Margaret Smith MacKay (1903–1998) was a New Zealand lawyer. She was the tenth woman in New Zealand to be admitted to the bar.

== Biography ==
MacKay was born in Oamaru, in New Zealand's South Island, in 1903. Her father, Adam MacKay, had emigrated to Oamaru from Kilmarnock, Scotland, with his widowed mother and brother. He established a grocery business in the town.

MacKay initially worked as a junior typist in her uncle's Oamaru law firm, Grave & Grave. She studied law by correspondence through the University of Otago. She was admitted to the bar in 1929, becoming the tenth woman in New Zealand and the second woman in Otago to be admitted to the bar. MacKay was promoted to the position of managing clerk, and in 1946, she became a partner in Lee, Grave & Zimmerman, but opposition from one partner meant that her name was not added to the partnership list until his retirement in 1961.

In 1948, MacKay's uncle, A.J. Grave, died and left his private golf course at Waianakarua to MacKay. She maintained and played on the course until her death. MacKay was also actively involved with Presbyterian Support Services and the establishment of Iona Home and Hospital. A wing of the house is named after her.

The Otago Women Lawyers Society awarded MacKay life membership in recognition of her pioneering career in law in Otago.

MacKay died in 1998, aged 95.
