= McKay Lake (Minnesota) =

Lake in the state of Minnesota, United States

- Location within Minnesota
- Location: Clearwater County, Minnesota
- Coordinates: 47°9′54″N 95°11′45″W
- Type: lake

McKay Lake is a lake in Clearwater County, Minnesota, in the United States.

McKay Lake was named for Rev. Stanley A. McKay, who baptized people in this lake in 1891.

== See also ==
- List of lakes in Minnesota
