= McKee Creek (British Columbia) =

Coordinates: 59°27′43″N 133°37′19″W

McKee Creek is a creek located in the Atlin Country region of British Columbia. The creek flows into Atlin Lake from the east side. It is located 8 miles south of Atlin Town and is 7 miles in length. McKee Creek was first discovered in 1898, and since then has been hand-mined and hydraulicked. Outfits such as Atlin Mining Company have worked the creek, with the largest gold nugget recovered from the creek weighing just over 28 ounces. McKee Creek was a consistent mining producer well into the 1930s.
