= Kevin McKay (artist) =

Australian artist

- Occupation: Artist (painter)
- Spouse: Elizabeth (Liz) Sukumaran

Kevin McKay (born 1966) is a self-taught Australian artist whose skills attracted a great deal of early attention. Pictured below are some of his rare early paintings. "Lazarus" and "Feiheit" are three dimensional paintings.

McKay won his first major art prize when he was just 15 - the prize was presented by artist Clifton Pugh. In 1985, at age 19, he won the International Youth Art Prize for his naïve work "A New Beginning", a modern interpretation of Noah's Ark. The prize was presented by Prime Minister Bob Hawke, who was so impressed with the work that he used it for the Hawke family Christmas cards.

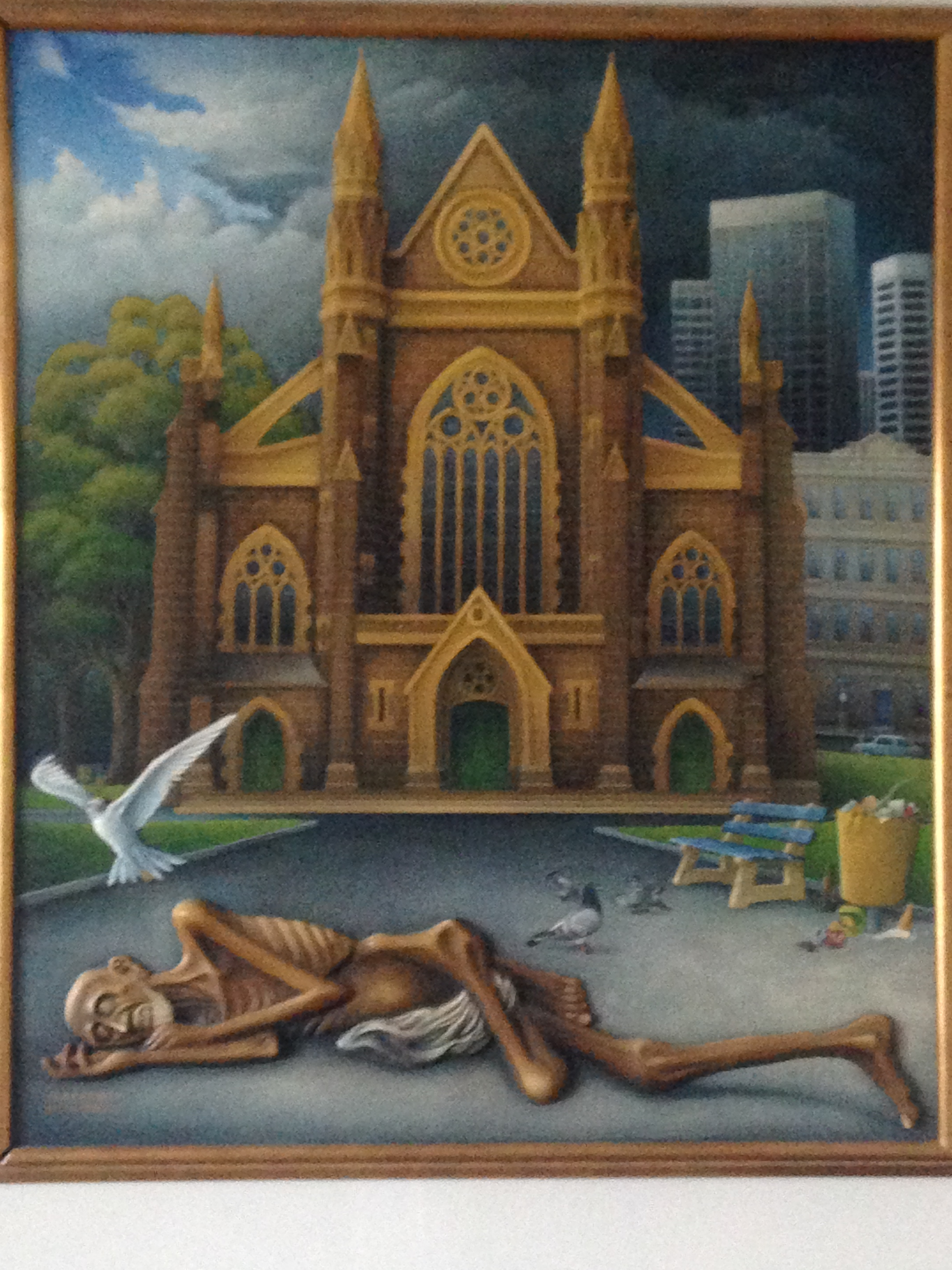
Lazarus (circa 1986)

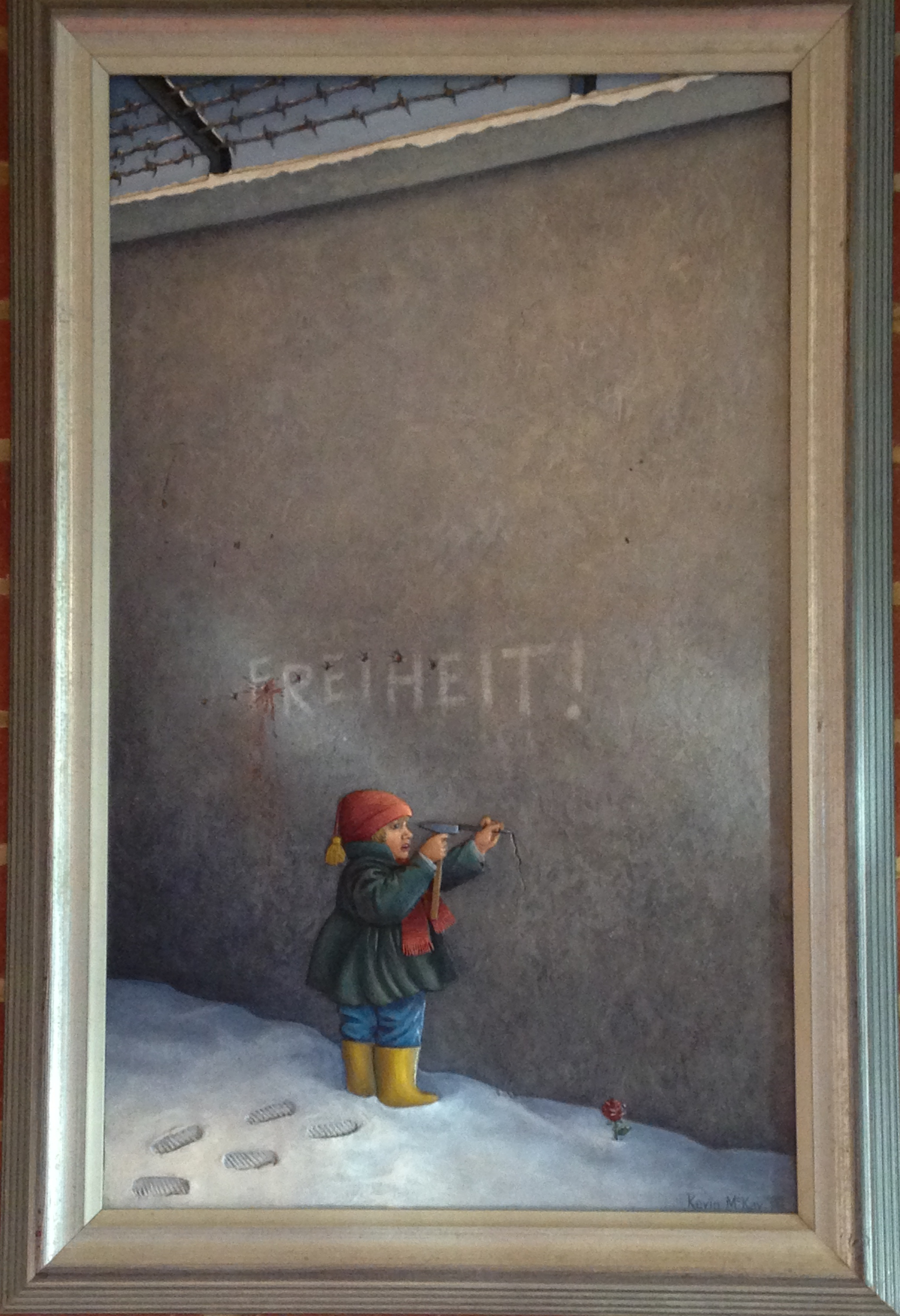
Feiheit (circa 1990)

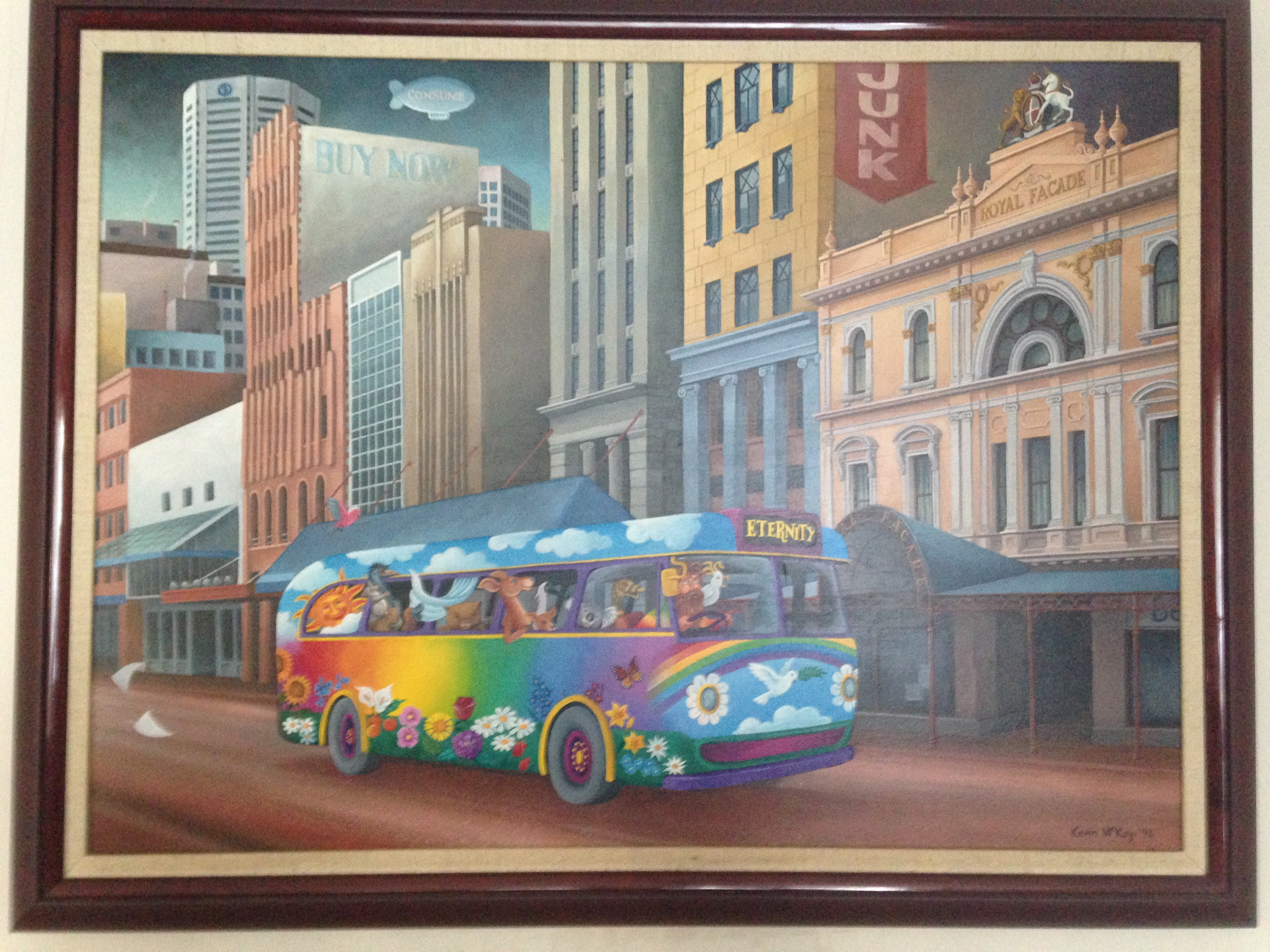
"Eternity" (circa 1992)
