= McKee Creek (West Virginia) =

Stream in West Virginia, U.S.

Coordinates: 38°13′35″N 80°52′56″W

McKee Creek is a stream in the U.S. state of West Virginia.

McKee Creek was named after William McKee, a pioneer settler.

== See also ==
- List of rivers of West Virginia
