= Mackie (surname) =

Mackie /ˈmæki/ is a surname of Scottish origin. Notable people with the surname include:

- Alec Mackie (1903–1984), Irish footballer with Arsenal F.C. and Portsmouth F.C.
- Alex Mackie (1870–unknown), Scottish football manager with Middlesbrough F.C.
- Andrew Mackie (born 1984), Australian rules footballer with the Geelong Football Club
- Anthony Mackie (born 1978), American actor
- Bella Mackie (born 1983), English author and journalist
- Bob Mackie (1939–2026), American fashion designer
- Calvin Mackie (born 1969), American entrepreneur (Older brother of actor Anthony Mackie)
- Charles Mackie (Scottish footballer) (1882–unknown), played for Aberdeen, West Ham United and Manchester United
- Charles Mackie (New Zealand footballer), New Zealand international footballer in the 1930s
- Cloe and Holly Mackie (born 1997), twin British actresses
- Darren Mackie (born 1982), Scottish footballer
- David Mackie (1836–1910), a founder and builder of Scammon, Kansas, US; first President of the Scammon State Bank
- F. Reynolds Mackie (died 1972), American politician from Maryland
- Frank H. Mackie (died 1939), American politician and veterinarian
- Gael Mackie (born 1988), Canadian gymnast and Olympic athlete
- Greg Mackie, Australian arts promoter
- Greg Clark Mackie (born 1949), American audio engineer and inventor
- Howard Mackie (born 1958), American comic book editor and writer
- Jamie Mackie (born 1985), Scottish footballer
- Jason Mackie (born 1968), New Zealand rugby league player
- Jerry Mackie (footballer) (1894–1959), Scottish footballer with Portsmouth F.C. and Southampton F.C.
- Jerry Mackie (politician) (born 1962), Alaska businessman and state legislator
- John Mackie (disambiguation), several people
- Josephine Mackie Corcoran (1894–1967), American politician from Maryland
- John Leslie Mackie (1917–1981), Australian philosopher
- Lise Mackie (born 1975), Australian freestyle swimmer
- Neil Mackie (born 1946), Scottish tenor and professor of music
- Osbert Mackie (1868–1927), English rugby union player
- Pat Mackie (1914–2009), New Zealand miner and unionist
- Pearl Mackie (born 1987), British actress, dancer, and singer
- Penelope Mackie, British academic
- Sir Peter Mackie (1855–1924), a Scottish whisky distiller
- Peter Mackie (footballer) (born 1958), Scottish footballer
- Philip Mackie (1918–1985), British film and television screenwriter
- Richard Mackie (1851–1923), Scottish businessman
- Richard D. Mackie (1922–2013), American politician from Maryland
- Samuel Joseph Mackie (1823–1902), British geologist, inventor, and editor
- Sean Mackie (born 1998), Scottish footballer
- Shamele Mackie (born 1978), American rapper
- Sheila Mackie (1928–2010), English painter and illustrator
- Suzanne Mackie, British producer
- Thomas Mackie (disambiguation), several people
- William Mackie (1799–1860), early Australian settler and judge

== See also ==
- Mackey (disambiguation)
- McKie (surname)
