= Squier (surname) =

Squier is a surname. Notable people with the surname include:

- Billy Squier (born 1950), American rock musician
- Carl Browne Squier (1893–1967), American World War I aviation pioneer
- Cecil Clyde Squier (died 1951), American politician from Maryland
- Ephraim George Squier (1821–1888), American archaeologist
- George Owen Squier (1863–1934), American inventor
- James Wilson Squier (died 1940), American politician and lawyer from Maryland
- Ken Squier (1935-2023), American sportscaster and motorsports editor
- Mark Squier, American political consultant
- J. Bentley Squier, MD, FACS, (1873–1948) was the 16th President of the American College of Surgeons and Urologist-in-Chief at Columbia-Presbyterian Hospital from 1928–1939
