= 2021 Seattle Seahawks season =

American football team season

- Owner: Estate of Paul Allen
- General manager: John Schneider
- Head coach: Pete Carroll
- Home stadium: Lumen Field

Results
- Record: 7–10
- Division place: 4th NFC West
- Playoffs: Did not qualify
- All-Pros: 1: LB Bobby Wagner (2nd team)
- Pro Bowlers: 4: QB Russell Wilson; T Duane Brown; MLB Bobby Wagner; FS Quandre Diggs

Uniform
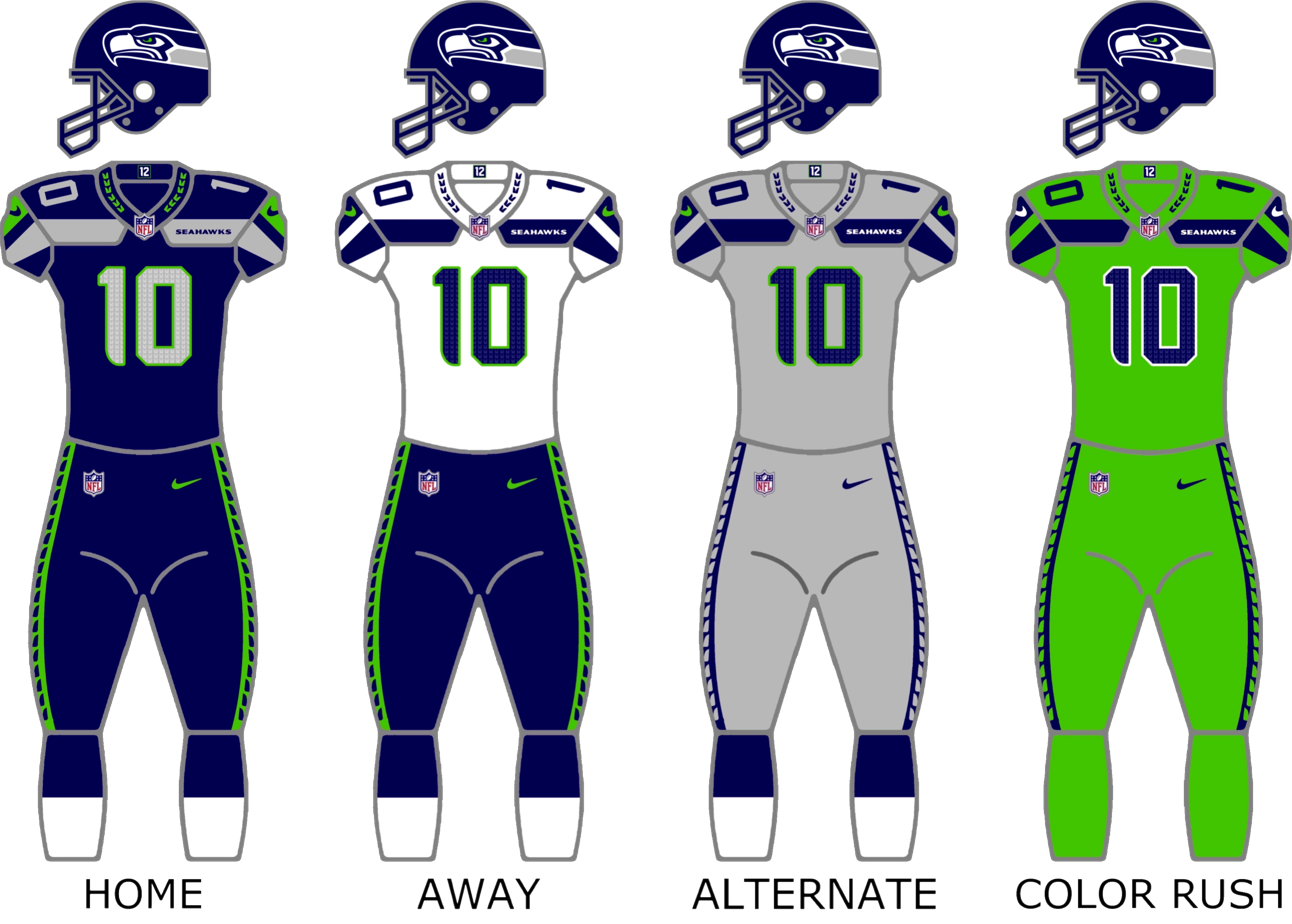

The 2021 season was the Seattle Seahawks' 46th season in the National Football League (NFL), their 20th playing their home games at their current venue, Lumen Field, as well as their 12th under head coach Pete Carroll.

The Seahawks failed to improve on the previous year's 12–4 record after their Week 7 loss to the New Orleans Saints. After their 20–10 loss to the division rival and the eventual Super Bowl LVI Champion, the Los Angeles Rams, in Week 15, the Seahawks suffered their first (and, as of 2025, only) losing season since 2011, and their only losing season of the Russell Wilson era. Following their Week 16 loss to the Chicago Bears, the Seahawks suffered their first double-digit losing season since 2009, finished last in their division for the first time since 1996, when they played in the AFC West, and were eliminated from playoff contention for the first time since 2017.

The Seahawks continued to struggle defensively from the previous year, ranking dead last in total yards allowed, giving up a total of 2,254 yards in the first five games of season and were on pace to give up the most yards in a season in NFL history for the second straight year. Overall, the Seahawks allowed 6,445 yards, or 379.1 per game. Wilson also missed a game for the first time in his NFL career, missing three games after injuring his middle finger in Week 5 against the Rams. Backup quarterback Geno Smith would start in Wilson's absence and eventually become the full time starter the following season.

This was the first season since 2010 without longtime linebacker K. J. Wright, who signed with the Las Vegas Raiders on September 6, 2021. It was also the last season with Russell Wilson on the roster and the final season of linebacker Bobby Wagner's first stint with the team. Wagner was released on March 9, 2022, and signed a five-year contract worth up to $65 million with the defending Super Bowl LVI champion Los Angeles Rams on March 31 before being cut and returning to the Seahawks the next season, while Wilson was traded to the Denver Broncos along with a 4th-round pick for quarterback Drew Lock, defensive lineman Shelby Harris, tight end Noah Fant, two first-round picks, two second-round picks and a fifth-round pick on March 16. Both were the last remaining members from their 2013 Super Bowl-winning season on the roster.

== Draft ==
2021 Seattle Seahawks draft
Round	Selection	Player	Position	College	Notes
2	56	D'Wayne Eskridge	WR	Western Michigan	
4	137	Tre Brown	CB	Oklahoma	From Tampa Bay
6	208	Stone Forsythe	OT	Florida	

Notes

- The Seahawks traded safety Bradley McDougald, first- and third-round selections, and a 2022 first-round selection to the New York Jets in exchange for Jamal Adams and a 2022 fourth-round selection.
- The Seahawks traded their fourth-round selection (No. 129) to the Tampa Bay Buccaneers in exchange for the Buccaneers' fourth-round selection (No. 137) and a sixth-round compensatory selection (No. 217).
- The Seahawks traded their fifth-round selection to the Las Vegas Raiders in exchange for offensive guard Gabe Jackson.
- The Seahawks traded a sixth-round selection to the Miami Dolphins in exchange for a 2020 seventh-round selection. This selection was traded to the Chicago Bears. The Bears traded this selection back to the Seahawks in exchange for a sixth-round selection (No. 217), originally from the Tampa Bay Buccaneers, and the Seahawks' seventh-round selection (No. 250).
- The Seahawks received safety Quandre Diggs and a seventh-round selection from the Detroit Lions in exchange for a 2020 fifth-round selection.
- The Seahawks traded center B. J. Finney and the Detroit Lions's seventh-round selection to Cincinnati Bengals for defensive end Carlos Dunlap.

== Personnel ==
=== Staff / Coaches ===
2021 Seattle Seahawks staff
Front office: Owning entity – Paul G. Allen Trust; Chairwoman/trustee – Jody Allen; Vice chairman – Bert Kolde; President – Chuck Arnold; Executive vice president/general manager – John Schneider; Vice president of football administration – Matt Thomas; Vice president of player personnel – Trent Kirchner; Director of college scouting – Matt Berry; Assistant director of college scouting – Aaron Hineline; Area scout – Jason Barnes; Director of pro personnel – Nolan Teasley; Assistant director of pro personnel – Willie Schneider; Personnel executive – Alonzo Highsmith; Head coaches: Head coach/executive vice president of football operations – Pete Carroll; Associate head coach – Carl Smith; Assistant head coach/defensive line – Clint Hurtt; Offensive coaches: Offensive coordinator – Shane Waldron; Run game coordinator – Andy Dickerson; Passing game coordinator – Dave Canales; Quarterbacks – Austin Davis; Assistant quarterbacks – Brad Idzik; Running backs – Chad Morton; Wide receivers – Nate Carroll; Assistant wide receivers – Kerry Joseph; Tight ends – Pat McPherson; Offensive line – Mike Solari; Assistant offensive line – Keli'i Kekuewa	Defensive coaches: Defensive coordinator – Ken Norton Jr.; Linebackers – John Glenn; Passing game coordinator – Andre Curtis; Defensive assistant/linebackers – Aaron Curry; Defensive assistant/defensive line – Damione Lewis; Defensive quality coach – DeShawn Shead; Special teams coaches: Special teams coordinator – Larry Izzo; Assistant special teams coach – Tracy Smith; Strength and conditioning: Head strength and conditioning – Ivan Lewis; Assistant strength and conditioning – Jamie Yanchar; Assistant strength and conditioning – Thomas Garcia; Assistant strength and conditioning – Mark Philipp; Assistant strength and conditioning – Grant Steen

=== Final roster ===
2021 Seattle Seahawks roster
Quarterbacks (QB): 17 Jacob Eason; 7 Geno Smith; 3 Russell Wilson; Running backs (RB): 44 Nick Bellore FB; 31 DeeJay Dallas; 25 Travis Homer; 34 Josh Johnson; 20 Rashaad Penny; Wide receivers (WR): 1 D'Wayne Eskridge; 19 Penny Hart; 16 Tyler Lockett; 14 DK Metcalf; 18 Freddie Swain; Tight ends (TE): 89 Will Dissly; 81 Gerald Everett; 85 Tyler Mabry; 84 Colby Parkinson	Offensive linemen (OL): 76 Duane Brown T; 74 Jake Curhan T; 78 Stone Forsythe T; 60 Phil Haynes G; 66 Gabe Jackson G; 73 Jamarco Jones T; 68 Damien Lewis G; 77 Ethan Pocic C; 64 Dakoda Shepley G; Defensive linemen (DL): 91 L. J. Collier DE; 8 Carlos Dunlap DE; 97 Poona Ford DT; 94 Rasheem Green DE; 51 Kerry Hyder DE; 10 Benson Mayowa DE; 90 Bryan Mone DT; 92 Robert Nkemdiche DE; 52 Darrell Taylor DE	Linebackers (LB): 57 Cody Barton MLB; 56 Jordyn Brooks OLB; 58 Tanner Muse ILB; 54 Bobby Wagner MLB; Defensive backs (DB): 28 Ugo Amadi FS; 36 Blessuan Austin CB; 6 Quandre Diggs FS; 23 Sidney Jones CB; 2 D. J. Reed CB; 29 John Reid CB; 39 Nigel Warrior CB; Special teams (ST): 4 Michael Dickson P; 5 Jason Myers K; 69 Tyler Ott LS	Practice squad: 67 Myles Adams DT (COVID-19); 87 Matt Cole WR; 43 Aaron Donkor OLB (IPP); 75 Greg Eiland T; 13 Aaron Fuller WR; 62 Jarrod Hewitt DT; 30 Mike Jackson Sr. CB; 88 Cade Johnson WR; 42 Josh Jones SS; 62 Pier-Olivier Lestage G; 21 Adrian Peterson RB (PS/I); 48 Edmond Robinson MLB; 79 Niles Scott NT; 11 Cody Thompson WR; 47 Lakiem Williams TE; Reserve: 33 Jamal Adams SS (IR); 27 Marquise Blair SS (IR); 22 Tre Brown CB (IR); 55 Ben Burr-Kirven OLB (IR); 32 Chris Carson RB (IR); 41 Alex Collins RB (IR); 61 Kyle Fuller C (COVID-19); 38 Gavin Heslop CB (IR); 26 Ryan Neal SS (COVID-19); 59 Jon Rhattigan OLB (IR); 15 John Ursua WR (IR); 98 Alton Robinson DE (COVID-19); 72 Brandon Shell T (IR); 48 Marcus Webb DE (IR); 99 Al Woods DT (COVID-19); Rookies in italics 49 active, 15 reserve, 12 practice squad (3 exempt)

== Preseason ==
The Seahawks' preseason schedule was announced on May 12.

Week	Date	Opponent	Result	Record	Venue	Recap
1	August 14	at Las Vegas Raiders	L 7–20	0–1	Allegiant Stadium	Recap
2	August 21	Denver Broncos	L 3–30	0–2	Lumen Field	Recap
3	August 28	Los Angeles Chargers	W 27–0	1–2	Lumen Field	Recap

== Regular season ==
=== Schedule ===
The Seahawks' regular season schedule was announced on May 12.

Divisional matchups: the NFC West played the NFC North and the AFC South.

Week	Date	Opponent	Result	Record	Venue	Recap
1	September 12	at Indianapolis Colts	**W** 28–16	1–0	Lucas Oil Stadium	Recap
2	September 19	Tennessee Titans	**L** 30–33 (OT)	1–1	Lumen Field	Recap
3	September 26	at Minnesota Vikings	**L** 17–30	1–2	U.S. Bank Stadium	Recap
4	October 3	at **San Francisco 49ers**	**W** 28–21	2–2	Levi's Stadium	Recap
5	October 7	**Los Angeles Rams**	**L** 17–26	2–3	Lumen Field	Recap
6	October 17	at Pittsburgh Steelers	**L** 20–23 (OT)	2–4	Heinz Field	Recap
7	October 25	New Orleans Saints	**L** 10–13	2–5	Lumen Field	Recap
8	October 31	Jacksonville Jaguars	**W** 31–7	3–5	Lumen Field	Recap
9	Bye					
10	November 14	at Green Bay Packers	**L** 0–17	3–6	Lambeau Field	Recap
11	November 21	**Arizona Cardinals**	**L** 13–23	3–7	Lumen Field	Recap
12	November 29	at Washington Football Team	**L** 15–17	3–8	FedExField	Recap
13	December 5	**San Francisco 49ers**	**W** 30–23	4–8	Lumen Field	Recap
14	December 12	at Houston Texans	**W** 33–13	5–8	NRG Stadium	Recap
15	December 21	at **Los Angeles Rams**	**L** 10–20	5–9	SoFi Stadium	Recap
16	December 26	Chicago Bears	**L** 24–25	5–10	Lumen Field	Recap
17	January 2, 2022	Detroit Lions	**W** 51–29	6–10	Lumen Field	Recap
18	January 9, 2022	at **Arizona Cardinals**	**W** 38–30	7–10	State Farm Stadium	Recap

Note: Intra-division opponents are in bold text.

=== Game summaries ===
==== Week 1: at Indianapolis Colts ====
Week 1: Seattle Seahawks at Indianapolis Colts – Game summary

Quarter	1	2	3	4	Total
**Seahawks**	7	14	0	7	**28**
Colts	3	7	0	6	**16**

at Lucas Oil Stadium, Indianapolis, Indiana

- Date: September 12
- Game time: 1:00 p.m. EDT/10:00 a.m. PDT
- Game weather: None (retractable roof closed)
- Game attendance: 63,347
- Referee: Tony Corrente
- TV announcers (Fox): Kenny Albert, Jonathan Vilma and Sara Walsh
- Recap, Game Book

Game information

**First quarter**

- IND – Rodrigo Blankenship 21-yard field goal, 5:41. Colts 3–0. **Drive: 14 plays, 72 yards, 9:19.**
- SEA – Tyler Lockett 23-yard pass from Russell Wilson (Jason Myers kick), 1:26. Seahawks 7–3. **Drive: 9 plays, 81 yards, 4:15.**

**Second quarter**

- SEA – Gerald Everett 9-yard pass from Russell Wilson (Jason Myers kick), 11:22. Seahawks 14–3. **Drive: 7 plays, 61 yards, 3:28.**
- IND – Zach Pascal 10-yard pass from Carson Wentz (Rodrigo Blankenship kick), 7:04. Seahawks 14–10. **Drive: 7 plays, 68 yards, 4:18.**
- SEA – Tyler Lockett 69-yard pass from Russell Wilson (Jason Myers kick), 0:41. Seahawks 21–10. **Drive: 6 plays, 83 yards, 2:19.**

**Third quarter**

- No scoring plays.

**Fourth quarter**

- SEA – DK Metcalf 15-yard pass from Russell Wilson (Jason Myers kick), 6:41. Seahawks 28–10. **Drive: 7 plays, 73 yards, 3:15.**
- IND – Zach Pascal 11-yard pass from Carson Wentz (run failed), 7:04. Seahawks 28–16. **Drive: 10 plays, 75 yards, 4:33.**

**Top passers**

- SEA – Russell Wilson – 18/23, 254 yards, 4 TD
- IND – Carson Wentz – 25/38, 251 yards, 2 TD

**Top rushers**

- SEA – Chris Carson – 16 rushes, 91 yards
- IND – Jonathan Taylor – 17 rushes, 56 yards

**Top receivers**

- SEA – Tyler Lockett – 4 receptions, 100 yards, 2 TD
- IND – Jonathan Taylor – 6 receptions, 60 yards

==== Week 2: vs. Tennessee Titans ====
Week 2: Tennessee Titans at Seattle Seahawks – Game summary

Quarter	1	2	3	4	OT	Total
**Titans**	3	6	7	14	3	**33**
Seahawks	3	21	0	6	0	**30**

at Lumen Field, Seattle, Washington

- Date: September 19
- Game time: 1:25 p.m. PDT
- Game weather: Cloudy, 61 °F (16 °C)
- Game attendance: 68,585
- Referee: John Hussey
- TV announcers (CBS): Andrew Catalon, James Lofton and Sherree Burruss
- Recap, Game Book

Game information

**First quarter**

- SEA – Jason Myers 31-yard field goal, 9:25. Seahawks 3–0. **Drive: 5 plays, 57 yards, 1:58.**
- TEN – Randy Bullock 33-yard field goal, 2:45. Tied 3–3. **Drive: 13 plays, 70 yards, 6:40.**

**Second quarter**

- TEN – Randy Bullock 30-yard field goal, 8:18. Titans 6–3. **Drive: 7 plays, 68 yards, 4:29.**
- SEA – Tyler Lockett 63-yard pass from Russell Wilson (Jason Myers kick), 6:34. Seahawks 10–6. **Drive: 3 plays, 83 yards, 1:44.**
- SEA – Chris Carson 2-yard run (Jason Myers kick), 5:20. Seahawks 17–6. **Drive: 2 plays, 6 yards, 0:28.**
- TEN – Randy Bullock 24-yard field goal, 1:05. Seahawks 17–9. **Drive: 8 plays, 63 yards, 4:15.**
- SEA – Chris Carson 1-yard run (Jason Myers kick), 0:17. Seahawks 24–9. **Drive: 7 plays, 75 yards, 0:48.**

**Third quarter**

- TEN – Derrick Henry 9-yard run (Randy Bullock kick), 10:37. Seahawks 24–16. **Drive: 8 plays, 80 yards, 4:23.**

**Fourth quarter**

- SEA – Freddie Swain 68-yard pass from Russell Wilson (kick failed), 13:06. Seahawks 30–16. **Drive: 3 plays, 66 yards, 1:54.**
- TEN – Derrick Henry 60-yard run (Randy Bullock kick), 12:17. Seahawks 30–23. **Drive: 2 plays, 75 yards, 0:49.**
- TEN – Derrick Henry 1-yard run (Randy Bullock kick), 0:29. Tied 30–30. **Drive: 12 plays, 68 yards, 3:44.**

**Overtime**

- TEN – Randy Bullock 36-yard field goal, 4:45. Titans 33–30. **Drive: 5 plays, 21 yards, 2:34.**

**Top passers**

- TEN – Ryan Tannehill – 27/40, 347 yards
- SEA – Russell Wilson – 22/31, 343 yards, 2 TD

**Top rushers**

- TEN – Derrick Henry – 35 rushes, 182 yards, 3 TD
- SEA – Chris Carson – 13 rushes, 31 yards, 2 TD

**Top receivers**

- TEN – Julio Jones – 6 receptions, 128 yards
- SEA – Tyler Lockett – 8 receptions, 178 yards, TD

==== Week 3: at Minnesota Vikings ====
Week 3: Seattle Seahawks at Minnesota Vikings – Game summary

Quarter	1	2	3	4	Total
Seahawks	10	7	0	0	**17**
**Vikings**	7	14	3	6	**30**

at U.S. Bank Stadium, Minneapolis, Minnesota

- Date: September 26
- Game time: 3:25 p.m. CDT/1:25 p.m. PDT
- Game weather: None (indoor stadium)
- Game attendance: 66,729
- Referee: Clay Martin
- TV announcers (Fox): Kevin Kugler, Mark Sanchez and Laura Okmin
- Recap, Game Book

Game information

**First quarter**

- SEA – DK Metcalf 10-yard pass from Russell Wilson (Jason Myers kick), 10:26. Seahawks 7–0. **Drive: 9 plays, 75 yards, 4:34.**
- MIN – Tyler Conklin 7-yard pass from Kirk Cousins (Greg Joseph kick), 6:37. Tied 7–7. **Drive: 7 plays, 70 yards, 3:49.**
- SEA – Jason Myers 53-yard field goal, 0:27. Seahawks 10–7. **Drive: 11 plays, 40 yards, 6:10.**

**Second quarter**

- SEA – Chris Carson 30-yard run (Jason Myers kick), 11:12. Seahawks 17–7. **Drive: 6 plays, 76 yards, 3:33.**
- MIN – Adam Thielen 15-yard pass from Kirk Cousins (Greg Joseph kick), 5:28. Seahawks 17–14. **Drive: 9 plays, 85 yards, 5:44.**
- MIN – Justin Jefferson 3-yard pass from Kirk Cousins (Greg Joseph kick), 0:16. Vikings 21–17. **Drive: 12 plays, 66 yards, 2:58.**

**Third quarter**

- MIN – Greg Joseph 43-yard field goal, 6:34. Vikings 24–17. **Drive: 16 plays, 50 yards, 8:26.**

**Fourth quarter**

- MIN – Greg Joseph 34-yard field goal, 13:47. Vikings 27–17. **Drive: 11 plays, 70 yards, 5:01.**
- MIN – Greg Joseph 20-yard field goal, 4:31. Vikings 30–17. **Drive: 12 plays, 88 yards, 7:08.**

**Top passers**

- SEA – Russell Wilson – 23/32, 298 yards, TD
- MIN – Kirk Cousins – 30/38, 323 yards, 3 TD

**Top rushers**

- SEA – Chris Carson – 12 rushes, 80 yards, TD
- MIN – Alexander Mattison – 26 rushes, 112 yards

**Top receivers**

- SEA – DK Metcalf – 6 receptions, 107 yards, TD
- MIN – Justin Jefferson – 9 receptions, 118 yards, TD

This was Seattle's first loss to the Vikings since 2009.

==== Week 4: at San Francisco 49ers ====
Week 4: Seattle Seahawks at San Francisco 49ers – Game summary

Quarter	1	2	3	4	Total
**Seahawks**	0	7	14	7	**28**
49ers	7	0	6	8	**21**

at Levi's Stadium, Santa Clara, California

- Date: October 3
- Game time: 1:05 p.m. PDT
- Game weather: Hazy skies, 88 °F (31 °C)
- Game attendance: 68,912
- Referee: Carl Cheffers
- TV announcers (Fox): Adam Amin, Mark Schlereth and Shannon Spake
- Recap, Game Book

Game information

**First quarter**

- SF – Ross Dwelley 21-yard pass from Jimmy Garoppolo (Mitch Wishnowsky kick), 9:35. 49ers 7–0. **Drive: 8 plays, 71 yards, 4:13.**

**Second quarter**

- SEA – DK Metcalf 12-yard pass from Russell Wilson (Jason Myers kick), 1:54. Tied 7–7. **Drive: 6 plays, 80 yards, 2:55.**

**Third quarter**

- SEA – Russell Wilson 16-yard run (Jason Myers kick), 5:22. Seahawks 14–7. **Drive: 7 plays, 66 yards, 3:31.**
- SEA – Freddie Swain 13-yard pass from Russell Wilson (Jason Myers kick), 4:26. Seahawks 21–7. **Drive: 2 plays, 14 yards, 0:50.**
- SF – Deebo Samuel 76-yard pass from Trey Lance (kick failed), 2:10. Seahawks 21–13. **Drive: 4 plays, 89 yards, 2:16.**

**Fourth quarter**

- SEA – Alex Collins 14-yard run (Jason Myers kick), 12:07. Seahawks 28–13. **Drive: 10 plays, 81 yards, 5:03.**
- SF – Deebo Samuel 8-yard pass from Trey Lance (Trey Lance run), 1:20. Seahawks 28–21. **Drive: 13 plays, 80 yards, 3:10.**

**Top passers**

- SEA – Russell Wilson – 16/23, 149 yards, 2 TD
- SF – Jimmy Garoppolo – 14/23, 165 yards, TD, INT

**Top rushers**

- SEA – Alex Collins – 10 rushes, 44 yards, TD
- SF – Trey Sermon – 19 rushes, 89 yards

**Top receivers**

- SEA – DK Metcalf – 4 receptions, 65 yards, TD
- SF – Deebo Samuel – 8 receptions, 156 yards, 2 TD

==== Week 5: vs. Los Angeles Rams ====
Week 5: Los Angeles Rams at Seattle Seahawks – Game summary

Quarter	1	2	3	4	Total
**Rams**	0	3	13	10	**26**
Seahawks	0	7	0	10	**17**

at Lumen Field, Seattle, Washington

- Date: October 7
- Game time: 5:20 p.m. PDT
- Game weather: Sunny, 61 °F (16 °C)
- Game attendance: 68,747
- Referee: Ronald Torbert
- TV announcers (Fox/NFLN/Prime Video): Joe Buck, Troy Aikman, Erin Andrews and Kristina Pink
- Recap, Game Book

Game information

**First quarter**

- **No scoring plays.**

**Second quarter**

- SEA – DK Metcalf 19-yard pass from Russell Wilson (Jason Myers kick), 9:04. Seahawks 7–0. **Drive: 3 plays, 83 yards, 1:37.**
- LAR – Matt Gay 31-yard field goal, 1:08. Seahawks 7–3. **Drive: 14 plays, 63 yards, 7:56.**

**Third quarter**

- LAR – Darrell Henderson 5-yard run (kick failed), 7:56. Rams 9–7. **Drive: 8 plays, 96 yards, 3:07.**
- LAR – Tyler Higbee 13-yard pass from Matthew Stafford (Matt Gay kick), 4:46. Rams 16–7. **Drive: 5 plays, 82 yards, 2:05.**

**Fourth quarter**

- SEA – DK Metcalf 23-yard pass from Geno Smith (Jason Myers kick), 9:16. Rams 16–14. **Drive: 10 plays, 98 yards, 5:26.**
- LAR – Sony Michel 2-yard run (Matt Gay kick), 6:08. Rams 23–14. **Drive: 6 plays, 73 yards, 3:08.**
- SEA – Jason Myers 32-yard field goal, 2:45. Rams 23–17. **Drive: 11 plays, 46 yards, 3:23.**
- LAR – Matt Gay 47-yard field goal, 0:24. Rams 26–17. **Drive: 4 plays, 3 yards, 1:38.**

**Top passers**

- LAR – Matthew Stafford – 25/37, 365 yards, TD, INT
- SEA – Russell Wilson – 11/16, 152 yards, TD, INT

**Top rushers**

- LAR – Darrell Henderson – 17 rushes, 82 yards, TD
- SEA – Alex Collins – 15 rushes, 47 yards

**Top receivers**

- LAR – Robert Woods – 12 receptions, 150 yards
- SEA – DK Metcalf – 5 receptions, 98 yards, 2 TD

==== Week 6: at Pittsburgh Steelers ====
Week 6: Seattle Seahawks at Pittsburgh Steelers – Game summary

Quarter	1	2	3	4	OT	Total
Seahawks	0	0	14	6	0	**20**
**Steelers**	0	14	3	3	3	**23**

at Heinz Field, Pittsburgh, Pennsylvania

- Date: October 17
- Game time: 8:20 p.m. EDT/5:20 p.m. PDT
- Game weather: Mostly cloudy, 54 °F (12 °C)
- Game attendance: 60,821
- Referee: Shawn Smith
- TV announcers (NBC): Mike Tirico, Cris Collinsworth, Michele Tafoya and Terry McAulay
- Recap, Game Book

Game information

**First quarter**

- **No scoring plays.**

**Second quarter**

- PIT – Najee Harris 5-yard pass from Ben Roethlisberger (Chris Boswell kick), 10:01. Steelers 7–0. **Drive: 8 plays, 54 yards, 4:10.**
- PIT – Eric Ebron 1-yard run (Chris Boswell kick), 1:04. Steelers 14–0. **Drive: 14 plays, 84 yards, 6:59.**

**Third quarter**

- SEA – Alex Collins 2-yard run (Jason Myers kick), 9:55. Steelers 14–7. **Drive: 10 plays, 75 yards, 5:05.**
- PIT – Chris Boswell 27-yard field goal, 5:46. Steelers 17–7. **Drive: 9 plays, 66 yards, 4:09.**
- SEA – Will Dissly 1-yard pass from Geno Smith (Jason Myers kick), 3:02. Steelers 17–14. **Drive: 6 plays, 60 yards, 2:44.**

**Fourth quarter**

- SEA – Jason Myers 40-yard field goal, 12:59. Tied 17–17. **Drive: 8 plays, 36 yards, 3:26.**
- PIT – Chris Boswell 52-yard field goal, 1:30. Steelers 20–17. **Drive: 9 plays, 40 yards, 3:49.**
- SEA – Jason Myers 43-yard field goal, 0:00. Tied 20–20. **Drive: 9 plays, 50 yards, 1:30.**

**Overtime**

- PIT – Chris Boswell 37-yard field goal, 2:50. Steelers 23–20. **Drive: 3 plays, 3 yards, 1:26.**

**Top passers**

- SEA – Geno Smith – 23/32, 209 yards, TD
- PIT – Ben Roethlisberger – 29/40, 229 yards, TD

**Top rushers**

- SEA – Alex Collins – 20 rushes, 101 yards, TD
- PIT – Najee Harris – 24 rushes, 81 yards

**Top receivers**

- SEA – DK Metcalf – 6 receptions, 58 yards
- PIT – Diontae Johnson – 9 receptions, 71 yards

==== Week 7: vs. New Orleans Saints ====
Week 7: New Orleans Saints at Seattle Seahawks – Game summary

Quarter	1	2	3	4	Total
**Saints**	0	10	0	3	**13**
Seahawks	7	0	3	0	**10**

at Lumen Field, Seattle, Washington

- Date: October 25
- Game time: 5:15 p.m. PDT
- Game weather: Rain, 55 °F (13 °C)
- Game attendance: 68,563
- Referee: Shawn Hochuli
- TV announcers (ESPN): Steve Levy, Brian Griese, Louis Riddick, Lisa Salters and John Parry
- Recap, Game Book

Game information

**First quarter**

- SEA – DK Metcalf 84-yard pass from Geno Smith (Jason Myers kick), 10:08. Seahawks 7–0. **Drive: 2 plays, 84 yards, 0:51.**

**Second quarter**

- NO – Brian Johnson 21-yard field goal, 4:23. Seahawks 7–3. **Drive: 19 plays, 86 yards, 10:16.**
- NO – Alvin Kamara 13-yard pass from Jameis Winston (Brian Johnson kick), 0:40. Saints 10–7. **Drive: 7 plays, 85 yards, 1:46.**

**Third quarter**

- SEA – Jason Myers 50-yard field goal, 0:14. Tied 10–10. **Drive: 4 plays, 0 yards, 1:20.**

**Fourth quarter**

- NO – Brian Johnson 33-yard field goal, 1:56. Saints 13–10. **Drive: 13 plays, 42 yards, 4:48.**

**Top passers**

- NO – Jameis Winston – 19/35, 222 yards, TD
- SEA – Geno Smith – 12/22, 167 yards, TD

**Top rushers**

- NO – Alvin Kamara – 20 rushes, 51 yards
- SEA – Alex Collins – 16 rushes, 35 yards

**Top receivers**

- NO – Alvin Kamara – 10 receptions, 128 yards, TD
- SEA – DK Metcalf – 2 receptions, 96 yards, TD

==== Week 8: vs. Jacksonville Jaguars ====
Week 8: Jacksonville Jaguars at Seattle Seahawks – Game summary

Quarter	1	2	3	4	Total
Jaguars	0	0	0	7	**7**
**Seahawks**	7	10	7	7	**31**

at Lumen Field, Seattle, Washington

- Date: October 31
- Game time: 1:05 p.m. PDT
- Game weather: Sunny, 54 °F (12 °C)
- Game attendance: 67,243
- Referee: Adrian Hill
- TV announcers (CBS): Greg Gumbel, Adam Archuleta and AJ Ross
- Recap, Game Book

Game information

**First quarter**

- SEA – Geno Smith 1-yard run (Jason Myers kick), 4:19. Seahawks 7–0. **Drive: 10 plays, 80 yards, 5:09.**

**Second quarter**

- SEA – DK Metcalf 16-yard pass from Geno Smith (Jason Myers kick), 9:24. Seahawks 14–0. **Drive: 8 plays, 73 yards, 4:06.**
- SEA – Jason Myers 31-yard field goal, 0:06. Seahawks 17–0. **Drive: 12 plays, 47 yards, 6:00.**

**Third quarter**

- SEA – DK Metcalf 5-yard pass from Geno Smith (Jason Myers kick), 8:09. Seahawks 24–0. **Drive: 8 plays, 62 yards, 3:42.**

**Fourth quarter**

- JAX – Jamal Agnew 9-yard pass from Trevor Lawrence (Matthew Wright kick), 1:49. Seahawks 24–7. **Drive: 16 plays, 80 yards, 4:45.**
- SEA – Travis Homer 44-yard kickoff return (Jason Myers kick), 1:43. Seahawks 31–7. **Drive: 0 plays, 0 yards, 0:06.**

**Top passers**

- JAX – Trevor Lawrence – 32/54, 238 yards, TD, INT
- SEA – Geno Smith – 20/24, 195 yards, 2 TD

**Top rushers**

- JAX – Carlos Hyde – 9 rushes, 32 yards
- SEA – Alex Collins – 10 rushes, 44 yards

**Top receivers**

- JAX – Dan Arnold – 8 receptions, 68 yards
- SEA – Tyler Lockett – 12 receptions, 142 yards

==== Week 10: at Green Bay Packers ====
Week 10: Seattle Seahawks at Green Bay Packers – Game summary

Quarter	1	2	3	4	Total
Seahawks	0	0	0	0	**0**
**Packers**	0	3	0	14	**17**

at Lambeau Field, Green Bay, Wisconsin

- Date: November 14
- Game time: 3:25 p.m. CST/1:25 p.m. PST
- Game weather: Sunny, 35 °F (2 °C)
- Game attendance: 78,235
- Referee: Brad Allen
- TV announcers (CBS): Jim Nantz, Tony Romo, Tracy Wolfson and Gene Steratore
- Recap, Game Book

Game information

**First quarter**

- No scoring plays

**Second quarter**

- GB – Mason Crosby 27-yard field goal, 9:31. Packers 3–0. **Drive: 14 plays, 82 yards, 6:06.**

**Third quarter**

- No scoring plays

**Fourth quarter**

- GB – A. J. Dillon 3-yard run (Mason Crosby kick), 10:37. Packers 10–0. **Drive: 11 plays, 62 yards, 5:27.**
- GB – A. J. Dillon 2-yard run (Mason Crosby kick), 1:56. Packers 17–0. **Drive: 10 plays, 80 yards, 6:11.**

**Top passers**

- SEA – Russell Wilson – 20/40, 161 yards, 2 INT
- GB – Aaron Rodgers – 23/37, 292 yards, INT

**Top rushers**

- SEA – Alex Collins – 10 rushes, 41 yards
- GB – A. J. Dillon – 21 rushes, 66 yards, 2 TD

**Top receivers**

- SEA – Gerald Everett – 8 receptions, 63 yards
- GB – Davante Adams – 7 receptions, 78 yards

This was the first time the Seahawks were shutout in a game since Week 2 of the 2011 against the Pittsburgh Steelers. Russell Wilson return from finger injury.

==== Week 11: vs. Arizona Cardinals ====
Week 11: Arizona Cardinals at Seattle Seahawks – Game summary

Quarter	1	2	3	4	Total
**Cardinals**	7	6	3	7	**23**
Seahawks	0	6	0	7	**13**

at Lumen Field, Seattle, Washington

- Date: November 21
- Game time: 1:25 p.m. PST
- Game weather: Partly cloudy, 45 °F (7 °C)
- Game attendance: 68,833
- Referee: Clete Blakeman
- TV announcers (Fox): Kenny Albert, Jonathan Vilma and Sara Walsh
- Recap, Game Book

Game information

**First quarter**

- ARI – Zach Ertz 1-yard pass from Colt McCoy (Matt Prater kick), 2:47. Cardinals 7-0. **Drive: 16 plays, 82 yards, 9:27**

**Second quarter**

- SEA – Jason Myers 27-yard field goal, 8:23. Cardinals 7-3. **Drive: 7 plays, 36 yards, 2:05.**
- ARI – Zach Ertz 2-yard pass from Colt McCoy (kick failed, wide right), 1:52. Cardinals 13-3. **Drive: 13 plays, 92 yards, 6:31**
- SEA – Jason Myers 27-yard field goal, 1:05. Cardinals 13-6. **Drive: 7 plays, 68 yards, 0:47.**

**Third quarter**

- ARI – Matt Prater 53-yard field goal, 12:57. Cardinals 16-6. **Drive: 5 plays, 25 yards, 2:03.**

**Fourth quarter**

- SEA – DeeJay Dallas 2-yard run (Jason Myers kick), 7:05. Cardinals 16-13. **Drive: 5 plays, 74 yards, 1:51**
- ARI – James Conner 1-yard run (Matt Prater kick), 2:20. Cardinals 23-13. **Drive: 10 plays, 67 yards, 4:45**

**Top passers**

- ARI – Colt McCoy – 35/44, 328 yards, 2 TD
- SEA – Russell Wilson – 14/26, 207 yards

**Top rushers**

- ARI – James Conner – 21 rushes, 62 yards, TD
- SEA – Alex Collins – 10 rushes, 36 yards

**Top receivers**

- ARI – Zach Ertz – 8 receptions, 88 yards, 2 TD
- SEA – Tyler Lockett – 4 receptions, 115 yards

==== Week 12: at Washington Football Team ====
Week 12: Seattle Seahawks at Washington Football Team – Game summary

Quarter	1	2	3	4	Total
Seahawks	7	2	0	6	**15**
**Washington**	3	6	8	0	**17**

at FedExField, Landover, Maryland

- Date: November 29
- Game time: 8:15 p.m. EST/5:15 p.m. PST
- Game weather: Cloudy, 38 °F (3 °C)
- Game attendance: 52,680
- Referee: Clay Martin
- TV announcers (ESPN): Steve Levy, Brian Griese, Louis Riddick, Lisa Salters, and John Parry
- Preview, Game Book

Game information

**First quarter**

- WAS – Joey Slye 23-yard field goal, 2:59. Football Team 3–0. **Drive: 15 plays, 68 yards, 9:25.**
- SEA – Gerald Everett 6-yard pass from Russell Wilson (Jason Myers kick), 0:20. Seahawks 7–3. **Drive: 6 plays, 75 yards, 2:39.**

**Second quarter**

- WAS – J. D. McKissic 10-yard pass from Taylor Heinicke, 0:56. Football Team 9–7. **Drive: 9 plays, 73 yards, 2:56.**
- SEA – Rasheem Green defensive two point conversion, 0:56. Tied 9–9.

**Third quarter**

- WAS – J. D. McKissic 10-yard run (Antonio Gibson run), 8:30. Football Team 17–9. **Drive: 11 plays, 73 yards, 4:56.**

**Fourth quarter**

- SEA – Freddie Swain 32-yard pass from Russell Wilson (pass failed), 0:15. Football Team 17–15. **Drive: 10 plays, 96 yards, 2:04.**

**Top passers**

- SEA – Russell Wilson – 20/31, 247 yards, 2 TD
- WAS – Taylor Heinicke – 27/35, 223 yards, TD, INT

**Top rushers**

- SEA – Russell Wilson – 2 rushes, 16 yards
- WAS – Antonio Gibson – 29 rushes, 111 yards

**Top receivers**

- SEA – Tyler Lockett – 3 receptions, 96 yards
- WAS – Terry McLaurin – 4 receptions, 51 yards

==== Week 13: vs. San Francisco 49ers ====
Week 13: San Francisco 49ers at Seattle Seahawks – Game summary

Quarter	1	2	3	4	Total
49ers	14	9	0	0	**23**
**Seahawks**	7	14	9	0	**30**

at Lumen Field, Seattle, Washington

- Date: December 5
- Game time: 1:25 p.m. PST
- Game weather: Sunny, 41 °F (5 °C)
- Game attendance: 68,758
- Referee: Alex Kemp
- TV announcers (CBS): Kevin Harlan, Tiki Barber and Melanie Collins
- Recap, Game Book

Game information

**First quarter**

- SEA – Travis Homer 73-yard run (Jason Myers kick), 13:11. Seahawks 7–0. **Drive: 4 plays, 77 yards, 1:49.**
- SF – George Kittle 24-yard pass from Jimmy Garoppolo (Robbie Gould kick), 10:27. Tied 7–7. **Drive: 1 play, 24 yards, 0:07.**
- SF – Elijah Mitchell 2-yard run (Robbie Gould kick), 1:32. 49ers 14–7. **Drive: 9 plays, 54 yards, 4:10.**

**Second quarter**

- SF – Robbie Gould 50-yard field goal, 9:43. 49ers 17–7. **Drive: 9 plays, 31 yards, 5:02.**
- SEA – Adrian Peterson 1-yard run (Jason Myers kick), 5:35. 49ers 17–14. **Drive: 9 plays, 63 yards, 4:08.**
- SF – George Kittle 48-yard pass from Jimmy Garoppolo (kick failed), 1:48. 49ers 23–14. **Drive: 7 plays, 75 yards, 3:47.**
- SEA – D'Wayne Eskridge 7-yard pass from Russell Wilson (Jason Myers kick), 0:12. 49ers 23–21. **Drive: 8 plays, 65 yards, 1:36.**

**Third quarter**

- SEA – Carlos Dunlap sacked Jimmy Garoppolo in end zone for a safety, 10:28. Tied 23–23.
- SEA – Tyler Lockett 12-yard pass from Russell Wilson (Jason Myers kick), 2:28. Seahawks 30–23. **Drive: 5 plays, 28 yards, 2:09.**

**Fourth quarter**

- No scoring plays.

**Best passers**

- SF – Jimmy Garoppolo – 20/30, 299 yards, 2 TD, 2 INT
- SEA – Russell Wilson – 30/37, 231 yards, 2 TD, INT

**Best rushers**

- SF – Elijah Mitchell – 22 rushes, 66 yards, TD
- SEA – Travis Homer – 3 rushes, 80 yards, TD

**Best receivers**

- SF – George Kittle – 9 receptions, 181 yards, 2 TD
- SEA – Tyler Lockett – 7 receptions, 68 yards, TD

==== Week 14: at Houston Texans ====
Week 14: Seattle Seahawks at Houston Texans – Game summary

Quarter	1	2	3	4	Total
**Seahawks**	10	6	3	14	**33**
Texans	7	6	0	0	**13**

at NRG Stadium, Houston, Texas

- Date: December 12
- Game time: 12:00 p.m. CST/10:00 a.m. PST
- Game weather: Clear, 55 °F (13 °C) (retractable roof open)
- Game attendance: 67,610
- Referee: Adrian Hill
- TV announcers (Fox): Chris Myers, Daryl Johnston and Jen Hale
- Recap, Game Book

Game information

**First quarter**

- HOU – Brevin Jordan 5-yard pass from Davis Mills (Kaʻimi Fairbairn kick), 11:02. Texans 7–0. **Drive: 7 plays, 75 yards, 3:58.**
- SEA – Jason Myers 38-yard field goal, 6:20. Texans 7–3. **Drive: 9 plays, 56 yards, 4:42.**
- SEA – Rashaad Penny 32-yard run (Jason Myers kick), 0:00. Seahawks 10–7. **Drive: 7 plays, 97 yards, 3:03.**

**Second quarter**

- HOU – Kaʻimi Fairbairn 21-yard field goal, 6:05. Tied 10–10. **Drive: 16 plays, 72 yards, 8:55.**
- SEA – Tyler Lockett 55-yard pass from Russell Wilson (kick failed), 0:52. Seahawks 16–10. **Drive: 1 play, 55 yards, 0:08.**
- HOU – Kaʻimi Fairbairn 61-yard field goal, 0:00. Seahawks 16–13. **Drive: 6 plays, 15 yards, 0:52.**

**Third quarter**

- SEA – Jason Myers 38-yard field goal, 4:32. Seahawks 19–13. **Drive: 9 plays, 60 yards, 4:59.**

**Fourth quarter**

- SEA – Gerald Everett 1-yard pass from Russell Wilson (Russell Wilson–Tyler Lockett pass), 7:28. Seahawks 27–13. **Drive: 10 plays, 67 yards, 4:10.**
- SEA – Rashaad Penny 47-yard run (kick failed), 5:26. Seahawks 33–13. **Drive: 2 plays, 50 yards, 0:50.**

**Top passers**

- SEA – Russell Wilson – 17/28, 260 yards, 2 TD
- HOU – Davis Mills – 33/49, 331 yards, TD

**Top rushers**

- SEA – Rashaad Penny – 16 rushes, 137 yards, 2 TD
- HOU – Rex Burkhead – 11 rushes, 40 yards

**Top receivers**

- SEA – Tyler Lockett – 5 receptions, 142 yards, TD
- HOY – Brandin Cooks – 8 receptions, 101 yards

==== Week 15: at Los Angeles Rams ====
Week 15: Seattle Seahawks at Los Angeles Rams – Game summary

Quarter	1	2	3	4	Total
Seahawks	0	3	7	0	**10**
**Rams**	3	0	7	10	**20**

at SoFi Stadium, Inglewood, California

- Date: December 21
- Game time: 4:00 p.m. PST
- Game weather: None (retractable roof closed)
- Game attendance: 71,565
- Referee: Shawn Hochuli
- TV announcers (Fox): Chris Myers, Brock Huard and Jen Hale
- Recap, Game Book

Game information

**First quarter**

- LAR – Matt Gay 55-yard field goal, 8:16. Rams 3–0. **Drive: 9 plays, 29 yards, 6:44.**

**Second quarter**

- SEA – Jason Myers 39-yard field goal, 0:10. Tied 3–3. **Drive: 7 plays, 47 yards, 1:46.**

**Third quarter**

- SEA – DeeJay Dallas 4-yard run (Jason Myers kick), 9:23. Seahawks 10–3. **Drive: 11 plays, 75 yards, 5:37.**
- LAR – Cooper Kupp 6-yard pass from Matthew Stafford (Matt Gay kick), 6:31. Tied 10–10. **Drive: 6 plays, 86 yards, 2:52.**

**Fourth quarter**

- LAR – Cooper Kupp 29-yard pass from Matthew Stafford (Matt Gay kick), 10:48. Rams 17–10. **Drive: 8 plays, 88 yards, 5:13.**
- LAR – Matt Gay 35-yard field goal, 1:51. Rams 20–10. **Drive: 5 plays, 18 yards, 1:30.**

**Top passers**

- SEA – Russell Wilson – 17/31, 156 yards, INT
- LAR – Matthew Stafford – 21/29, 244 yards, 2 TD, INT

**Top rushers**

- SEA – DeeJay Dallas – 8 rushes, 41 yards, TD
- LAR – Sony Michel – 18 rushes, 92 yards

**Top receivers**

- SEA – Gerald Everett – 4 receptions, 60 yards
- LAR – Cooper Kupp – 9 receptions, 136 yards, 2 TD

==== Week 16: vs. Chicago Bears ====
Week 16: Chicago Bears at Seattle Seahawks – Game summary

Quarter	1	2	3	4	Total
**Bears**	0	7	7	11	**25**
Seahawks	7	10	7	0	**24**

at Lumen Field, Seattle, Washington

- Date: December 26
- Game time: 1:05 p.m. PST
- Game weather: Snow, 25 °F (−4 °C)
- Game attendance: 68,492
- Referee: Carl Cheffers
- TV announcers (Fox): Aaron Goldsmith, Aqib Talib and Megan Olivi
- Recap, Game Book

Game information

**First quarter**

- SEA – DK Metcalf 41-yard pass from Russell Wilson (Jason Myers kick), 9:00. Seahawks 7–0. **Drive: 7 plays, 80 yards, 3:04.**

**Second quarter**

- CHI – David Montgomery 1-yard run (Cairo Santos kick), 10:15. Tied 7–7. **Drive: 5 plays, 15 yards, 3:25.**
- SEA – Rashaad Penny 3-yard run (Jason Myers kick), 4:47. Seahawks 14–7. **Drive: 12 plays, 74 yards, 5:28.**
- SEA – Jason Myers 36-yard field goal, 0:17. Seahawks 17–7. **Drive: 7 plays, 55 yards, 0:45.**

**Third quarter**

- CHI – Khalil Herbert 20-yard run (Cairo Santos kick), 5:30. Seahawks 17–14. **Drive: 10 plays, 82 yards, 5:27.**
- SEA – Gerald Everett 24-yard pass from Russell Wilson (Jason Myers kick), 3:32. Seahawks 24–14. **Drive: 4 plays, 61 yards, 1:58.**

**Fourth quarter**

- CHI – Cairo Santos 35-yard field goal, 10:42. Seahawks 24–17. **Drive: 13 plays, 58 yards, 7:50.**
- CHI – Jimmy Graham 15-yard pass from Nick Foles (Nick Foles–Damiere Byrd pass), 1:01. Bears 25–24. **Drive: 6 plays, 80 yards, 1:55.**

**Top passers**

- CHI – Nick Foles – 24/35, 250 yards, TD
- SEA – Russell Wilson – 16/27, 181 yards, 2 TD

**Top rushers**

- CHI – David Montgomery – 21 rushes, 45 yards, TD
- SEA – Rashaad Penny – 17 rushes, 135 yards, TD

**Top receivers**

- CHI – David Montgomery – 7 receptions, 61 yards
- SEA – Gerald Everett – 4 receptions, 68 yards, TD

With the loss, the Seahawks were eliminated from the playoff contention for the first time since 2017.

==== Week 17: vs. Detroit Lions ====
Week 17: Detroit Lions at Seattle Seahawks – Game summary

Quarter	1	2	3	4	Total
Lions	0	7	15	7	**29**
**Seahawks**	10	21	7	13	**51**

at Lumen Field, Seattle, Washington

- Date: January 2
- Game time: 1:25 p.m. PST
- Game weather: Rain, 39 °F (4 °C)
- Game attendance: 68,043
- Referee: Tony Corrente
- TV announcers (Fox): Gus Johnson, Aqib Talib, and Megan Olivi
- Recap, Game Book

Game information

**First quarter**

- SEA – Rashaad Penny 15-yard run (Jason Myers kick), 5:46. Seahawks 7–0. **Drive: 9 plays, 71 yards, 3:56.**
- SEA – Jason Myers 51-yard field goal, 1:00. Seahawks 10–0. **Drive: 7 plays, 41 yards, 3:09.**

**Second quarter**

- SEA – Rashaad Penny 6-yard run (Jason Myers kick), 14:07. Seahawks 17–0. **Drive: 2 plays, 64 yards, 0:42.**
- DET – Amon-Ra St. Brown 26-yard run (Riley Patterson kick), 11:08. Seahawks 17–7. **Drive: 5 plays, 45 yards, 2:59.**
- SEA – DK Metcalf 13-yard pass from Russell Wilson (Jason Myers kick), 5:59. Seahawks 24–7. **Drive: 11 plays, 69 yards, 5:09.**
- SEA – Tyler Lockett 1-yard pass from Russell Wilson (Jason Myers kick), 0:21. Seahawks 31–7. **Drive: 11 plays, 90 yards, 5:13.**

**Third quarter**

- SEA – DK Metcalf 13-yard pass from Russell Wilson (Jason Myers kick), 14:12. Seahawks 38–7. **Drive: 2 plays, 21 yards, 0:40.**
- DET – Amon-Ra St. Brown 7-yard pass from Tim Boyle (Tim Boyle–Amon-Ra St. Brown pass), 10:14. Seahawks 38–15. **Drive: 8 plays, 73 yards, 3:58.**
- DET – Taylor Decker 6-yard pass from Tim Boyle (Riley Patterson kick), 4:50. Seahawks 38–22. **Drive: 10 plays, 56 yards, 5:24.**

**Fourth quarter**

- SEA – DK Metcalf 1-yard pass from Russell Wilson (Jason Myers kick), 12:36. Seahawks 45–22. **Drive: 13 plays, 75 yards, 7:14.**
- DET – Jamaal Williams 1-yard run (Riley Patterson kick), 7:04. Seahawks 45–29. **Drive: 11 plays, 75 yards, 5:32.**
- SEA – Jason Myers 36-yard field goal, 5:29. Seahawks 48–29. **Drive: 5 plays, 22 yards, 1:35.**
- SEA – Jason Myers 42-yard field goal, 4:33. Seahawks 51–29. **Drive: 4 plays, −2 yards, 0:24.**

**Top passers**

- DET – Tim Boyle – 22/37, 262 yards, 2 TD, 3 INT
- SEA – Russell Wilson – 20/29, 236 yards, 4 TD

**Top rushers**

- DET – D'Andre Swift – 4 rushes, 32 yards
- SEA – Rashaad Penny – 26 rushes, 170 yards, 2 TD

**Top receivers**

- DET – Amon-Ra St. Brown – 8 receptions, 111 yards, TD
- SEA – Freddie Swain – 2 receptions, 66 yards

==== Week 18: at Arizona Cardinals ====
Week 18: Seattle Seahawks at Arizona Cardinals – Game summary

Quarter	1	2	3	4	Total
**Seahawks**	7	10	7	14	**38**
Cardinals	7	3	14	6	**30**

at State Farm Stadium, Glendale, Arizona

- Date: January 9
- Game time: 2:25 p.m. MST/1:25 p.m. PST
- Game weather: Sunny, 72 °F (22 °C) (retractable roof open)
- Game attendance: 63,858
- Referee: Shawn Smith
- TV announcers (Fox): Adam Amin, Mark Schlereth and Shannon Spake
- Recap, Game Book

Game information

**First quarter**

- ARI – Zach Allen 16-yard fumble return (Matt Prater kick), 14:48. Cardinals 7–0.
- SEA – Tyler Lockett 43-yard pass from Russell Wilson (Jason Myers kick), 12:26. Tied 7–7. **Drive: 5 plays, 75 yards, 2:22.**

**Second quarter**

- ARI – Matt Prater 41-yard field goal, 11:44. Cardinals 10–7. **Drive: 19 plays, 66 yards, 10:41.**
- SEA – Tyler Lockett 5-yard pass from Russell Wilson (Jason Myers kick), 7:41. Seahawks 14–10. **Drive: 10 plays, 75 yards, 4:03.**
- SEA – Jason Myers 38-yard field goal, 1:21. Seahawks 17–10 **Drive: 11 plays, 52 yards, 2:19.**

**Third quarter**

- ARI – James Conner 20-yard pass from Kyler Murray (Matt Prater kick), 11:02. Tied 17–17. **Drive: 6 plays, 77 yards, 3:58.**
- ARI – James Conner 1-yard run (Matt Prater kick), 9:25. Cardinals 24–17. **Drive: 2 plays, 1 yard, 0:37.**
- SEA – Freddie Swain 25-yard pass from Russell Wilson (Jason Myers kick), 1:57. Tied 24–24. **Drive: 5 plays, 72 yards, 2:38.**

**Fourth quarter**

- SEA – Russell Wilson 4-yard run (Jason Myers kick), 13:15. Seahawks 31–24. **Drive: 3 plays, 10 yards, 1:45.**
- ARI – Matt Prater 30-yard field goal, 6:14. Seahawks 31–27. **Drive: 14 plays, 67 yards, 7:01.**
- SEA – Rashaad Penny 62-yard run (Jason Myers kick), 4:34. Seahawks 38–27. **Drive: 3 plays, 75 yards, 1:40.**
- ARI – Matt Prater 36-yard field goal, 1:13. Seahawks 38–30. **Drive: 14 plays, 57 yards, 3:21.**

**Top passers**

- SEA – Russell Wilson – 15/26, 238 yards, 3 TD, INT
- ARI – Kyler Murray – 28/39, 240 yards, TD

**Top rushers**

- SEA – Rashaad Penny – 23 rushes, 190 yards, TD
- ARI – James Conner – 15 rushes, 52 yards, TD

**Top receivers**

- SEA – Tyler Lockett – 5 receptions, 98 yards, 2 TD
- ARI – Zach Ertz – 7 receptions, 84 yards

This game was Russell Wilson's last as a quarterback for the Seahawks before he was traded to the Denver Broncos the following offseason.

=== Standings ===
==== Division ====
NFC West
	W	L	T	PCT	DIV	CONF	PF	PA	STK
^{(4)} Los Angeles Rams	12	5	0	.706	3–3	8–4	460	372	L1
^{(5)} Arizona Cardinals	11	6	0	.647	4–2	7–5	449	366	L1
^{(6)} San Francisco 49ers	10	7	0	.588	2–4	7–5	427	365	W2
Seattle Seahawks	7	10	0	.412	3–3	4–8	395	366	W2

==== Conference ====
NFC
#	Team	Division	W	L	T	PCT	DIV	CONF	SOS	SOV	STK
**Division winners**
1 (Note: Green Bay finished ahead of Tampa Bay based on conference record (9–3 vs. 8–4), claiming the No. 1 seed.)	Green Bay Packers	North	13	4	0	.765	4–2	9–3	.479	.480	L1
2	Tampa Bay Buccaneers	South	13	4	0	.765	4–2	8–4	.467	.443	W3
3 (Note: Dallas claimed the No. 3 seed over LA Rams based on conference record (10–2 vs. 8–4).)	Dallas Cowboys	East	12	5	0	.706	6–0	10–2	.488	.431	W1
4	Los Angeles Rams	West	12	5	0	.706	3–3	8–4	.483	.409	L1
**Wild cards**
5	Arizona Cardinals	West	11	6	0	.647	4–2	7–5	.490	.492	L1
6	San Francisco 49ers	West	10	7	0	.588	2–4	7–5	.500	.438	W2
7 (Note: Philadelphia finished ahead of New Orleans based on head-to-head victory, claiming the 7th and final playoff spot.)	Philadelphia Eagles	East	9	8	0	.529	3–3	7–5	.469	.350	L1
**Did not qualify for the postseason**
8	New Orleans Saints	South	9	8	0	.529	4–2	7–5	.512	.516	W2
9	Minnesota Vikings	North	8	9	0	.471	4–2	6–6	.507	.434	W1
10 (Note: Washington finished ahead of Atlanta and Seattle based on head-to-head victories.)	Washington Football Team	East	7	10	0	.412	2–4	6–6	.529	.420	W1
11 (Note: Seattle finished ahead of Atlanta based on win percentage in common games (4–2 vs. 3–3 against: San Francisco, New Orleans, Jacksonville, Washington, and Detroit).)	Seattle Seahawks	West	7	10	0	.412	3–3	4–8	.519	.424	W2
12	Atlanta Falcons	South	7	10	0	.412	2–4	4–8	.472	.315	L2
13	Chicago Bears	North	6	11	0	.353	2–4	4–8	.524	.373	L1
14	Carolina Panthers	South	5	12	0	.294	2–4	3–9	.509	.412	L7
15	New York Giants	East	4	13	0	.235	1–5	3–9	.536	.485	L6
16	Detroit Lions	North	3	13	1	.206	2–4	3–9	.528	.627	W1
**Tiebreakers** (Note: When breaking ties for three or more teams under the NFL's rules, they are first broken within divisions, then comparing only the highest-ranked remaining team from each division.)
