= Burkley =

Burkley is a surname. Notable people with the surname include:

- Dennis Burkley (1945–2013), American actor
- George G. Burkley (1902–1991), American military officer
- Tony Burkley, American politician from Ohio
- William F. Burkley (died 2001), American politician from Maryland
