= Frank T. Benson =

American politician (died 1967)

Member of the Maryland House of Delegates from the Cecil County district
- In office 1920–1920 Serving with S. Ralph Andrews and Cecil Clyde Squier

Personal details
- Born: Frank Townley Benson Butler, Maryland, U.S.
- Died: December 1, 1967 (aged 94) Havre de Grace, Maryland, U.S.
- Party: Republican
- Spouse: Helen Stuart Hemmick (m. 1898; died 1964)
- Children: 1
- Occupation: Politician; accountant; stenographer

Frank Townley Benson (died December 1, 1967) was an American politician from Maryland. He served as a member of the Maryland House of Delegates, representing Cecil County in 1920.

== Early life ==
Frank Townley Benson was born in Butler, Maryland. He attended schools in Baltimore County.

== Career ==
In 1891, Benson worked as a stenographer with the Baltimore and Ohio Railroad. In 1894, he became a secretary with a quarry company in Port Deposit. He served in that role until 1923.

Benson was a Republican. He was a member of the Maryland House of Delegates, representing Cecil County, in 1920. In the 1920s, Benson was an executive secretary for U.S. Senator Joseph I. France.

Benson was chief of the income tax division of the Office of the Collector of Internal Revenue from 1923 to 1933. He then worked as a cost accountant with Black and Decker in Baltimore. He retired from Black and Decker in 1953. In 1954, he worked for the Baltimore Board of Election Supervisors. He remained working with them until his retirement in 1959.

== Personal life ==
Benson married Helen Stuart Hemmick on July 20, 1898. His wife died in 1964. They had one daughter, Mrs. Clarence I. Benson. As of 1898, Benson lived in Port Deposit. He lived in Baltimore from 1923 to 1961. In 1961, he moved to Perryville. He was a member of Govans Methodist Church.

Benson died on December 1, 1967, at the age of 94, at Citizens Nursing Home in Havre de Grace.
