= Albert D. Mackey =

American politician (died 1935)

Member of the Maryland House of Delegates from the Cecil County district
- In office 1922–1922 Serving with Perry A. Gibson and Cecil Clyde Squier

Personal details
- Born: Albert DeWitt Mackey
- Died: March 8, 1935 (aged 47) Elkton, Maryland, U.S.
- Resting place: Elkton Cemetery
- Party: Democratic
- Spouse: Dorothy Ross (m. 1922)
- Children: 1
- Education: Washington College; University of Maryland School of Law
- Occupation: Politician; lawyer

Albert DeWitt Mackey (died March 8, 1935) was an American politician and lawyer from Maryland. He served as a member of the Maryland House of Delegates, representing Cecil County in 1922.

== Early life ==
Albert DeWitt Mackey was born to James A. Mackey. His father was a farmer near Fair Hill, Maryland. He graduated from Elkton High School in 1905. He then graduated from Washington College. He studied law and graduated from the University of Maryland School of Law. He was admitted to the bar around 1910.

== Career ==
Mackey was a Democrat. He was a member of the Maryland House of Delegates, representing Cecil County, in 1922. In 1919, Mackey ran for the Democratic nomination for state's attorney of Cecil County, but was defeated by James F. Evans. In 1923, he ran again for the Democratic nomination for state's attorney, but was defeated by E. Kirk Brown.

In 1919, Mackey became counsel for the Elkton Banking and Trust Company. Mackey worked as counsel for the Cecil County Commissioners and as election supervisor.

Mackey was on the board of visitors of Washington College.

== Personal life ==
Mackey married Dorothy Ross, of Eccleston Hill, Montgomery County, on July 2, 1922. They had one daughter. He was a member of Trinity Protestant Episcopal Church in Elkton.

Mackey died following kidney trouble on March 8, 1935, at the age of 47, at Union Hospital in Elkton. He was buried at Elkton Cemetery.
