= James W. Hughes =

American politician and newspaperman (died 1955)

Member of the Maryland Senate from the Cecil County district
- In office 1943–1947
- Preceded by: Cecil Clyde Squier
- Succeeded by: Guy Johnson

Personal details
- Born: Washington, D.C., U.S.
- Died: November 8, 1955 (aged 57) Elkton, Maryland, U.S.
- Resting place: Gilpin Manor Cemetery
- Party: Republican
- Spouse: Gertrude Ruth Tyrrell (m. 1930)
- Education: United States College of Veterinary Surgeons (DVM); Washington College of Law
- Occupation: Politician; veterinarian; lawyer; newspaperman

James W. Hughes (died November 8, 1955) was an American politician, veterinarian, lawyer and newspaperman from Maryland. He served as a member of the Maryland Senate, representing Cecil County from 1943 to 1947.

== Early life ==
James W. Hughes was born in Washington, D.C. He graduated from the United States College of Veterinary Surgeons in 1918 with a Doctor of Veterinary Medicine. He graduated from the Washington College of Law in 1928.

== Career ==
Following graduation, Hughes opened a veterinary practice in Amendale, Prince George's County, Maryland. He was an instructor at Washington College's veterinary school. In 1929, Hughes moved to Elkton and opened law offices. He also served as a member of the University of Maryland extension staff in Cecil County.

Hughes was a Republican. Hughes was a member of the Maryland Senate, representing Cecil County, from 1943 to 1947. Hughes ran for re-election in 1946, but lost to Guy Johnson. In 1951, Hughes was appointed police magistrate by Governor Theodore McKeldin. Due to ill health, he resigned from the post in 1954.

Hughes was an editor and publisher of the Cecil Whig. In 1947, Hughes purchased the Cecil Whig and The Midland Journal. Hughes was a member of the board of the Seventh Day Adventist Hospital in Wytheville, Virginia, and president of the board of the Union Hospital. In 1944, he led a campaign to fund a new building at Union Hospital.

== Personal life ==
Hughes married Gertrude Ruth Tyrrell in 1930. Hughes was an elder of the Seventh Day Adventist Church for 30 years.

Hughes died on November 8, 1955, at the age of 57, at Union Hospital in Elkton. He was buried at Gilpin Manor Cemetery.
