= McKie =

McKie is a surname. Notable people with the surname include:

- Aaron McKie (born 1972), American basketball player
- Angus McKie, English illustrator
- BJ McKie (born 1977), American basketball player
- David McKie (born 1935), British journalist and historian
- Evan McKie (born 1983), Canadian ballet dancer
- Helen McKie (1889–1957), British artist and illustrator
- James McKie (born 1870s), Scottish footballer
- Jason McKie (born 1980), American football player
- Phyllis McKie (died 1983), Canadian historian and photographer
- Rod McKie, British cartoonist
- Ronald McKie (1909–1991), Australian novelist
- Roy McKie, American illustrator
- Shirley McKie, Scottish police officer
- William McKie (1901–1984), Australian organist, conductor and composer
- William McKie (1886–1956), British wrestler

== See also ==
- Mackie (surname)
- Mickey (disambiguation)
