= J. Gifford Scarborough =

American politician and lawyer (died 1969)

Member of the Maryland House of Delegates from the Cecil County district
- In office 1947–1950 Serving with George Benson and Merton S. Jackson

Personal details
- Born: Joseph Gifford Scarborough Pleasant Hills, Maryland, U.S.
- Died: February 20, 1969 (aged 57) Perry Point, Maryland, U.S.
- Resting place: Friends Cemetery; Calvert, Maryland, U.S.
- Party: Democratic
- Spouse: Mary R. Brown (m. 1937)
- Children: 3
- Education: Dickinson College; University of Maryland School of Law
- Occupation: Politician; lawyer

Joseph Gifford Scarborough (died February 20, 1969) was an American politician and lawyer from Maryland. He served as a member of the Maryland House of Delegates, representing Cecil County from 1947 to 1950.

== Early life ==
Joseph Gifford Scarborough was born in Pleasant Hills, Maryland, to Nellie Y. and J. Leedom Scarborough. He graduated from West Nottingham Academy. He also graduated from Dickinson College and the University of Maryland School of Law. He was a member of Phi Kappa Psi. He was admitted to the bar.

== Career ==
Scarborough was a captain with the United States Army during World War II. He worked in the military intelligence service overseas. He worked as a lawyer in Elkton from 1947 until his retirement in 1966 due to illness.

Scarborough was a Democrat. He served as a member of the Maryland House of Delegates, representing Cecil County from 1947 to 1950.

== Personal life ==
Scarborough married Mary R. Brown, daughter of E. Kirk Brown, in 1937. They had two sons and a daughter, J. Gifford Jr., John Leedom and Miriam.

Scarborough died on February 20, 1969, at the age of 57, at the Veterans Affairs hospital in Perry Point. He was buried at Friends Cemetery in Calvert.
