= Stone Forsythe =

American football player (born 1997)

No. 73 – Carolina Panthers
- Position: Offensive tackle
- Roster status: Active

Personal information
- Born: December 29, 1997 (age 28); Winter Garden, Florida, U.S.
- Listed height: 6 ft 8 in (2.03 m)
- Listed weight: 315 lb (143 kg)

Career information
- High school: West Orange (Winter Garden)
- College: Florida (2016–2020)
- NFL draft: 2021: 6th round, 208th overall pick

Career history
- Seattle Seahawks (2021–2024); New York Giants (2025)*; Las Vegas Raiders (2025); Carolina Panthers (2026–present)
- * Offseason or practice squad member only

Career NFL statistics as of 2025
- Games played: 70
- Games started: 27
- Stats at Pro Football Reference

Stone Forsythe (born December 29, 1997) is an American professional football offensive tackle for the Carolina Panthers of the National Football League (NFL). He played college football for the Florida Gators.

== Early life ==
Forsythe was born and grew up in Winter Garden, Florida, and attended West Orange High School. He committed to play college football at Florida over offers from Kentucky and Duke.

== College career ==
Forsythe redshirted his true freshman season. He saw his first playing time when he started the final two games of his redshirt freshman season. Forsythe played in all 13 of Florida's games with one start as a redshirt sophomore. He became a starter going into his redshirt junior season and started the final 25 games of his career. Forsythe appeared in 40 games with 28 starts over the course of his collegiate career.

== Professional career ==
Pre-draft measurables
Height	Weight	Arm length	Hand span	Wingspan	40-yard dash	10-yard split	20-yard split	20-yard shuttle	Three-cone drill	Vertical jump	Broad jump	Bench press
6 ft 8 in (2.03 m)	307 lb (139 kg)	34 3/8 in (0.87 m)	10 in (0.25 m)	6 ft 11 1/4 in (2.11 m)	5.13 s	1.82 s	2.96 s	4.63 s	7.47 s	27.5 in (0.70 m)	8 ft 7 in (2.62 m)	25 reps
All values from Pro Day

=== Seattle Seahawks ===
Forsythe was selected by the Seattle Seahawks in the sixth round, 208th overall, of the 2021 NFL draft. On May 14, 2021, Forsythe signed his four-year rookie contract with Seattle worth over $3.6 million and a signing bonus of $166,000.

=== New York Giants ===
On March 13, 2025, Forsythe signed with the New York Giants. He was released on August 26 as part of final roster cuts.

=== Las Vegas Raiders ===
On August 27, 2025, Forsythe signed with the Las Vegas Raiders.

=== Carolina Panthers ===
On March 10, 2026, Forsythe signed a one-year contract with the Carolina Panthers.

== NFL career statistics ==
Legend
**Bold**	Career high

=== Regular season ===
Year	Team	Games		Tackles					Interceptions						Fumbles				
Year	Team	GP	GS	Cmb	Solo	Ast	Sck	TFL	Int	Yds	Avg	Lng	TD	PD	FF	Fum	FR	Yds	TD
2021	SEA	10	0	0	0	0	0.0	0	0	0	0.0	0	0	0	0	0	0	0	0
2022	SEA	**17**	1	0	0	0	0.0	0	0	0	0.0	0	0	0	0	0	0	0	0
2023	SEA	**17**	8	0	0	0	0.0	0	0	0	0.0	0	0	0	0	0	0	0	0
2024	SEA	9	5	0	0	0	0.0	0	0	0	0.0	0	0	0	0	0	0	0	0
2025	LV	**17**	**13**	0	0	0	0.0	0	0	0	0.0	0	0	0	0	0	**1**	0	0
Career		70	27	0	0	0	0.0	0	0	0	0.0	0	0	0	0	0	1	0	0

=== Postseason ===
Year	Team	Games		Tackles					Interceptions						Fumbles				
Year	Team	GP	GS	Cmb	Solo	Ast	Sck	TFL	Int	Yds	Avg	Lng	TD	PD	FF	Fum	FR	Yds	TD
2022	SEA	1	0	0	0	0	0.0	0	0	0	0.0	0	0	0	0	0	0	0	0
Career		1	0	0	0	0	0.0	0	0	0	0.0	0	0	0	0	0	0	0	0

== Personal life ==
Forsythe's father, Ray Forsythe, played college football at Kent State and UCF and professionally for the Cincinnati Bengals, Amsterdam Admirals, and Orlando Predators.
