= Elkton High School (Maryland) =

Coordinates: 39.6227°N 75.8354°W

Location
- 110 James Street; Elkton, Maryland 21921; United States

Information
- Type: Public Secondary
- Motto: Home of the Golden Elks
- Established: 1958
- School district: Cecil County Public Schools
- Principal: James Leitgeb
- Teaching staff: 73 FTE (2018–19)
- Grades: 9–12
- Enrollment: 983 (2018–19)
- Campus: Rural
- Colors: Purple and gold
- Athletics: Football, Basketball, Lacrosse, Soccer, Baseball, Softball
- Mascot: Golden Elks
- Website: www.ccps.org/Elkton

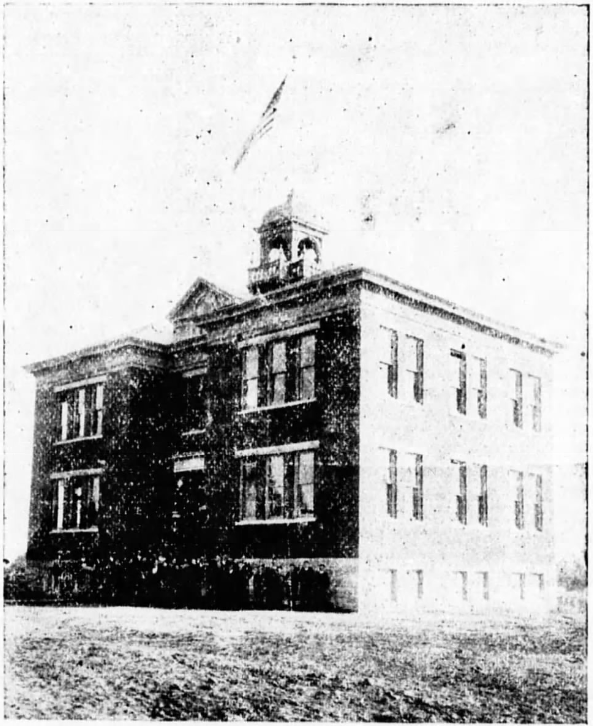
Elkton High School in 1906

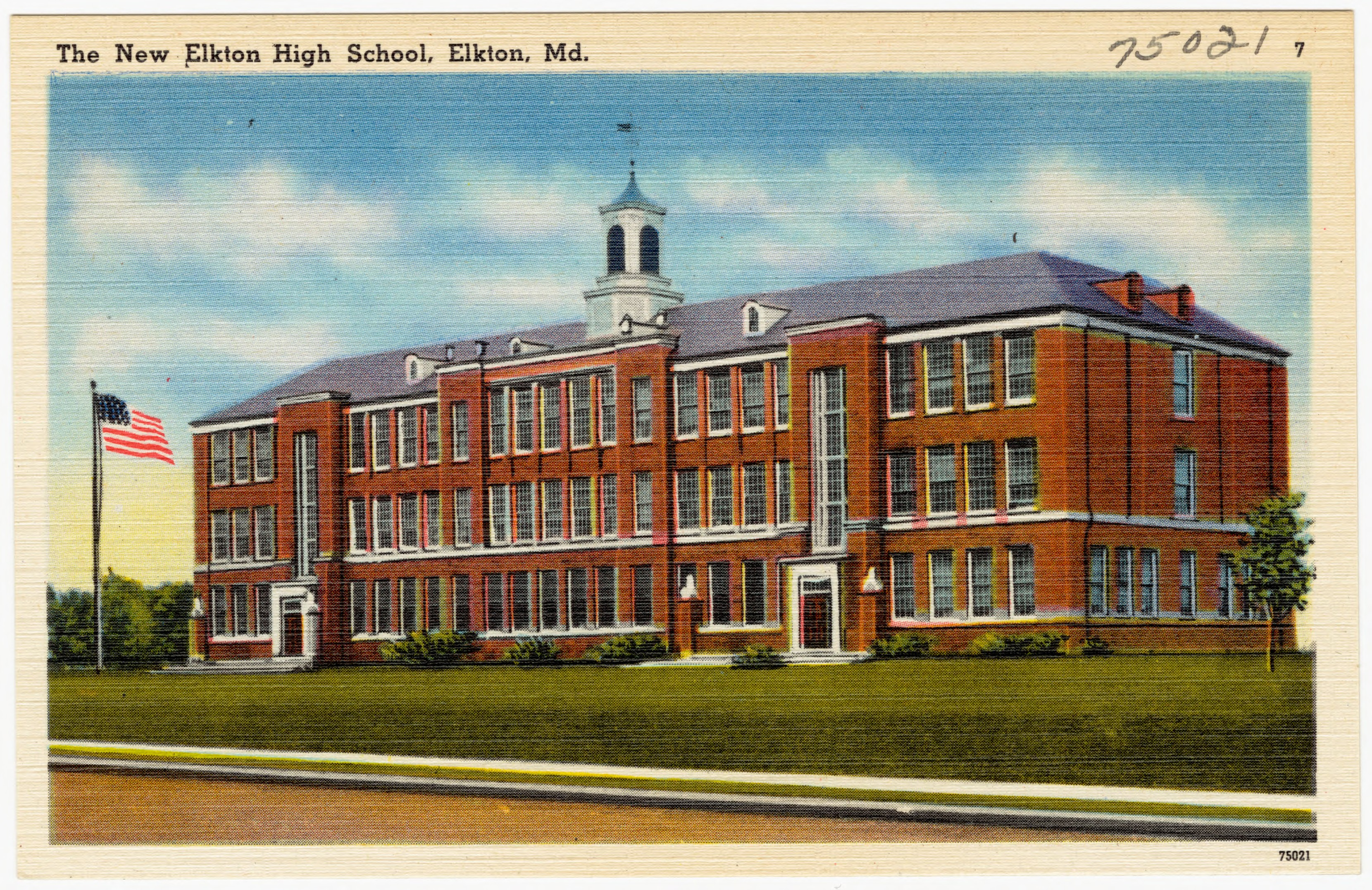
Elkton High School c. the 1930s

Elkton High School is a high school located in Elkton, Maryland, United States on 110 James St. It is a member of the Cecil County Public Schools and there are approximately ~1000 students. Ranked as the 127th school within Maryland by U.S. News, the school is considered to be the 4th-ranked high school within the Cecil County Public School district.

== Student demographics ==
The student body of Elkton High school is composed of approximately ~1000 students, with 2019 data showing an enrollment of 983 students, slightly less than the historical high of 1067 in 2015. The student body at Elkton High is diverse, seeing a proportional percentage of students from different ethnic groups as well as genders.

The graduation rate of students enrolled at Elkton High School has been consistently above 80% in the past 5 years, as measured by 4-year adjusted cohorts. As of 2019, the graduation rate of students at Elkton High School is 92.9% (223 out of 240 students).

== Media coverage ==
In 2019, Elkton High school attracted positive media-coverage as Staci Lamb, a 9th-grade English teacher decorated her classroom into a Harry-Potter themed 'castle.' First popularized on social media, the event was covered by both local and international news media. As a winner of the 2018 Cecil County Public Schools Teacher of the Year and finalist for Maryland's Teacher of the Year, Staci Lamb decorated her classroom using her own funds.

== Notable alumni ==
- William Wilson Bratton (1913–1984), lawyer and member of the Maryland House of Delegates
- William F. Burkley (died 2001), member of the Maryland House of Delegates
- Albert D. Mackey (died 1935), member of the Maryland House of Delegates
- John O'Donoghue, American professional baseball pitcher
- Bernard Purdie, drummer and an influential R&B, soul and funk musician
- Niles Scott, National Football League player
- Larry Webster, former National Football League player
