= Lawson C. Tosh =

American politician (born 1879)

Member of the Maryland House of Delegates from the Cecil County district
- In office 1943–1946 Serving with Joseph B. Bryson and Josephine A. Mackie

Personal details
- Born: January 13, 1879
- Died: March 24, 1954
- Party: Democratic
- Spouse: Leora Crothers (died 1929)
- Children: 2
- Occupation: Politician; businessman

Lawson C. Tosh (January 13, 1879 – March 24, 1954) was an American politician from Maryland. He served as a member of the Maryland House of Delegates, representing Cecil County from 1943 to 1946.

== Early life ==
Lawson C. Tosh was born on January 13, 1879, to India Matilda (née Craig) and John C. Tosh.

== Career ==
In 1921, Tosh and David T. Reed purchased Brown and Shallcross, a meat business on Pearl Street in Rising Sun. He operated the business until 1936. At one point, it was known as Tosh & Tosh.

Tosh was a Democrat. In 1923, Tosh ran for the Democratic nomination for sheriff of Cecil County. In 1933, Tosh was recommended as postmaster of Rising Sun. In 1934, he was elected as county commissioner of district 3 of Cecil County, defeating Cecil Kirk. In 1937, Tosh was elected president of the Eastern Shore County Commissioners Association. Tosh served as a member of the Maryland House of Delegates, representing Cecil County from 1943 to 1946.

== Personal life ==
Tosh married Leora Crothers, daughter of Granville Crothers. They had one son and one daughter, John L. and Martha. She died in 1929. He lived in Rising Sun.
