= Douglas W. Connellee =

American politician (died 1984)

Member of the Maryland House of Delegates from the Cecil County district
- In office 1965–1966 Serving with Nancy Brown Burkheimer and Frank H. Harris
- Preceded by: Guy Johnson

Personal details
- Born: Douglas William Connellee near Reisterstown, Maryland, U.S.
- Died: November 27, 1984 (aged 71) Elkton, Maryland, U.S.
- Resting place: Gilpin Manor Memorial Park; Elkton, Maryland, U.S.
- Party: Democratic
- Spouse(s): Mildred Garey Smith (m. 1939; died 1962) Margot Albinson Sprecher
- Children: 3
- Education: Baltimore City College, University of Baltimore
- Occupation: Politician; real estate businessman

Douglas William Connellee (died November 27, 1984) was an American politician and real estate businessman from Maryland. He served as a member of the Maryland House of Delegates, representing Cecil County from 1965 to 1966.

== Early life ==
Douglas William Connellee was born near Reisterstown, Maryland, and was raised in Aberdeen. He graduated from Charlotte Hall Military Academy and attended Baltimore City College and the University of Baltimore.

== Career ==
Connellee was a Democrat. He served on the Elkton Town Council from 1958 to 1965. He was appointed as a member of the Maryland House of Delegates, representing Cecil County, replacing Guy Johnson. He ran for election in 1966, but lost.

Connellee was the owner of Kentmere Realty Inc. in Elkton, and CBC Realty and Fairwinds Realty in Chestertown. Connellee retired from Kentmere Realty in 1982, but was still, at the time of his death, working as a broker. He owned and operated Elk Theater in Elkton. He served as president of the Maryland Theater Owners group. He also served as president of the Cecil County Board of Realtors and the Kent County Realtors' Board.

== Personal life ==
Connellee married Mildred Garey Smith on November 25, 1939. She died in 1962. He married Margot Albinson Sprecher. He had a son and two daughters, Richard D., Ann and Susan. He had a stepson and stepdaughter, Milford H. Sprecher and Melissa Sprecher. He was a member of Trinity Episcopal Church. He lived in Elkton.

Connellee died of heart failure on November 27, 1984, aged 71, at Union Hospital in Elkton. He was buried at Gilpin Manor Memorial Park in Elkton.
