= J. Albert Roney Jr. =

American politician and judge (died 1979)

Member of the Maryland Senate from the Cecil County district
- In office 1963–1967
- Preceded by: Guy Johnson
- Succeeded by: district changed

Personal details
- Died: May 12, 1979 (aged 65) Elkton, Maryland, U.S.
- Resting place: North East Methodist Cemetery; North East, Maryland, U.S.
- Party: Democratic
- Spouse: Nancy Davis Smith
- Children: 2
- Education: University of Maryland School of Law
- Occupation: Politician; lawyer; judge

J. Albert Roney Jr. (died May 12, 1979) was an American politician and judge from Maryland. He served as a member of the Maryland Senate, representing Cecil County from 1963 to 1967.

== Early life ==
J. Albert Roney Jr. graduated from the University of Maryland School of Law. He was admitted to the bar in 1936.

== Career ==
Roney worked with Henry A. Warburton in Elkton, Maryland. In 1938, he took over the law practice of Harold E. Cobourn. In 1938, Roney ran for the Democratic nomination for the Maryland House of Delegates, but lost.

J. Albert Roney Jr. served as state's attorney for Cecil County from 1951 to 1962. He served as a Democratic member of the Maryland Senate, representing Cecil County, from 1963 to 1967. He was defeated in the 1966 election.

Roney was appointed as assistant judge of the circuit court on December 18, 1969. He was elected as judge of the circuit court from the second judicial circuit in 1972. He served in that role until his death.

He was a director of Union Hospital.

== Personal life ==
Roney married Nancy Davis Smith. They had a son and daughter, James A. III and Sayre.

Roney died on May 12, 1979, at the age of 65, in Union Hospital in Elkton. He was buried at North East Methodist Cemetery in North East, Maryland.
