= Frank L. Rowland =

American politician (1891–1949)

Member of the Maryland House of Delegates from the Cecil County district
- In office 1939–1941 Serving with Polk S. Howard, Luther P. Jefferson, Josephine A. Mackie

Personal details
- Born: Frank Latimer Rowland; 1891 near Port Deposit, Maryland, U.S.
- Died: June 2, 1949 (aged 57–58) Havre de Grace, Maryland, U.S.
- Resting place: West Nottingham Cemetery
- Party: Democratic
- Spouse: Marguerite Boulden (m. 1915)
- Children: 1
- Occupation: Politician; farmer

Frank Latimer Rowland (1891 – June 2, 1949) was an American politician from Maryland. He served as a member of the Maryland House of Delegates, representing Cecil County from 1939 to 1941.

== Early life ==
Frank Latimer Rowland was born in 1891 near Port Deposit, Maryland, to Alice (née Ball) and Edwin H. Rowland.

== Career ==
Rowland was a Democrat. He served as a member of the Maryland House of Delegates, representing Cecil County from 1939 to 1941. He was elected to three consecutive terms as member of the board of commissioners of Cecil County. He served in that role until his death.

Rowland worked as a farmer in Perryville.

== Personal life ==
Rowland married Marguerite Boulden on August 4, 1915. They had one son, Wallace M. Rowland was a member and president of the board of trustees of Port Deposit Presbyterian Church.

Rowland died on June 2, 1949, at Harford Memorial Hospital in Havre de Grace. He was buried at West Nottingham Cemetery.
