= Greg Carr (gridiron football) =

American gridiron football player (born 1985)

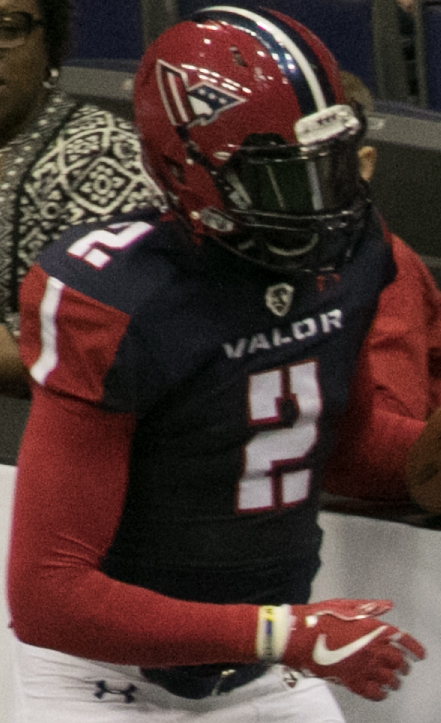
- Carr with the Washington Valor in 2017

No. 4, 2
- Position: Wide receiver

Personal information
- Born: October 8, 1985 (age 41); Citra, Florida, U.S.
- Listed height: 6 ft 6 in (1.98 m)
- Listed weight: 217 lb (98 kg)

Career information
- High school: North Marion (FL)
- College: Florida State
- NFL draft: 2009: undrafted

Career history
- San Diego Chargers (2009)*; Winnipeg Blue Bombers (2010–2011); Edmonton Eskimos (2012); Saskatchewan Roughriders (2012–2013); Calgary Stampeders (2013); Orlando Predators (2014–2016); Washington Valor (2017); Albany Empire (2018); Atlantic City Blackjacks (2019)
- * Offseason or practice squad member only

Awards and highlights
- Second-team All-Arena (2014); AFL Rookie of the Year (2014); Third-team Freshman All-American (2005); 2× Second-team All-ACC (2005, 2006)

Career CFL statistics
- Receptions: 117
- Receiving yards: 1,664
- Receiving TDs: 11
- Stats at CFL.ca (archived)

Career AFL statistics
- Receptions: 311
- Receiving yards: 3,916
- Receiving TDs: 89
- Stats at ArenaFan.com

Greg Carr (born October 8, 1985) is an American former professional football wide receiver. After playing college football at Florida State, Carr was signed by the San Diego Chargers as an undrafted free agent in 2009. Carr was also a member of the Winnipeg Blue Bombers, Edmonton Eskimos, Saskatchewan Roughriders, Calgary Stampeders, Orlando Predators, Washington Valor, Albany Empire, and Atlantic City Blackjacks. In June 2020, Carr was hired as the head football coach at North Marion High School in Citra, Florida.

== Early life ==
Carr played high school football at North Marion High School in Citra, Florida. He earned first-team all-state honors in Class 3A as a junior and senior. He was also a star basketball player, earning first-team honors during his senior year.

== College career ==
During Carr's freshman year he led all Florida State receivers in yards per reception with 20.6 and receiving touchdowns with nine. He also tied former Virginia Cavaliers and current Pittsburgh Steelers tight end Heath Miller's ACC record for receiving touchdowns by a freshman. His great season earned him second-team All-ACC and third-team freshman All-American. During his sophomore year, he made 34 receptions for 619 yards and 12 touchdowns, helping him earn a second-team All-ACC selection. During his junior campaign he made 45 receptions for 795 and four touchdowns. As a senior Carr made 39 receptions for 542 yards and four touchdowns.

Carr finished his career at Florida State ranking fifth in the school's history in career receptions and receiving yards with 148 receptions for 2,574 yards, and second in touchdowns with 29.

== Professional career ==
=== San Diego Chargers ===
He was not drafted in the 2009 NFL draft and signed with the San Diego Chargers after the draft. The Chargers waived Carr on August 31.

=== Winnipeg Blue Bombers ===
Greg Carr was added to the Winnipeg Blue Bombers Practice Roster September 1, 2010. He was activated for the game against the Montreal Alouettes on September 25. His first catch in the CFL was a 74-yard touchdown, his second catch was a 71-yard touchdown. Carr left the game in the third quarter with a leg injury but had caught 4 passes for 185 yards and 2 touchdowns.

=== Edmonton Eskimos ===
After becoming a free agent, Carr signed with the Edmonton Eskimos on February 16, 2012.

=== Saskatchewan Roughriders ===
On September 5, 2012, Carr was traded along with a fifth round draft pick in the 2013 CFL draft to the Saskatchewan Roughriders for the playing rights to Matthew O'Donnell and a fourth round draft pick in the 2013 CFL Draft. Carr had 2 touchdown receptions in the Western Divisional Semi-Final against the Stampeders on November 11, 2012, including what looked like it would be the game-winner with only 53 seconds left. After playing in the 2013 CFL season opener, the Roughriders released Carr.

=== Calgary Stampeders ===
Carr was signed by the Stampeders on July 8, 2013, but after playing in only four games, he was released on September 9, 2013.

=== Washington Valor ===
On October 14, 2016, Carr was assigned to the Washington Valor during the dispersal draft.

=== Albany Empire ===
On March 21, 2018, Carr was assigned to the Albany Empire.

=== Atlantic City Blackjacks ===
Carr was assigned to the Atlantic City Blackjacks on July 4, 2019.
