= Luther P. Jefferson =

American politician (died 1941)

Member of the Maryland House of Delegates from the Cecil County district
- In office 1939–1941 Serving with Polk S. Howard and Frank L. Rowland
- Succeeded by: Josephine A. Mackie

Personal details
- Died: August 8, 1941 (aged 35) Baltimore, Maryland, U.S.
- Resting place: Bethel Cemetery
- Party: Democratic
- Occupation: Politician; farmer

Luther P. Jefferson (died August 8, 1941) was an American politician from Maryland. He served as a member of the Maryland House of Delegates, representing Cecil County from 1939 to his death in 1941.

== Early life ==
Luther P. Jefferson was born to James Joseph Jefferson.

== Career ==
Jefferson was a Democrat. He served as a member of the Maryland House of Delegates, representing Cecil County from 1939 to his death.

Jefferson was a farmer, livestock dealer and auctioneer.

== Personal life ==
Jefferson was married. He lived near Elkton. Jefferson died of spinal meningitis on August 8, 1941, at the age of 35, at Union Memorial Hospital in Baltimore. He was buried at Bethel Cemetery.
