= Guy Johnson (politician) =

American politician and educator (died 1965)

Member of the Maryland House of Delegates from the Cecil County district
- In office 1963 – August 19, 1965 Serving with Nancy A. Brown, Frank H. Harris, Nancy Brown Burkheimer
- Succeeded by: Douglas W. Connellee
- In office 1951–1957 Serving with George Benson, William Wilson Bratton, F. Reynolds Mackie, William F. Burkley
- Succeeded by: Ralph W. McCool

Member of the Maryland Senate from the Cecil County district
- In office 1957–1962
- Preceded by: James Weinroth
- Succeeded by: J. Albert Roney Jr.
- In office 1947–1951
- Preceded by: James W. Hughes
- Succeeded by: Omar D. Crothers Jr.

Personal details
- Born: Elkton, Maryland, U.S.
- Died: August 19, 1965 (aged 87) Elkton, Maryland, U.S.
- Resting place: Elkton Cemetery; Elkton, Maryland, U.S.
- Party: Democratic
- Spouse: Ethel Vinyard (m. 1912; died 1929)
- Children: 1
- Education: Johns Hopkins University; University of Delaware
- Occupation: Politician; educator

Guy Johnson (died August 19, 1965) was an American politician and educator from Maryland. He represented Cecil County in the Maryland Senate from 1947 to 1951 and from 1957 to 1963 and in the Maryland House of Delegates from 1951 to 1957 and from 1963 to 1965.

== Early life ==
Guy Johnson was born in Elkton, Maryland. He graduated from Elkton Academy. He studied at Johns Hopkins University and the University of Delaware.

== Career ==
In 1897, Johnson began his teaching career as a teacher at the Warwick Elementary School in Cecil County. He served as the principal of schools in North East, Chesapeake and Elkton. He worked as an educator for 49 years.

Johnson was a Democrat. Johnson served as a member of the Maryland Senate, representing Cecil County, from 1947 to 1951. He was the chairman of the education committee in 1951. Johnson served as a member of the Maryland House of Delegates from 1951 to 1957. In 1957, he was re-appointed to fill a vacancy in the Maryland Senate. He left the senate in 1963. He then served again in the Maryland House of Delegates from 1963 until his death.

== Personal life ==
Johnson married Ethel Vinyard, daughter of Verna Vinyard, of Warwick, Maryland, on December 31, 1912. She died in 1929. They had one daughter, Sarah J. He was a member of the Elkton Methodist Church.

Johnson died on August 19, 1965, at the age of 87, at his home in Elkton. He was buried at Elkton Cemetery.

== Awards and legacy ==
Johnson was honored as Elkton's Citizen of the Year in 1964.
