= Merton S. Jackson =

American politician (died 1985)

Member of the Maryland House of Delegates from the Cecil County district
- In office 1947–1950 Serving with George Benson and J. Gifford Scarborough

Personal details
- Died: June 26, 1985
- Resting place: Hopewell Cemetery
- Party: Republican
- Spouse: Georgia M. Manlove (m. 1940)
- Occupation: Politician

Merton S. Jackson (died June 26, 1985) was an American politician from Maryland. He served as a member of the Maryland House of Delegates, representing Cecil County from 1947 to 1950.

== Biography ==
Jackson was a Republican. He served as a member of the Maryland House of Delegates, representing Cecil County from 1947 to 1950.

Jackson was a member of the McCloskey and Jackson firm in Elkton.

Jackson married Georgia M. Manlove on March 23, 1940. Jackson lived in Perryville. He died on June 26, 1985. He was buried at Hopewell Cemetery.
