= Richard D. Mackie =

American politician

Member of the Maryland House of Delegates from the 34th district
- In office 1975–1982 Serving with Carter M. Hickman and R. Clayton Mitchell Jr.
- Preceded by: district started
- Succeeded by: district ended

Member of the Maryland House of Delegates from the Cecil County district
- In office 1967–1974 Serving with Nancy Brown Burkheimer and Edgar U. Startt
- Succeeded by: district ended
- In office 1959–1962 Serving with William F. Burkley and Frank H. Harris

Personal details
- Born: Richard Delbert Mackie; December 30, 1922 Warwick, Maryland, U.S.
- Died: October 27, 2013 (aged 90)
- Resting place: Sharps Cemetery; Fair Hill, Maryland, U.S.
- Party: Democratic
- Parent: Josephine A. Mackie (mother)
- Education: University of Delaware
- Occupation: Politician; farmer

Richard D. "Tucker" Mackie (December 30, 1922 – October 27, 2013) was an American politician and farmer from Maryland. He served as a member of the Maryland House of Delegates, representing Cecil County, from 1959 to 1962 and from 1967 to 1974. He then represented the 34th district in the House of Delegates from 1972 to 1982.

== Early life ==
Richard Delbert Mackie was born on December 30, 1922, in Warwick, Maryland, to Josephine (née Aiken) and Osborne Sentman Mackie. He graduated from West Nottingham Academy and the University of Delaware.

== Career ==
Mackie worked as a farmer.

Mackie was a Democrat. He served as a member of the Maryland House of Delegates, representing Cecil County, from 1959 to 1962 and from 1967 to 1974. He then represented the 34th district in the House of Delegates from 1975 to 1982. In 1986, he ran for the Cecil County commission, but lost to Merritt Dean.

Mackie was a founding member of the Democratic Club of Cecil County. He was a member of the Sons of the American Revolution and the Cecil County Health Planning Committee. He was a charter member of the National Society for the Prevention of Blindness and was a campaign chair for the March of Dimes. He served on the Susquehanna State Park Advisory Board from 1983 to 1984 and from 1987 to 1990. He helped the Natural Resource Management Area purchase the duPont property in Fair Hill, Maryland.

== Personal life ==
Mackie went by the nickname Tucker. He died on October 27, 2013. He was buried at Sharps Cemetery in Fair Hill.
