= George Benson (Maryland politician) =

American politician (died 1953)

Member of the Maryland House of Delegates from the Cecil County district
- In office 1947 – February 21, 1953 Serving with Merton S. Jackson, J. Gifford Scarborough, William Wilson Bratton, Guy Johnson
- Succeeded by: F. Reynolds Mackie

Personal details
- Born: George Benson III near Chesapeake City, Maryland, U.S.
- Died: February 21, 1953 (aged 76) Annapolis, Maryland, U.S.
- Resting place: Bethel Cemetery
- Party: Democratic

George Benson III (died February 21, 1953) was an American politician from Maryland. He served as a member of the Maryland House of Delegates, representing Cecil County, from 1947 to his death in 1953.

== Biography ==
George Benson III was born near Chesapeake City, Maryland.

Benson was a Democrat. He served as a member of the Maryland House of Delegates, representing Cecil County, from 1947 to his death.

Benson was married. He died following a heart attack on February 21, 1953, at the age of 76, in Annapolis. He was buried at Bethel Cemetery.
