= North Marion High School (Florida) =

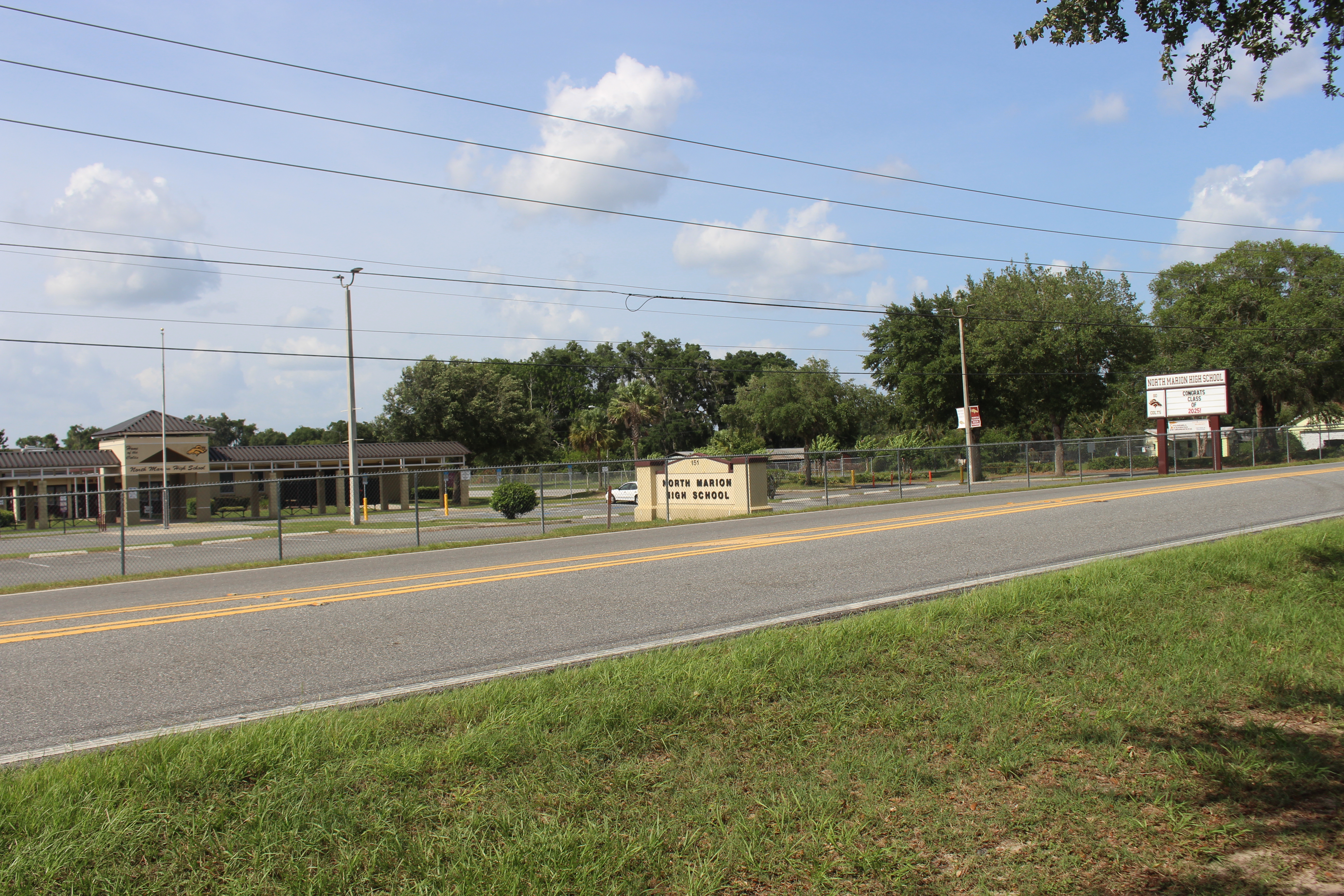
- School sign

Location
- 151 West Hwy 329; Citra, Florida; United States; 29°20′22″N 82°08′18″W

Information
- Type: Public secondary and magnet school
- Established: 1964; 62 years ago
- School district: Marion County Public Schools
- Oversight: Cambridge Assessment International Education
- Principal: James “Matt” Johnson
- Teaching staff: 63.00 (FTE)
- Grades: 9–12
- Enrollment: 1,259 (2023–2024)
- Student to teacher ratio: 19.98
- Colors: Garnet and Gold
- Mascot: Colts
- Accreditation: Florida Department of Education
- Website: www.marionschools.net/nmh

North Marion High School is a public high school and magnet school located in Citra, Florida. The school's athletic teams are known as the Colts and the varsity football team competes in the FHSAA Class 5A Division. The school colors are garnet and gold. The school currently serves 1,313 students in grades 9 through 12 (2018–19).

== State championships ==
North Marion won its first ever and only state championship, winning the 2023 FHSAA 4A State Championship in Varsity Baseball. They defeated Nature Coast, Hernando, Bishop Moore, Sunset, and Bishop Kenny to claim the title 5–0 in Ft. Myers. They secured an overall record of 27–5.

== Notable alumni ==
- Cortez Allen - collegiate/professional football player
- Greg Carr - collegiate/professional football player
- Rielle Hunter - filmmaker, had an affair with and conceived a child with 2004 Democratic Party vice-presidential nominee John Edwards.
- Jeremy McKinnon - musician
- Freddie Swain - collegiate/professional football player
