= William Wilson Bratton =

American politician and lawyer (1913–1984)

Member of the Maryland House of Delegates from the Cecil County district
- In office 1951–1954 Serving with George Benson, Guy Johnson, F. Reynolds Mackie
- Succeeded by: William F. Burkley

Personal details
- Born: 1913 Elkton, Maryland, U.S.
- Died: February 17, 1984 (aged 70–71) Elkton, Maryland, U.S.
- Resting place: West Nottingham Presbyterian Cemetery
- Party: Democratic
- Children: 3
- Education: Western Maryland College; University of Maryland School of Law
- Occupation: Politician; lawyer

William Wilson Bratton (1913 – February 17, 1984) was an American politician and lawyer from Maryland. He served as a member of the Maryland House of Delegates, representing Cecil County from 1951 to 1954.

== Early life ==
William Wilson Bratton was born in 1913 in Elkton, Maryland. He graduated from Elkton High School in 1931. He graduated from Western Maryland College in 1936 and later graduated from the University of Maryland School of Law. He was admitted to the bar in Maryland in 1946.

== Career ==
Bratton served as a member of the U.S. Army's 29th Infantry Division during World War II. He reached the rank of lieutenant colonel.

Bratton was a Democrat. He was a member of the Maryland House of Delegates, representing Cecil County, from 1951 to 1954.

Bratton worked as a lawyer. He had an office on North Street in Elkton. He was a member of the Maryland State Bar Association and served as vice president from 1955 to 1956. He served as president of the Cecil County Bar Association from 1961 to 1963. He served as president of the Maryland 2nd Judicial Circuit from 1964 to 1965.

== Personal life ==
Bratton had two daughters and a son, Susan P., Kathleen W. and William W. Jr. He was an elder of the Elkton Presbyterian Church.

Bratton died on February 17, 1984, at his home in Elkton. He was buried at West Nottingham Presbyterian Cemetery.
