= Edgar U. Startt =

American politician (1919–2006)

Member of the Maryland House of Delegates from the Cecil County district
- In office 1971–1974 Serving with Richard D. Mackie
- Preceded by: Nancy Brown Burkheimer
- Succeeded by: district changed

Personal details
- Born: April 1, 1919 Locust Grove, Kent County, Maryland, U.S.
- Died: October 30, 2006 (aged 87) Elkton, Maryland, U.S.
- Resting place: Elkton Cemetery
- Party: Democratic
- Spouse: Mary Jane Lloyd (m. 1946; died 2001)
- Children: 1
- Occupation: Politician; sheriff
- Military career
- Branch: United States Army
- Conflicts: World War II; D-Day; European theatre
- Awards: Purple Heart

Edgar U. Startt (April 1, 1919 – October 30, 2006) was an American politician and sheriff from Maryland. He served as sheriff of Cecil County from 1958 to 1966. He served as a member of the Maryland House of Delegates, representing Cecil County from 1971 to 1974.

== Early life ==
Edgar U. Startt was born on April 1, 1919, in Locust Grove, Kent County, Maryland, to Mary A. (née Knight) and William H. Startt.

== Career ==
Startt served in the U.S. Army during World War II. He served at D-Day and in the European theatre. He served as platoon leader and received the Purple Heart. He served as commander of the 29th division association of the Disabled American Veterans. Startt worked as a police officer in Elkton.

Startt was a Democrat. Startt was elected as sheriff of Cecil County in 1958, defeating incumbent Nathan Kaplan. He served as sheriff until 1966, when he was defeated by Thomas Mogle Jr. by a margin of 10 votes. He then served as a trial magistrate in North East.

Startt served as a member of the Maryland House of Delegates, representing Cecil County, from 1971 to 1974. In 1973, Startt filed a lawsuit against the Cecil County sheriff Samuel F. du Pont for the appointment of special deputies to the police department without approval. In 1973, Startt introduced a law to disallow liquor sales at establishments if they weren't accompanied by food sales on Sundays. In 1974, Startt lost his bid for re-election and was appointed to the Cecil County jail board in September 1974. He resigned from the Cecil County jail board in November 1977.

In 1982, Startt ran for Cecil County sheriff against Jack DeWitt.

== Personal life ==
Startt married Mary Jane "Betty" Lloyd on September 4, 1946. They had one son, William E. His wife died in 2001. He went by the nickname Starkey.

Startt died on October 30, 2006, at Union Hospital in Elkton. He was buried at Elkton Cemetery.
