= Ralph W. McCool =

American politician (1918–2011)

Member of the Maryland House of Delegates from the Cecil County district
- In office March 30, 1957 – 1958 Serving with William F. Burkley and F. Reynolds Mackie
- Preceded by: Guy Johnson

Personal details
- Born: Ralph Wilson McCool; October 28, 1918 Elkton, Maryland, U.S.
- Died: July 21, 2011 (aged 92)
- Resting place: Bethel Cemetery
- Party: Democratic
- Spouse: Emma Grace McCabe (m. 1946)
- Children: 3
- Occupation: Politician; military pilot
- Military career
- Branch: United States Army Air Force
- Rank: Brevet colonel
- Unit: 445th Bombing Group
- Conflicts: World War II
- Awards: Distinguished Flying Cross

Ralph Wilson McCool (October 28, 1918 – July 21, 2011) was an American politician and military pilot from Maryland. He served as a member of the Maryland House of Delegates, representing Cecil County, from 1957 to 1958.

== Early life ==
Ralph Wilson McCool was born on October 28, 1918, in Elkton, Maryland, to Marion (née Smith) and George Washington McCool.

== Career ==
McCool served with the 445th Bombing Group during World War II. He flew the Consolidated B-24 Liberator. He flew over 35 missions over Germany. He received the Distinguished Flying Cross following his 25th mission. He was a member of the Maryland National Guard 29th Division Association and retired with the rank of brevet colonel.

McCool was a Democrat. He was appointed to replace Guy Johnson as a member of the Maryland House of Delegates, representing Cecil County. He served from March 30, 1957, to 1958. He served on the Ways and Means committee.

McCool worked at Maryland State Lottery.

== Personal life ==
McCool flew as a hobby after the war. In his 80s, McCool made tandem jumps from 14,000 feet, gaining him a reputation with the United States Parachute Association. One of his jumps was televised on the Outdoor Channel.

McCool married Emma Grace McCabe in 1946. They had three sons, Geoffrey Edward, Ralph Wilson II and Findlay McCabe. Later in life, McCool lived in Leeds.

McCool died on July 21, 2011. He was buried at Bethel Cemetery.
