= Frank H. Harris =

American politician (died 1987

Member of the Maryland House of Delegates from the Cecil County district
- In office 1959–1966 Serving with William F. Burkley, Richard D. Mackie, Nancy A. Brown, Guy Johnson, Nancy Brown Burkheimer, Douglas W. Connellee

Personal details
- Born: Cecil County, Maryland, U.S.
- Died: July 7, 1987 (aged 67) Havre de Grace, Maryland, U.S.
- Resting place: Asbury Cemetery; Port Deposit, Maryland, U.S.
- Party: Democratic
- Spouse(s): Helene Harwi (m. 1941; died 1973) Eleanor Baker
- Children: 3
- Occupation: Politician; engineer

Frank H. Harris (died July 7, 1987) was an American politician and railroad engineer from Maryland. He served as a member of the Maryland House of Delegates, representing Cecil County from 1959 to 1966.

== Early life ==
Frank H. Harris was born in Cecil County, Maryland.

== Career ==
In 1937, Harris started working for the Pennsylvania Railroad. He retired in 1982 as an engineer with Amtrak.

Harris was a Democrat. He was a member of the Democratic State Central Committee for four years. He was a member of the Maryland House of Delegates, representing Cecil County, from 1959 to 1966. In 1966, Harris ran for the Democratic nomination for Maryland Senate, but lost to both Richard D. Mackie and Nancy Brown Burkheimer. He was made chief clerk of the House of Delegates by Marvin Mandel, then speaker. He served in that role until Mandel became governor in 1969.

From 1969 to 1977, Harris worked as a legislative aide to Governor Marvin Mandel. He worked as one of the lobbyists on Mandel's team of lobbyists nicknamed "The Corporation". He was fired by acting Governor Blair Lee III in September 1977.

== Personal life ==
Harris married Helene Harwi of Blythedale on May 24, 1941. She died in 1973. They had one son and two daughters, Jonathan H., Kathleen and Molly H. He married Eleanor Baker. He had two step-daughters and one step-son, Patricia, Susan and Michael.

Harris died on July 7, 1987, aged 67, at Harford Memorial Hospital in Havre de Grace. He was buried at Asbury Cemetery in Port Deposit.
