= James Wilson Squier =

American politician and lawyer (died 1940)

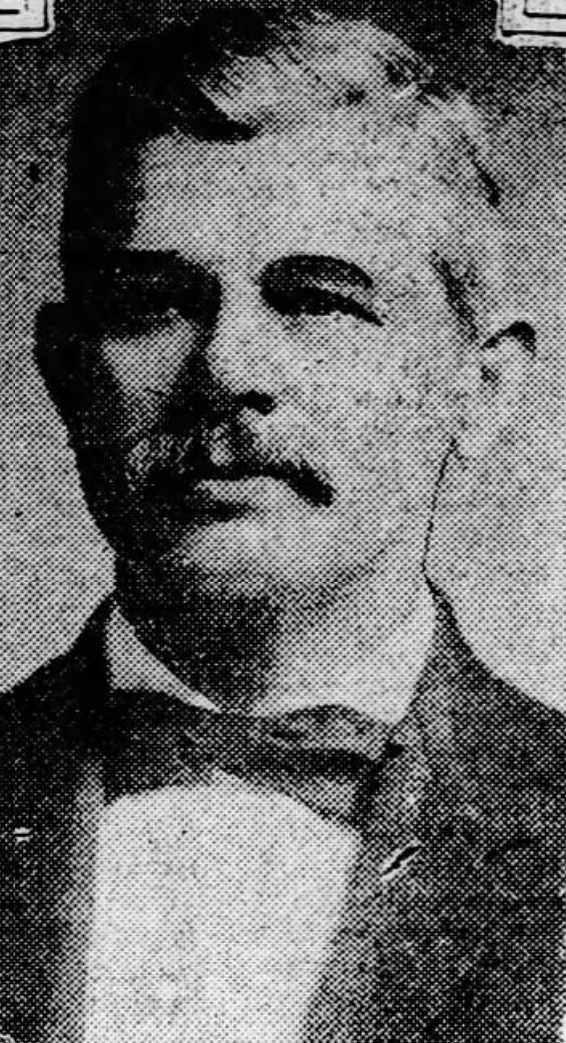
- Portrait of Squier in 1913 newspaper

Member of the Maryland House of Delegates from the Cecil County district
- In office 1908–1910 Serving with James C. McCauley and Clinton J. Yerkes

Personal details
- Born: Port Deposit, Maryland, U.S.
- Died: October 16, 1940 (aged 86) near Port Deposit, Maryland, U.S.
- Resting place: West Nottingham Cemetery
- Party: Democratic
- Spouse: Helen Rowland
- Relatives: Cecil Clyde Squier (brother)
- Occupation: Politician; lawyer

James Wilson Squier (died October 16, 1940) was an American politician and lawyer from Maryland. He served as a member of the Maryland House of Delegates from 1908 to 1910.

== Early life ==
James Wilson Squier was born in Port Deposit, Maryland, to John Squier. His father was a reverend and superintendent of education in Cecil County. Squier was educated at West Nottingham Academy and studied law under judge Frederick Stump. His brother was state senator Cecil Clyde Squier.

== Career ==
Squier was a state's attorney of Cecil County in 1903.

Squier was a Democrat. He was a member of the Maryland House of Delegates, representing Cecil County from 1908 to 1910. In 1913, Squier ran for the Democratic nomination for the Maryland Senate, but lost to Byron Bouchelle.

== Personal life ==
Squier married Helen Rowland.

Squier died on October 16, 1940, at the age of 86, at his home near Port Deposit. He was buried at West Nottingham Cemetery.
