= Josephine Mackie Corcoran =

American politician (1894–1967)

Member of the Maryland House of Delegates from the Cecil County district
- In office October 7, 1941 – 1946 Serving with Polk S. Howard, Frank L. Rowland, Joseph B. Bryson, Lawson C. Tosh
- Preceded by: Luther P. Jefferson

Personal details
- Born: Josephine Aiken; March 8, 1894
- Died: December 29, 1967 (aged 73) Elkton, Maryland, U.S.
- Resting place: Sharps Cemetery; Fair Hill, Maryland, U.S.
- Party: Democratic
- Spouse(s): Osborne S. Mackie (died 1939) John T. Corcoran (m. 1946)
- Children: 10, including Richard D.
- Occupation: Politician; educator; farmer

Josephine Mackie Corcoran (née Aiken; March 8, 1894 – December 29, 1967) was an American politician from Maryland. She served as a member of the Maryland House of Delegates, representing Cecil County from 1941 to 1946. She was the first woman in Cecil County to hold public office.

== Early life ==
Josephine Aiken was born on March 8, 1894.

== Career ==
She worked as a school teacher in Cecil County Public Schools for three years.

She was a Democrat. She served as a member of the Democratic State Central Committee for six years. She was appointed as a member of the Maryland House of Delegates, representing Cecil County on October 7, 1941, following the death of Luther P. Jefferson. With the appointment, she was the first woman in Cecil County to hold public office. She was later elected on November 3, 1942. She served in that position until 1946.

She worked as a farmer and housewife. She was president of the National Order of Women Legislators.

== Personal life ==
She married Osborne S. Mackie. He died in 1939. She married John T. Corcoran in 1946. She had five daughters and five sons, Jean, Eleanor, Catharine, Pauline, Wilhelmina, Richard D., F. Thomas, Joseph T., Davis L. and Osborne S. Jr. Her son Richard would also serve in the Maryland House of Delegates.

She lived in Elkton and later in Warwick. She later lived on Little Elk Creek Road in Fair Hill. She died on December 29, 1967, at Union Hospital in Elkton. She was buried at Sharps Cemetery in Fair Hill.
