= Thomas Mackie =

Thomas Mackie may refer to:

- Thomas Mackie (politician) (1840–1905), lumber merchant and political figure in Ontario, Canada
- Thomas J. Mackie (1888–1955), Scottish bacteriologist
- Thomas Rockwell Mackie, medical physicist
- Thomas T. Mackie, research/public health physician in the United States Army during World War II
