= F. Reynolds Mackie =

American politician (died 1972)

Member of the Maryland House of Delegates from the Cecil County district
- In office 1953–1958 Serving with William Wilson Bratton, Guy Johnson, William F. Burkley, Ralph W. McCool
- Preceded by: George Benson

Personal details
- Born: Fair Hill, Maryland, U.S.
- Died: December 19, 1972 (aged 65) Elkton, Maryland, U.S.
- Resting place: Rose Bank Cemetery; Calvert, Maryland, U.S.
- Party: Democratic
- Spouse: Alberta M. Littleton (m. 1941)
- Children: 3
- Education: University of Delaware
- Occupation: Politician; businessman

F. Reynolds Mackie (died December 19, 1972) was an American politician and businessman from Maryland. He served as a member of the Maryland House of Delegates, representing Cecil County, from 1953 to 1958.

== Early life ==
F. Reynolds Mackie was born in Fair Hall, Cecil County, Maryland. He graduated from Calvert High School and attended the University of Delaware.

== Career ==
Mackie owned and operated Mackie's Home and Farm Center, Inc., in Cecilton for about 40 years, from the 1930s to his death. In 1941, he was vice president of the George W. Biles Company.

Mackie was a Democrat. He was a member of the Democratic State Central Committee from 1947 to 1953. In 1953, Mackie was appointed by Governor Theodore McKeldin to replace George Benson as a member of the Maryland House of Delegates, representing Cecil County. He served in that role until 1958.

Mackie was a director of the Elkton Banking and Trust Company and a member of the Cecil County Tax Appeal Court.

== Personal life ==
Mackie married Alberta M. Littleton of Snow Hill, daughter of George W. Littleton, on May 24, 1941. They had one son and two daughters, G. Eugene, Ann and Elaine. In 1953, Mackie lived in Thistleton.

Mackie died on December 19, 1972, at the age of 65, at Union Hospital in Elkton. He was buried at Rose Bank Cemetery in Calvert.
