= Cecil Clyde Squier =

American politician (died 1951)

Member of the Maryland Senate from the Cecil County district
- In office 1939–1943
- Preceded by: Harold E. Cobourn
- Succeeded by: James W. Hughes
- In office 1927–1931
- Preceded by: Harry A. Cantwell
- Succeeded by: Wallace Williams

Member of the Maryland House of Delegates from the Cecil County district
- In office 1920–1924 Serving with S. Ralph Andrews, Frank T. Benson, Perry A. Gibson, Albert D. Mackey

Personal details
- Died: March 20, 1951 (aged 80) Port Deposit, Maryland, U.S.
- Resting place: West Nottingham Cemetery
- Party: Democratic
- Relatives: James Wilson Squier (brother)
- Occupation: Politician

Cecil Clyde Squier (died March 20, 1951) was an American politician from Maryland who served as a member of the Maryland House of Delegates, representing Cecil County from 1920 to 1924 and as a member of the Maryland Senate from 1927 to 1931 and from 1939 to 1943.

== Biography ==
Cecil Clyde Squier was born to Isabella (née Wilson) and John Squier. His father was a reverend. His brother was James Wilson Squier, a state politician and lawyer.

Squier was a Democrat. He served as a member of the Maryland House of Delegates, representing Cecil County from 1920 to 1924. Squier served as a member of the Maryland Senate, representing Cecil County from 1927 to 1931 and from 1939 to 1943.

Squier did not marry and lived in Port Deposit, Maryland. He died on March 20, 1951, at the age of 80, in Port Deposit. He was buried at West Nottingham Cemetery.
