= Niles Scott =

American football player (born 1995)

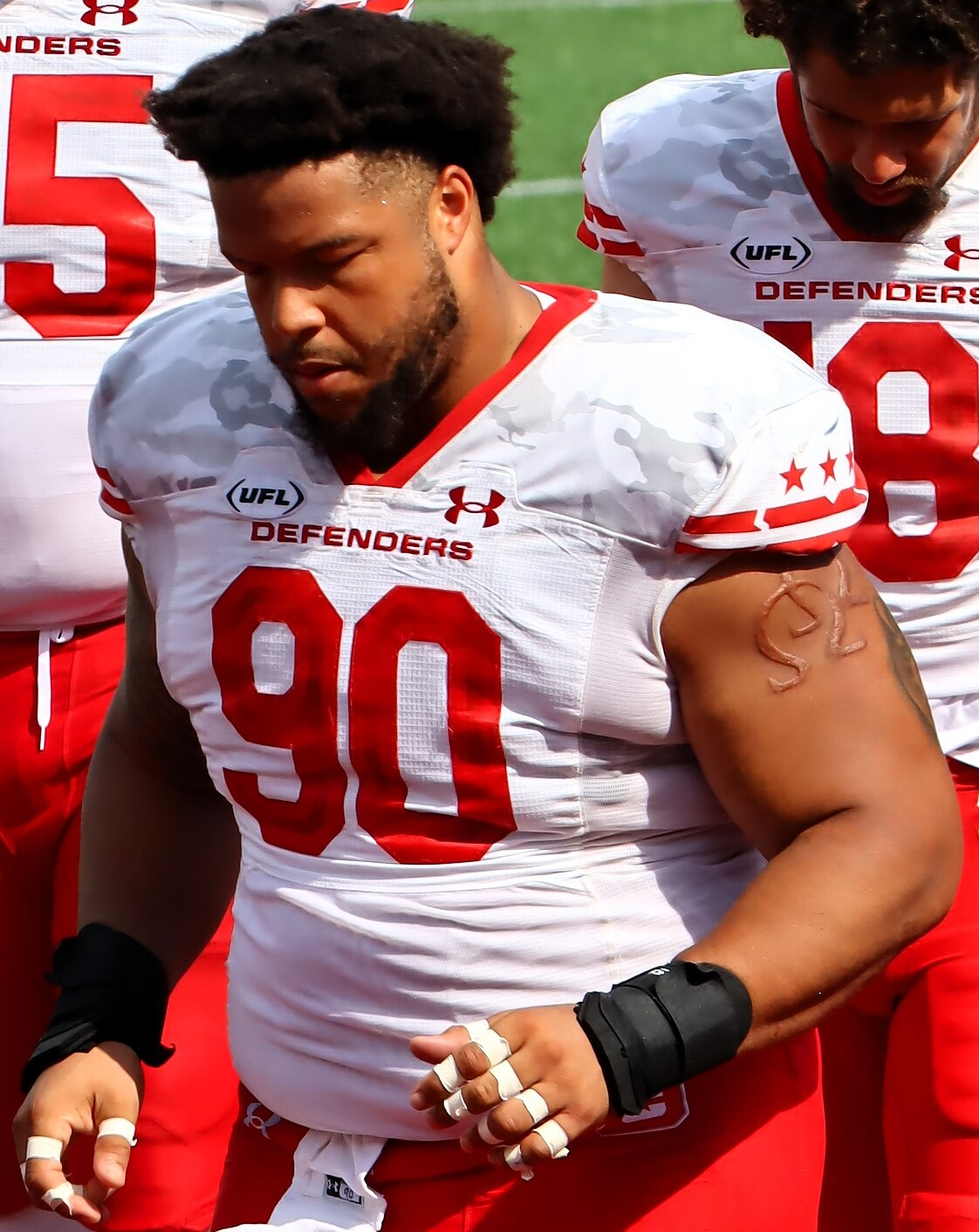
- Scott in 2025

Profile
- Position: Nose tackle

Personal information
- Born: September 30, 1995 (age 31); Elkton, Maryland, U.S.
- Listed height: 6 ft 2 in (1.88 m)
- Listed weight: 320 lb (145 kg)

Career information
- High school: Elkton
- College: Frostburg State (2014–2017)
- NFL draft: 2018: undrafted

Career history
- San Francisco 49ers (2018)*; Denver Broncos (2018)*; Cincinnati Bengals (2018–2019); Buffalo Bills (2020)*; Las Vegas Raiders (2020–2021)*; Tennessee Titans (2021)*; New England Patriots (2021)*; Seattle Seahawks (2021)*; Miami Dolphins (2022)*; DC Defenders (2023–2025)
- * Offseason or practice squad member only

Awards and highlights
- UFL champion (2025); First-team All-NJAC (2017); Second-team All-NJAC (2016)

Career NFL statistics
- Total tackles: 4
- Stats at Pro Football Reference

Niles Scott (born September 30, 1995) is an American football nose tackle. He played college football at Frostburg State.

== College career ==
Scott played four seasons for Division III Frostburg State, where he recorded 150 tackles, 43 of them for loss, and 25 sacks. During his senior season, Scott recorded 16.5 tackles for a loss, 10 sacks and 51 total tackles and was named First-team AP Little All-America, the D3football.com All-America Second-team and the D3football.com All-East Region Defensive Player of the Year. Additionally, Scott was one of only three Division III players to be named to the 2018 SPIRAL Tropical Bowl.

== Professional career ==
Pre-draft measurables
Height	Weight	Arm length	Hand span	40-yard dash	10-yard split	20-yard split	20-yard shuttle	Three-cone drill	Vertical jump	Broad jump	Bench press
6 ft 1 1/8 in (1.86 m)	326 lb (148 kg)	32 1/8 in (0.82 m)	10 in (0.25 m)	5.21 s	1.80 s	3.03 s	4.85 s	7.75 s	30.5 in (0.77 m)	8 ft 5 in (2.57 m)	29 reps
All values from Pro Day

=== San Francisco 49ers ===
Scott signed with the San Francisco 49ers as an undrafted free agent on April 28, 2018. He was released on September 1, 2018, after failing to make the final 53-man roster at the end of training camp. He was signed to the 49ers' practice squad but was released by the team on September 6, 2018.

=== Denver Broncos ===
Scott was signed to the Denver Broncos practice squad on September 11, 2018. He was released by the team but subsequently re-signed to the practice squad on October 9, 2018.

=== Cincinnati Bengals ===
Scott was signed to the Cincinnati Bengals active roster off the Broncos practice squad on November 22, 2018. Scott made his NFL debut on November 25, 2018, against the Cleveland Browns, making two tackles in the Bengals 35–20 loss. In his rookie season Scott played in six games, making four tackles.

On August 8, 2019, Scott was placed on injured reserve with a foot injury.

=== Buffalo Bills ===
On August 2, 2020, Scott was signed by the Buffalo Bills. He was waived/injured on August 16, 2020, and subsequently reverted to the team's injured reserve list the next day. He was waived from injured reserve with an injury settlement on August 25, 2020.

=== Las Vegas Raiders ===
On December 14, 2020, Scott signed with the practice squad of the Las Vegas Raiders. He signed a reserve/future contract on January 5, 2021.

On August 31, 2021, Scott was waived by the Raiders and re-signed to the practice squad the next day. He was released on September 6.

=== Tennessee Titans ===
On November 2, 2021, Scott was signed to the Tennessee Titans practice squad. He was released on November 23.

=== New England Patriots ===
On November 26, 2021, Scott was signed to the New England Patriots practice squad, but was released four days later.

=== Seattle Seahawks ===
On December 8, 2021, Scott was signed to the Seattle Seahawks practice squad. He signed a reserve/future contract with the Seahawks on January 10, 2022. He was released on May 3, 2022.

=== Miami Dolphins ===
On August 15, 2022, Scott signed with the Miami Dolphins. He was waived on August 29 and re-signed to the practice squad. He was released off the practice squad on September 5, 2022.

=== DC Defenders ===
On November 17, 2022, Scott was drafted by the DC Defenders of the XFL. He was activated from the team's reserve list on May 16, 2023. He re-signed with the team on January 23, 2024, and again on October 3, 2024. He was released on February 14, 2025. He re-signed with the team in March 2025.
