= Freddie Swain =

American football player (born 1998)

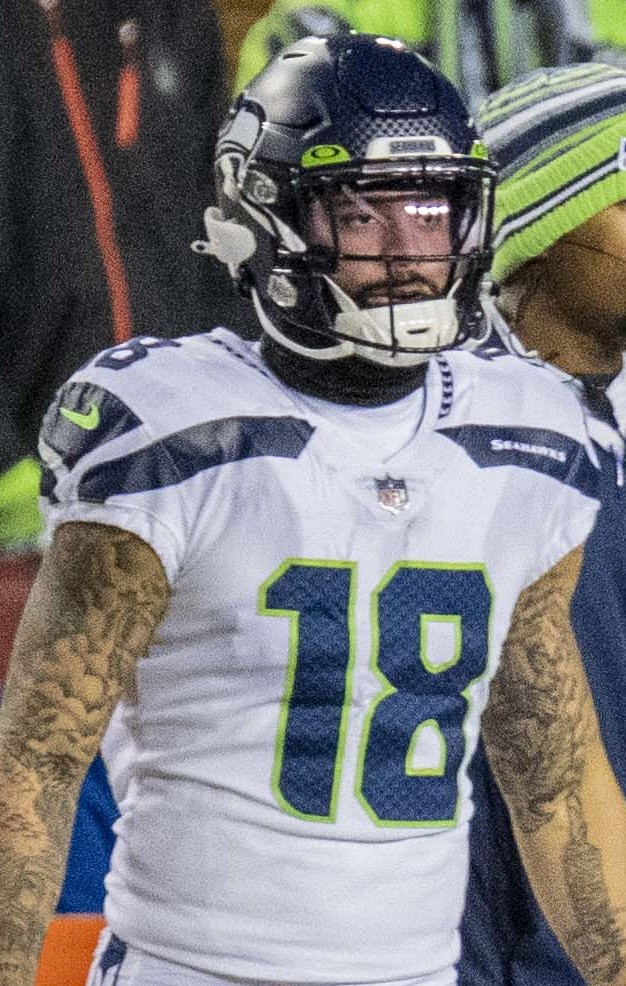
- Swain with the Seattle Seahawks in 2021

No. 18, 83, 86
- Position: Wide receiver

Personal information
- Born: August 4, 1998 (age 28); Ocala, Florida, U.S.
- Listed height: 6 ft 0 in (1.83 m)
- Listed weight: 199 lb (90 kg)

Career information
- High school: North Marion (Citra, Florida)
- College: Florida (2016–2019)
- NFL draft: 2020: 6th round, 214th overall pick

Career history
- Seattle Seahawks (2020–2021); Miami Dolphins (2022)*; Denver Broncos (2022); Miami Dolphins (2023)*; Philadelphia Eagles (2023)*; Miami Dolphins (2023)*; Chicago Bears (2024)*; Saskatchewan Roughriders (2026)*
- * Offseason or practice squad member only

Career NFL statistics
- Receptions: 42
- Receiving yards: 576
- Receiving touchdowns: 6
- Return yards: 326
- Stats at Pro Football Reference

Freddie Swain (born August 4, 1998) is an American former professional football player who was a wide receiver in the National Football League (NFL). He played college football for the Florida Gators.

== Early life ==
Swain attended North Marion High School, where he was a consensus four-star recruit and fielded scholarship offers from Alabama and Clemson before selecting Florida. As a return specialist, Swain returned 22 punts for 224 yards in 2018, including an 85-yard return for a touchdown. In 2019, he compiled 14 returns for 56 yards. Swain tallied 38 catches for 527 yards and a team-high seven touchdowns as a senior. In 47 career games, including 10 starts, Swain gained 1,387 all-purpose yards. He had 69 career receptions for 996 yards and 15 touchdowns.

== College career ==
Swain totaled 68 receptions for 996 receiving yards and 15 receiving touchdowns in four seasons with the Florida Gators.

== Professional career ==
Pre-draft measurables
Height	Weight	Arm length	Hand span	40-yard dash	10-yard split	20-yard split	20-yard shuttle	Three-cone drill	Vertical jump	Broad jump	Bench press
6 ft 0 1/4 in (1.84 m)	197 lb (89 kg)	30 5/8 in (0.78 m)	9 in (0.23 m)	4.46 s	1.57 s	2.60 s	4.26 s	7.05 s	36.5 in (0.93 m)	10 ft 4 in (3.15 m)	16 reps
All values from NFL Combine

=== Seattle Seahawks ===
Swain was selected by the Seattle Seahawks in the sixth round with the 214th overall pick in the 2020 NFL draft.

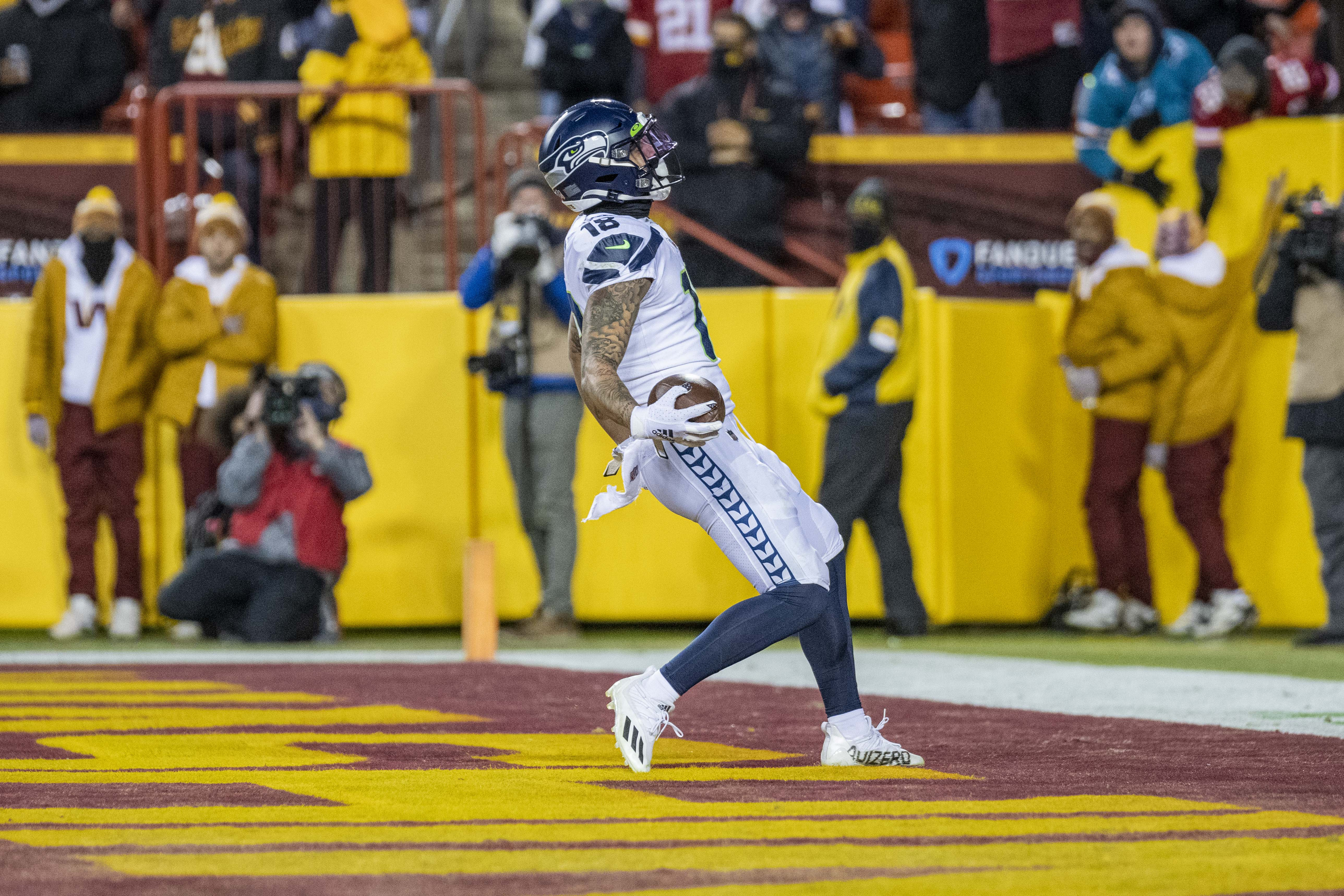
Swain scores a touchdown against the Washington Football Team in 2021.

Swain made his NFL debut in Week 1 against the Atlanta Falcons. During the game, Swain recovered a fumble lost by punt returner Sharrod Neasman in the 38–25 win. He caught his first pass for 17 yards in that game. In Swain's second game at home against the New England Patriots on Sunday Night Football, he caught his first touchdown for 21 yards thrown by Russell Wilson. In Week 14, in a home game against the New York Jets, Swain caught a 19 yard touchdown pass thrown by Wilson. On August 30, 2022, Swain was released by the Seahawks.

=== Miami Dolphins (first stint) ===
On September 2, 2022, Swain was signed to the practice squad of the Miami Dolphins. On December 10, 2022, Swain was elevated to the active roster.

=== Denver Broncos ===
On December 13, 2022, Swain was signed by the Denver Broncos to their active roster. He was waived on March 14, 2023.

=== Miami Dolphins (second stint) ===
On March 15, 2023, the Dolphins claimed Swain off waivers. He was waived on August 13, 2023.

=== Philadelphia Eagles ===
On August 23, 2023, Swain was signed by the Philadelphia Eagles. He was waived on August 29.

=== Miami Dolphins (third stint) ===
On October 3, 2023, Swain was signed to the Dolphins practice squad. He was not signed to a reserve/future contract after the season and thus became a free agent upon the expiration of his practice squad contract.

=== Chicago Bears ===
On May 13, 2024, Swain signed with the Chicago Bears. He was placed on injured reserve on August 21.

=== Saskatchewan Roughriders ===
On February 10, 2026, Swain signed with the Saskatchewan Roughriders in the Canadian Football League. He was added to the retired list on May 10.
