= William F. Burkley =

American politician (died 2001)

Member of the Maryland House of Delegates from the Cecil County district
- In office 1955–1962 Serving with Guy Johnson, F. Reynolds Mackie, Ralph W. McCool, Frank H. Harris
- Preceded by: William Wilson Bratton

Personal details
- Born: William Feehly Burkley
- Died: October 12, 2001 (aged 71) Elkton, Maryland, U.S.
- Party: Democratic
- Spouse: Judy Elm Keller (m. 1955)
- Education: University of Richmond; University of Maryland School of Law
- Occupation: Politician; real estate businessman

William Feehly Burkley (died October 12, 2001) was an American politician from Maryland. He served as a member of the Maryland House of Delegates, representing Cecil County, from 1955 to 1962.

== Early life ==
William Feehly Burkley was born to John K. Burkley. He grew up in Elkton, Maryland. Burkley attended public schools in Cecil County and graduated from Elkton High School in 1947. He attended the University of Richmond for two years. He then studied at the University of Maryland School of Law for two years. Burkley was a member of Kappa Sigma at the University of Richmond and Delta Theta Pi at the University of Maryland School of Law.

== Career ==
After his father died, Burkley took over his father's real estate and insurance business.

Burkley was a Democrat. He served in the Maryland House of Delegates, representing Cecil County, from 1955 to 1962. He served on the Judiciary and House Ways and Means committees. While in the legislature, he monitored the end of the United States Naval Training Center Bainbridge and environmental issues concerning the new Peach Bottom Nuclear Generating Station. In 1958, Burkley co-sponsored a bill to ensure equal access to public facilities in Maryland. He ran for Maryland Senate in 1962, but lost.

After leaving the House of Delegates, Burkley served as chairman of the Maryland Transportation Commission. He advised governors Marvin Mandel and Harry Hughes over the course of 13 years. In the 1980s, Governor William Donald Schaefer appointed Burkley to the Maryland Economic Development and Community Development Commission. He helped develop the Upper Chesapeake Corporate Center and worked to attract employers to Cecil County, including the office equipment manufacturer Konica and W. L. Gore & Associates. Burkley was a member of the Elkton Alliance Commission to revitalize downtown Elkton. He was a member of Cecil County's Trial Courts Judicial Nominating Commission during Governor Parris Glendening's term. He was president of the Maryland Insurance Agents Association, served as the first president of the Cecil County Board of Realtors, and served on the board of Union Hospital. He was a lifelong member of NAACP.

== Personal life ==
Burkley married Judy Elm Keller of Baltimore, daughter of Arthur D. Keller, on April 23, 1955. He died of heart failure on October 12, 2001, at the age of 71, at his home in Elkton.
